= Epanochori, Chania =

Human settlement in Greece

Epanochori Επανωχώρι
- Community
- Location within Greece
- Coordinates: 35°19′30″N 23°49′37″E
- Country: Greece
- Administrative region: Crete
- Regional unit: Chania
- Municipality: Kantanos-Selino
- Municipal unit: East Selino

Population (2021)
  - Community: 191
- Time zone: UTC+2 (EET)
  - Summer (DST): UTC+3 (EEST)

Epanochori (Greek: Επανωχώρι) is a community and a small village in Chania regional unit on the island of Crete, Greece. It is part of the municipal unit of East Selino (Anatoliko Selino). The community consists of the following villages (population in 2021):

- Epanochori, pop. 46
- Agia Eirini, pop. 58
- Prines, pop. 68
- Seliniotikos Gyros, pop. 14
- Tsiskiana, pop. 5

Agia Eirini is the starting point of the Agia Eirini Gorge. In Tsiskiana is located the Byzantine church of Agios Eftychis, who is the patron saint of the whole Selino region.
