= Agia Eirini =

Agia Eirini (Greek: Άγια Ειρήνη, for Saint Irene) may refer to several places in Cyprus and Greece:

== In Cyprus ==
- Agia Eirini, Kyrenia
- Agia Eirini, Nicosia

== In Greece ==
- Agia Eirini Gorge, in Chania, Crete
- Agia Eirini, Chania, a village in Chania, Crete
- Agia Eirini, Cephalonia, on the island of Cephalonia
- Agia Eirini, Paros, on the island of Paros
- Agia Eirini, Kea, a prehistoric settlement on Kea Island
- Agia Eirini (island), an uninhabited islet south of Crete

== See also ==
- Hagia Irene, an ancient Byzantine church in Istanbul
