= East Selino =

East Selino Ανατολικό Σέλινο
- Municipal unit
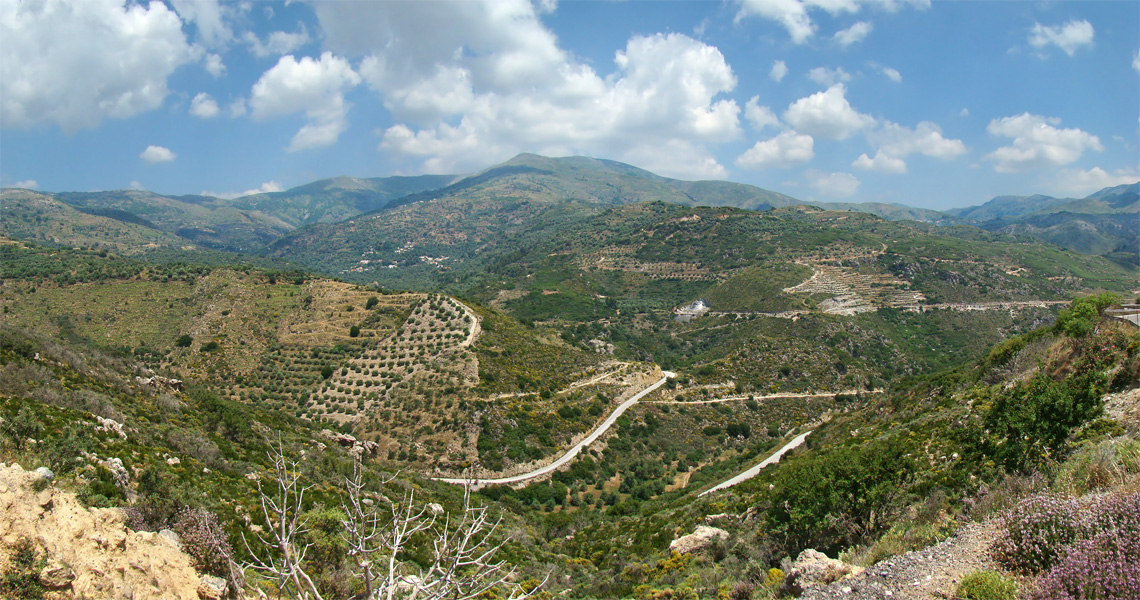
- Landscape around Moni

- Location within the regional unit

- Location within Greece
- Coordinates: 35°16′N 23°51′E
- Country: Greece
- Administrative region: Crete
- Regional unit: Chania
- Municipality: Kantanos-Selino

Area
  - Municipal unit: 136.6 km^{2} (52.7 sq mi)

Population (2021)
  - Municipal unit: 760
  - Municipal unit density: 5.6/km^{2} (14/sq mi)
- Time zone: UTC+2 (EET)
  - Summer (DST): UTC+3 (EEST)
- Postal code: 730 09
- Area code: 28230
- Vehicle registration: ΧΝ, XB
- Website: Anatoliko Selino

East Selino (Greek: Ανατολικό Σέλινο - Anatoliko Selino) is a former municipality in the Chania regional unit, Crete, Greece. Since the 2011 local government reform it is part of the municipality Kantanos-Selino, of which it is a municipal unit. The municipal unit has an area of 136.555 km^{2} (52.724 sq mi). It is situated on the south-west coast of the island of Crete. It was part of the former Selino Province which covered the mountain and coastal region west of Sfakia. The seat of the municipality was Kampanos.

The municipal unit is subdivided into the following communities (constituent villages in brackets):

- Epanochori (Epanochori, Agia Eirini, Prines, Seliniotikos Gyros, Tsiskiana)
- Kampanos (Kampanos, Maralia)
- Rodovani (Rodovani, Agriles, Kamaria, Livada, Maza)
- Skafi (Skafi, Argastiri, Pera Skafi)
- Sougia (Sougia, Koustogerako, Livadas, Moni)
- Temenia (Temenia, Pappadiana, Stratoi)

Within Anatoliko Selino lies the Agia Eirini Gorge, the ruins of the ancient cities of Elyros, Lissos, Yrtakina and Syia and many Byzantine churches. The area's main product is olive oil. Sougia is a growing beach resort with a few small hotels and tavernas.

== See also ==
- List of communities of Chania
