= List of extreme points of Greece =

This is a list of the extreme points of Greece, the points that are farther north, south, east or west than any other location.

Latitude and longitude extremities of Greece

== Mainland ==
- Northernmost point — Trigono/Ormenio Border Crossing, Evros regional unit (41°44′51.5″N 26°09′58.6″E)
- Northernmost settlement — Ormenio, Evros regional unit (41°43′13″N 26°12′48″E)
- Southernmost point — Cape Tenaro, also Cape Matapan, the Peloponnese (37°23′08″N 22°28′59″E)
- Southernmost settlement — Kokkinogia, the Peloponnese (36°24′14″N 22°29′12″E)
- Westernmost point — Ftelia Bay (Ormos Ftelias), Thesprotia (39°41′25″N 20°00′41″E)
- Westernmost settlement — Skala Sagiadas, Thesprotia (39°37′38″N 20°11′06″E)
- Easternmost point — unnamed river island, Evros River, Evros regional unit (41°23′04″N 26°38′07″E)
- Easternmost settlement — Stathmos Pythiou, Evros regional unit (41°22′17″N 26°37′17″E)

== Entire Greece ==
- Northernmost point — Gravia area, Evros regional unit (41°44′56″N 26°13′48″E)
- Northernmost settlement — Ormenio, Evros regional unit (41°43′13″N 26°12′48″E)
- Southernmost point — Cape Trypiti (34°48′03″N 24°07′20″E). It is also the southernmost point of Europe.
- Southernmost settlement — Vatsiana (34°49′14″N 24°05′55″E)
- Westernmost point — Xilosermi beach, Othonoi, off Corfu (39°51′07″N 19°22′26″E)
- Westernmost settlement — Chorio, Othonoi, off Corfu (39°51′12″N 19°22′56″E)
- Easternmost point — islet of Strongyli, in the Megisti archipelago (36°06′58″N 29°38′43″E)
- Easternmost settlement — Kastellorizo, in the Megisti archipelago (36°08′54″N 29°35′30″E)
- Highest point — the peak of Mount Olympus, 2917 m
- Lowest point — sea level
- Deepest point — Calypso Deep, Ionian Sea, -5267 m. It is also the deepest point of the Mediterranean Sea.

== Historical ==
Upon liberation of Greece in 1830, the extreme points of the country were:

- North: Psathoura island (39.498°N 24.181°E) in the Northern Sporades, NE of Alonnisos
- South: Eschati (Mermengas) islet in the Cyclades, around 10 miles SW of Santorini
- East: Amorgos island (36°50′N 25°54′E) and in particular the eastern tip thereof, east of Aegiali village
- West: Forti islet in the Ionian Sea, in the narrow straits between the island of Lefkas (still under British rule) and the coast of Acarnania province of the Aetolia-Acarnania prefecture, to which it belonged

Upon granting of the Ionian Islands to Greece in 1864 the extreme points of the country were modified as follows:

- North & West: Sazan Island (Sason, Saso) (40°30′N 19°17′E) at the entrance of the Bay of Vlorë (Aulon, Avlona)
- South: Antikythera (35°52′N 23°18′E)

== See also ==
- Extreme points of Earth
- Geography of Greece
