= Ioannis Pagomenos =

Greek painter

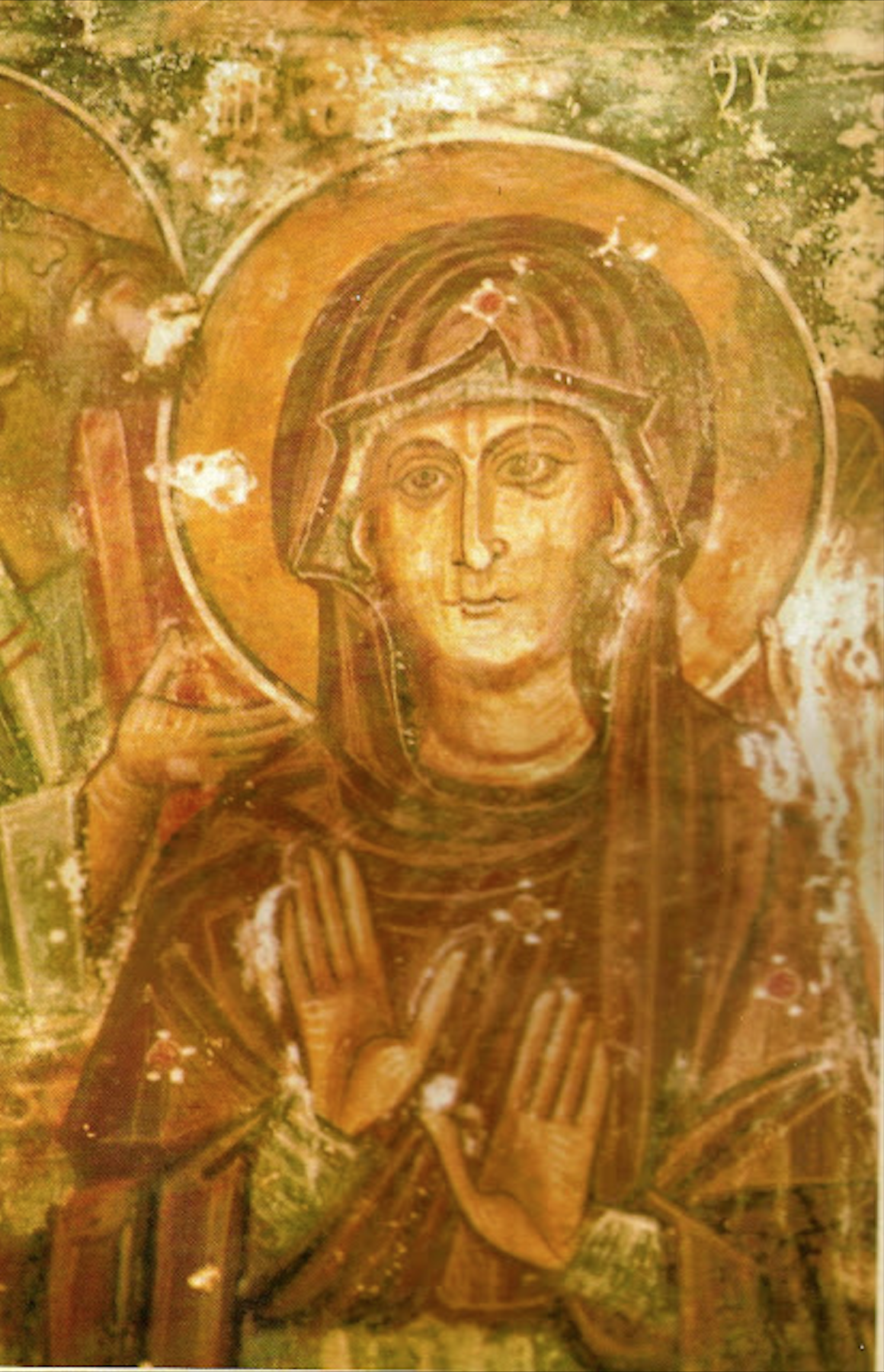
- Virgin Mary by Ioannis Pagomenos
- Born: c.1285 Candia, Crete (?)
- Died: after 1340; Crete (?)
- Style: Byzantine

Ioannis Pagomenos (Greek: Ιωάννης Παγωμένος, c.1285–after 1340) was a Greek painter in the Byzantine style active in Venetian-ruled Crete. He created fresco cycles for rural Orthodox churches under commission from ordinary members of the local peasant communities, who acted as collective patrons. While he could be considered a forerunner to the Cretan School, which saw success in producing hybrid-style icons for an international clientele, his work was more traditional in character and only incorporated Western influences in secondary details, as it catered to regional tastes. His style nonetheless shows significant development over the years. His frescos survive in four districts of the Chania prefecture, with the majority in the mountainous province of Selino, which displays the highest density of church painting in Crete. By 1337/8 Pagomenos was working together with his son Nikolaos within the framework of a small family workshop of painters, other examples of which are known from contemporary Crete and the Aegean.

== Life ==
Pagomenos was most likely born in Candia where his surname is well attested, in contrast to Selino. He is also supposed to have trained there as an artist, due to the weakness of Chania as an urban centre at the time. The early fourteenth-century Cretan painters Theodoros Daniil and his nephew Michail Veneris, also active in western Crete, might have exerted a formative influence on Pagomenos before he developed his own distinctive style. His contemporaries elsewhere in the Byzantine Empire included Manuel Panselinos, Michael Astrapas and Eutychios from Macedonia. The only record of Pagomenos' life is in the churches he signed. His career in western Crete spanned nearly three decades from 1313/4 to 1340, and his workshop continued to operate into the 1360s under the new stylistic direction of his son Nikolaos.

== Known work ==
The painter's own name has been deciphered in nine dedicatory inscriptions to date, with a tenth mention being traced to Pagomenos through family context:

- St George (Agios Georgios) in Komitades, Sfakia 1313/4 (signed by Pagomenos)
- St Nicholas (Agios Nikolaos) at Moni, Selino 1315 (signed by Pagomenos)
- Dormition (Koimesis) of the Theotokos in Alikampos, Apokoronas 1315/6 (signed by Pagomenos)
- St Demetrius (Agios Dimitrios) at Vrysali in Leivada, Selino 1315/6 (signed by the monk Nifon and by Pagomenos as a second painter)
- St George (Agios Georgios) in Anydroi, Selino 1323 (signed by Pagomenos)
- St Nicholas (Agios Nikolaos) in Maza, Apokoronas 1325/6 (signed by Pagomenos)
- Virgin Mary (Panagia Evangelistria) at Beilitika in Kakodiki, Selino 1332 (signed by Pagomenos)
- Archangel Michael (Archangelos Michail) in Kouneni (now Vathi), Kissamos 1336/7 (signed by Pagomenos and his son Nikolaos)
- St George (Agios Georgios) at Tsarkos/Kakos Potamos in Prodromi, Selino 1337/8 (signed by Ioannis Pagomenos and Nikolaos)
- St John the Theologian (Agios Ioannis o Theologos) in Kalamos, Selino 1340 (signed by a Ioannis and a Nikolaos, i.e. the Pagomenoi)

In addition, the workshop of Pagomenos has been credited with the below dateable church paintings:

- Archangel Michael (Archangelos Michail) at Kavalariana in Kandanos, Selino 1327/8 (signed by a Ioannis; attribution rejected on stylistic and palaeographic grounds by Lymberopoulou but upheld by Tsamakda also on stylistic grounds)
- St John the Theologian (Agios Ioannis o Theologos) at Trachiniakos in Kandanos, Selino 1329 (unsigned, attributed on stylistic grounds to the workshop of Pagomenos)
- Apostles Peter and Paul (Agioi Apostoloi Petros kai Pavlos) in Kopetoi, Selino 1334/5 (attributed by Maderakis)
- Virgin Mary (Panagia) in Kadros, Selino 1338/9
- St Pantaleon (Agios Panteleimon) in Prodromi, Selino (attributed)
- Virgin Mary (Panagia) at Skafidia in Prodromi, Selino 1347 (signed by a Ioakeim, whom Kalokyris supposes to be Pagomenos under a monastic name, and whom Ioannidou sees as a younger painter in the workshop of Pagomenos, possibly another of his sons)
- St Anna (Agia Anna) at Anisaraki in Kandanos, Selino 1352 (signed by a Nikolaos and another painter)
- St Paraskevi (Agia Paraskevi) at Trachiniakos in Kandanos, Selino 1362 (?)

== Gallery ==
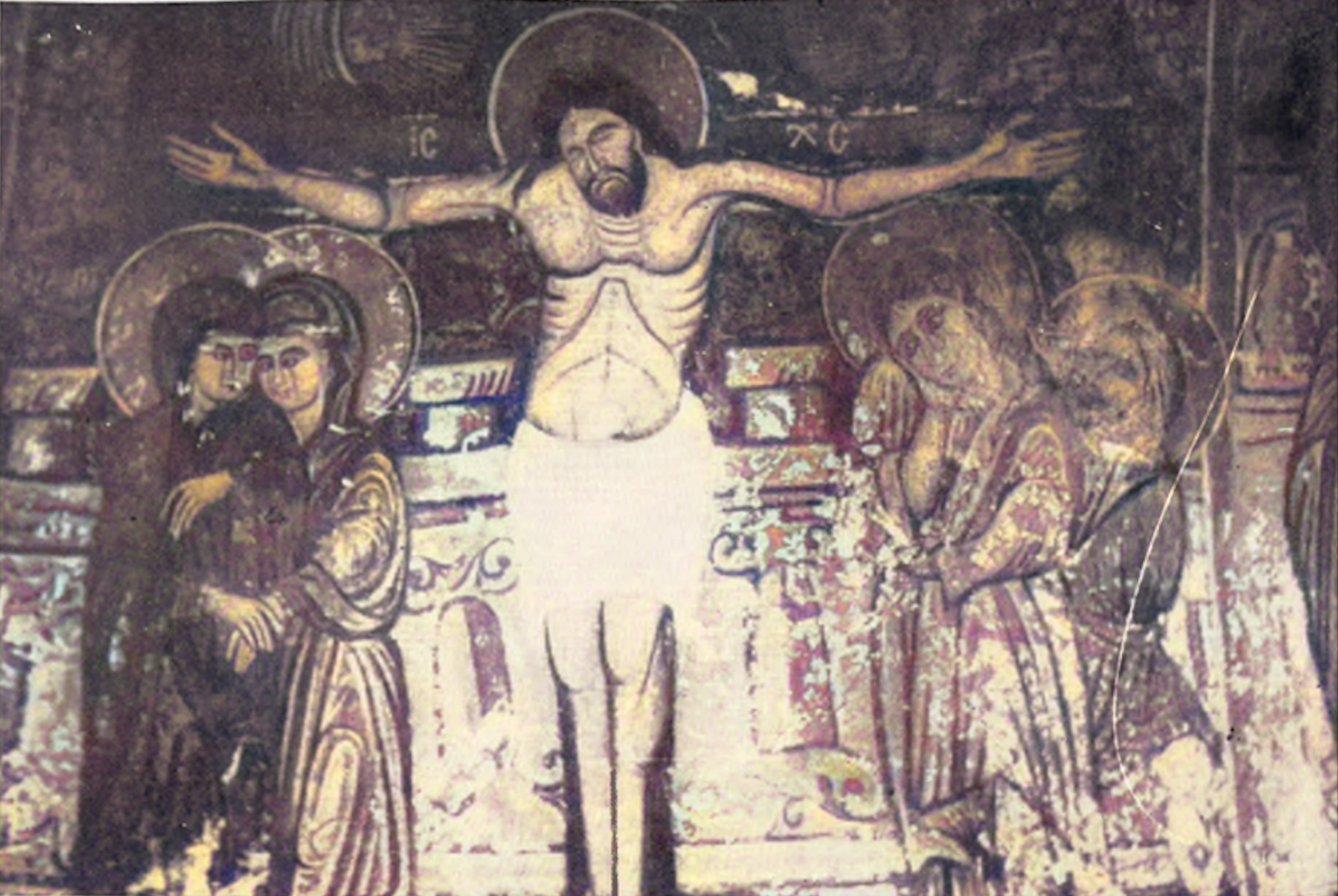
Crucifixion of Jesus

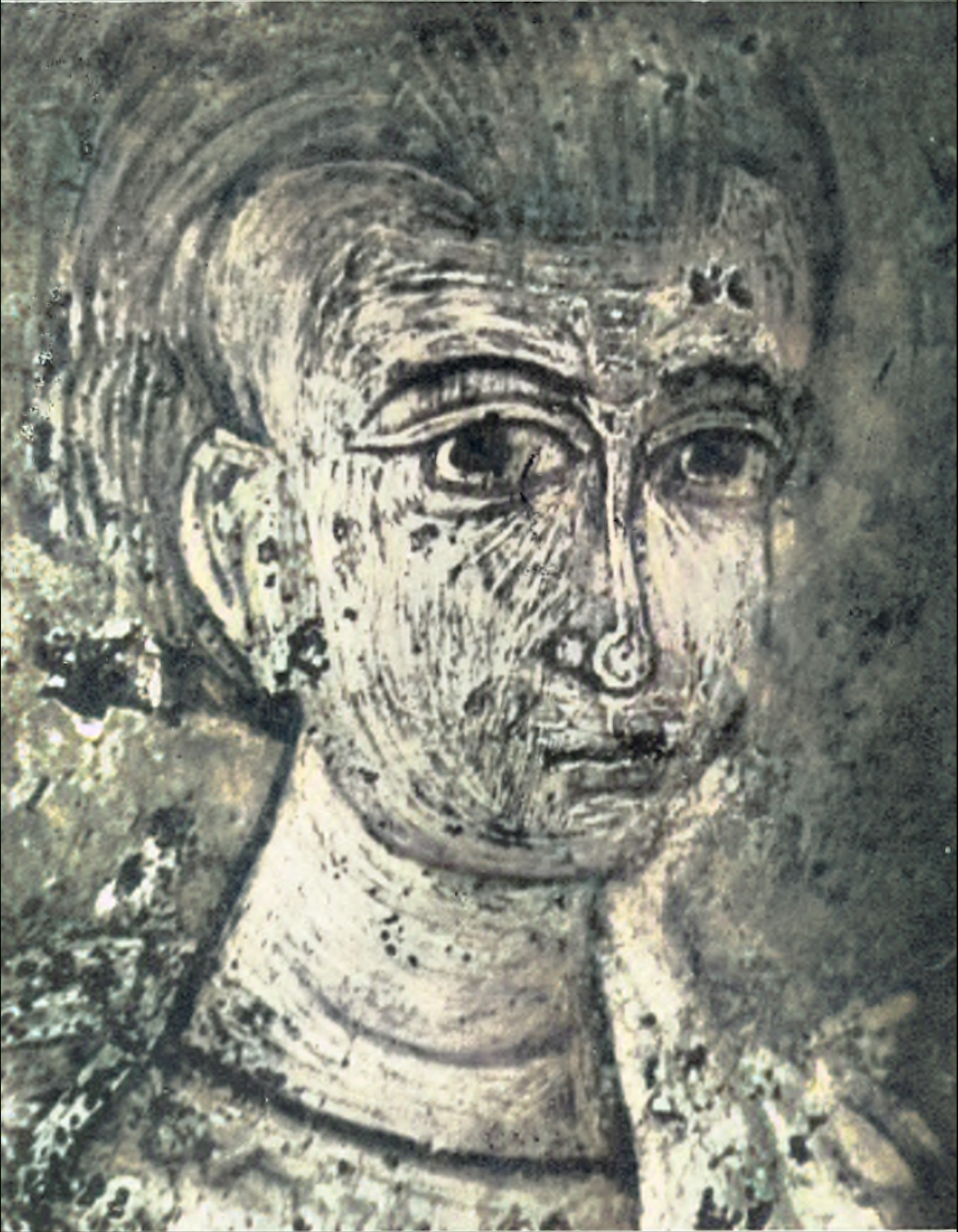
St Demetrius

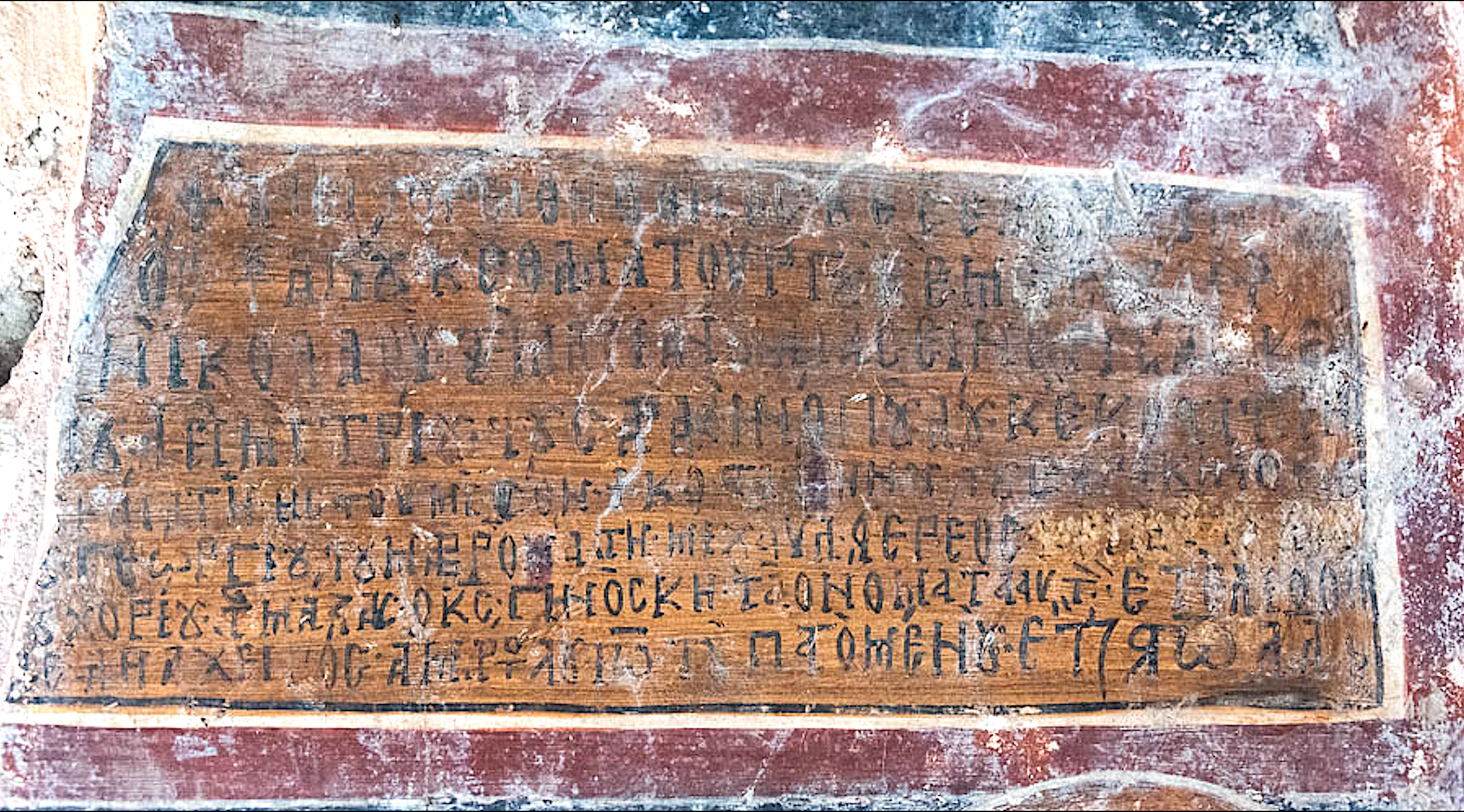
Signature inscription (St Nicholas, Maza)

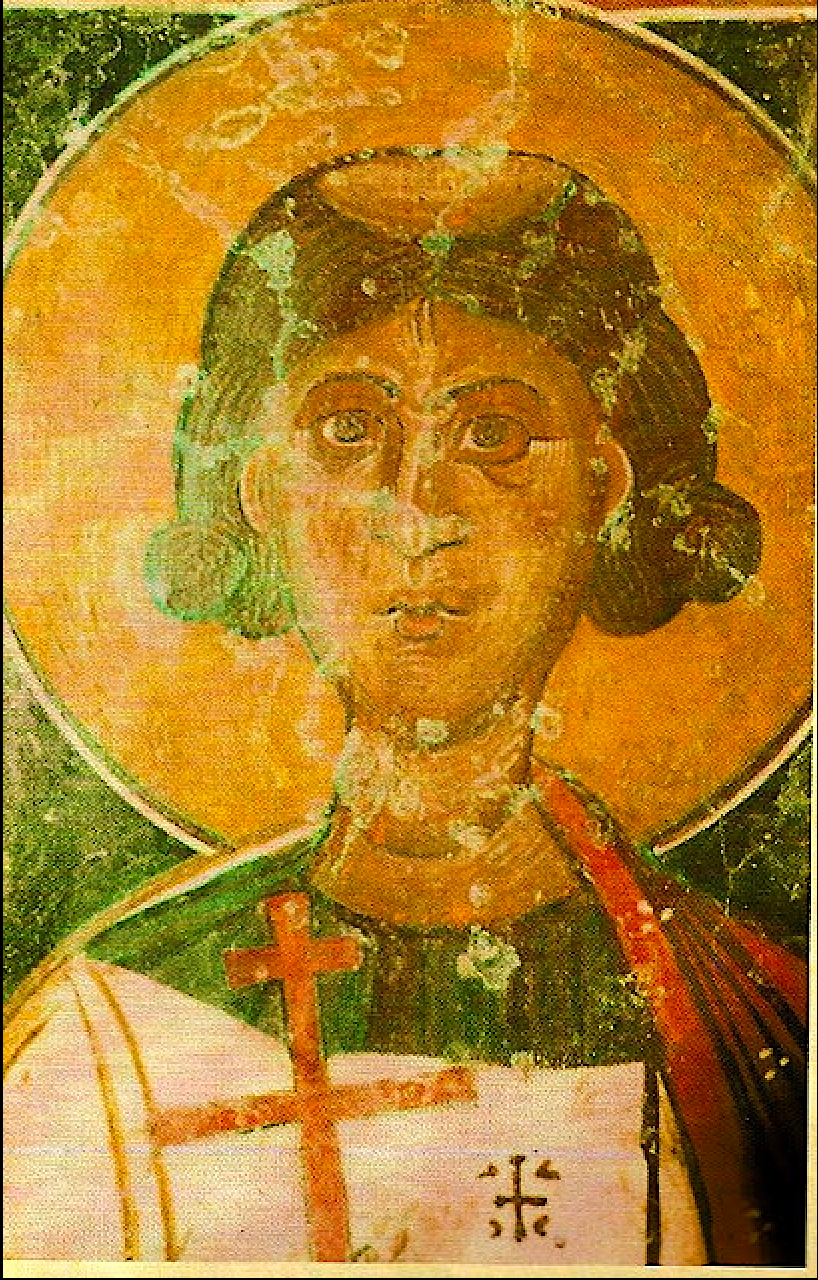
St Stephen

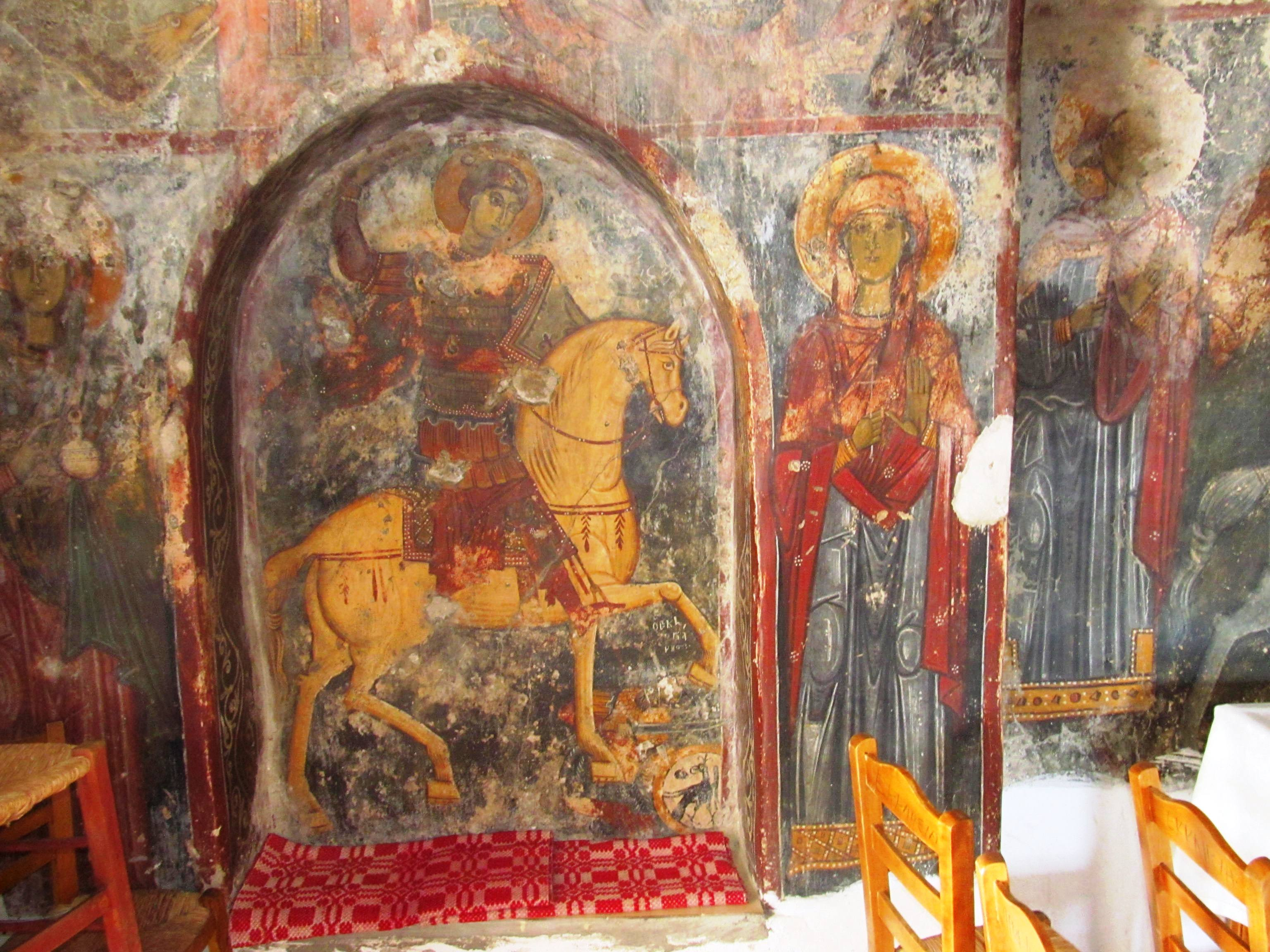
St George (St George, Anydroi)

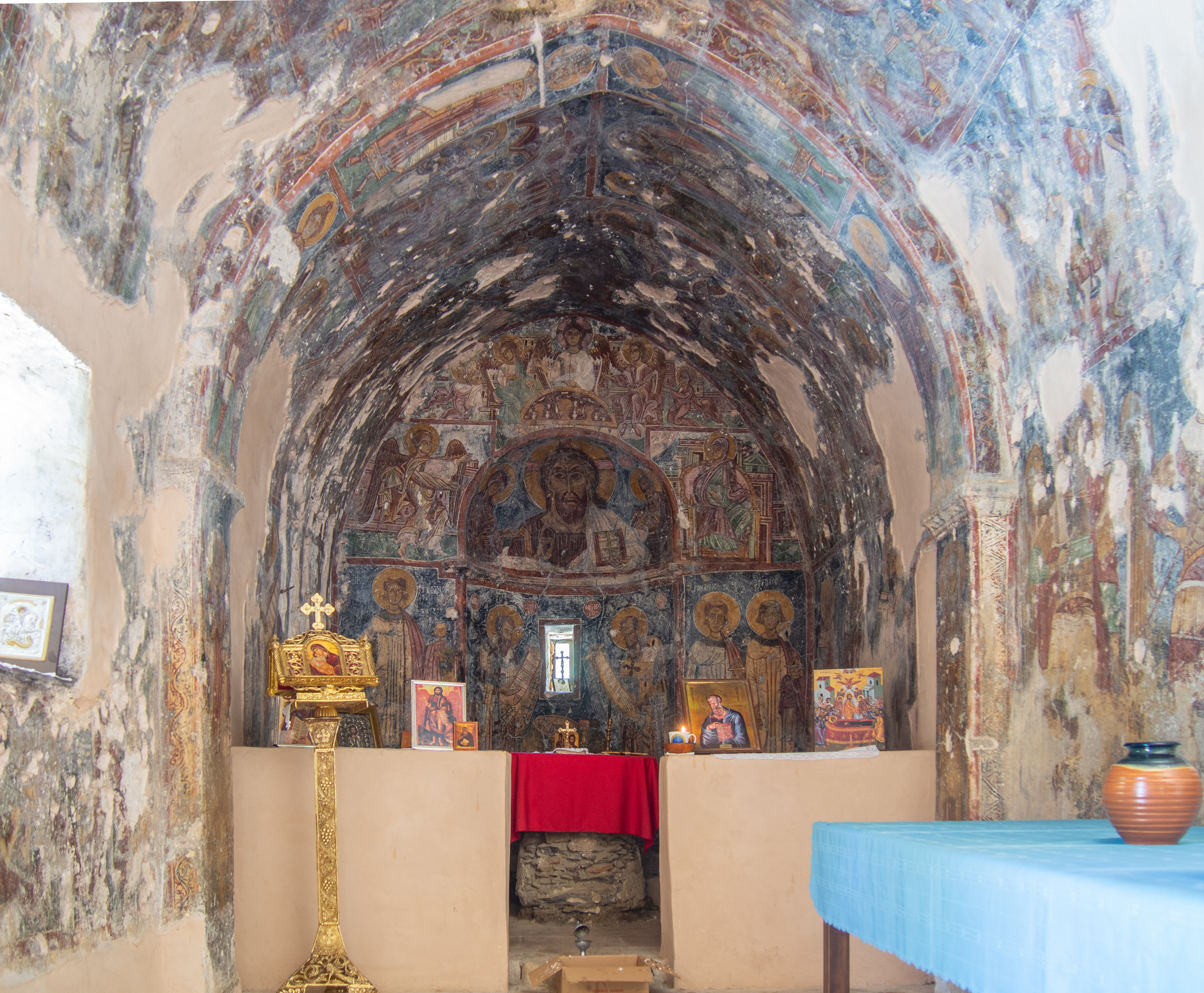
St John

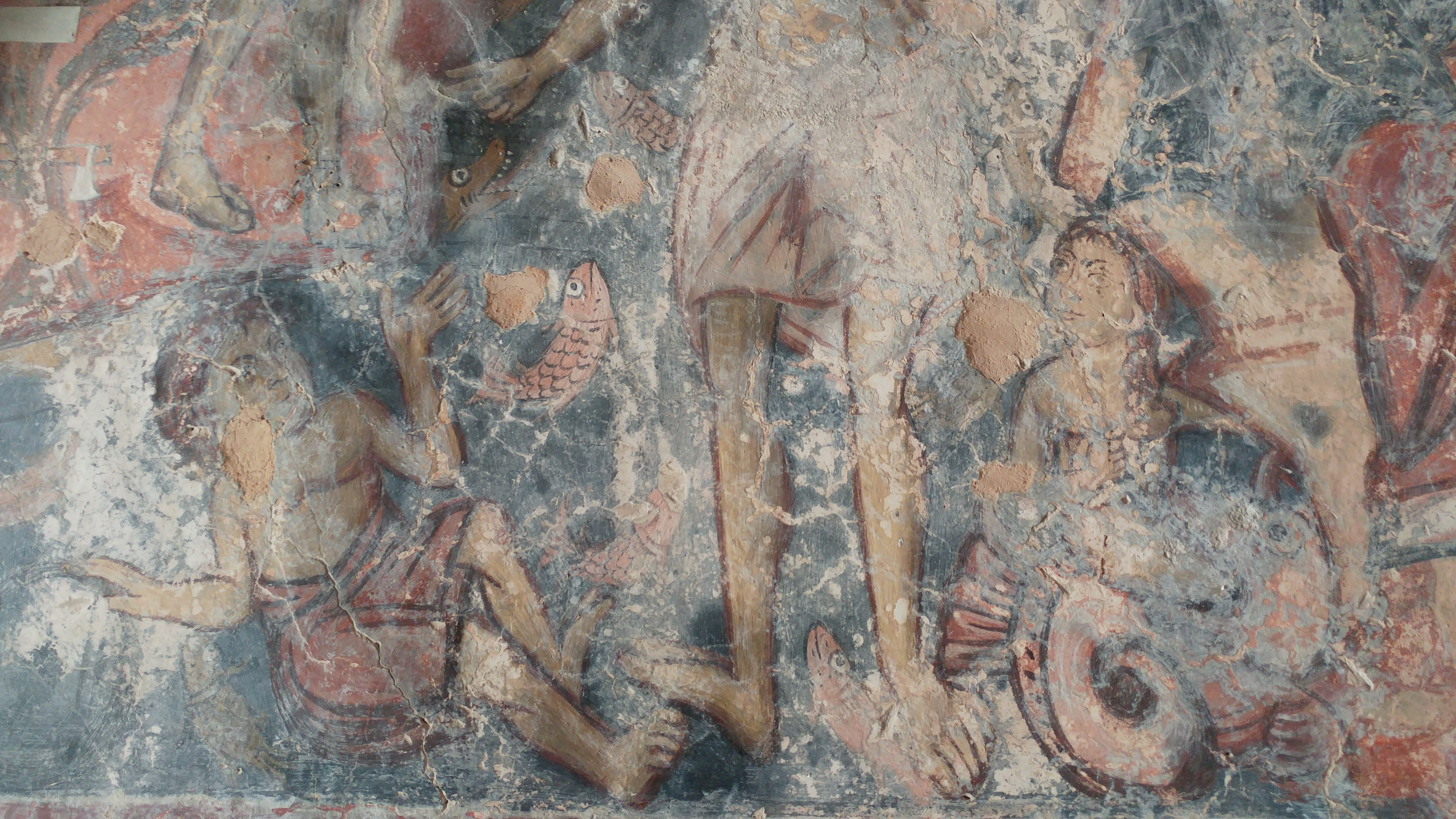
Baptism of Christ (detail) (St Nicholas, Maza)

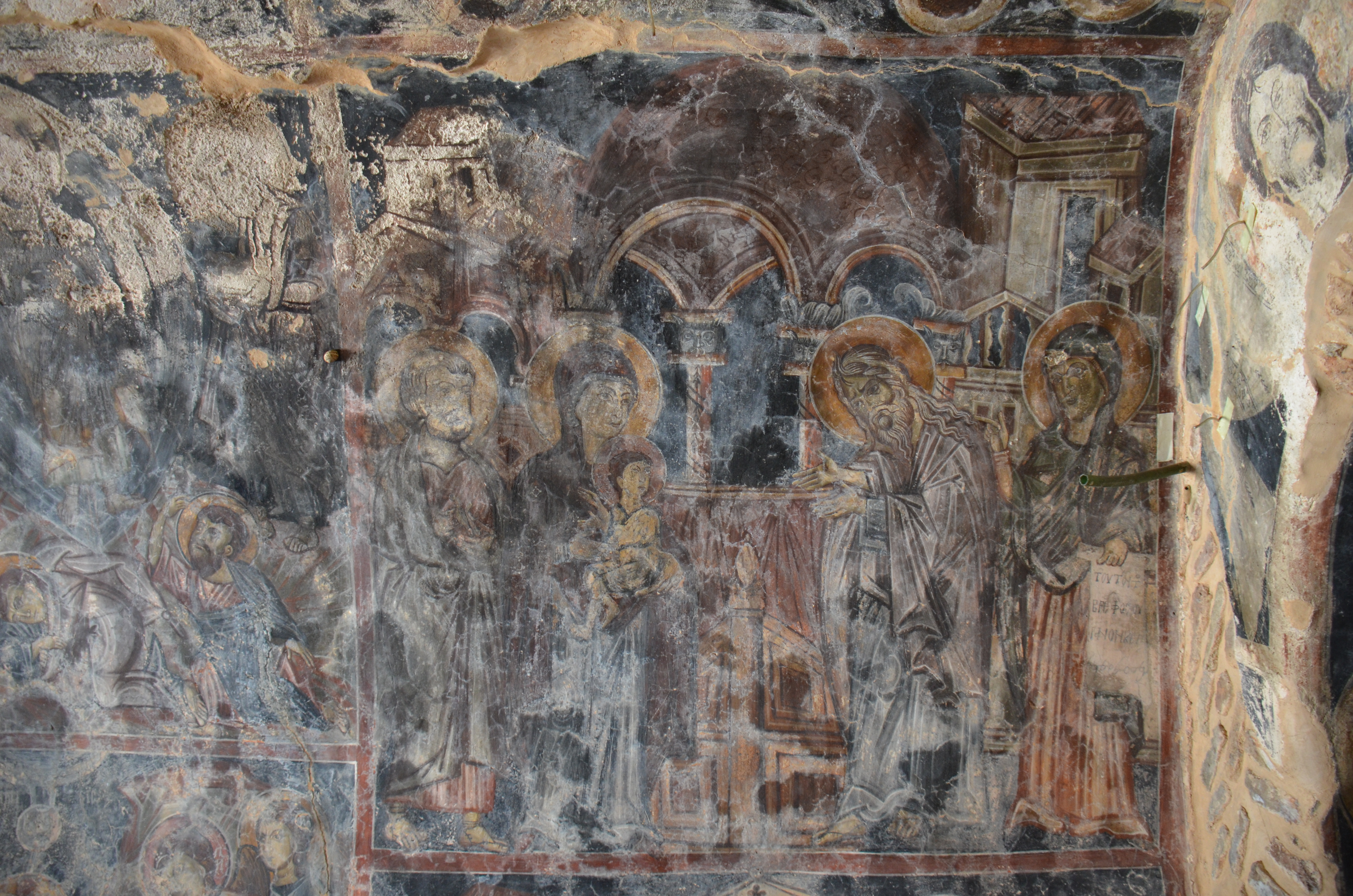
Presentation of Christ at the Temple (St Nicholas, Maza)

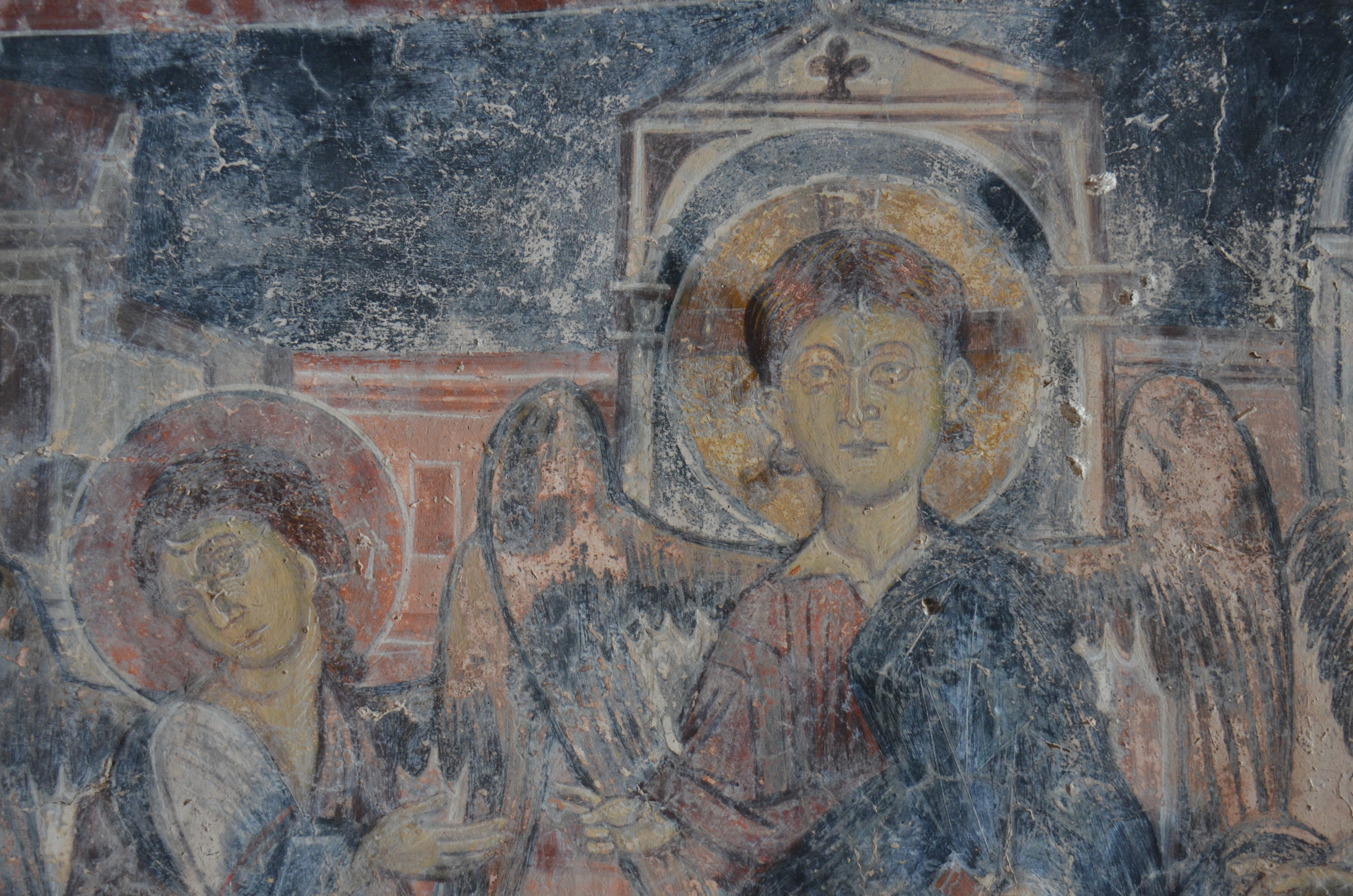
Hospitality of Abraham (detail) (St Nicholas, Maza)

== See also ==
- Fra Angelico
- Cimabue
- Duccio
- Gentile da Fabriano
- Maza, Crete
- Nikolaos Philanthropinos
