= Prodromi =

Prodromi Προδρόμι
- Settlement
- Location within Greece
- Coordinates: 35°15′50″N 23°45′30″E
- Country: Greece
- Administrative region: Crete
- Regional unit: Chania
- Municipality: Kantanos-Selino
- Municipal unit: Pelekanos
- Community: Palaiochora
- Elevation: 535 m (1,755 ft)

Population (2021)
  - Total: 10
- Time zone: UTC+2 (EET)
  - Summer (DST): UTC+3 (EEST)
- Postal code: 731 00
- Area code: 28230
- Vehicle registration: ΧΝ

Prodromi is a village in the municipal unit of Pelekanos, Chania regional unit, Crete, Greece. The name of the village in the 18th century was "Peroudo Vrisi". The current name is from the church of Agios Ioannis Prodromos. It is a nice community unspoiled from tourist exploitation surrounded by natural mountain view beauty of Cretan earth.

The area is covered with picturesque hills and beyond them steep mountain-sides in a magnificent landscape. There are protected considerable archeological places like the area of Lissos which is a magnificent location that hosts a Temple devoted to Asklipio (god of medicine) and a natural spring with curing water, a Roman grave yard and one of the first Byzantine Churches in the province of Selino at Chania. Yrtakina is an ancient city from the prehistoric period with a castle made from giant rocks.

Main produce is olive oil. The production of wine from viticulture in dry rocky fertile ground. Dairy products from goats and sheep. The main church is Agios Charalambos located near the nice neighbourhood of “Halliliana”. There is an annual celebration for the name day of the church. Until recently the village did not have any modern roads but today it can be reached via a narrow modern asphalt covered road from one side leading to the nearby town of Paleochora. The north approach to the village demanded a 4x4 off-road car or other durable vehicle up until the end of 2008 when a new asphalt covered road was constructed. This has protected the area and the environment has remained calm and unspoiled.

== The Panagia Church ==
In the village of Prodromi, at Skafidia, is the Byzantine church of the Panagia. The north road from Prodromi passes below the church, which can be seen from far away on the side of the mountain. The church of the Panagia has tooth-brick decorations on its east side and frescoes (formerly attributed to Ioannis Pagomenos) dating back to 1347.
