= Skafi =

Skafi Σκάφη
- Community
- Location within Greece
- Coordinates: 35°19′23″N 23°47′20″E
- Country: Greece
- Administrative region: Crete
- Regional unit: Chania
- Municipality: Kantanos-Selino
- Municipal unit: East Selino

Population (2021)
  - Community: 83
- Time zone: UTC+2 (EET)
  - Summer (DST): UTC+3 (EEST)

Skafi (Greek: Σκάφη) is a community and a small village in Chania regional unit on the island of Crete, Greece. It is part of the municipal unit of East Selino (Anatoliko Selino). The community consists of the following villages (population in 2021):

- Skafi, pop. 45
- Argastiri, pop. 12
- Pera Skafi, pop. 26
