= Livada =

Livada may refer to:

- Several places in Bulgaria:
  - Livada, Burgas, a village in Kameno Municipality, Burgas Province
- Several places in Greece:
  - Livada, Crete, a village in Chania regional unit in Crete
  - Livada, Tinos, a village on the island of Tinos
- Several places in Romania:
  - Livada, Satu Mare, a town in Satu Mare County, and its village of Livada Mică
  - Livada, Arad, a commune in Arad County
  - Livada, a village in Dobârceni Commune, Botoşani County
  - Livada and Livada Mică, villages in Grebănu Commune, Buzău County
  - Livada, a village in Iclod Commune, Cluj County
  - Livada, a village in Petreștii de Jos Commune, Cluj County
  - Livada, a village in Tomeşti Commune, Hunedoara County
  - Livada, a village in Mera Commune, Vrancea County
- Several places in the Republic of Macedonia:
  - Livada, Struga, a village in the Struga Municipality
