= Maralia =

Maralia may refer to:

- a synonym for Polyscias, a genus of flowering plants
- Maralia, a small village in the community of Kampanos, Crete, Greece
