= Pelekanos =

Pelekanos Πελεκάνος
- Municipal unit
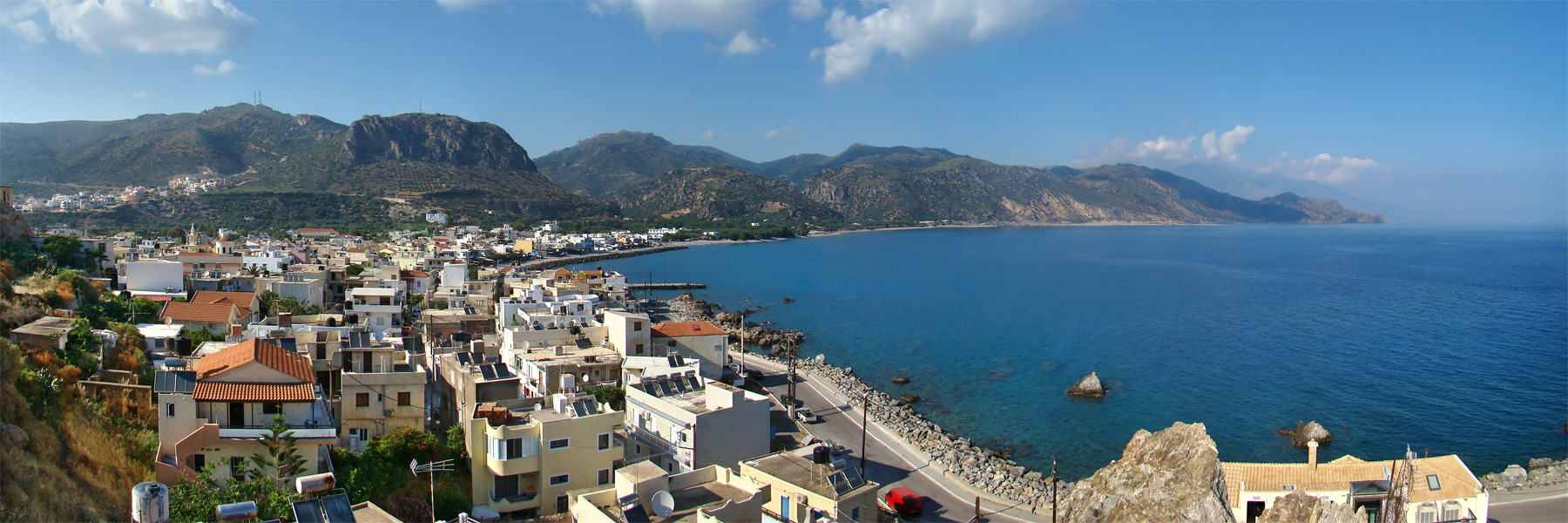
- Palaiochora

- Location within the regional unit

- Location within Greece
- Coordinates: 35°14′N 23°41′E
- Country: Greece
- Administrative region: Crete
- Regional unit: Chania
- Municipality: Kantanos-Selino

Area
  - Municipal unit: 166.6 km^{2} (64.3 sq mi)

Population (2021)
  - Municipal unit: 3,356
  - Municipal unit density: 20.14/km^{2} (52.17/sq mi)
- Time zone: UTC+2 (EET)
  - Summer (DST): UTC+3 (EEST)
- Postal code: 730 01
- Area code: 28230
- Vehicle registration: ΧΝ

Pelekanos (Greek: Δήμος Πελεκάνου) is a former municipality in the Chania regional unit, Crete, Greece. Since the 2011 local government reform it is part of the municipality Kantanos-Selino, of which it is a municipal unit. The municipal unit has an area of 166.618 km^{2} (64.332 sq mi). Pelekanos is in the south west corner of the island, part of the rugged and remote Selino Province. The Venetians built a castle - Kastel Selinou - at Palaiochora, giving the region its name. Palaiochora is now a growing coastal resort and the capital town of the municipality.

There are 35 villages in Pelekanos including:

- Palaiochora
- Prodromi
- Koundoura
- Anidri
- Voutas
- Sklavopoula
- Sarakina
- Spaniakos

== See also ==
- List of settlements in the Chania regional unit
