= Kandanos =

Kandanos Κάνδανος
- Municipal unit
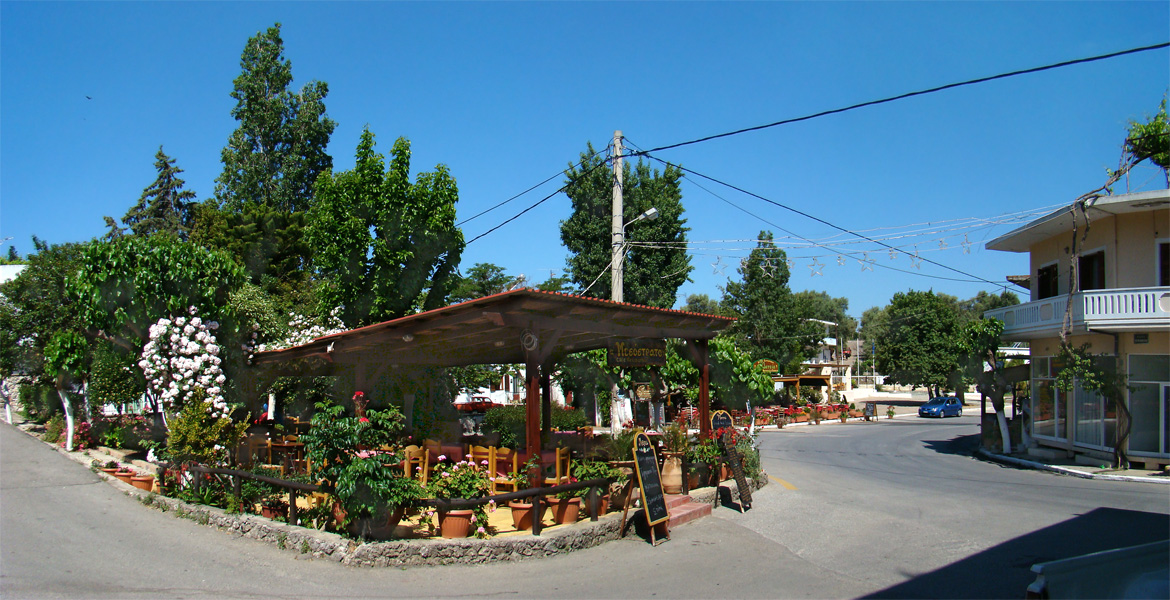
- Kandanos centre

- Location within the regional unit

- Location within Greece
- Coordinates: 35°19′37″N 23°44′30″E
- Country: Greece
- Administrative region: Crete
- Regional unit: Chania
- Municipality: Kantanos-Selino

Area
  - Municipal unit: 73.1 km^{2} (28.2 sq mi)

Population (2021)
  - Municipal unit: 893
  - Municipal unit density: 12.2/km^{2} (31.6/sq mi)
  - Community: 590
- Time zone: UTC+2 (EET)
  - Summer (DST): UTC+3 (EEST)
- Postal code: 730 04
- Area code: 28230
- Vehicle registration: ΧΝ, XB

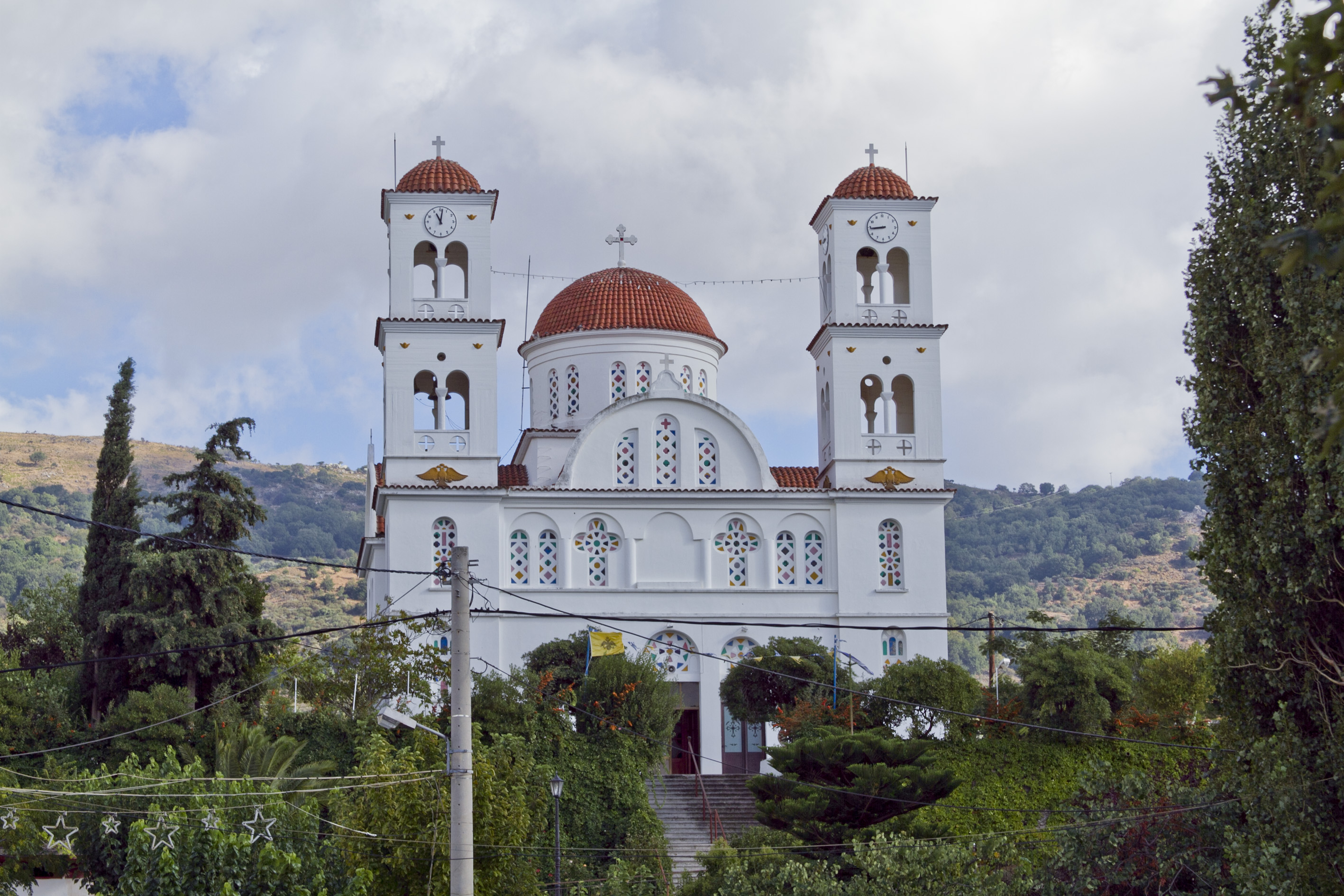
Kandanos church

Kandanos or Kantanos (Greek: Κάνδανος or Κάντανος), also Candanos, is a town and former municipality in the Chania regional unit, Crete, Greece. Since the 2011 local government reform it is part of the municipality Kantanos-Selino, of which it is a municipal unit. The municipal unit has an area of 73.081 km^{2} (28.217 sq mi). It was part of the former Selino Province which covered the southwest of the island. The community has 590 residents.

== History ==
Nearby is the site of the ancient town of Cantanus.

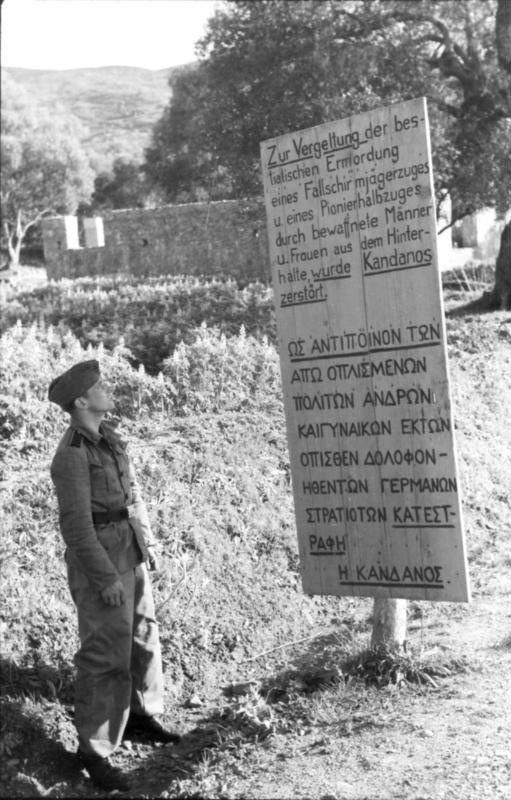
A German soldier in front of one of the signs erected after the razing. The text reads: "Kandanos was destroyed in retaliation for the bestial ambush murder of a paratrooper platoon and a half-platoon of military engineers by armed men and women."

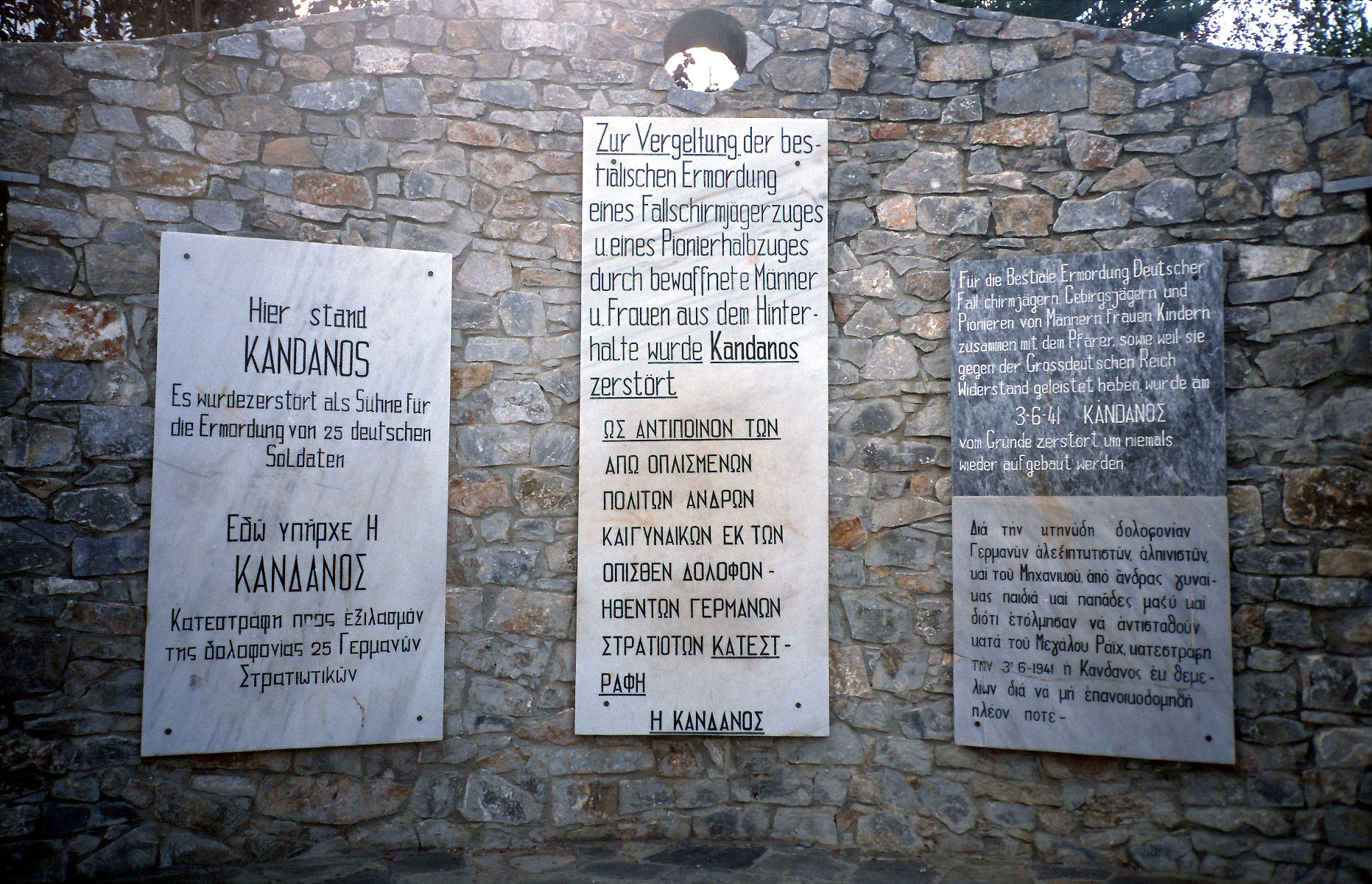
War memorial in Kandanos square

The town of Kandanos and its surrounding area suffered particularly badly from German occupation during World War II. During the Battle of Crete, resistance fighters had held advancing German soldiers for two days, preventing them from reaching Palaiochora to secure it. In retribution the occupiers razed the village to the ground and erected a sign: "Here stood Kandanos, destroyed in retribution for the murder of 25 German soldiers, never to be rebuilt again."

The town was rebuilt however, and the sign retained in a war memorial. Several of the Byzantine churches and their frescoes were restored. Germany donated waterworks after the war to the village and former soldiers stationed there returned in reconciliation.

Facilities include a health centre, a police station, a bank, a post-office, a pharmacy, and some shops, taverns and cafes. The municipality also includes 28 villages, like Anisaraki, Koufalotos, Plemeniana, Kadhros, Kakodiki and Floria.

== International relations ==
Kandanos is twinned with:

Country	Town	Since
Slovakia	Ostrý Grúň	1987
Djibouti	Arta	2011

== See also ==
- List of communities of Chania
- Lidice, a Czechoslovak village destroyed by Germany during World War II
