= Gianiskari, Crete =

Beaches in Crete, Greece

Gianiskari (also known as Gialiskari or Dialiskari (Greek: Γιανισκάρι ή Γιαλισκάρι ή Διαλισκάρι) is a cluster of three beaches in Greece located 4 km east of Paleochora and 80 km south of Chania city at the easternmost part of the coastline of Palaiochora. Two of the beaches have small pebbles and deep cool waters and the last one is a sandy beach.
