= Temenia =

Temenia Τεμένια
- Community
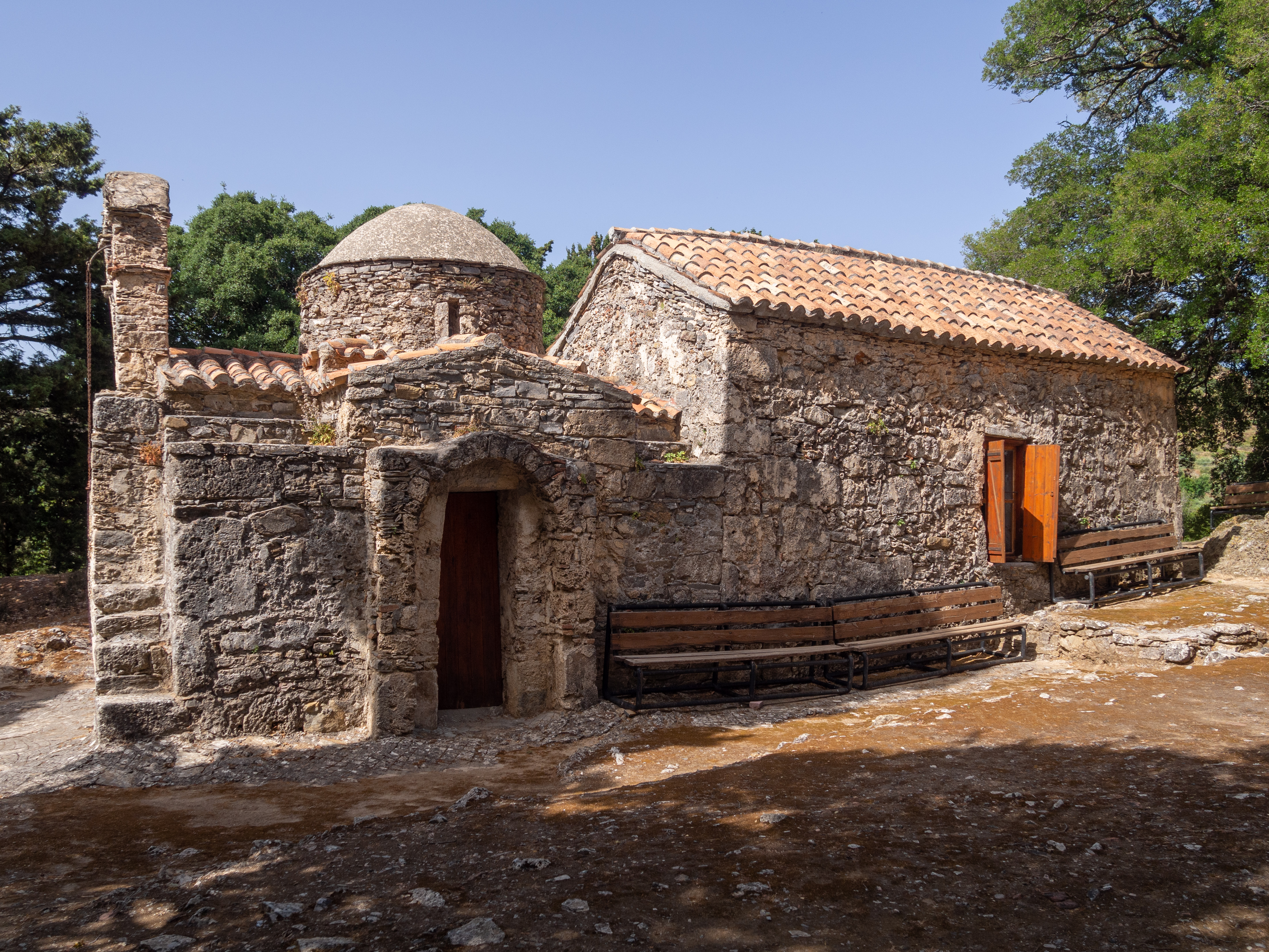
- The 14th century church of Jesus the Savior at Temenia

- Location within Greece
- Coordinates: 35°17′N 23°45′E
- Country: Greece
- Administrative region: Crete
- Regional unit: Chania
- Municipality: Kantanos-Selino
- Municipal unit: East Selino

Population (2021)
  - Community: 68
- Time zone: UTC+2 (EET)
  - Summer (DST): UTC+3 (EEST)

Temenia (Greek: Τεμένια) is a community and a small village in Chania regional unit on the island of Crete, Greece. It is part of the municipal unit of East Selino (Anatoliko Selino). The community consists of the following villages (population in 2021):

- Temenia, pop. 51
- Pappadiana, pop. 6
- Stratoi, pop. 11

Near Temenia is located the ancient city of Yrtakina. In Temenia also there is a spring-spa. Because of the healthy water, there is a small hotel and a refreshments factory in Temenia.
