= Gavdos =

Island in Greece

Gavdos Γαύδος
- Municipality
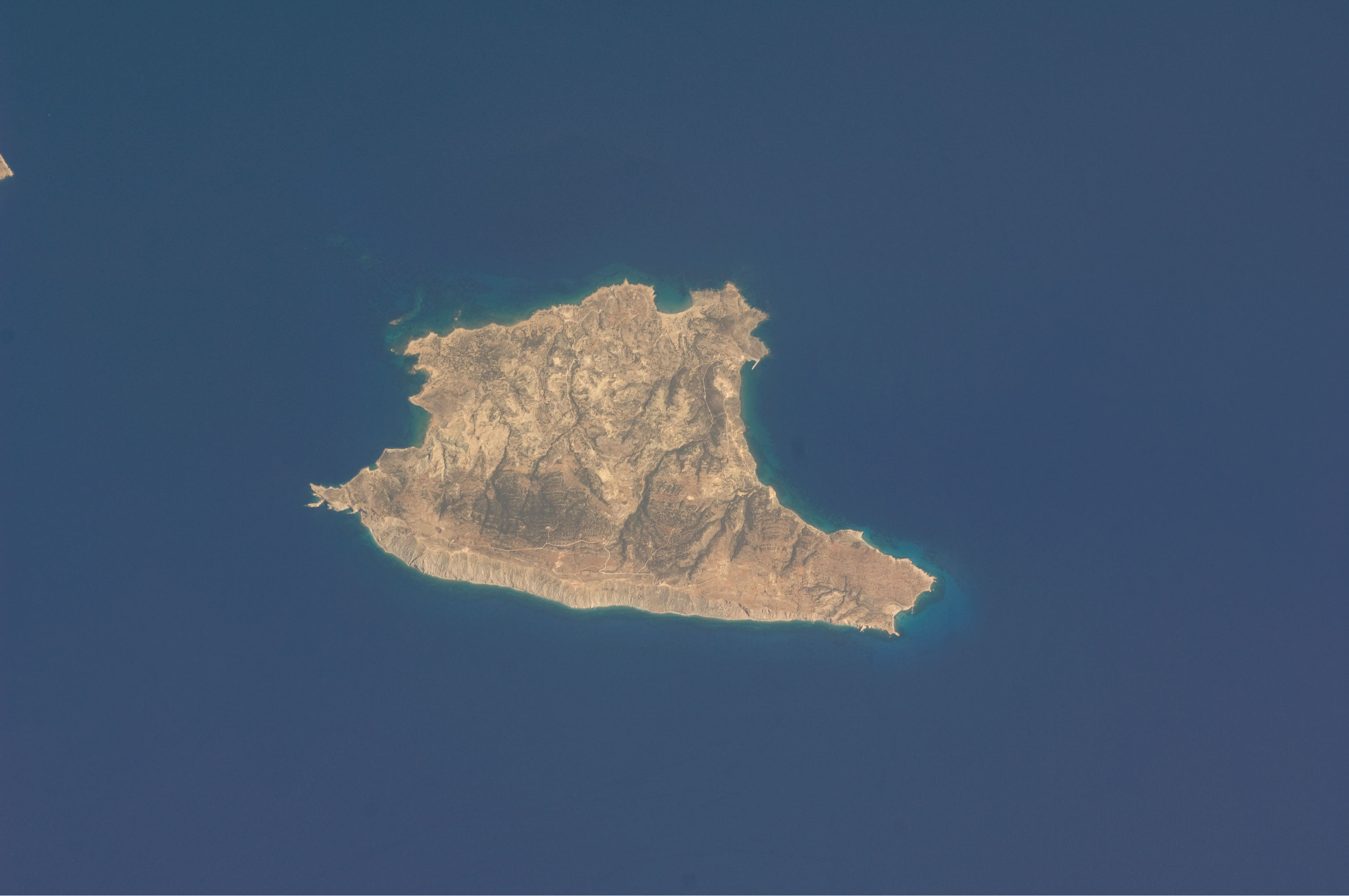
- Satellite image of Gavdos

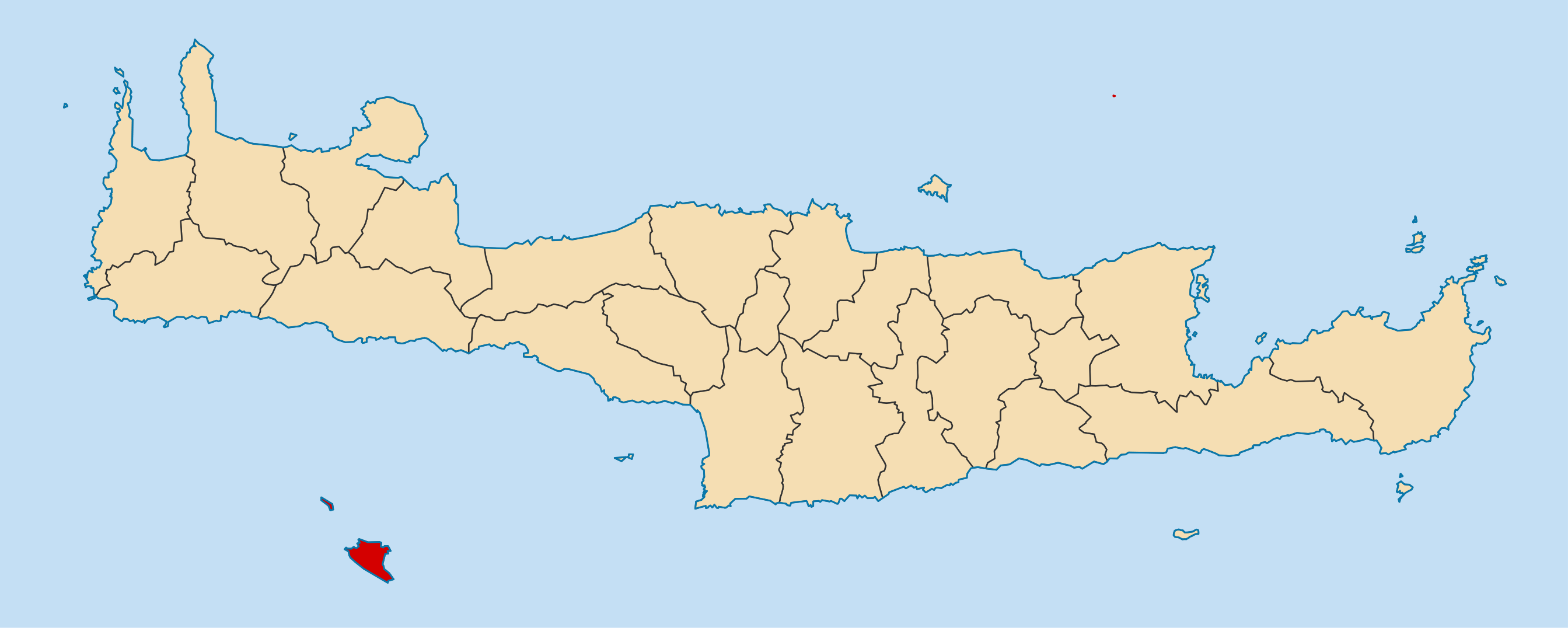

- Location within Greece
- Coordinates: 34°50′N 24°05′E
- Country: Greece
- Administrative region: Crete
- Regional unit: Chania
- Seat: Kastri

Area
  - Municipality: 32.4 km^{2} (12.5 sq mi)
- Highest elevation: 345 m (1,132 ft)
- Lowest elevation: 0 m (0 ft)

Population (2021)
  - Municipality: 142
  - Density: 4.38/km^{2} (11.4/sq mi)
- Time zone: UTC+2 (EET)
  - Summer (DST): UTC+3 (EEST)
- Postal code: 730 01
- Area code: 28230
- Vehicle registration: ΧΝ

Gavdos (Greek: Γαύδος [ˈɣavðos]) is the southernmost Greek island, located to the south of its much larger neighbour, Crete, of which it is administratively a part, in the regional unit of Chania. It forms a community with surrounding islets and was part of the former Selino Province.

== Name ==
Gavdos has been known by a wide variety of names. For example, it appears in the biblical account of Paul's journey to Rome in Acts 27 as "Clauda" (Κλαῦδα) or "Cauda" (Καῦδα). The island was also referred to as "Cauda" by Roman geographer Pomponius Mela, and as "Gaudos" by Pliny. Ptolemy called Gavdos "Claudos" (Κλαῦδος). The Venetians called it "Gotzo", perhaps in imitation of the Maltese island "Gozo". From the 17th to the 19th centuries, the island was known as "Gondzo". A Turkish name of Godzo was "Bougadoz".

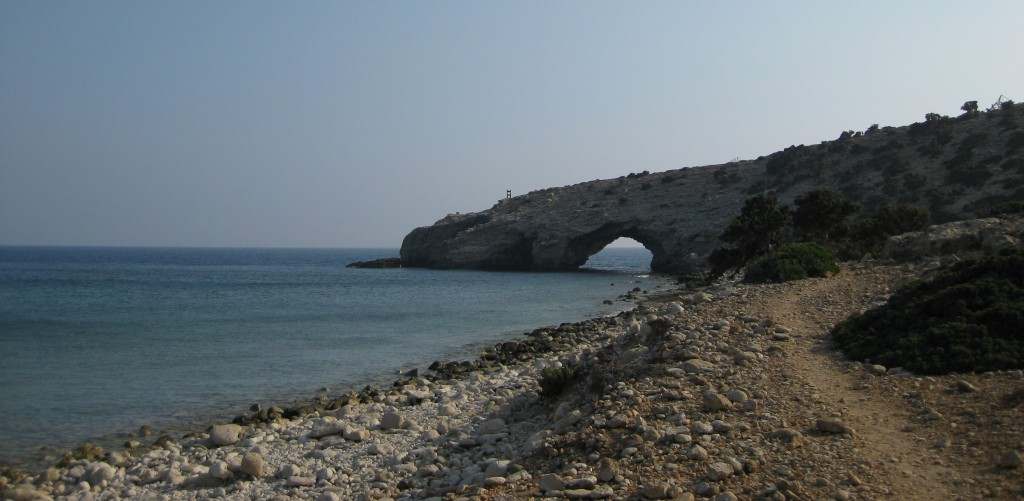
Cape Trypiti, the most southern point of Europe. The sculpture of the oversized chair is visible.

== Geography ==
The island is 26 nautical miles (48 km) south of Chora Sfakion. The area of the municipality, which includes the small island Gavdopoula, is 32.424 square kilometres (12.5 sq mi). The island is roughly triangular in shape. Its highest point is Mount Vardia, 345 metres (1,132 feet). The southeastern corner is a rocky peninsula with a natural arch carved by the elements, called Trypiti. A concrete sculpture of an oversized chair, built by a group of Russians who came to the island in the 1990s, sits on top of Trypiti.

== Environment ==
There is an islet called Gavdopoula (Γαυδοπούλα, "little Gavdos") to the northwest of Gavdos. Gavdos and Gavdopoula are covered with phrygana (φρύγανα), low-lying shrubs. Both are important stops for migrating birds. Local birds include the Eurasian scops owl and the European shag. Both Gavdos and Gavdopoula have been designated by BirdLife International as an Important Bird Area (IBA). Gavdos also has a variety of other vegetation, such as maquis as well as forests of pines and junipers.

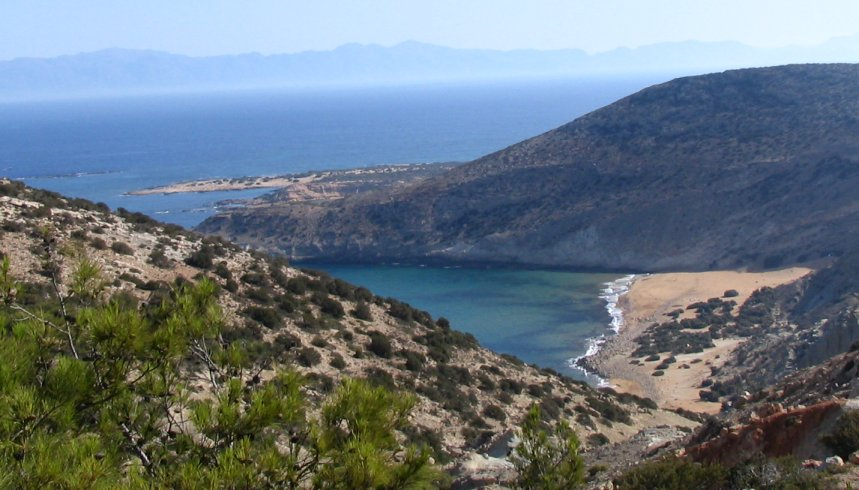
Potamos-beach on Gavdos with the island of Crete in the background.

== Climate ==
Gavdos is the southernmost island in Greece and all of Europe. The island has a hot semi-arid climate (Köppen climate classification: BSh). Summers are constantly hot, with daily temperatures reaching around 33 °C (91 °F) in July and August. Extremes are occasional, sometimes reaching up to 40 °C (104 °F), and it has extremely mild winters by European standards. January, the coldest month, has an average temperature around 14 °C (57 °F). The Mediterranean Sea is an important thermal regulator that surrounds its island in all its directions, while maintaining the high temperature of the sea, especially in summer passing from 26 °C (79 °F). The mild climate is aided by hot winds blowing from the Sahara Desert. As a result of the Subtropical High of the Azores precipitation is concentrated in winter, making summers dry with no precipitation days during July and August. It is one of the sunniest places in Europe, with the highest amounts of radiation: between 1800 and 1900 kWh/m^{2} (ideal for solar panels), values closer to North Africa and the Middle East. It falls in plant hardiness zone 11a.

Climate data for Gavdos 25 m a.s.l. (2016–2025)
Month	Jan	Feb	Mar	Apr	May	Jun	Jul	Aug	Sep	Oct	Nov	Dec	Year
Record high °C (°F)	20.2 (68.4)	19.8 (67.6)	23.9 (75.0)	27.2 (81.0)	36.3 (97.3)	41.5 (106.7)	43.2 (109.8)	39.8 (103.6)	34.9 (94.8)	32.3 (90.1)	27.1 (80.8)	22.1 (71.8)	43.2 (109.8)
Mean daily maximum °C (°F)	16.2 (61.2)	16.1 (61.0)	18.2 (64.8)	20.1 (68.2)	24.2 (75.6)	29.3 (84.7)	32.4 (90.3)	32.7 (90.9)	29.2 (84.6)	25.2 (77.4)	21.3 (70.3)	17.9 (64.2)	23.6 (74.4)
Daily mean °C (°F)	13.9 (57.0)	13.9 (57.0)	15.6 (60.1)	17.2 (63.0)	21.0 (69.8)	25.5 (77.9)	28.5 (83.3)	28.9 (84.0)	26.1 (79.0)	22.5 (72.5)	19.2 (66.6)	15.6 (60.1)	20.7 (69.2)
Mean daily minimum °C (°F)	11.7 (53.1)	11.6 (52.9)	12.9 (55.2)	14.4 (57.9)	17.7 (63.9)	21.6 (70.9)	24.5 (76.1)	25.1 (77.2)	23.0 (73.4)	19.9 (67.8)	17.0 (62.6)	13.2 (55.8)	17.7 (63.9)
Record low °C (°F)	3.9 (39.0)	7.3 (45.1)	7.7 (45.9)	8.7 (47.7)	13.1 (55.6)	16.6 (61.9)	21.6 (70.9)	21.7 (71.1)	19.2 (66.6)	14.7 (58.5)	10.0 (50.0)	6.4 (43.5)	3.9 (39.0)
Average rainfall mm (inches)	71.1 (2.80)	39.5 (1.56)	42.0 (1.65)	12.3 (0.48)	12.2 (0.48)	8.8 (0.35)	0.0 (0.0)	0.03 (0.00)	22.2 (0.87)	48.6 (1.91)	48.2 (1.90)	86.7 (3.41)	391.63 (15.41)
Source: Gavdos Municipality Davis station (Sep 2016 – Feb 2025)

== Demographics ==
There are only a small number of year-round residents of Gavdos and services for tourists are basic. As of 2021, the resident population of Gavdos was 142. In the summer the total people on the island can reach over 3,500, most of whom are campers and tourists. The largest man-made harbour is at Karave. The island's capital is Kastri. The southernmost populated village is Vatsiana, with a total permanent population of 31 people. Fokia (with Korfos beach area), Ampelos and the area around Sarakiniko beach are the other main populated places.

== History ==
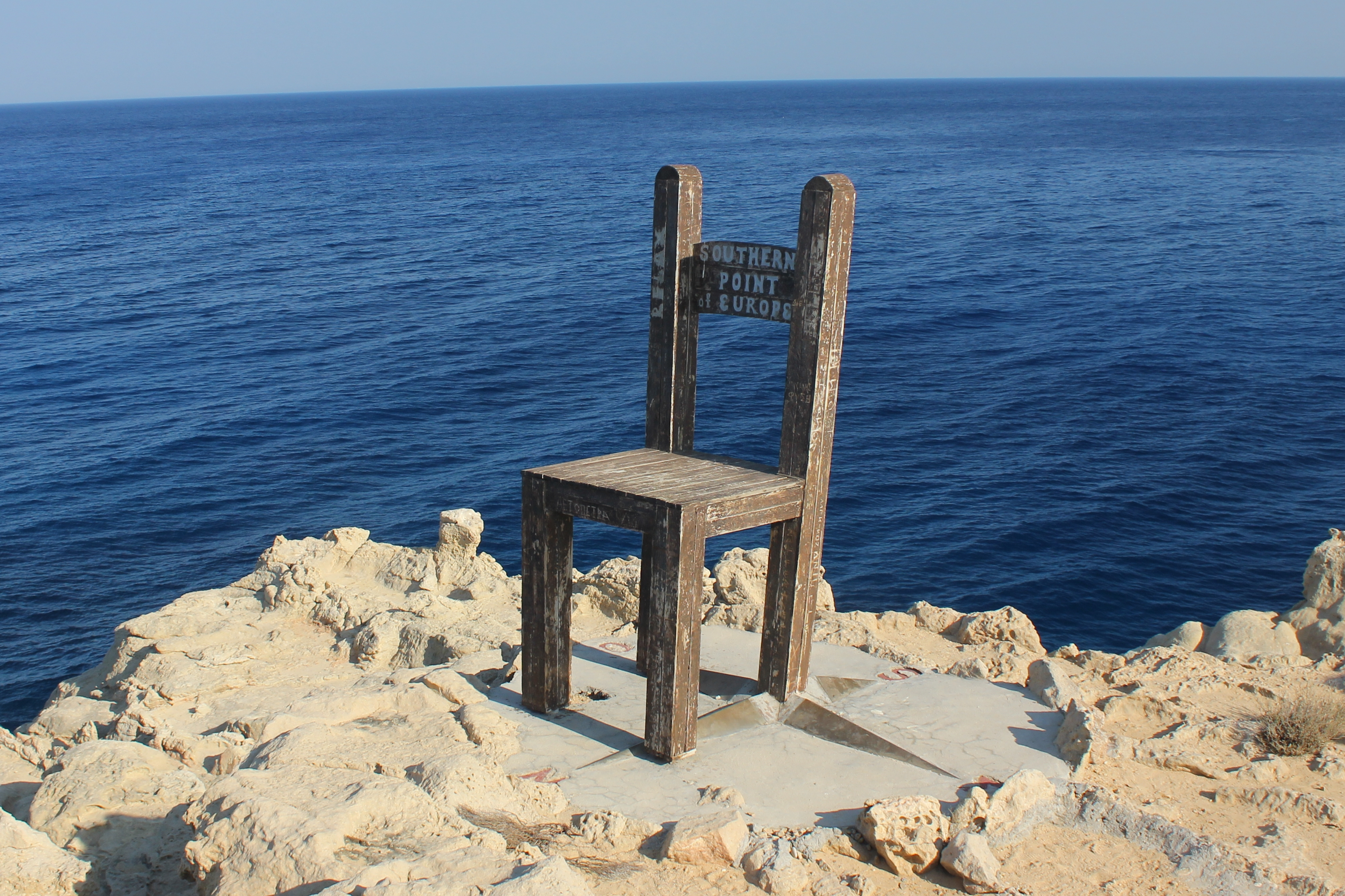
The wooden chair on Gavdos (Cape Tripiti) that symbolizes the southernmost point of Europe.

Gavdos has supported a permanent population since Neolithic times and the Bronze Age.

Gavdos has been identified as a possible site of the mythical Ogygia where Kalypso held Odysseus prisoner. Archaeological evidence showed that the Roman Empire was active on the island. During that time, the flora of the island was overexploited, starting a process of erosion which has continued to this day.

Gavdos, under the name of Cauda, was briefly referenced in the Bible's New Testament in the book of Acts. Whilst Paul is being transported to Rome as a prisoner, the ship encounters a storm: "As we passed to the lee of a small island called Cauda, we were hardly able to make the lifeboat secure..." (Acts 27:16 NIV). They eventually shipwrecked in Malta.

Gavdos had approximately 8,000 inhabitants by 900 AD. During the Ottoman Empire's reign on the island, which lasted from 1665 until 1895, Gavdos was known as Gondzo. During this period the population decreased considerably to only 500 by 1882. A reference to Saracens on the island survives: the beach Sarakiniko ("of the Saracens").

In the 1930s, the island was used as a place of exile for communists; more than 250 people were exiled including leading figures of the Greek movement, such as Markos Vafiadis and Aris Velouchiotis. During World War II, some Allied forces evacuated to Gavdos following the German victory in the Battle of Crete. Gavdos was then occupied by the Axis powers from June 1941 until liberation in October 1944.

Later on, the general phase of urbanization that started in other parts of Greece in the 1960s took place in the 1950s on Gavdos. During that period the islanders exchanged their land on Gavdos with ex-Turkish land on Crete, which had now become exchangeable via the state. Upon settling in Crete they created a community known as Gavdiotika, which is part of the town of Paleochora.

In 2025, mass arrivals of North African migrants led to a humanitarian crisis.

== Economy ==
There are many abandoned terraces on Gavdos where farmers used to grow crops on the hillsides. There still is some agriculture on Gavdos. During the summer, the population of the island swells to a few thousand because of tourists. There is a modern non-functioning reproduction lighthouse tower on Gavdos which now serves as a cafe during the summer season; the complex also contains a museum on the history of the original lighthouse with several rooms of photos and antique equipment. Gavdos has an FM radio station, Gavdos FM 88.8, which is also available online.

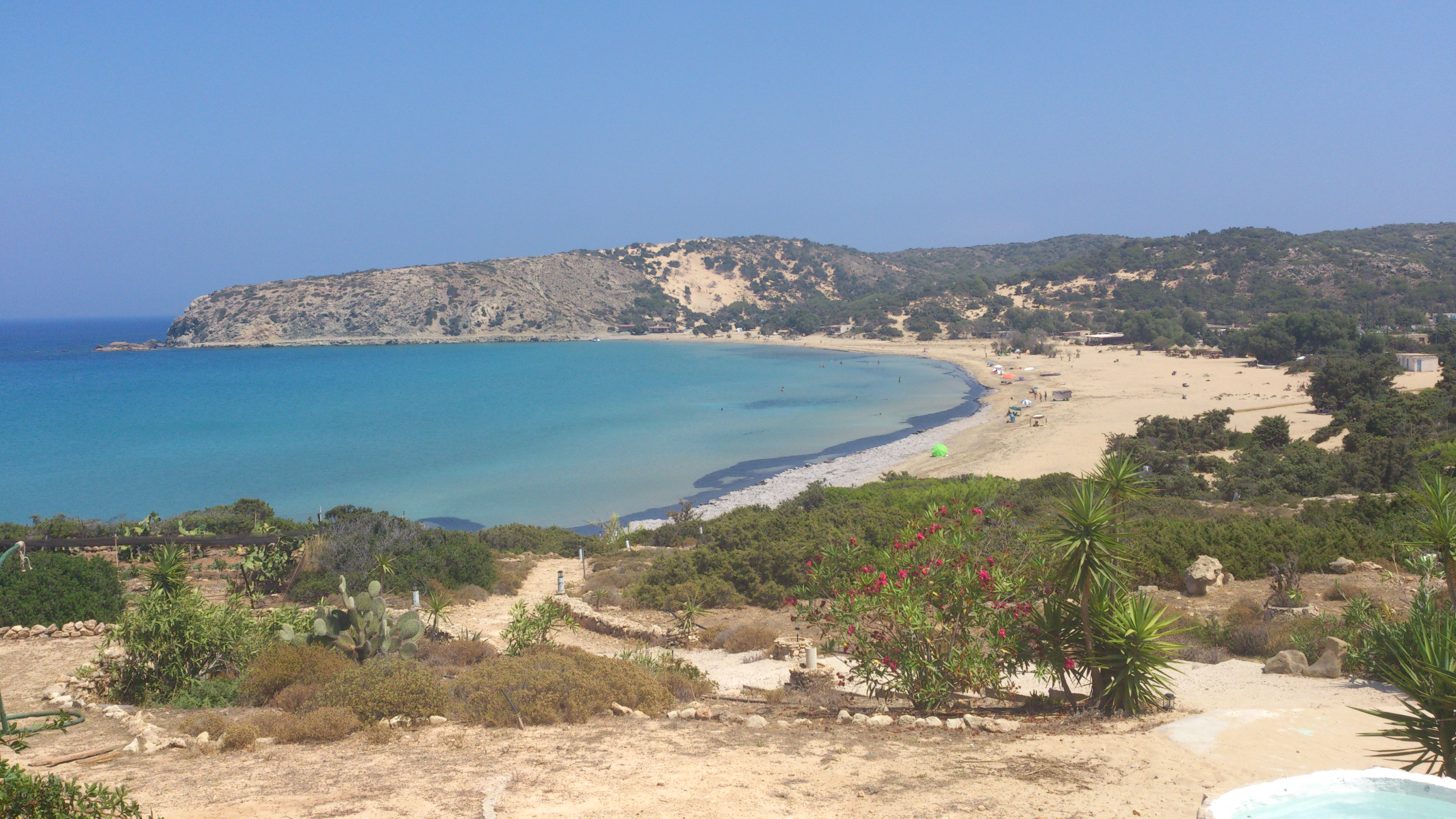
A beach on the northern part of the island

== Transport ==
Ferries connect the port of Karave with those of Paleochora, Sougia, Agia Roumeli, Loutro and Hóra Sfakíon. There is a heliport in the northern part of the island. Bus services connect the island's main locations. The island's road network is a mixture of paved, unsurfaced and dirt roads.

== Politics ==
Following years of isolation, in 1996 the island came to media prominence. In a NATO exercise Gavdos was the focal point of a confrontation between Greece and Turkey. Following that, Prime Minister Costas Simitis visited Gavdos and announced a five-year, €1.5 million plan for the island's development.

In 2001, Costis Stephanopoulos, the Greek President, inaugurated a telemedicine centre on Gavdos, an island which has not had a full-time doctor in recent memory. This effort, however, was marred as the island's infrastructure could not provide the necessary power required by the centre. For the purposes of the inauguration, generators were brought in, which were then removed. However, according to a 2008 BBC News report the island now features stable electrical power, and young medical graduates can serve for six months on Gavdos in lieu of compulsory military service. But visitors to Gavdos in June 2008 found that the power station was not functioning and that businesses were relying on gas generators operated for a few hours per night; locals stated that the power station worked initially, but no longer serves the entire island reliably.

In 2002, the island was in the news again, due to the arrests of members of the extremist Marxist group 17 November. The leader of this organization had been living openly for several years on Gavdos as a beekeeper.

For the first time, a military outpost was established on the Island of Gavdos by the Greek defence ministry on 30 November 2020. The ministry announced plans of doing the same at the Othonoi island, the westernmost point of the country, following the establishment at the southernmost point of Greece. A total of nine soldiers were deployed at the outpost in Gavdos at the Cape Tripiti. The decision followed the announcement made by the ministry of expanding Greek territorial waters to 12 nautical miles in the Ionian Sea.

== Gavdos in literature ==
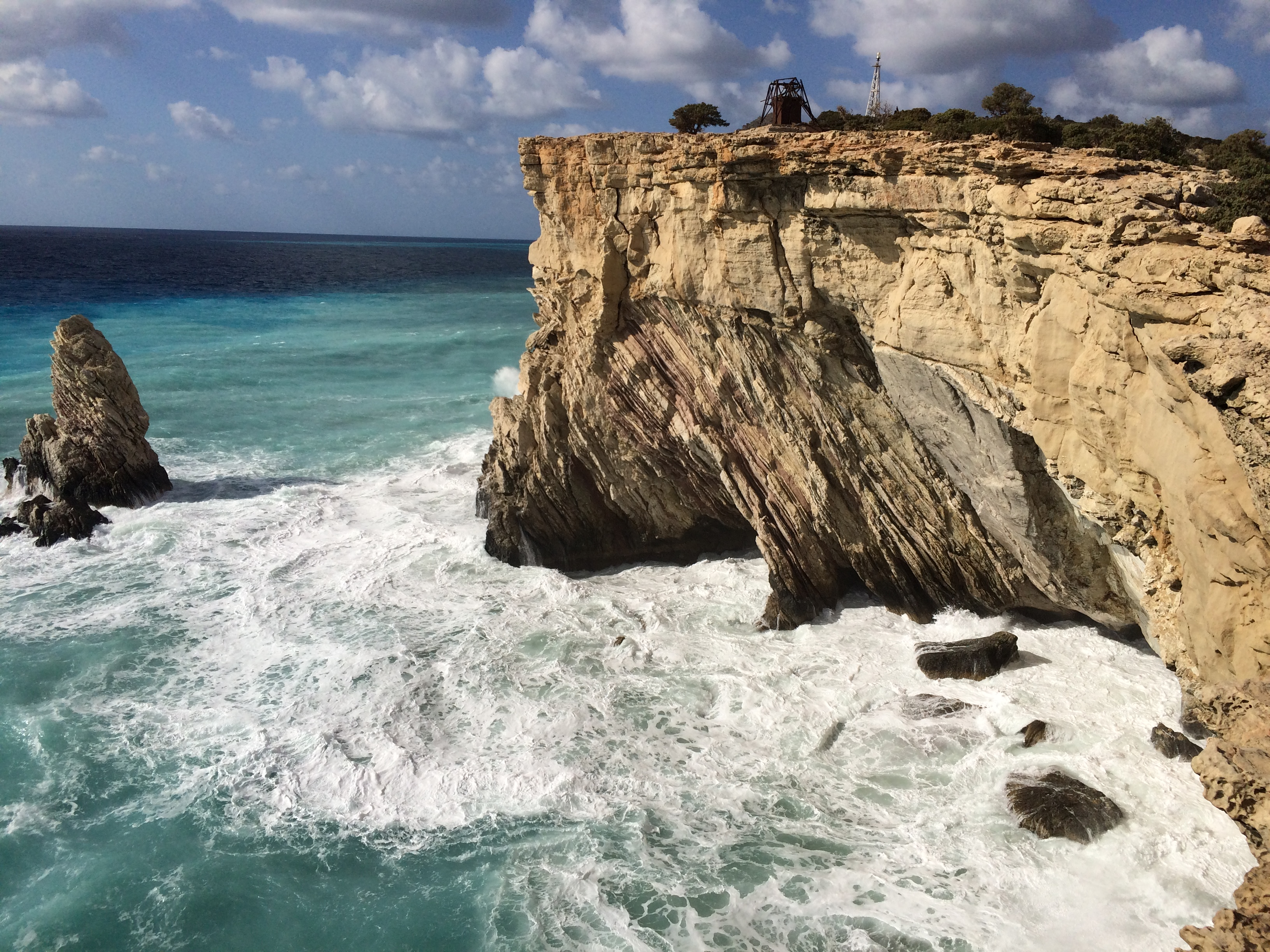
Rocky coast of the southern part of Gavdos

Gavdos is featured in James Aldridge's 1944 novel The Sea Eagle, which tells the story of the escape of a Greek partisan and two Australian soldiers after the Battle of Crete. The three join an expedition to liberate some Cretan fishermen from a Metaxas-era prison on the eastern end of the island. The attack on the cliffs of Khavro Spahti Bay is described in Chapters 24–28.

== See also ==
- List of communities of Chania
- Geography of the Levantine Sea
