= Kampanos =

Kampanos Καμπανός
- Community
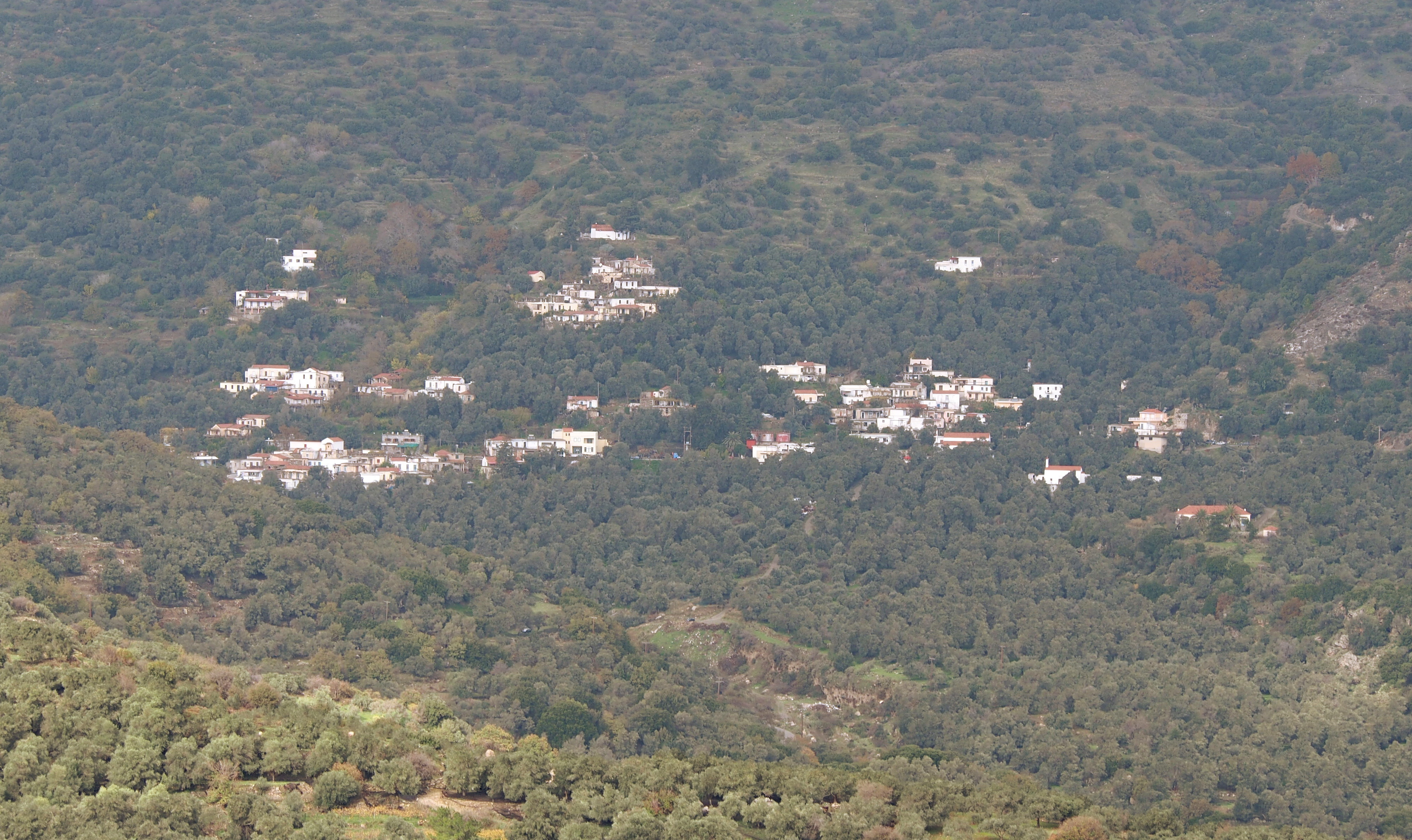
- Kampanos as seen from south

- Location within Greece
- Coordinates: 35°18′40″N 23°47′53″E
- Country: Greece
- Administrative region: Crete
- Regional unit: Chania
- Municipality: Kantanos-Selino
- Municipal unit: East Selino

Population (2021)
  - Community: 98
- Time zone: UTC+2 (EET)
  - Summer (DST): UTC+3 (EEST)

Kampanos (Greek: Καμπανός) is a community and a village in Chania regional unit on the island of Crete, Greece. It is the seat of the municipal unit of East Selino (Anatoliko Selino). The community consists of the following villages (population in 2021):

- Kampanos, pop. 92
- Maralia, pop. 6

The village is in a basin surrounded by very old olive oil trees, close to the village an old school is located which is the town hall of East Selino. The village is 52 km from Chania city center, about 1.10 hours.
