= Agia Eirini, Chania =

Agia Eirini Αγία Ειρήνη
- Settlement
- Location within Greece
- Coordinates: 35°20′N 23°49′E
- Country: Greece
- Administrative region: Crete
- Regional unit: Chania
- Municipality: Kantanos-Selino
- Municipal unit: East Selino
- Community: Epanochori
- Elevation: 606 m (1,988 ft)

Population (2021)
  - Total: 58
- Time zone: UTC+2 (EET)
  - Summer (DST): UTC+3 (EEST)
- Postal code: 73009
- Area code: +30 28230

Agia Eirini (Αγία Ειρήνη) is a small community in Western Crete, population 58 (2021 census). It lies in the Chania regional unit which constitutes the western part of Crete. It is in the municipality of Kantanos-Selino, which forms the southwest part of the region, specifically the East Selino unit, and the community of Epanochori.

== Description ==
The importance of Agia Eirini lies in that constitutes the north end of the gorge that takes its name from this village. The gorge is popular with trekkers, bringing tourists north from the beach resort of Sougia where it ends. The valley itself continues some distance north of the village to the watershed dividing north and southern Crete. After pausing at Agia Eirini, the walk continues east to Omalos.

The village lies on the road from Chania to Sougia, 40 km south of Chania at an altitude of 650m, located at the foot of Apopigadi, south of Prases (in neighbouring Mousouroi, Platanias) on the north side of the pass, just past where the road branches east to Omalos at the wind turbine line on the ridge, and just north of Epanochori itself. Agia Eirini is nested between two smaller settlements, Koulouridiana to the north and Livadhaki to the south. The inhabitants are engaged in farming. Local produce includes chestnuts, honey and mournoraki (μουρνόρακη), a local spirit made from mulberries.
