= Rodovani =

Rodovani Ροδοβάνι
- Community
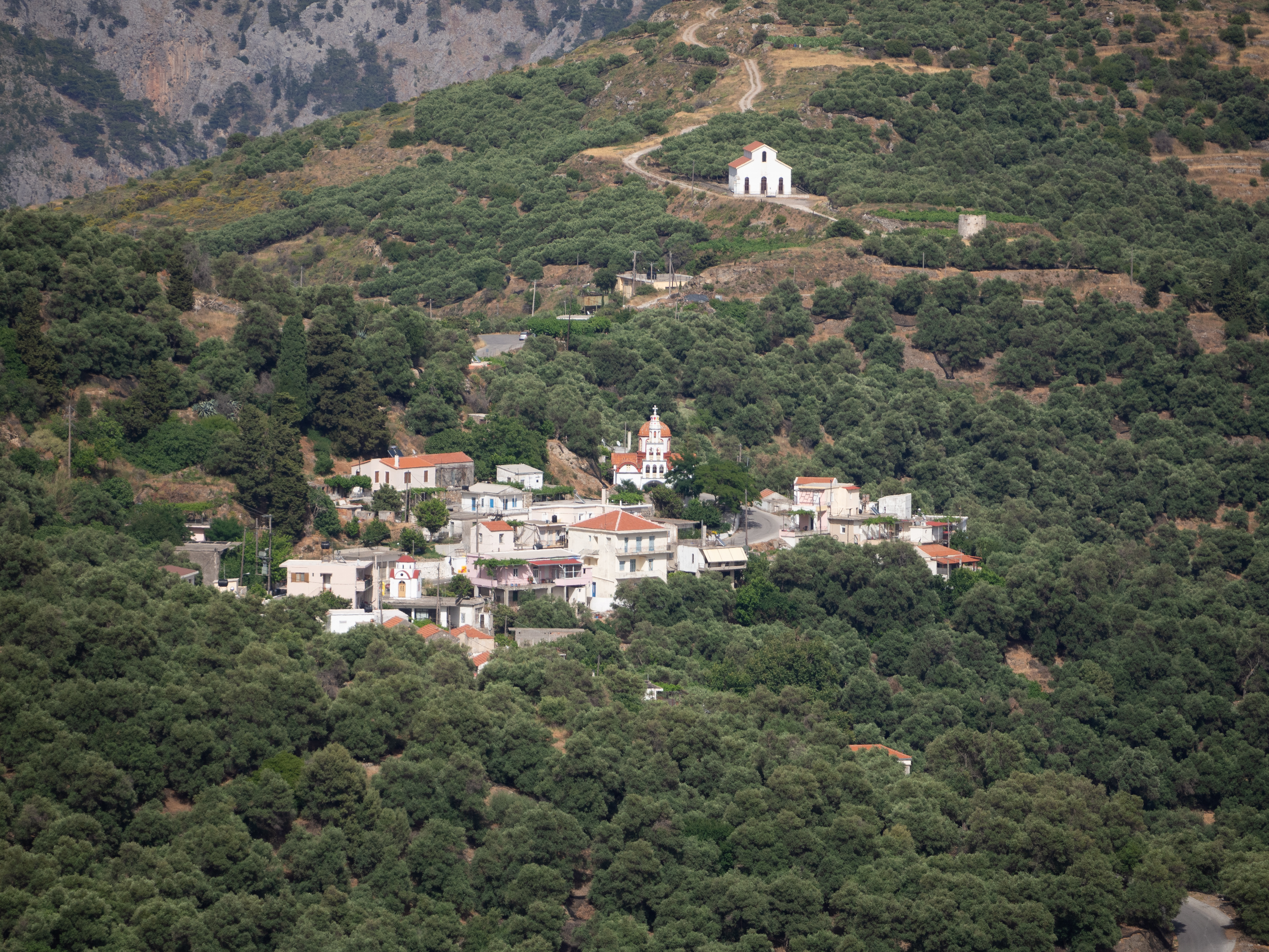
- View of Rodovani, Crete, from the west.

- Location within Greece
- Coordinates: 35°17′20″N 23°46′52″E
- Country: Greece
- Administrative region: Crete
- Regional unit: Chania
- Municipality: Kantanos-Selino
- Municipal unit: East Selino

Population (2021)
  - Community: 189
- Time zone: UTC+2 (EET)
  - Summer (DST): UTC+3 (EEST)

Rodovani (Greek: Ροδοβάνι) is a community and a small village in Chania regional unit on the island of Crete, Greece. It is part of the municipal unit of East Selino (Anatoliko Selino). The community consists of the following villages (population in 2021):

- Rodovani, pop. 68
- Agriles, pop. 17
- Kamaria, pop. 22
- Livada, pop. 30
- Maza, pop. 52

Near Rodovani is located the ancient city of Elyros.
