= Gavdopoula =

Greek islet in the Libyan Sea

Native name: Γαυδοπούλα
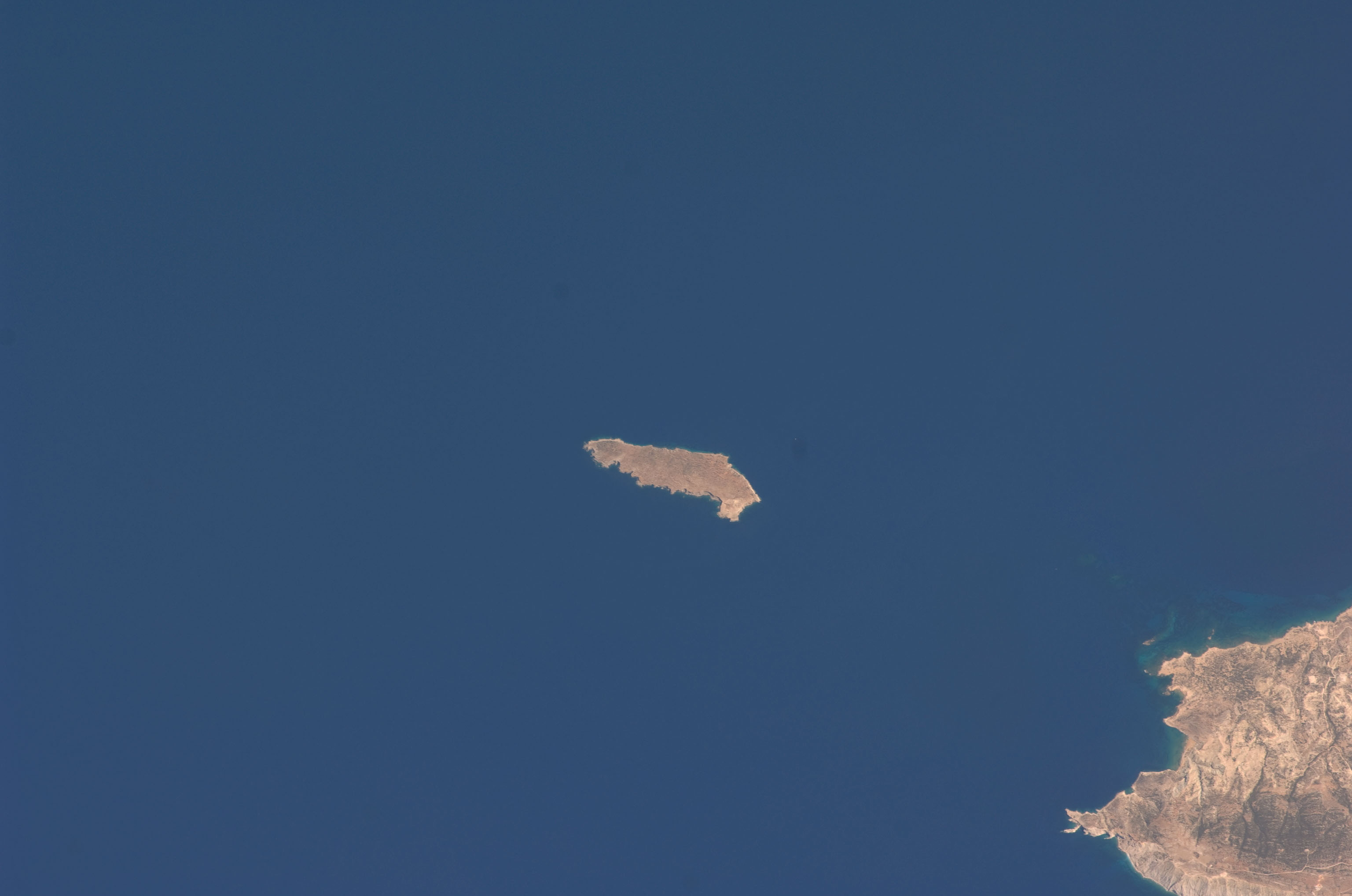
- The islet of Gavdopoula

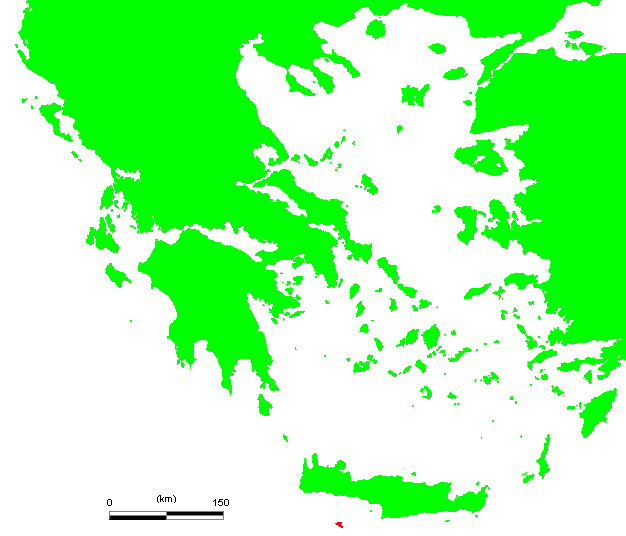

Geography
- Coordinates: 34°53′N 24°01′E
- Archipelago: Cretan Islands
- Area: 2 km^{2} (0.77 sq mi)

Administration
- Greece
- Region: Crete
- Regional unit: Chania

Demographics
- Population: 0 (2021)

Additional information
- Vehicle registration: ΧΝ

Gavdopoula (Greek: Γαυδοπούλα [ɣavðoˈpula]) is a Greek islet in the Libyan Sea, north-west of its larger neighbour Gavdos and to the south of Crete. It is part of the municipality of Gavdos in the regional unit of Chania, Crete, and was part of the former Selino Province.

== Nature ==
Gavdopoula is covered with phrygana (φρύγανα) low-lying shrubs. It is an important stop for migrating birds.

=== Important Bird Area ===
Both Gavdos and Gavdopoula have been designated by BirdLife International as an Important Bird Area (IBA) because they support resident populations of European shags and Eurasian scops owls as well as passage migrants.

== Proposed container shipping development ==
In 1998 the islet was the proposed site of an enormous container shipping storage facility. Environmentalists campaigned successfully to block the development and Gavdopoula is now a protected nature reserve and notably for migrating birds.

== See also ==
- List of communities of Chania
- List of islands of Greece
