= Argastiri =

Village on the island of Crete, Greece

Coordinates: 35°20′N 23°48′E

Argastiri (Greek Αργαστήρι) is a small village in Chania regional unit on the island of Crete, Greece. It has 12 residents (2021 census), its elevation is 650 meters above sea level and it lies 48 km south of Chania. It is within the municipality of Kantanos-Selino. A battle took place in Argastiri during the Greek War of Independence against the Turks. 450 Greeks under Nikiforos Hatzidakis lost the battle by 2000 Turks under Kaouris, the aga of Kantanos. Nikiforos Hatzidakis was killed.
