= Kokkinogeia =

Village in Laconia, Greece

Coordinates: 36.404°N 22.487°E

Kokkinogeia (Greek: Κοκκινόγεια) is a village in the municipality of East Mani, Laconia, Greece. It is the southernmost village in mainland Greece. It is part of the local community of Lagia. Its population was 9 at the 2011 census.
