= Vatsiana =

Coordinates: 34°49′16″N 24°05′56″E

Vatsiana (Greek: Βατσιανά), on the island of Gavdos in the Chania regional unit of Crete in Greece, is the most southernly settlement in Europe. As of 2021, the village's permanent population was 15; though, in the summer, the number of people on the island increases to a few thousand due to tourism.

Vatsiana (Greece)
