= Agia Eirini (island) =

Greek islet in the Libyan Sea

Native name: Αγία Ειρήνη
- Location within Greece

Geography
- Coordinates: 35.0347°N 25.9742°E
- Archipelago: Cretan Islands

Administration
- Greece
- Region: Crete
- Regional unit: Lasithi

Demographics
- Population: 0 (2001)

Agia Eirini (Greek: Αγία Ειρήνη, "Saint Irene"), is an uninhabited Greek islet near the port of Makry Gialos, in the Libyan Sea, close to the southern coast of eastern Crete. Administratively it lies within the Makry Gialos municipal unit of Lasithi.

== See also ==
- List of islands of Greece
