= Agia Eirini Gorge =

Gorge in Crete, Greece

Coordinates: 35.2995°N 23.8346°E

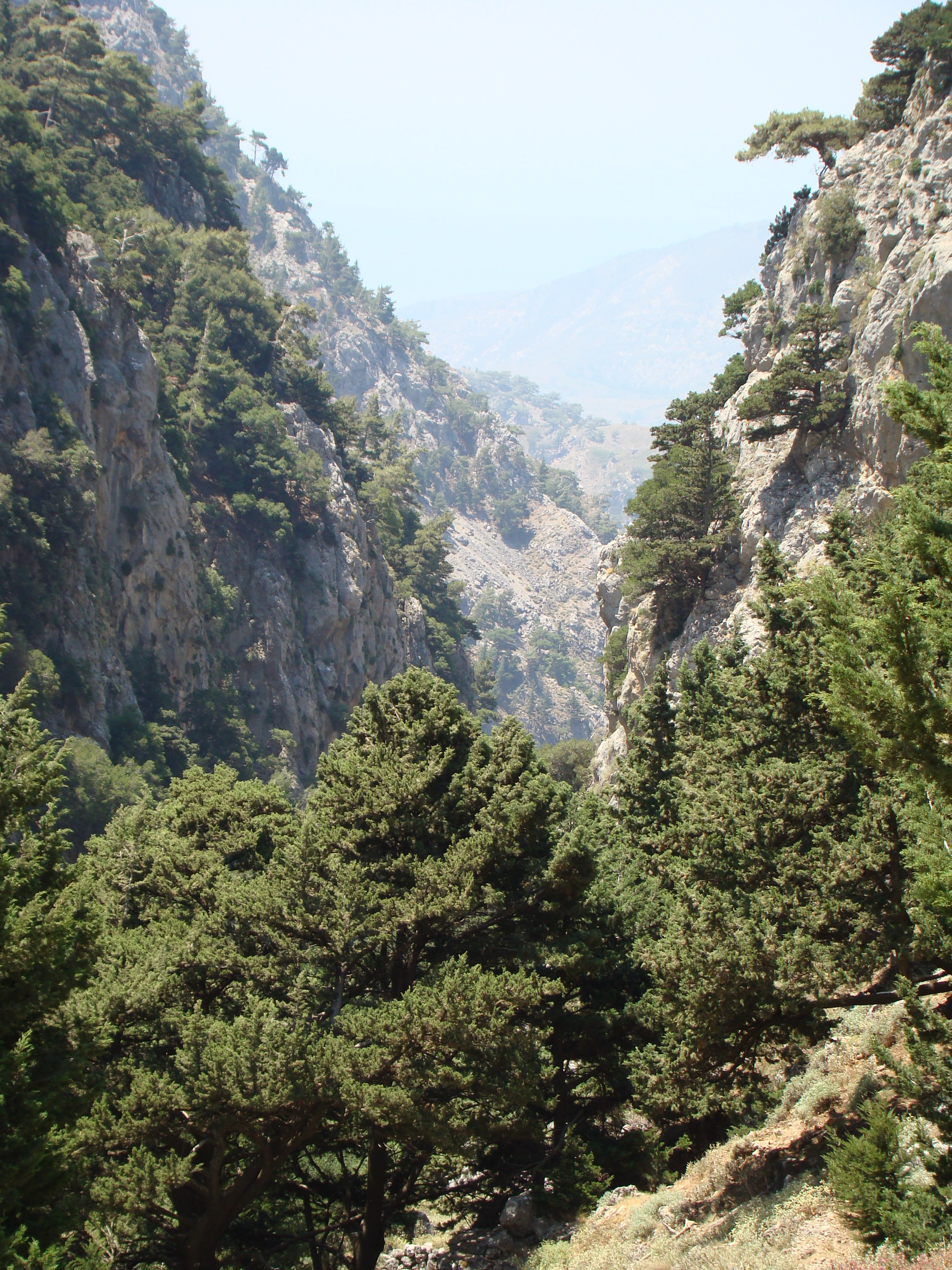
Agia Eirini Gorge

Agia Eirini Gorge (Greek Φαράγγι Αγίας Ειρήνης), sometimes called St. Irene Gorge, is located in the south-west of the island of Crete, Greece, in Lefka Ori. The gorge starts near the village of Agia Eirini and it ends near the village of Sougia, on the south coast. It is 7.5 kilometres (4.7 mi) long and 45–500 metres (148–1,640 ft) deep, in a forested area with steep mountain cliffs. In 1866, 1,000 women and children escaped from the Ottomans through this gorge.
