= Selino =

Human settlement of Crete

Selino Province Επαρχία Σελίνου
- Province of Greece
- 2006
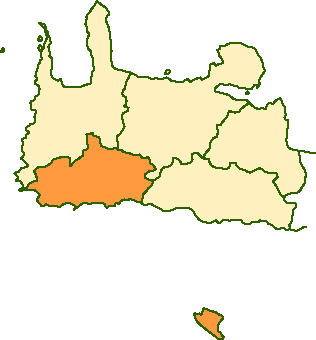

Selino is a historical region and a former province of Crete. It is located in the remote southwestern corner of the island, in the Chania regional unit. It is a rugged and remote area in the foothills of the Lefka Ori (White Mountains) and also includes Gavdos, an island to the south of Crete considered the southernmost point in Europe. Selino's capital is Palaiochora. Sougia is a small but growing resort. The region's name derives from the Venetian castle at Palaiochora, 'Kastello Selino'.

The territory of the province corresponded with that of the current municipalities Kantanos-Selino and Gavdos. It was abolished in 2006.

== Islands ==
- Gavdopoula (populated)
- Gavdos (populated)
