= Palaiochora =

Town in Crete, Greece

Palaiochora Παλαιόχωρα
- Community
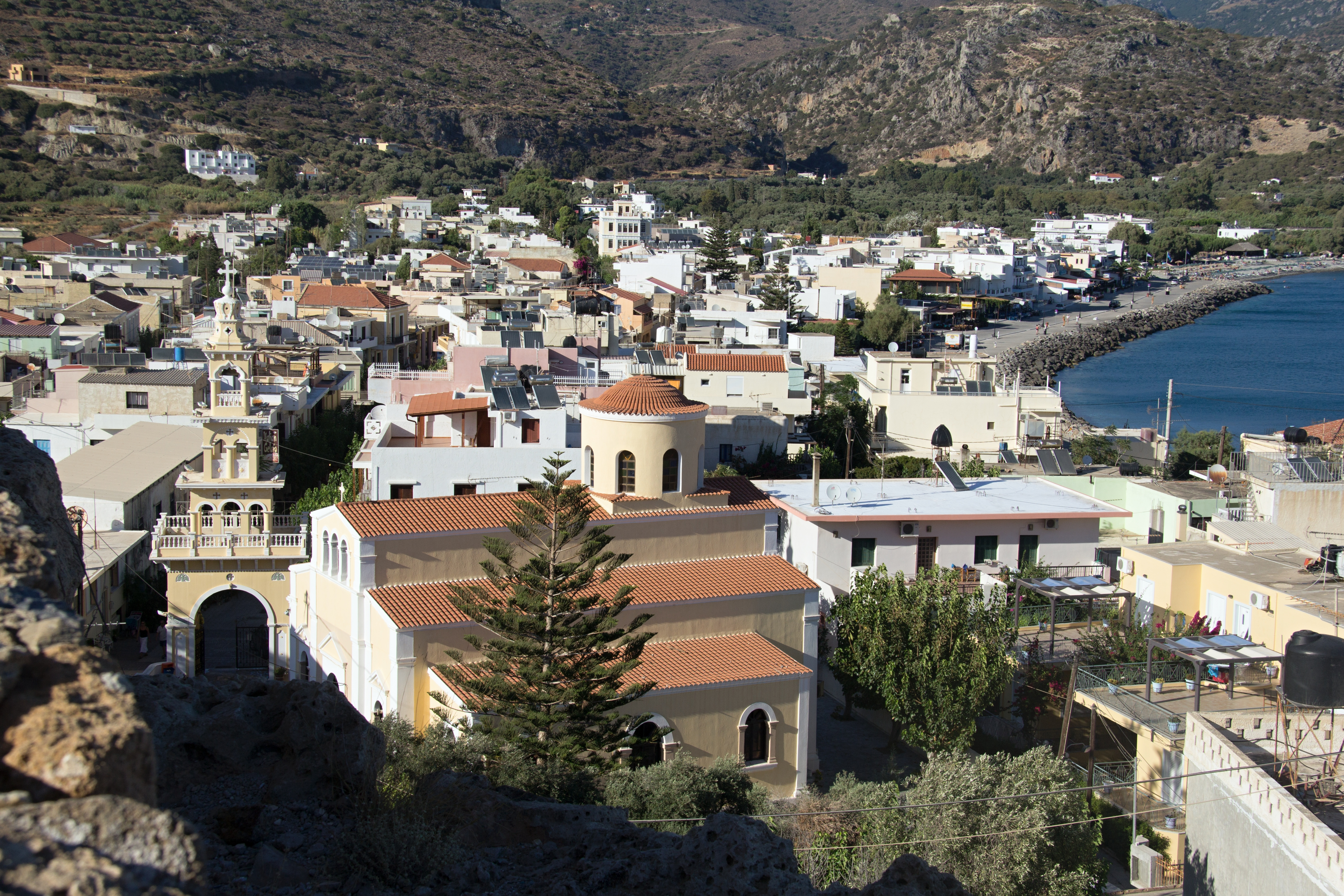
- Town of Palaiochora

- Location within Greece
- Coordinates: 35°15′N 23°45′E
- Country: Greece
- Administrative region: Crete
- Regional unit: Chania
- Municipality: Kantanos-Selino
- Municipal unit: Pelekanos
- Elevation: 56 m (184 ft)

Population (2021)
  - Community: 2,181
- Time zone: UTC+2 (EET)
  - Summer (DST): UTC+3 (EEST)
- Postal code: 730 01
- Area code: 28230
- Vehicle registration: ΧΝ

Palaiochora (Greek: Παλαιόχωρα or Παλιόχωρα) is a small town in Chania regional unit, Greece. It is located 70 km south of Chania, on the southwest coast of Crete and occupies a small peninsula 400 m wide and 700 m long. The town is set along 11 km of coastline bordering the Libyan Sea. It is the seat of the municipality of Kantanos–Selino and its population was 2,181 in the 2021 census.

== Economy ==
Palaiochora's economy is based on tourism and agriculture (mainly the cultivation of tomatoes in greenhouses, and also olive oil production). It has been a holiday destination since the early 1970s when it was popular with hippies.

Palaiochora has crystal clear waters, well organised beaches, and isolated small anchorages. It is served by numerous hotels, restaurants, tavernas, cafés, and bars. Facilities in Palaiochora include bank branches, a post office, a central telephone office, a health centre, doctor's offices, dentists, chemists, a police station, a coast guard and customs office, and many types of stores. Ferry boats connect Palaiochora with Sougia, Agia Roumeli, Loutro, Chora Sfakion, and Gavdos.

Local attractions include the abundant wild flowers in the spring, the opportunity to see Venetian and Byzantine frescoes in some of the local churches (including in Anidri and Voutas), and a museum dedicated to the Acretans in the town itself. The nearby village of Azogires, 5 km away, has a museum dedicated to the area as well as the now uninhabited Monastery of the 99 Holy Fathers and what is said to be the largest evergreen plane tree on the island. In 2009, a plan was announced to open a number of signposted walking routes in the area. The town is on the European E4 walking trail.

Palaiochora stands on the ruins of the ancient city of Kalamydi.

== History ==
In 1278, the Venetian general Marino Gradenigo built a fort in the Palechora area, called the "Selino Kasteli". The fort gave its name to the whole province, previously known as 'Orina', which was then renamed 'Selino'. The fort was destroyed in 1332 and rebuilt in 1334. Near the fort, the Venetians established a new settlement for workers and merchants called Vourgos. The general Hayreddin Barbarossa destroyed the fort in 1539, but it was refurbished in 1595 by Dolf. In 1645, the Turks conquered the town and modified the fort to suit their needs.

In 1834 an English traveler named Robert Pashley found the fort completely destroyed and the whole area uninhabited. Only a granary and one or two small buildings remained. In 1866 the resettlement of Paleochora began.

In December 1866, during the Cretan uprising against the Ottoman Turks, the British gunboat HMS Assurance evacuated some 340 women and children from Paleochora, then known as Selino Castelli (or Selino Kastelli), and took them to Piraeus for safety. This caused a major international incident since the Ottoman authorities accused the British of siding with the Cretan rebels. Russian gunboats followed suit, evacuating refugees from Loutro and Sougia, east of Paleochora.

During the Battle of Crete during World War II, the town was the scene of fighting between motorcycle-riding troops of the German 95th Reconnaissance Battalion and the Eighth Greek Regiment (Provisional) with elements of the Cretan Gendarmerie. The Germans built a number of gun emplacements by the Venetian Fortezza, and their remains are still visible.

The general trend of urbanization that began in other parts of Greece in the 1960s had already started in the previous decade on the nearby island of Gavdos. During that period the islanders exchanged their land on Gavdos for former Turkish holdings on Crete, which had now become exchangeable through a state program. They created a community known as 'Gavdiotika', in the 'old town' section of Paleochora.

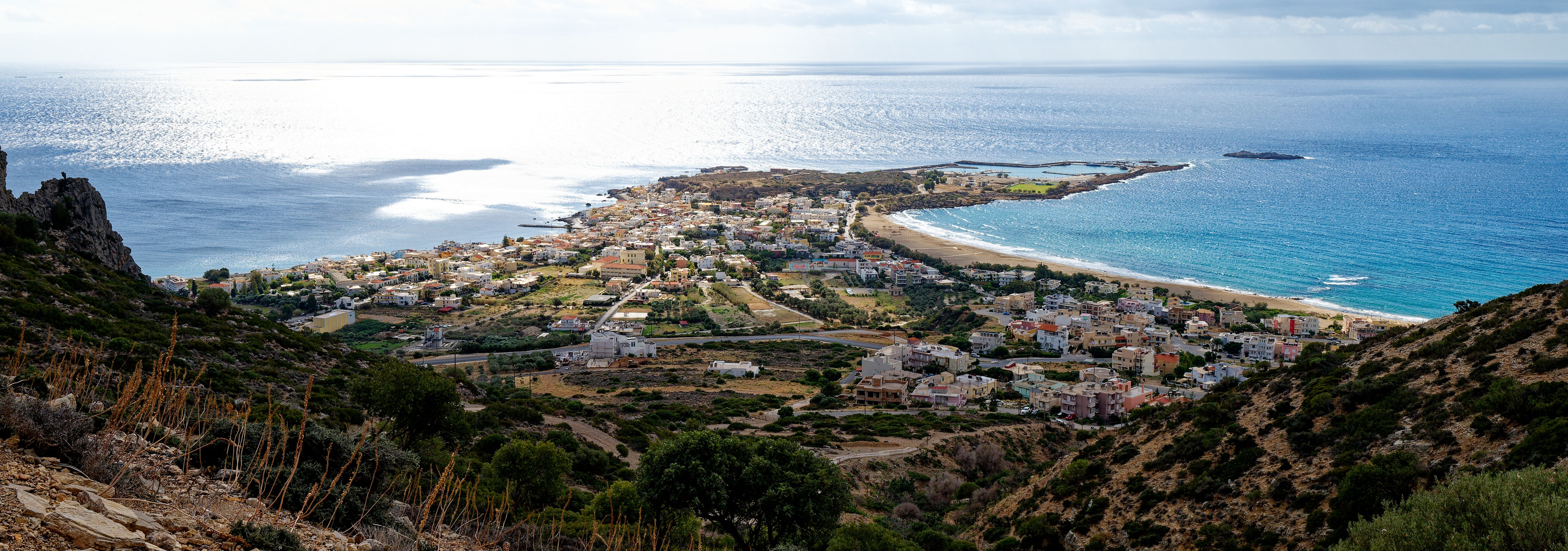
Panoramic view of Palaiochora from the antenna hill
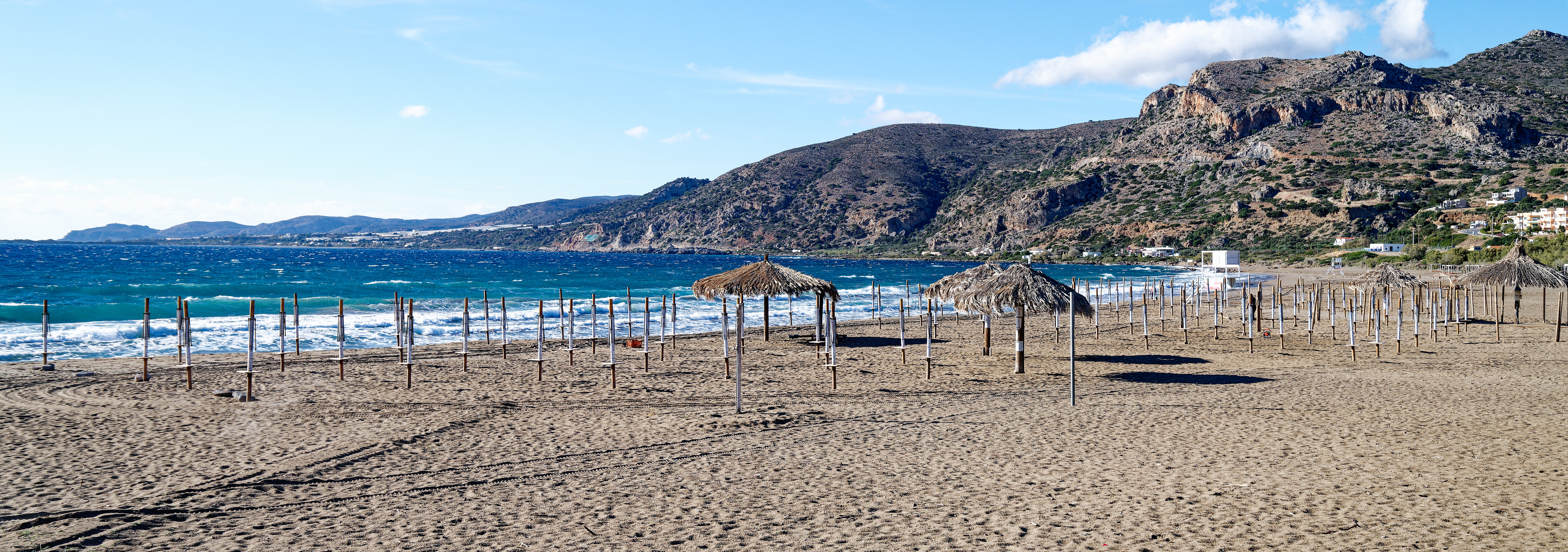
Western beach of Palaiochora

== Climate ==
Palaiochora has a hot-summer Mediterranean climate (Csa in the Köppen climate classification). It has hot dry summers and very mild winters. Palaiochora falls in 11a plant hardiness zone. On June 27, 2007 Palaiochora recorded an astonishing minimum temperature of 35.8 °C. Furthermore on the night between 25 and 26 of June 2007 the temperature did not drop below 38.0 °C.

Climate data for Palaiochora 5 m a.s.l. (2006–2024)
| Month | Jan | Feb | Mar | Apr | May | Jun | Jul | Aug | Sep | Oct | Nov | Dec | Year |
|---|---|---|---|---|---|---|---|---|---|---|---|---|---|
| Record high °C (°F) | 22.5 (72.5) | 22.9 (73.2) | 25.9 (78.6) | 30.6 (87.1) | 36.9 (98.4) | 45.0 (113.0) | 44.9 (112.8) | 44.1 (111.4) | 39.8 (103.6) | 33.9 (93.0) | 29.9 (85.8) | 23.3 (73.9) | 45.0 (113.0) |
| Mean daily maximum °C (°F) | 16.1 (61.0) | 16.3 (61.3) | 18.0 (64.4) | 20.7 (69.3) | 24.7 (76.5) | 29.8 (85.6) | 33.1 (91.6) | 32.9 (91.2) | 29.4 (84.9) | 25.0 (77.0) | 21.5 (70.7) | 17.9 (64.2) | 23.8 (74.8) |
| Daily mean °C (°F) | 13.4 (56.1) | 13.6 (56.5) | 15.0 (59.0) | 17.6 (63.7) | 21.4 (70.5) | 26.2 (79.2) | 29.6 (85.3) | 29.6 (85.3) | 26.3 (79.3) | 22.1 (71.8) | 18.7 (65.7) | 15.3 (59.5) | 20.7 (69.3) |
| Mean daily minimum °C (°F) | 10.7 (51.3) | 10.9 (51.6) | 12.0 (53.6) | 14.4 (57.9) | 18.0 (64.4) | 22.6 (72.7) | 26.0 (78.8) | 26.3 (79.3) | 23.1 (73.6) | 19.1 (66.4) | 15.9 (60.6) | 12.6 (54.7) | 17.6 (63.7) |
| Record low °C (°F) | 2.8 (37.0) | 1.2 (34.2) | 4.1 (39.4) | 7.9 (46.2) | 12.3 (54.1) | 14.6 (58.3) | 19.7 (67.5) | 20.9 (69.6) | 16.6 (61.9) | 13.2 (55.8) | 7.0 (44.6) | 3.3 (37.9) | 1.2 (34.2) |
| Average rainfall mm (inches) | 104.5 (4.11) | 90.6 (3.57) | 47.9 (1.89) | 19.9 (0.78) | 15.0 (0.59) | 2.3 (0.09) | 0.2 (0.01) | 2.6 (0.10) | 17.8 (0.70) | 38.9 (1.53) | 72.0 (2.83) | 114.0 (4.49) | 525.7 (20.69) |
Source 1: National Observatory of Athens Monthly Bulletins (Oct 2006 – Mar 2024)
Source 2: Palaiochora N.O.A station and World Meteorological Organization
