= Kantanos-Selino =

Kantanos-Selino Κάντανος-Σέλινο
- Municipality
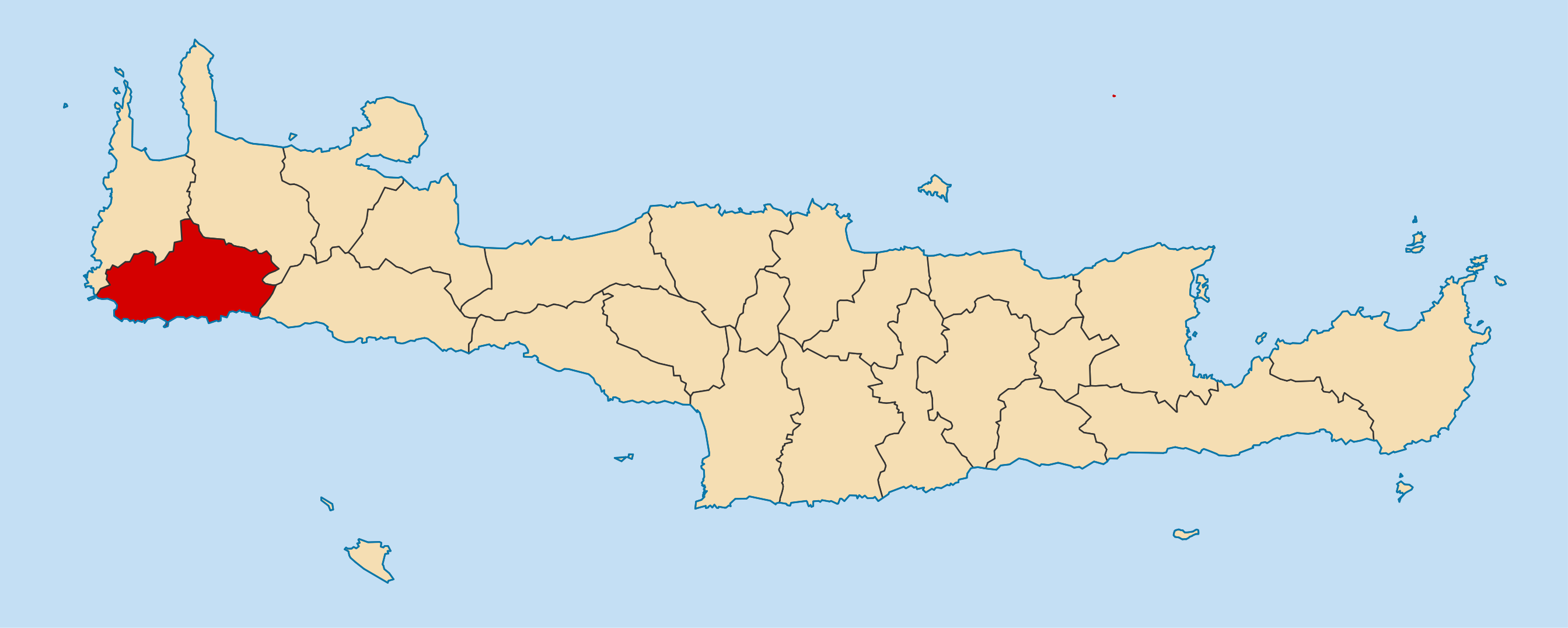

- Location within Greece
- Coordinates: 35°14′N 23°41′E
- Country: Greece
- Administrative region: Crete
- Regional unit: Chania

Area
  - Municipality: 376.3 km^{2} (145.3 sq mi)

Population (2021)
  - Municipality: 5,009
  - Density: 13.31/km^{2} (34.48/sq mi)
- Time zone: UTC+2 (EET)
  - Summer (DST): UTC+3 (EEST)

Municipalities of Chania regional unit. Kantanos-Selino is Number 4

Kantanos-Selino (Greek: Κάντανος-Σέλινο) is a municipality in Chania regional unit, Crete, Greece. It is numbered 4 on the map of the Chania region. The seat of the municipality is the village of Palaiochora. The municipality has an area of 376.254 km^{2} (145.272 sq mi). A significant number of fresco's painted by Ioannis Pagomenos are located in Selino.

== Municipality ==
The municipality Kantanos-Selino was formed at the 2011 local government reform by the merger of the following 3 former municipalities, that became municipal units:

- East Selino
- Kantanos
- Pelekanos

It forms the southwest part of the Chania region and of Crete, and is bordered by Kissamos (5) to the northwest, by Platanias (6) to the north, and by Sfakia (7) to the east.
