= League of the Oreioi =

Ancient Greek political confederation of city-states in western Asia Minor

The League of the Oreioi (Ancient Greek: Koinon tōn Oreiōn, "League of the Highlanders") was an ancient Greek federal state in the mountainous southwest of Crete. One of the few genuine federal polities in pre-Roman Crete, it is distinguished from the looser island-wide Cretan Koinon by its joint citizenship, federal coinage, and common sanctuary.

== Members ==
The league's membership has been reconstructed from limited evidence: coinage, the Magas treaty, and Polybius. Its core members appear to have been Elyrus, Hyrtacina, Tarrha, and Lissus, with the harbour towns of Syia and Poecilasium serving as outports; Cantanus is a probable further member. The federal coinage, a wild goat's head with arrowhead on the obverse, a bee on the reverse, was first identified as an alliance type by Svoronos (1888). Of the league's major cities, only Lissus, the findspot of the treaty stele and seat of the federal sanctuary, lay at sea level.

== Foundation ==
The federation's territory was known as the Oreia; however, the koinon may have taken its name from the traditional geographic name of the area. The League is generally dated to the late fourth century BC. The earliest secure evidence is coinage bearing the legend ΟΡ[ΕΙΩΝ] and a treaty with Magas of Cyrene (c. 280–260 BC) documented on a stele found at Lissus (IC II.xvii.1). A funerary epigram (IG v/1.723) from Sparta records the fatherland of the deceased as the Oreioi; he may have died at the Battle of Corinth (265 BC) alongside King Areus of Sparta.

== External relations ==
Beyond the Magas treaty, Polyrrhenia sought and attained alliance with the League at its height. Around 220 BC the Oreioi abandoned the Gortynian-Knossian alliance and joined Lyktos in the Lyttian War (221–219 BC). The terminus ante quem of the league's dissolution is 183 BC. In that year, a pan-Cretan treaty with Eumenes II of Pergamon lists former member cities, Elyrians, Hyrtakinians, and Tarrhaians, individually among some thirty Cretan signatories, rather than under the Oreioi ethnic, indicating the federation was no longer acting as a unit. The union is estimated to have lasted approximately one hundred years.

== Constitution ==
The League of the Oreioi was a sympolity with joint citizenship, a common territory, and the right to conclude alliances and mint federal coins. The federal sanctuary was the shrine of Diktynna at Lissus, where the Magas treaty was displayed; the oath invokes Diktynna, Zeus Kretagenes, and unspecified gods of Poikilasion (τὸς ἐμ Ποικιλασίωι θεὸς). No federal magistrates, assembly, or council are attested. Member cities retained autonomy: separate theōrodokoi are listed for Elyros, Lisos, and Tarrha in the Delphic records, and Hyrtakina and Lisos continued minting with their own ethnics alongside the federal type.
