= Syia =

Maritime town of ancient Crete

Coordinates: 35°14′59″N 23°48′20″E

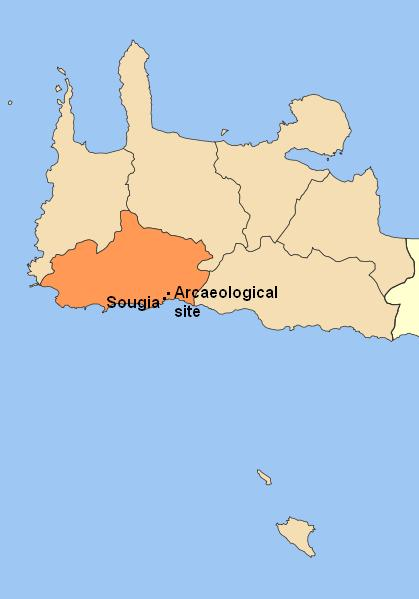
Location of the archaeological site of Syia.

Syia or Suia (Ancient Greek: Συΐα), also Syba (Σύβα), was a maritime town of ancient Crete. It was located on the south coast of Crete and functioned as the harbour of Elyrus. According to the Stadiasmus Maris Magni, written during Roman times, the town was located 50 stadia to the west of Poecilassus, situated on a plain. It probably existed as late as the time of Hierocles (6th century), though now entirely uninhabited.

It is located in Sougia village, 70 km south of Chania.

== Archaeology ==
Robert Pashley, visiting in the 19th century, found remains of the city walls as well as other public buildings, but not more ancient than the time of the Roman Empire. Several tombs were found, as was an aqueduct.

Syia flourished in the Roman and the 1st Byzantine period. There are Roman ruins and three large Palaiochristian Basilicas. Syia had set up monetary union with Yrtakina, Elyrus, Lissus, and Tarrha. The city also participated in the Koinon of the Oreioi. It seems that the Saracens destroyed the city.
