= Lissus (Crete) =

Former town

Coordinates: 35°14′37″N 23°47′08″E

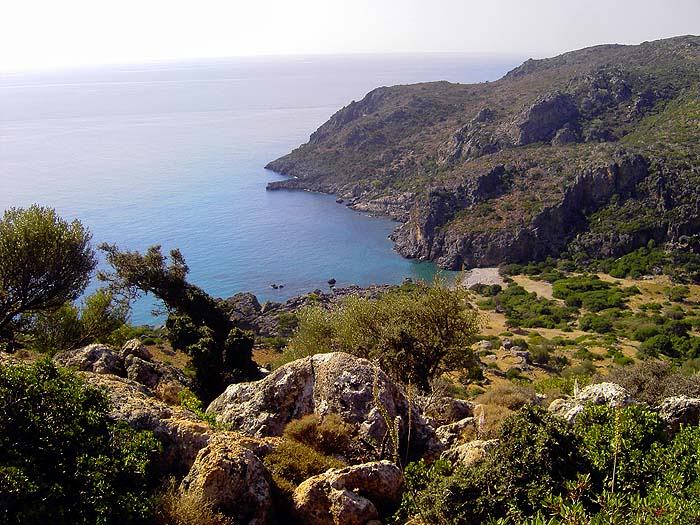
Lissos as seen from the east

Lissus or Lissos (Ancient Greek: Λίσσος) was a town on the south coast of ancient Crete, which the anonymous Stadiasmus Maris Magni places between Syia and Calamyde. The Peutinger Table gives 16 M.P. as the distance between Cantanum and Lissus (there recorded as Liso). It was one of the harbours (the other was Syia) of Elyrus. It was established in the Classical period and flourished until the Late Antiquity. Its name was made certain by inscriptions. The early history of the city is unknown. Based on inscriptions and coins of the 3rd century BCE, we know the city allied with King Magas of Cyrene, and joined the League of the Oreioi. The league's core members appear to have been Elyrus, Hyrtacina, Tarrha, and Lissus, with the harbour towns of Syia and Poecilasium serving as outports; Cantanus is a probable further member. Lissus had powerful trading and fishing fleets.

This Cretan city was an episcopal see in the time of Hierocles. The order in which Flaminius Cornelius mentions it with the other bishoprics in the west part of the island agrees very well with its actual location in Agios Kirikos area, near the small village of Sougia, 70 km south of Chania.

Of all the towns which existed on this part of the coast, Lissus alone seems to have struck coins, a fact which agrees very well with the evidence supplied by its situation, of its having been a place of some trading importance. The harbour is mentioned in the Periplus of Pseudo-Scylax, and the types of the coins are either maritime, or indicative of the worship of Dictynna, as might have been expected on this part of the island. The obverse of one coin bears the impress of the caps and stars of the Dioscuri, and its reverse a quiver and arrow. On the second coin the caps and stars are replaced by a dolphin, and instead of the quiver a female head, probably that of Artemis or Dictynna. Lissus and Yrtakina were allies, and they had trading intercourse with common currency. Their coins had a dolphin or flying dove on the one side, and eight-ray star with the word L/I/S/I/O/N (of the Lisians) on the other.

== Situation and archaeology ==
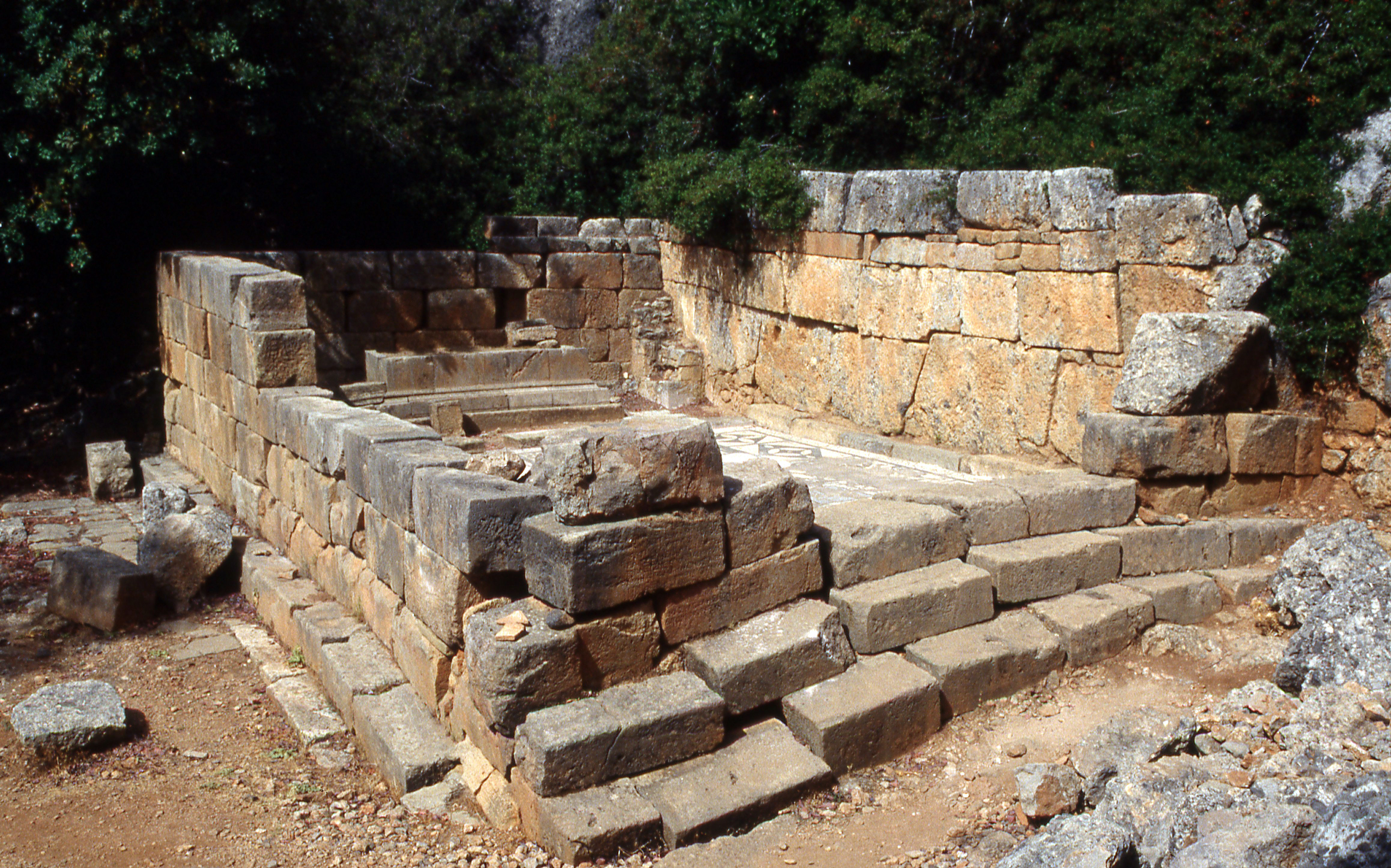
The Temple of Asklepios in 1992

This place occupies a small hollow of the hills facing the sea, like a theatre. Near the church of the Panaghia are what appear to be vestiges of an ancient temple, consisting of granite columns, and white marble fragments, architraves, and pediments. Further on, appears to have been another temple, and a theatre. The tombs with arched rooves, are on the southwest side of the plain on the cliffside overlooking the site. There are perhaps fifty of them.

In 1957–58 the city was excavated by N. Platon and archaeologists. They discovered ruins of a theatre, aqueduct, a cemetery, ancient baths, and Palaeo-Christian basilicas. In the area, they also found many statues and votive objects, which are now exhibited at the new Archaeological Museum of Chania (reopened in 2022). An ancient theatre, or Odeon, was uncovered at the site of Lissos in 2023, one of the great archaeological discoveries of that year.

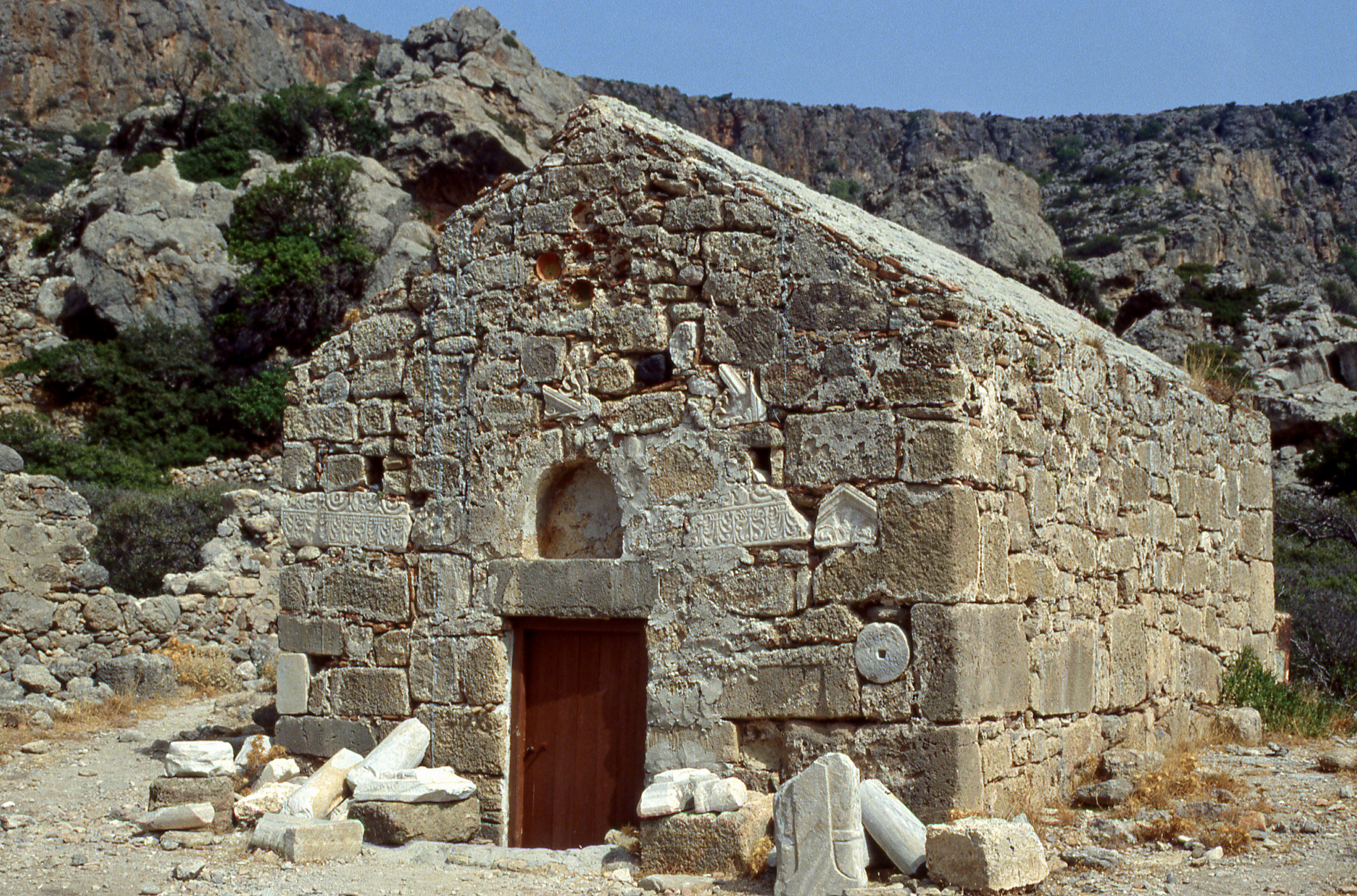
The chapel of the Panagia, incorporating ancient spolia

In no other city of Crete, apart from Gortys, were so many pieces of sculpture found. This fact testifies to the prosperity and the power of the Asclepieum of Lissus. Beside the Asclepieum and the Roman necropolis there are also two Greek Orthodox churches: Agios Kyrikos has some nice frescoes, and the chapel of Panagia is built with ancient marble blocks.

The small beach is a coarse pebble beach. Nobody lives in Lissos nowadays. It is reachable from Sougia by boat or by foot (90 minute walk through the Lissos Gorge).

== See also ==
- List of ancient Greek cities
