= Philander (mythology) =

In Greek mythology, Philander or Philandros (Ancient Greek: Φίλανδρος, meaning 'loving men') was the son of the nymph Acacallis and Apollo, and the brother of Phylacides. Their mother mated with the god in the house of Carmanor in the city of Tarrha. According to the Elyrians, Phylacides and Philander were suckled by a goat.
