= Carmanor =

In Greek mythology, Carmanor or Karmanor (Ancient Greek: Καρμάνωρ) may refer to the following personages:

- Carmanor, a Cretan priest and who purified Apollo after he killed Python
- Carmanor, son of Dionysus and Alexirrhoe.
