= Caeno =

Town of ancient Crete

Caeno or Kaino (Ancient Greek: Καινώ) was a town of ancient Crete, which, according to the legend of the purification of Apollo by Carmanor at Tarrha, is supposed to have existed in the neighbourhood of that place and Elyrus. According to mythology, the Cretan goddess Britomartis was the daughter of Zeus and Carma, granddaughter of Carmanor, and was said to have been born at Caeno.

The site of Caeno is unlocated.
