= Kalamydi =

Archaeological site on Crete

Coordinates: 35°14′30″N 23°41′35″E

Kalamydi (Ancient Greek: Καλαμύδη) is an ancient Dorian city on the south coast of Western Crete. It was first tentatively identified in 1837 by Robert Pashley in the second volume of his book Travels in Crete. It is located near Palaiochora in Chania regional unit, near the estuary of the Kakodikianos river. The remains of Kalamyde are to the west of Lissus and thirty stade from Kriu-metopon.

There are ruins of a Roman house at Trochaloi.

== Seismological history ==
Archaeoseismological studies have shown evidence of past tsunamis and earthquakes that occurred in Kalamyde as well as throughout western Crete. It is believed that Kalamyde was located to the northeast of the contemporary town of Palaiochora and served as the harbor site for the city of Kanatos. Kalamyde would have been severely affected by the 365 AD Crete earthquake that destroyed nearly every town in Crete; the southwestern Cretan coast was lifted up to 9 metres (30 ft) by the earthquake.

== Site description ==
On the west and southwest sides of the city the walls may be traced for 300 or 400 paces; on the east they extend about 100 paces; while on the south the ridge narrows, and the wall, adapting itself to the natural features of the hill, has not a length of more than 20 paces. This wall is composed of polygonal stones, which have not been touched by the chisel.
