= Lappa =

Lappa may refer to:

- Lappa, Queensland, a village in the Shire of Mareeba, North Queensland, Australia, also known as Lappa Lappa and Lappa Junction
- Lappa, Rethymno, a municipal unit in the Rethymno regional unit, Greece
- Lappa (Crete), an ancient town of Crete, Greece
- Lappa (see), a bishopric based at the ancient town in Crete
- A plant, Arctium lappa, also called greater burdock
- Lappa, a garment worn by men and women in Africa

== See also ==
- Lappas, a village in the municipal unit Larissos, in Achaea, Greece
