= Phylacides =

In Greek mythology, Phylacides or Phylakides (Ancient Greek: Φυλακίδῃ means 'son of Phylacus') was the son of the nymph Acacallis and Apollo, and the brother of Philander. Their mother mated with the god in the house of Carmanor in the city of Tarrha. According to the Elyrians, Phylacides and Philander were suckled by a goat.
