= Küçük Hasan Pasha Mosque =

Former mosque, now exhibition hall in Chania, Crete, Greece

- Γιαλί Τζαμί
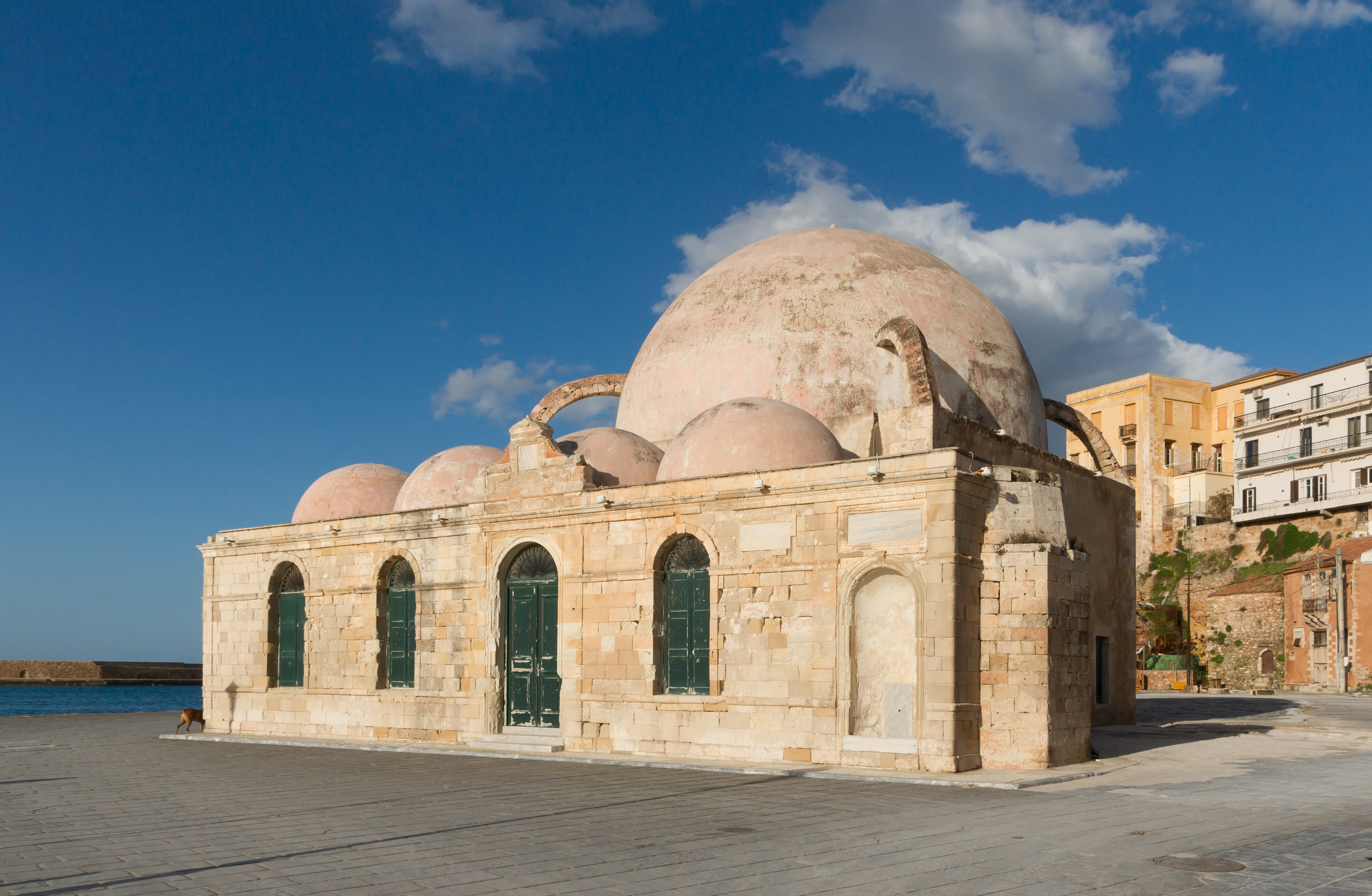

- Location of the former mosque in Crete

Religion
- Affiliation: Islam (former)
- Ecclesiastical or organizational status: Mosque (1645–1923)
- Status: Abandoned (as a mosque); Repurposed (as an exhibition center)

Location
- Location: Chania, Crete
- Country: Greece
- Interactive map of Küçük Hasan Pasha Mosque
- Coordinates: 35°31′02″N 24°01′04″E

Architecture
- Completed: 1645

Specifications
- Domes: 1 (main); Many (others)
- Minarets: 2? (demolished, 1939)

The Küçük Hasan Pasha Mosque, also known as the Yalı Mosque (Greek: Γιαλί Τζαμί, from Turkish: Yalı Camii, lit. 'Shore Mosque'), is a former mosque located in Chania, on the island of Crete, Greece. Built in 1645 during the Ottoman era, the former mosque was abandoned in 1923, and subsequently repurposed as an exhibition center.

== History ==
The building was originally constructed as a mosque after the conquest of Chania by Ottoman Empire in 1645 to honor Küçük Hasan Pasha. After the Greco-Turkish population exchange in 1923, the mosque ceased to function and in 1939 its minarets were demolished. During World War II, it housed the Archaeological Museum of Chania. Subsequently, it was repurposed as a storehouse, a folklore museum, a visitor center, and an exhibition hall.

== See also ==
- Islam in Greece
- List of former mosques in Greece
- Ottoman Crete
