= Sougia =

Sougia Σούγια
- Community
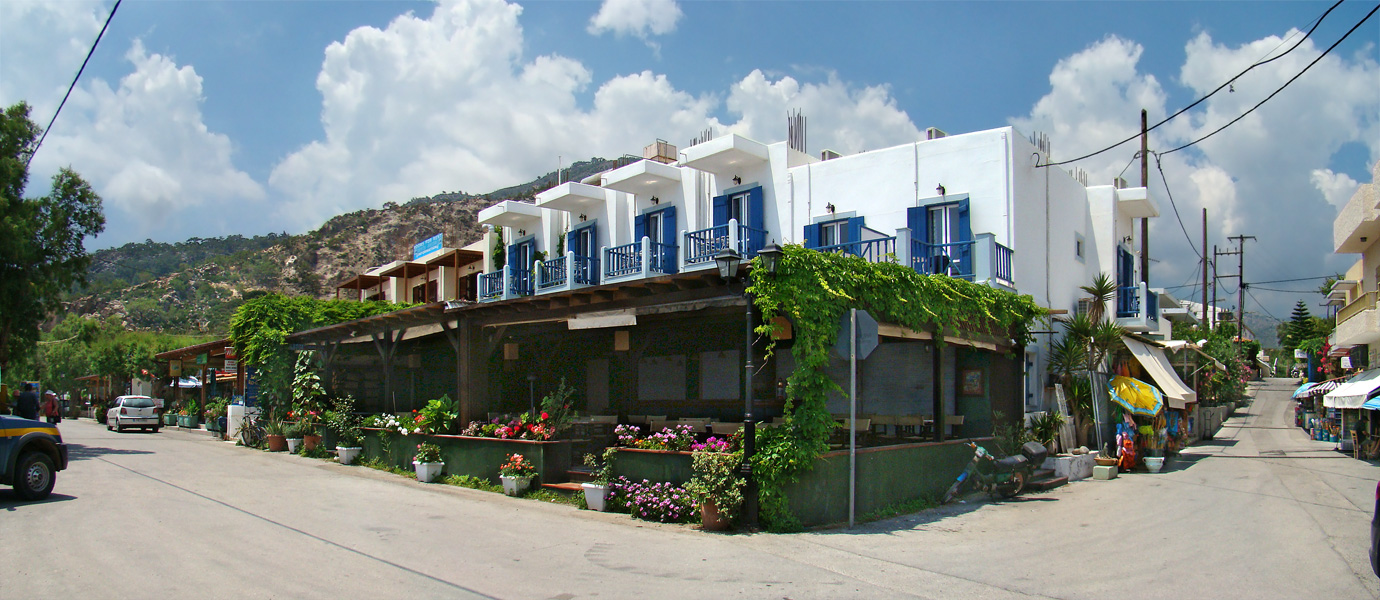
- Sougia main road and sea front

- Location within Greece
- Coordinates: 35°15′N 23°49′E
- Country: Greece
- Administrative region: Crete
- Regional unit: Chania
- Municipality: Kantanos-Selino
- Municipal unit: East Selino

Population (2021)
  - Community: 131
- Time zone: UTC+2 (EET)
  - Summer (DST): UTC+3 (EEST)

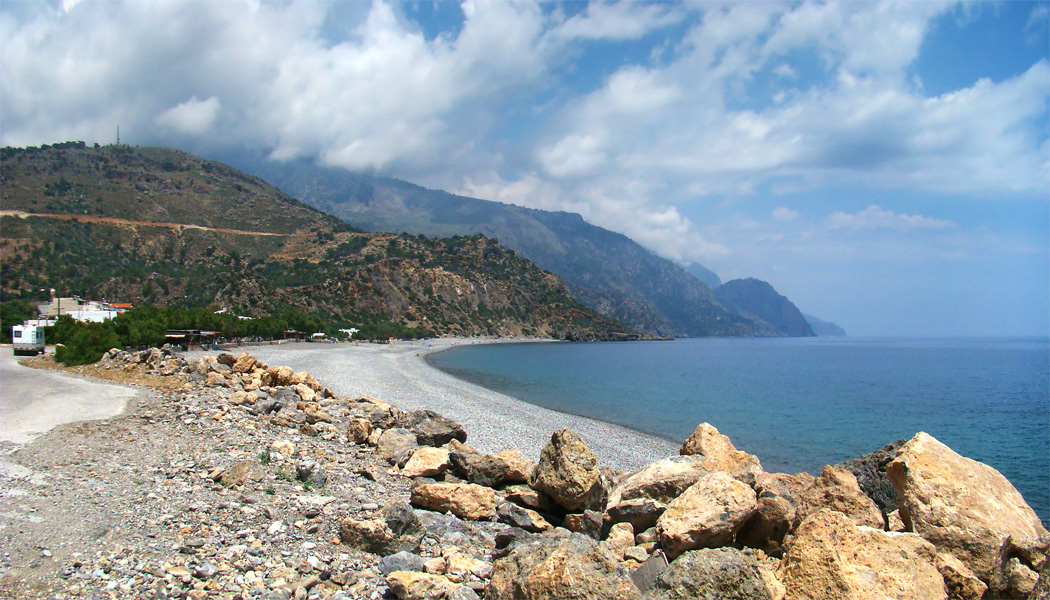
Beach

Sougia (Greek: Σούγια) is a community and a small village in Chania regional unit on the island of Crete, Greece. It is part of the municipal unit of East Selino (Anatoliko Selino). It is located on the south coast of the island, 70 km south of Chania. The community consists of the following villages (population in 2021):

- Sougia, pop. 95
- Koustogerako, pop. 25
- Livadas, pop. 3
- Moni, pop. 8

Sougia is reached from Chania by car in 2 hours or by ferry boats from Palaiochora, Agia Roumeli, Loutro and Hora Sfakion. Although it is not one of the larger towns of the province of Selino, Sougia is interesting to the tourist, providing a beach, walkways, mountains and interesting remains of an ancient city and old Byzantine churches. Sougia has some tourist services, such as small hotels, rooms to rent and a few taverns, cafes and bars. Sougia was the ancient city of Syia, a harbour of Elyros. In the village church, an important basilica of the Byzantine era, was found a beautiful mosaic, now exposed in Chania's Archeological Museum. In 1943, during German occupation, Germans razed the villages Livadas, Moni and Koustogerako, by way of reprisal for local partisan actions. Legends also suggest that the Cyclops in Odysseus' adventure lived in Sougia.

Municipality officer: Nikolas Koltsidis
