= Lissus =

Lissus or Lissos (Greek: Λίσσος) could be:

- Lissus (Crete), an ancient Greek city in Crete
- Lissus (Illyria), an ancient city in Illyria, the present day city of Lezhë in Albania
- Lissus, a river in Thrace
