= Kaino =

Kaino may refer to:

== Geography ==
- Kaino (Crete), a town of ancient Crete
- Kaino-hama Beach, Antarctic beach

== People ==
given name

- Kaino Lempinen (1921 – 2003), Finnish gymnast
- Kaino Thomsen (born 1991), Samoan taekwondo practitioner

surname

- Boaz Kipchumba Kaino, Kenyan politician
- Glenn Kaino (born 1972), American conceptual artist
- Hiroshi Kaino (甲斐野 央, born 1996), Japanese professional baseball player
- Jerome Kaino (born 1983), New Zealand rugby union player

== See also ==
- Kainos
