= Hyrtacina =

Coordinates: 35°16′47″N 23°45′06″E

Hyrtacina or Hyrtakina (Ancient Greek: Ὑρτακίνα), also written as Hyrsacina or Hyrsakina (Ὑρσακίνα), or Artacina or Artakina (Ἀρτάκινα), was a city of ancient Crete, which, little as we learn of its position from Ptolemy and Stephanus of Byzantium, yet we may safely infer from the former's words that it was situated to the southeast of Polyrrhenia, and to the west of Lappa. The Periplus of Pseudo-Scylax teaches us more respecting its site; it places it on the south of the island, and to the south of the Dictynnean temple of Artemis and the Pergamian district. These indications agree well with the situation of the ruins discovered by Robert Pashley on Kastri hill between the existing villages Temenia and Papadiana.

== History ==
Its history is related to the proximate settlement of Lissus, which is also situated in the Agia Eirini Gorge. It has characteristics of other Archaic Period hilltop forts such as Lato, where the founding was based upon achieving a site of safety or refuge.

The city was autonomous; it issued its own coins, one displaying the images of a Cretan wild goat and a bee named Tarra. Another coin depicted a dolphin and an eight-ray star. Elyrus, Lissus, Tarrha, and Hyrtacina had an established monetary union when they joined the Cretan League in the 3rd century BCE. Hyrtacina was one of the Cretan cities that allied with Eumenes II.

== Archaeology ==
The area of the city was in Vlithia Valley towards the sea. In the 19th century, Pashley remarked that numerous vestiges of polygonal masonry on the north and west sides, and measuring little more than half a mile (0.8 km) in length, are still existing. On the other sides the city was precipitous. It is curious to observe the care taken by the inhabitants in defending the gateways of their city. Not only do walls project without the gate, but flanking walls are executed within, forming passages through which the enemy would have to pass before he could set foot within the city. There were two cyclopic walls, parts of which can be seen today. They were integral to a city-castle, where watch and defense soldiers lived with their families. At the acropolis there was found a headless marble statue of Pan; it has legs and feet of a goat, and wears mantle. The statue belongs to the Roman period. In 1939, Theophanidis excavated the Temple of Pan.
