= Koustogerako =

Village in Crete, Greece

Coordinates: 35.279°N 23.835°E

Koustogerako (Greek: Κουστογέρακο) is a small village in Chania regional unit on the island of Crete, Greece. It has 25 residents (2021 census) and it belongs to the municipal unit of East Selino (Anatoliko Selino). The village is built in a wild, beautiful position, at an elevation of 510m. Deep gorges and steep mountain cliffs surround the village. Southwest of the village at a height of 200 m. is the cave of Cyclops, possibly related to the namesake tale found in Homer's Odyssey. Koustogerako has a notable history. It was burned twice by the Venetians for being the birthplace of Kantanoleon (a famous rebel who fought against the Venetians) and once again in 1821 by the Turks. Finally, the Nazis razed Koustogerako, because it was a partizan resistance center against the Germans in World War II. The villagers of Koustogerako gave some of the fiercest and most renowned guerrilla fights, resisting the Nazi occupation. In 1943, the Germans scourged the villages of Moni, Livadas and Koustogerako. They herded about thirty five women and children of Koustogerako lined them up in front of a machine gun. Ten men had climbed the rocks above the village from where they managed to kill eight Nazis soldiers including the machine-gunner, after he had killed five people. The Nazis fled but returned the next day and destroyed the whole village. There is currently a memorial in place, with a big black statue of a partisan. Koustogerako is also a starting point for mountain walks on Lefka Ori.
