= Lucillus Tarrhaeus =

Ancient Greek historian

- Lucillus Tarrhaeus
- Known for: Historian and philosopher

Lucillus Tarrhaeus (alternate name: Lucillus of Tarrha in Crete) was an Ancient Greek writer who lived and worked in Crete.

== Biography ==
He was born and lived in Tarra, Crete, during the 1 century AD.

== Career ==
He has been described as a grammarian, historian and philosopher.

== Bibliography ==
He wrote a work on the city of Thessalonica, a commentary on the Argonautica of Apollonius Rhodius, and a collection of proverbs.

His major well known works are:

- Prouerbia
- Libros Argonauticorum Ap.rhodii
