= Lappa (see) =

Episcopal see

Lappa or Lampa was an episcopal see, suffragan of Gortyn, based on the ancient town of Lappa, now the site of the village of Argyroupoli.

Le Quien (Oriens Christianus, II, 268) mentions the following bishops:

- Petrus, who attended the First Council of Ephesus, 431;
- Deneltius, at the Council of Chalcedon, 451;
- Prosdocius, in 458;
- John, who appealed to Rome against his metropolitan Paul, and attended the Council of Constantinople, 667;
- Epiphanius at the Second Council of Nicaea, 787.

The episcopal see is mentioned in the Notitiae episcopatuum as late as the twelfth and thirteenth centuries.

It was re-established by the Orthodox Church about the end of the nineteenth century; the bishop resides in the monastery of Preveli.

It is also a titular see of the Catholic Church under the name Lappa and previously under the name Lampa.
