= Carmanor (son of Dionysus) =

Son of Dionysus in Greek mythology

In Greek mythology, Carmanor or Karmanor (Ancient Greek: Καρμάνωρ) was the son of Dionysus and Alexirrhoe. He was said to have been killed by a boar during hunt, and the Lydian mountain Tmolus had allegedly been named "Carmanorium" after him before receiving its newer name.
