= Archaeological Museum of Chania =

Coordinates: 35°31′00″N 24°02′13″E

- Αρχαιολογικό Μουσείο Χανίων
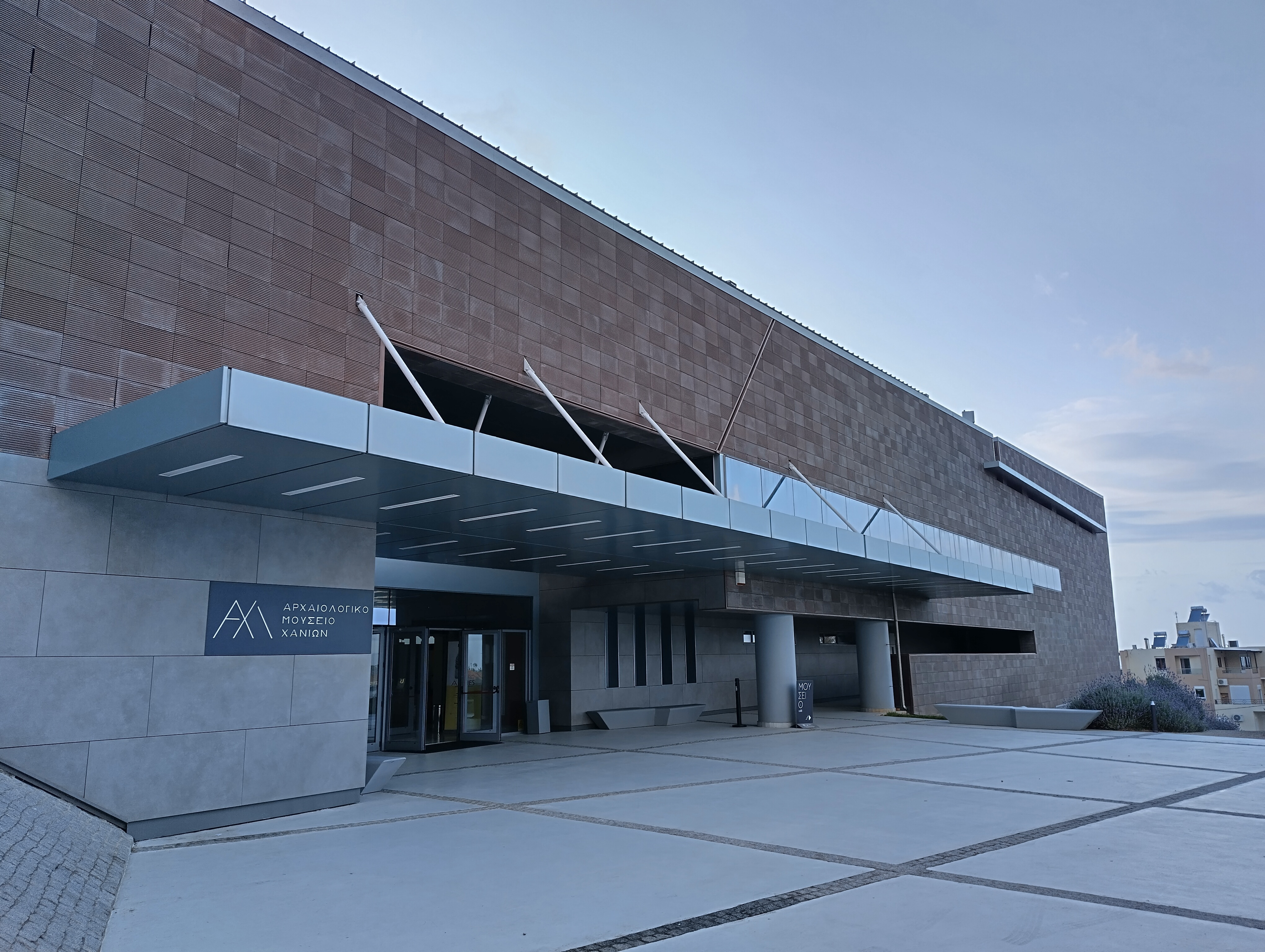
- Established: 1962 (new building in 2022)
- Location: 15 Skra Street, Chania, Greece
- Type: Archaeological museum

The Archaeological Museum of Chania (Greek: Αρχαιολογικό Μουσείο Χανίων) is a archaeology museum serving the Cretean city of Chania that, since 2022, is located at 15 Skra Str. Chalepa.

The original museum was located in the former Venetian Monastery of Saint Francis at Chalidon Street. It was established in 1962 and operated until 2020.

== Building ==
The exact date that the building of the original museum was constructed is unknown although it was mentioned in writing as standing during the great earthquake of 1595 and being the largest in the city. It served as a Venetian church inhabited by Franciscan friars, and became an important monument of the city.

During the period of the Ottoman occupation, the building was used as a mosque and named after Yussuf Pasha. After World War II it served as a storehouse for military equipment, until it was converted into the museum in 1962.

In 2020, the Museum closed and reopened in 2022 at a new location on Skra Street in Halepa.

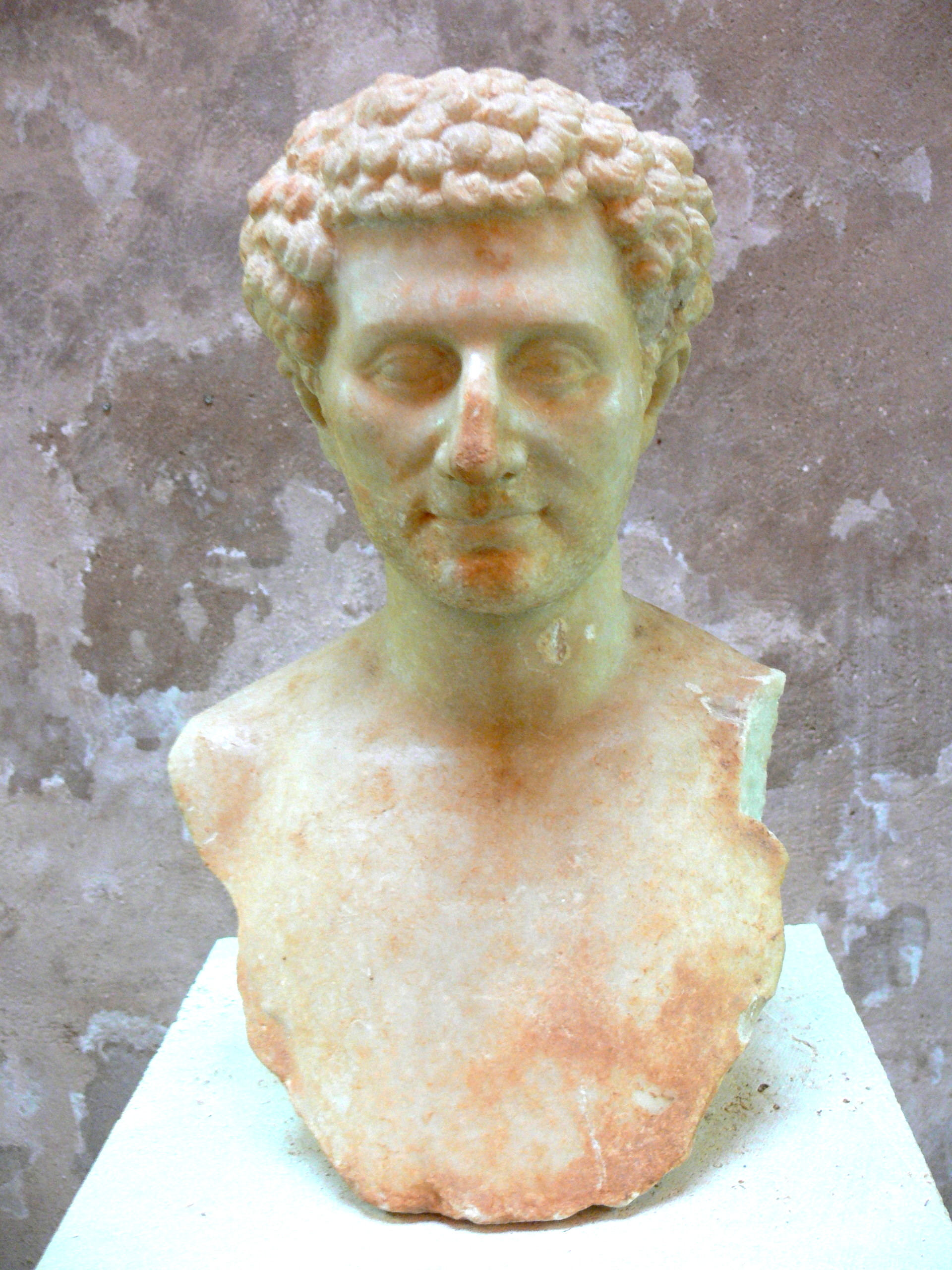
Portrait bust of a Roman man

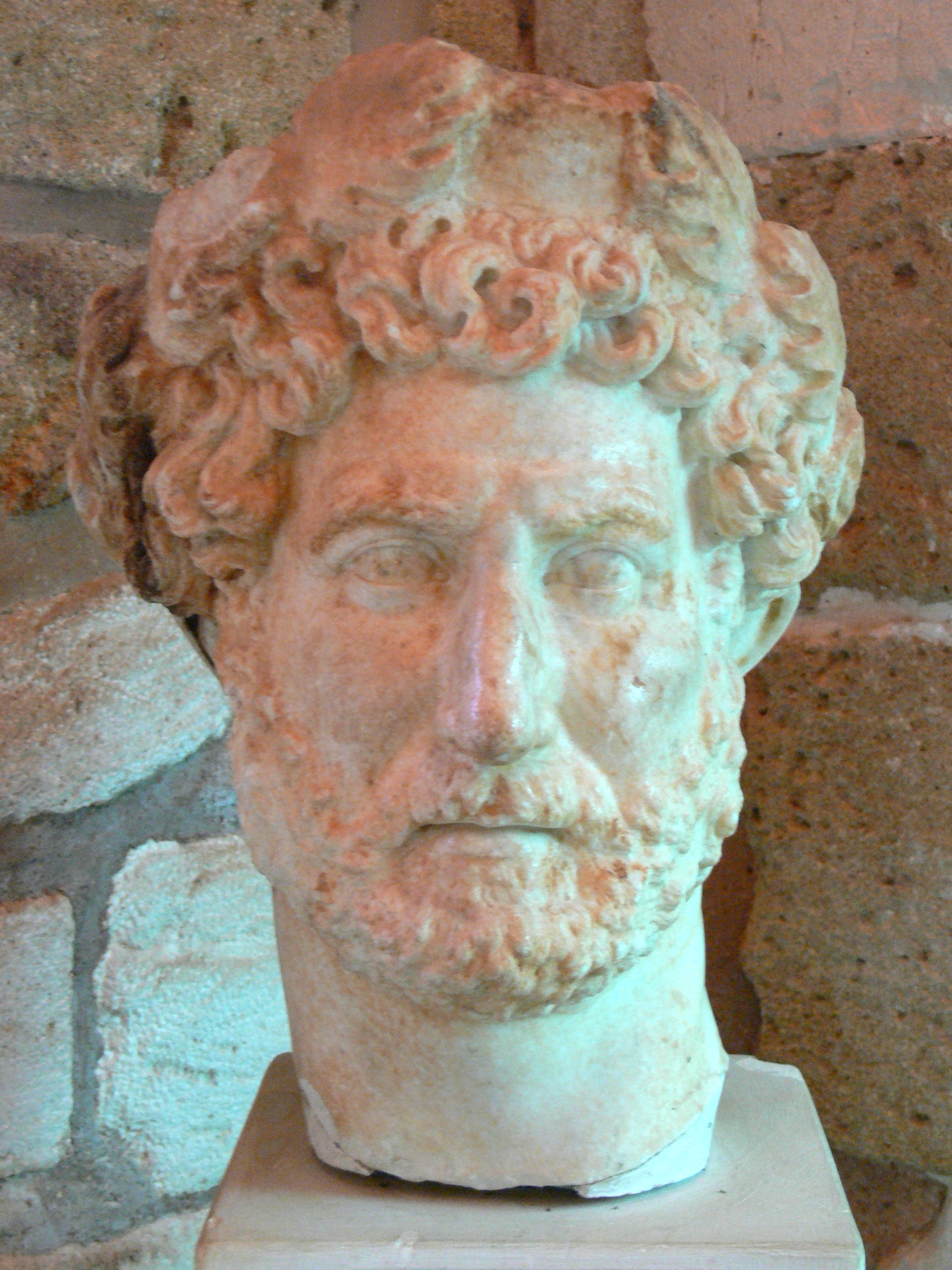
Roman emperor Hadrian

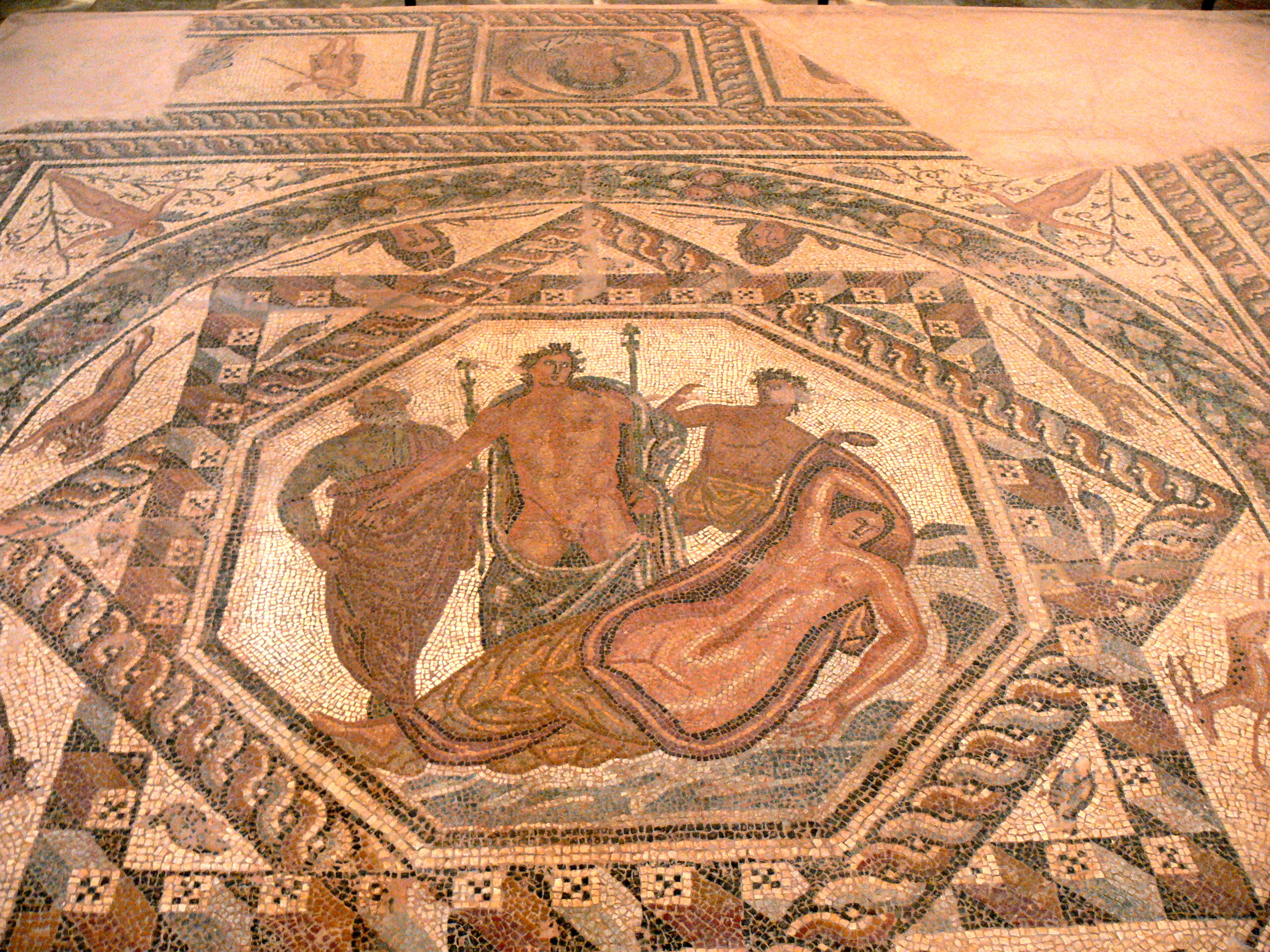
Roman floor mosaic depicting Dionysos and Ariadne

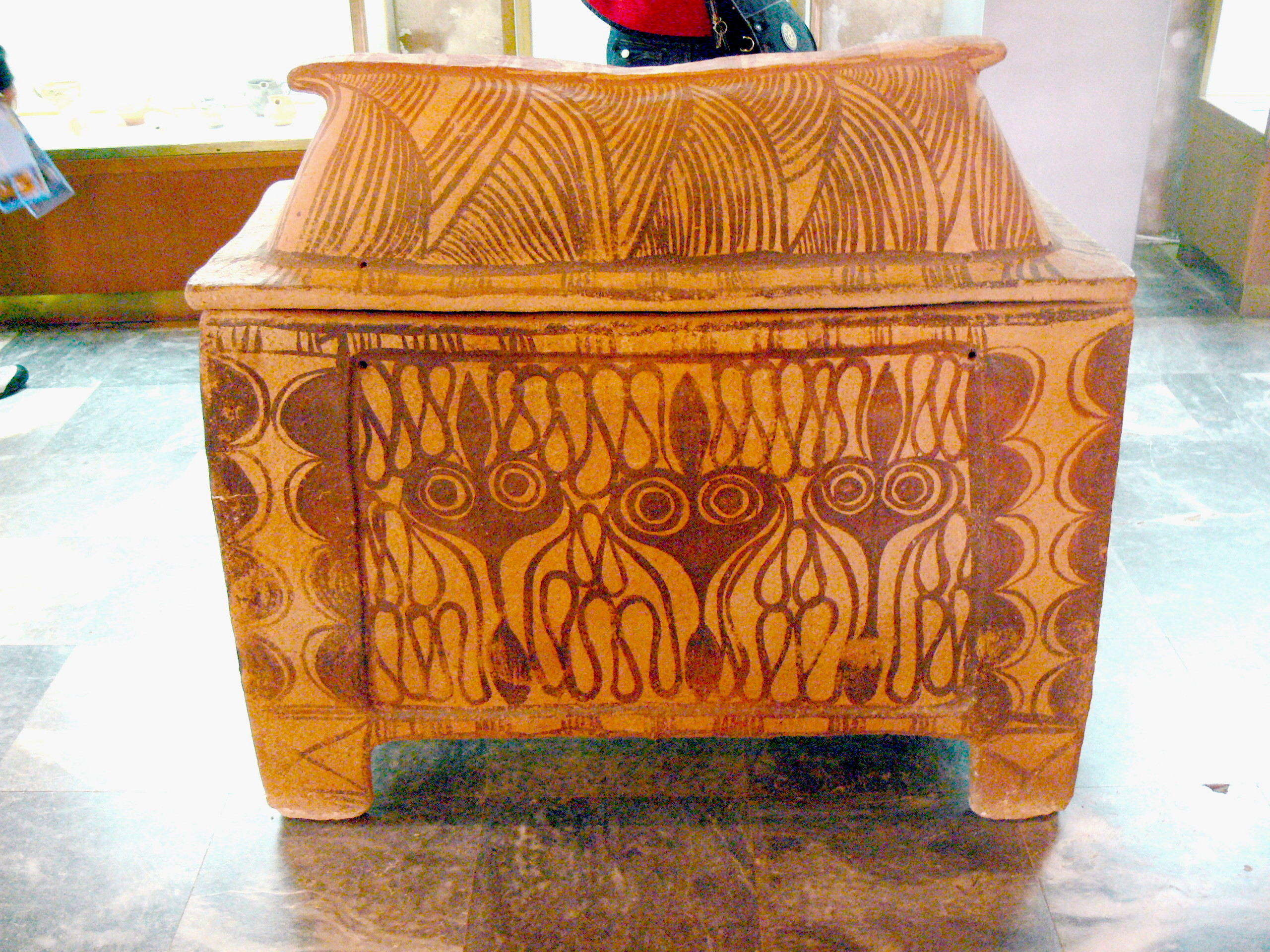
Late Minoan sarcophagus, 1400-1200 BC.

== Interior ==
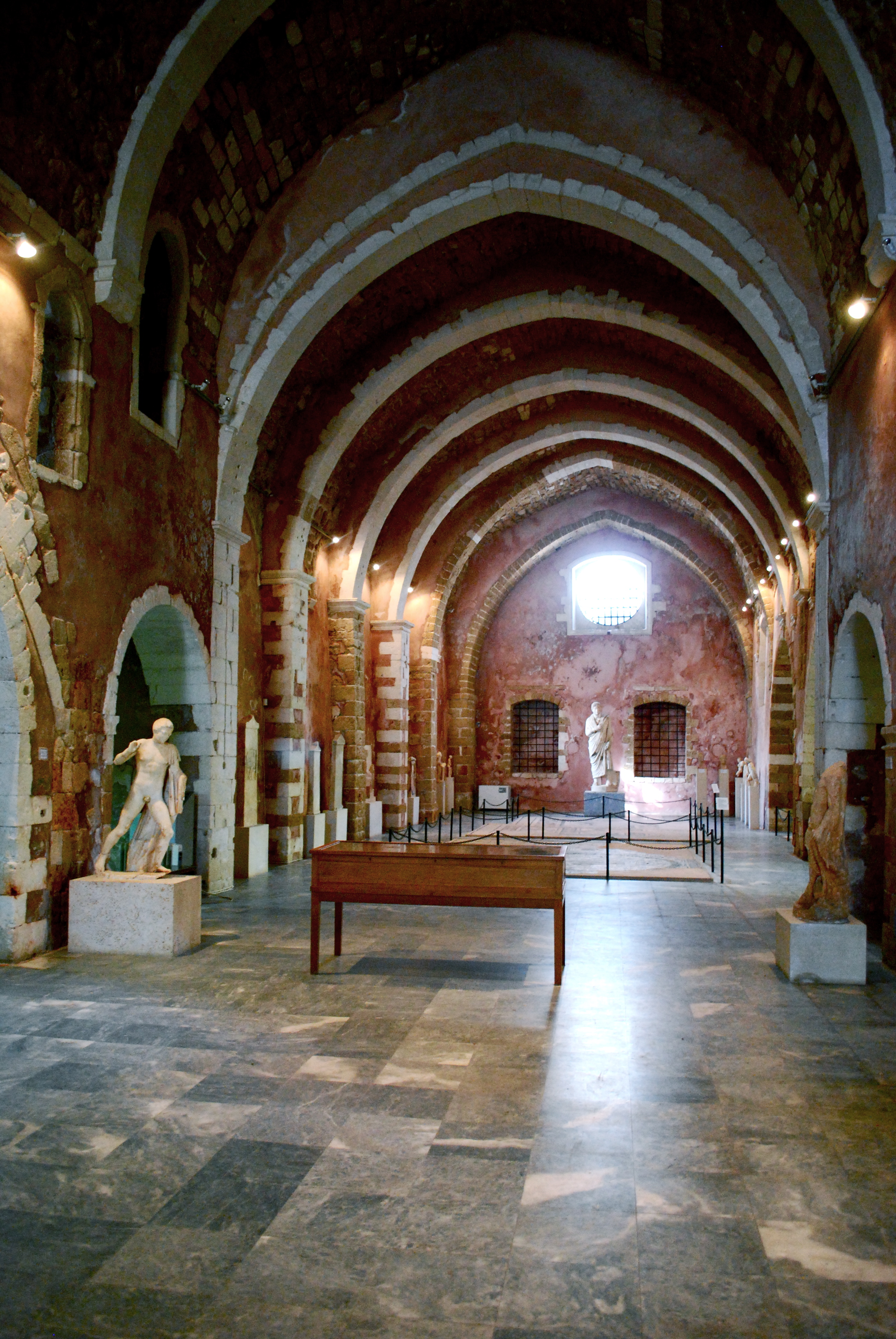
Interior of the old museum (1962–2020)

The museum contains a substantial collection of Minoan and Roman artifacts excavated from around the city of Chania and the surrounding regional unit, including pieces from the ancient cities of Kydonia, Idramia, Aptera, Polyrinia, Kissamos, Elyros, Irtakina, Syia and Lissos, and also from Axos and Lappa in Rethymno regional unit.

The museum contains a wide range of coins, jewellery, vases, sculpture, clay tablets with inscriptions, stelae and mosaics.

The museum has a Roman floor mosaic, depicting Dionysos and Ariadne. The Archaeological Museum of Chania also has an ancient Cycladic style vessel from Episkopi, Kissamos and a number of busts including one of Roman emperor Hadrian, found at the Dictynaion sanctuary in 1913 and a late Minoan sarcophagus from the necropolis of Armeni, dated to 1400–1200 BC. There is also a spherical flask, noted for its unusual ceramic type, dated to the Late Minoan III period.

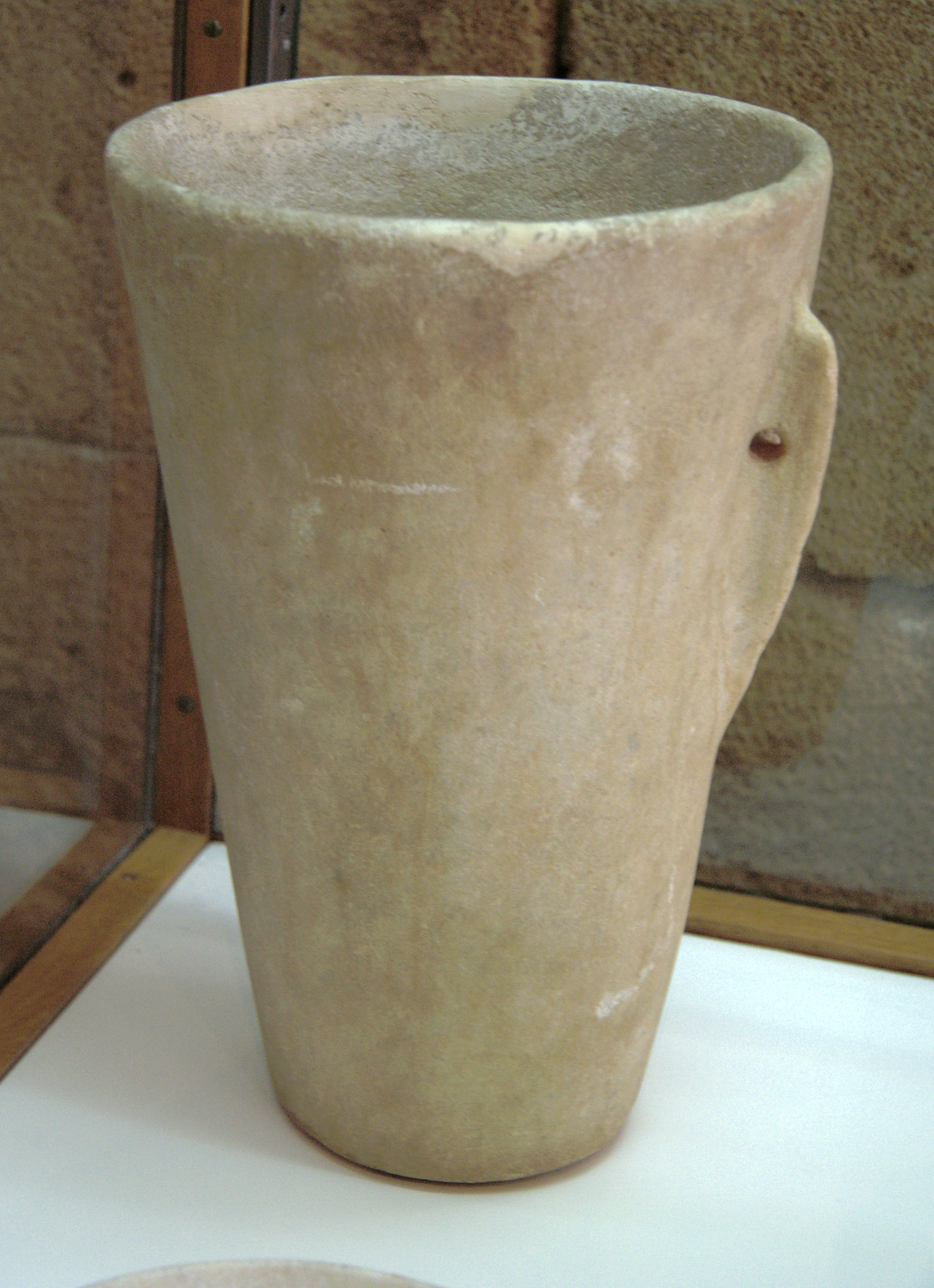
Cycladic type tall cup, marble, 3200-2500 B.C.

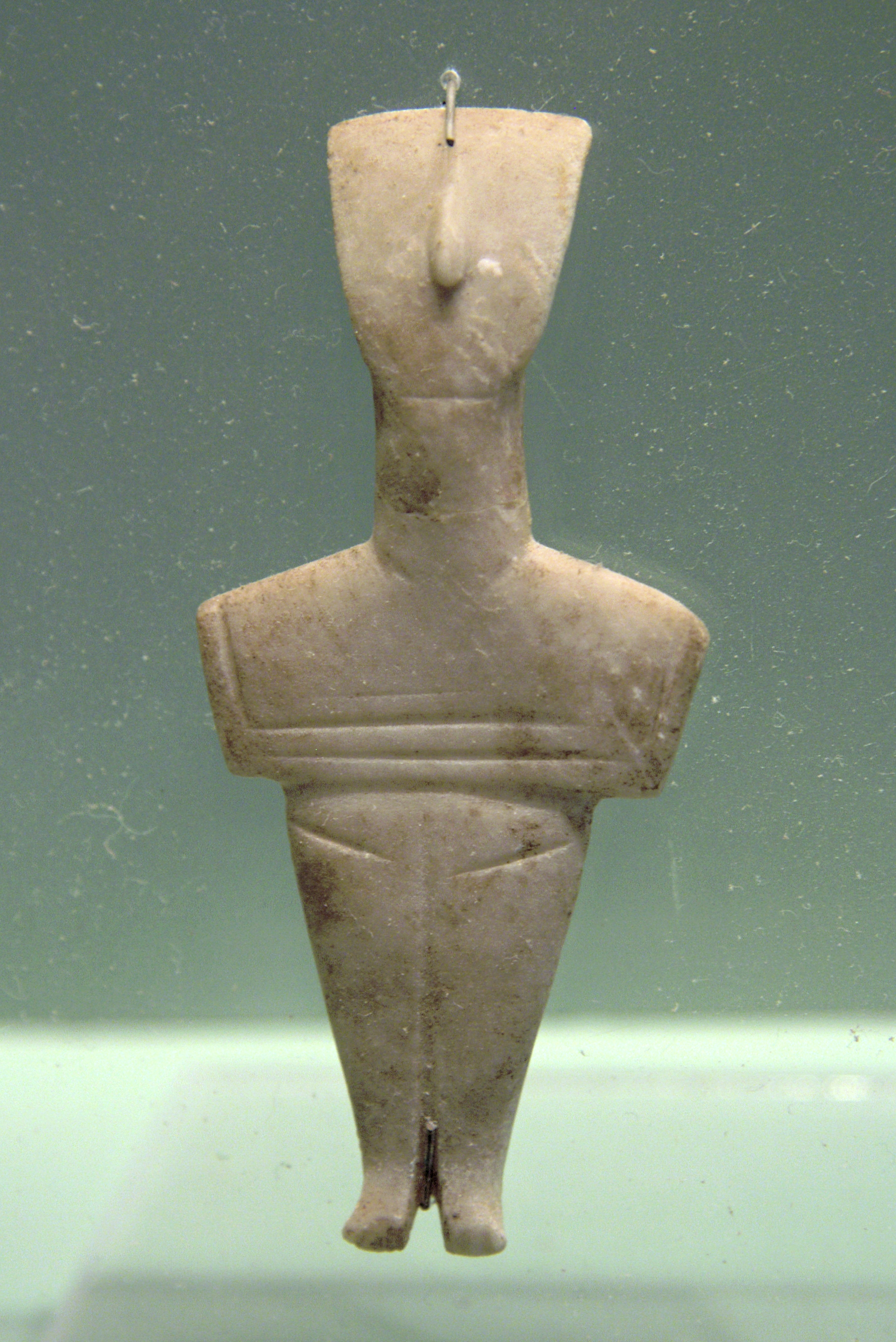
Cycladic type figurine, Koumasa variety, 2800-2200 B.C.

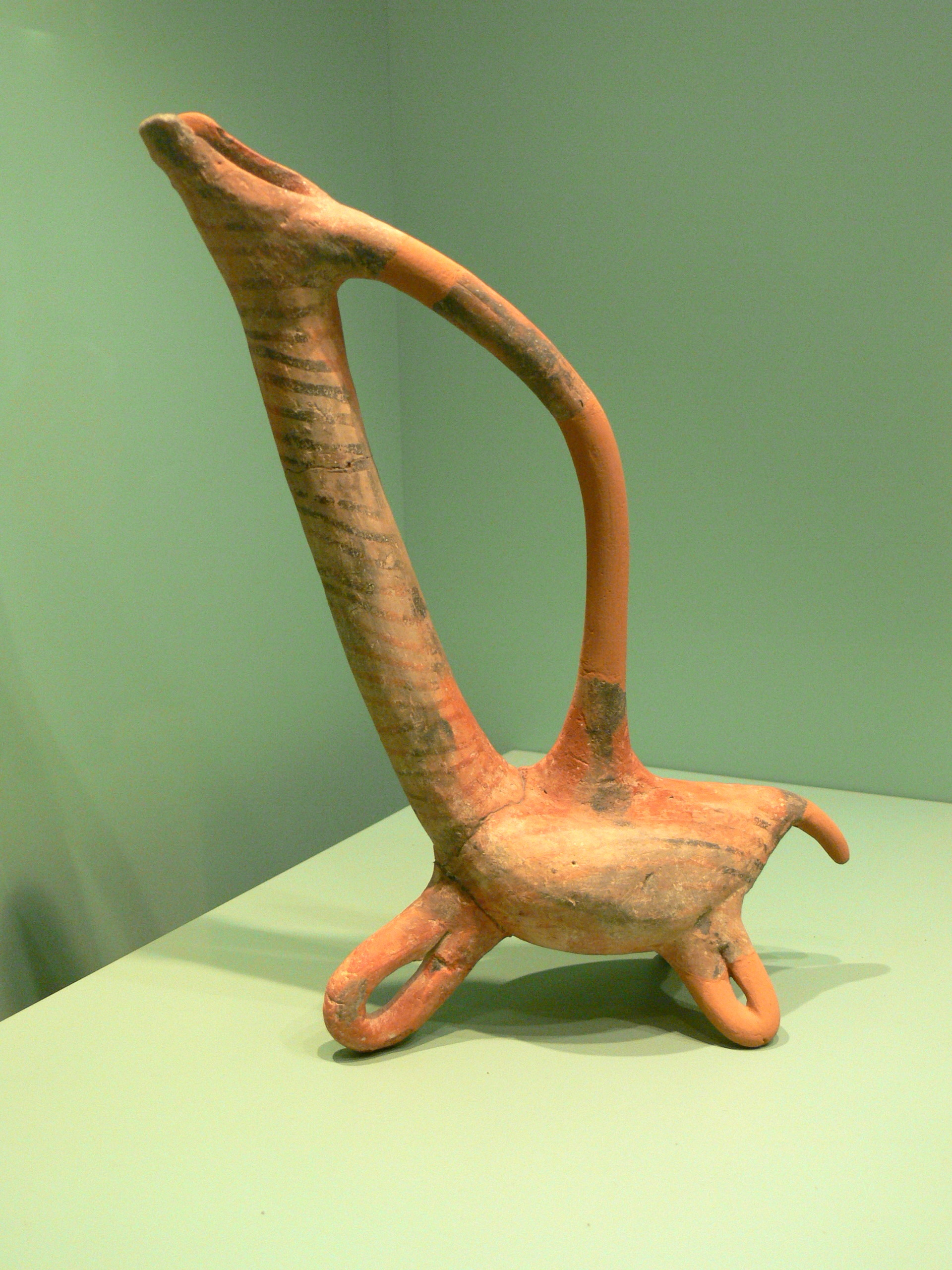
Early Minoan bird-shaped vessel. Koumasa ware, 3000 - 2300 B.C.

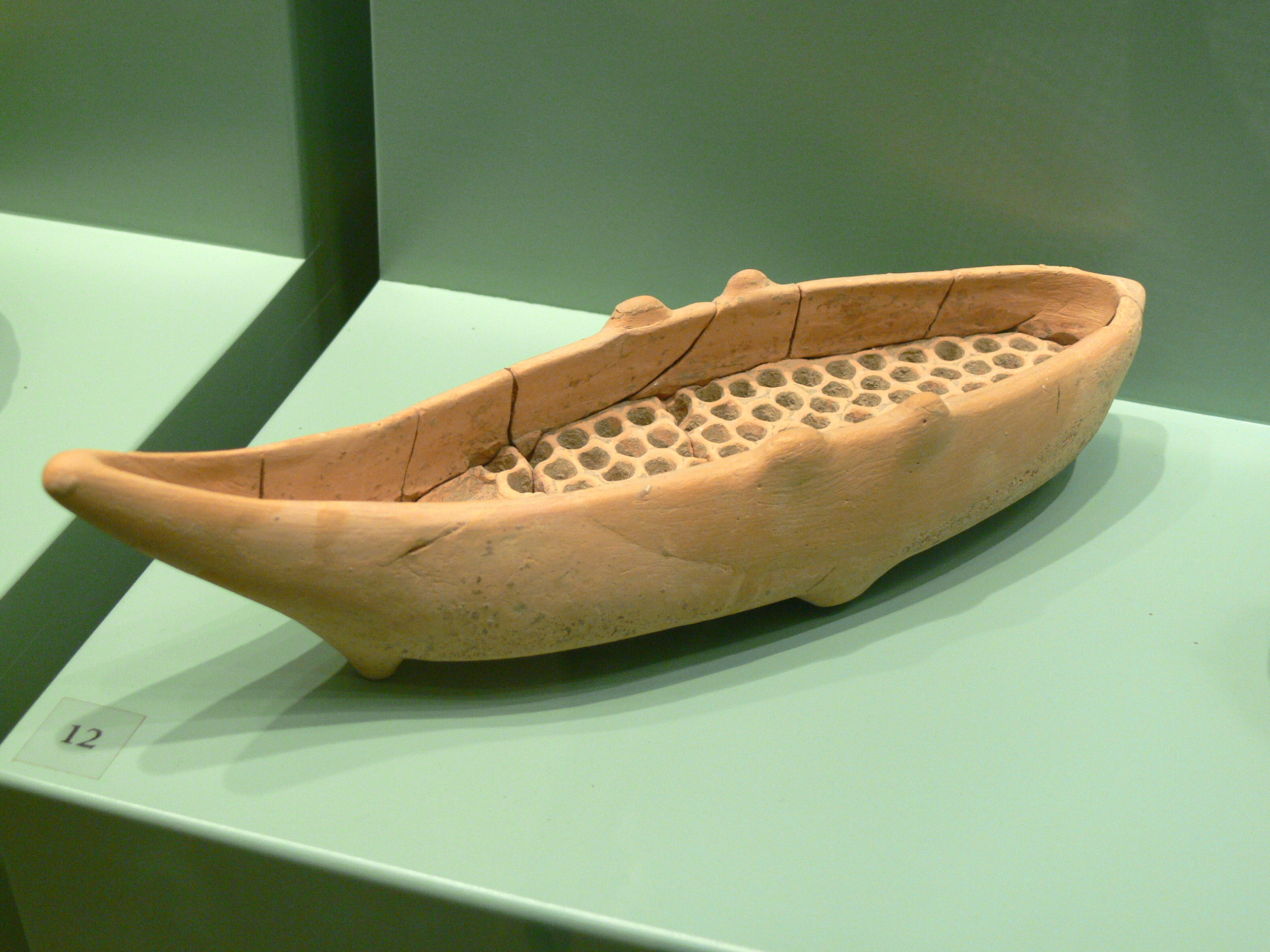
Model of an early Minoan ship. Odegetria Monastery area in Asteroussia, 1900 - 1700 B.C.

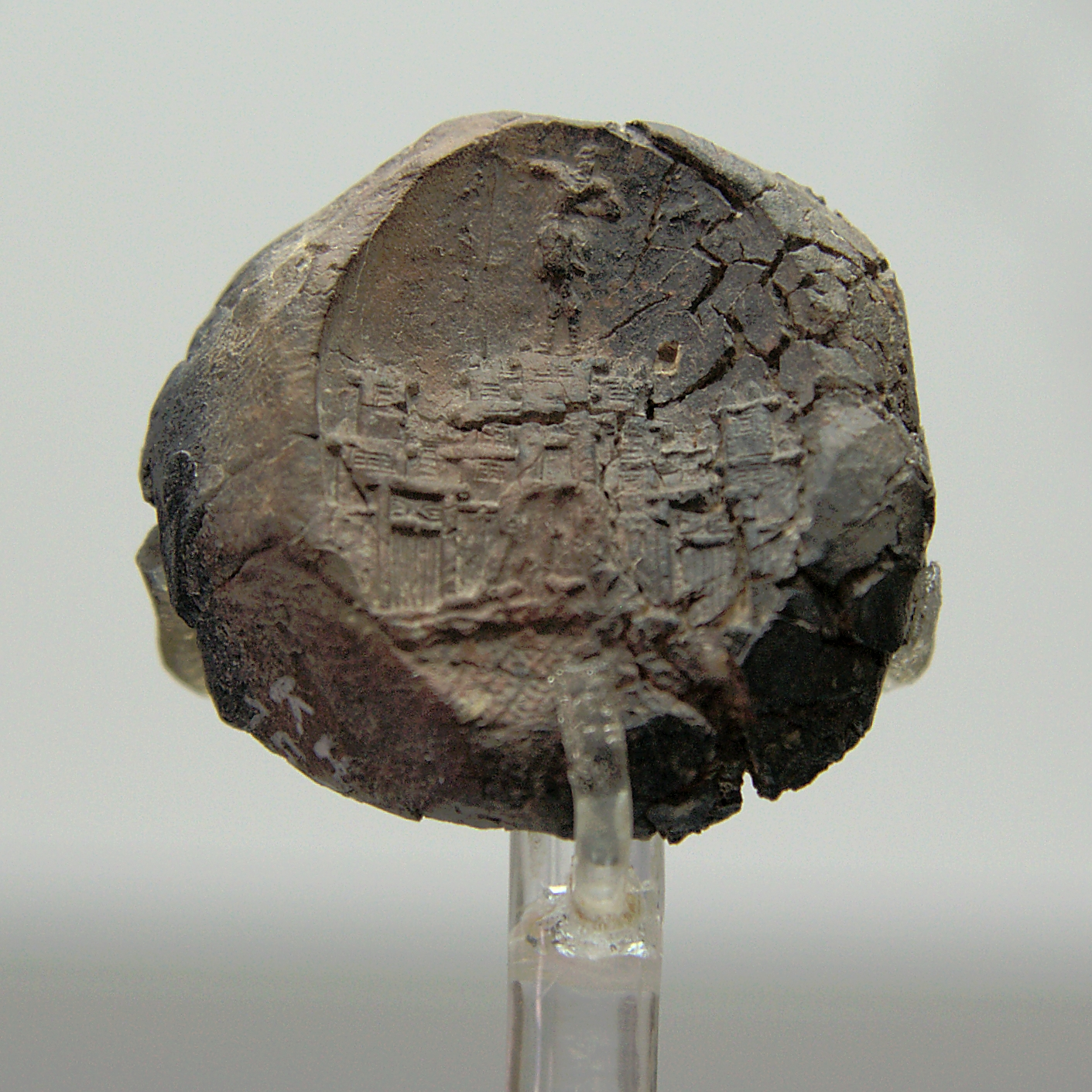
Imprint of Minoan seal, Kastelli, 1450-1400 B.C.

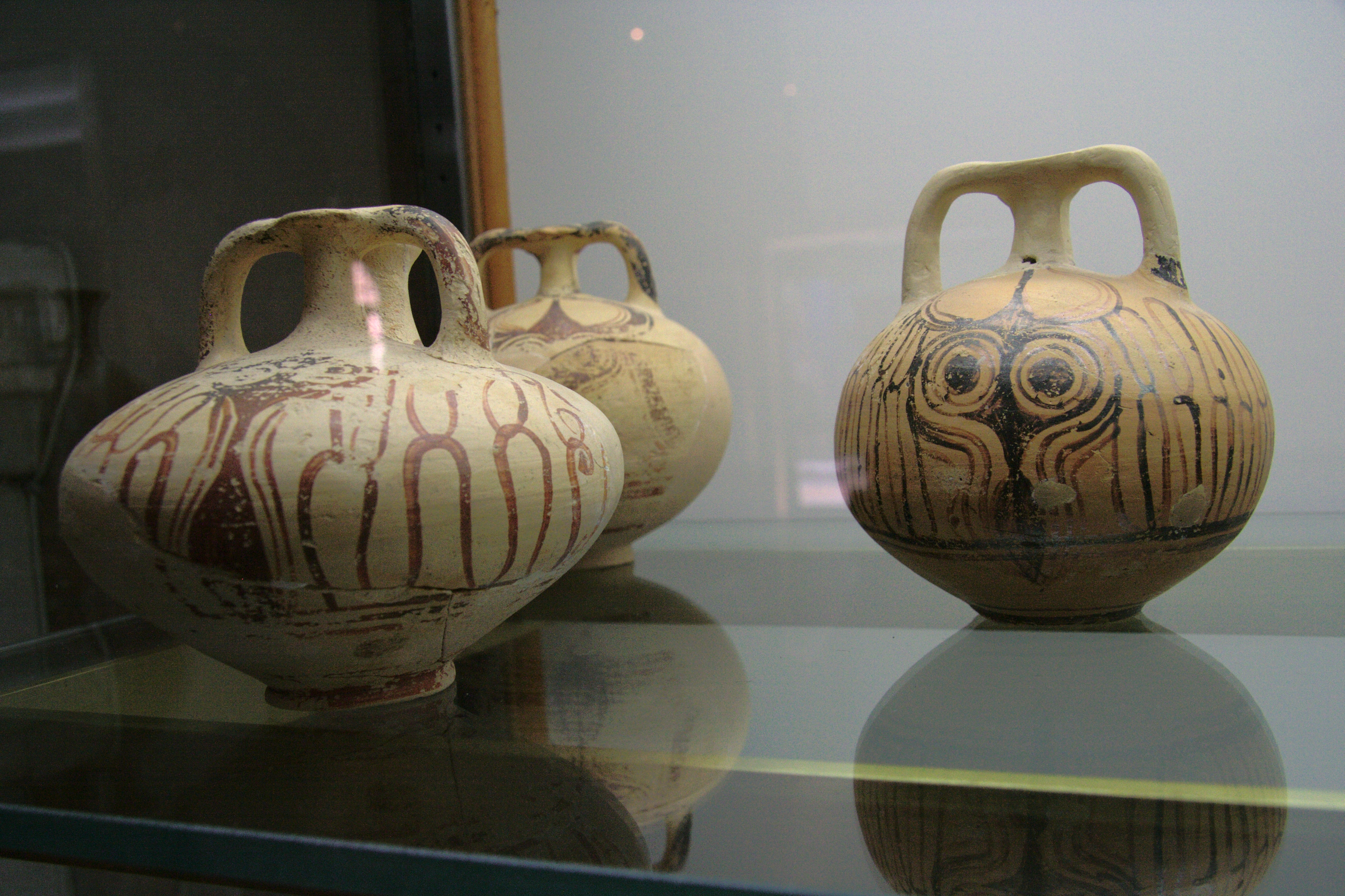
Neopalatial Minoan pottery

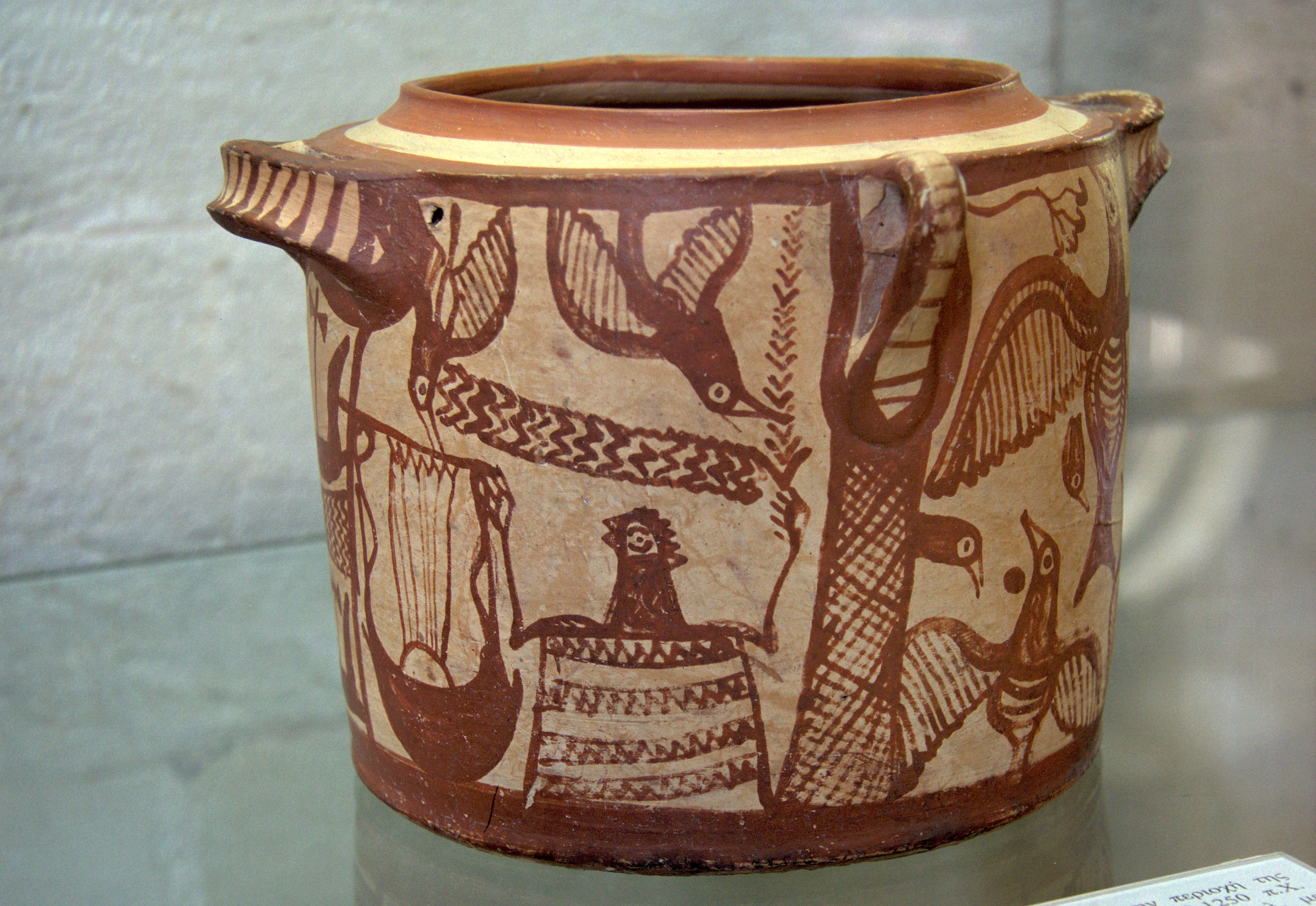
Clay pyxis, Minoan funeral ceremony, 1300-1250 B.C.

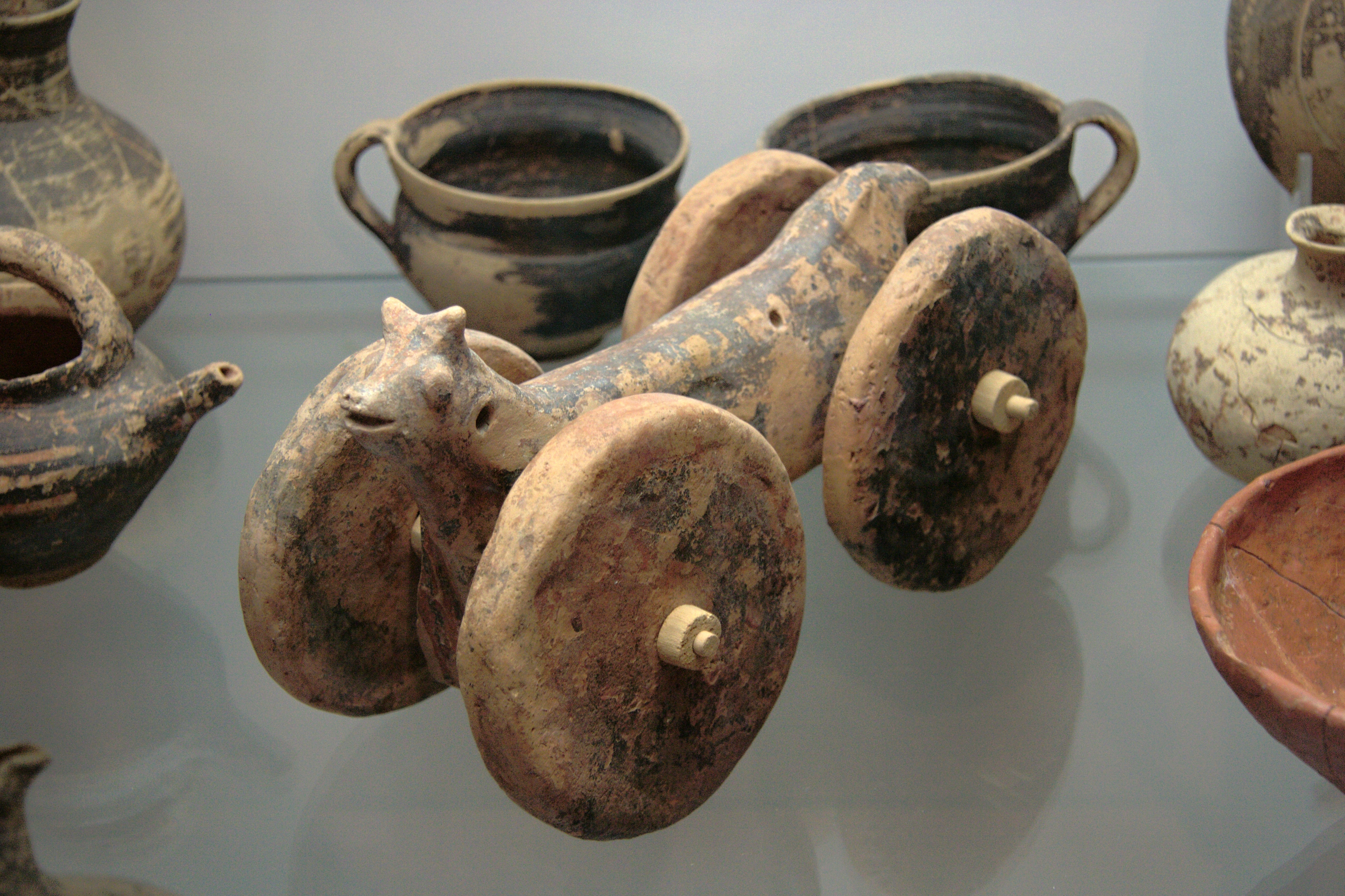
Clay oxen wheel, a toy, 800-700 B.C.

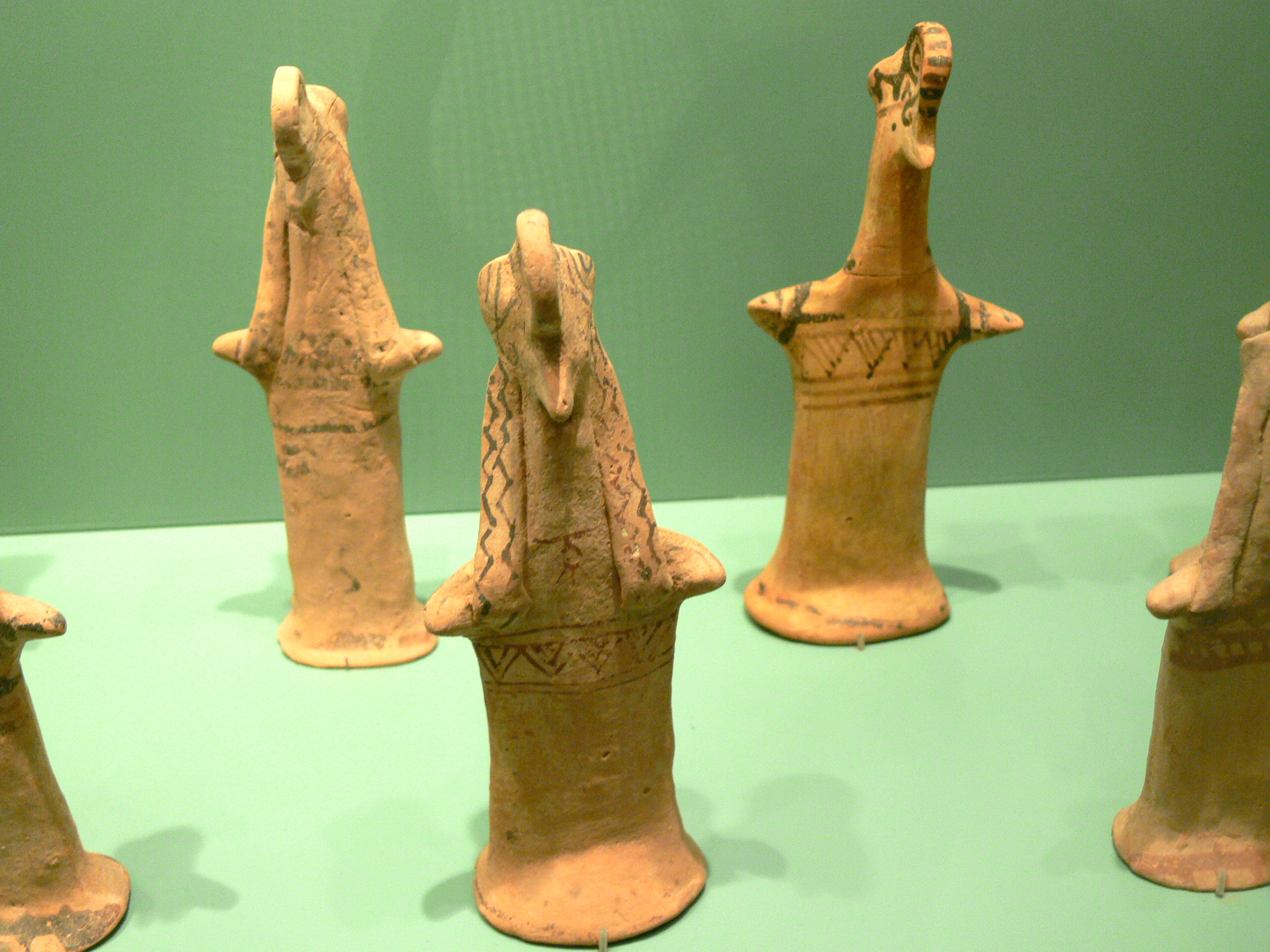
Clay figurines of bird-faced women. Boeotioan workshop, 600 - 575 B.C.

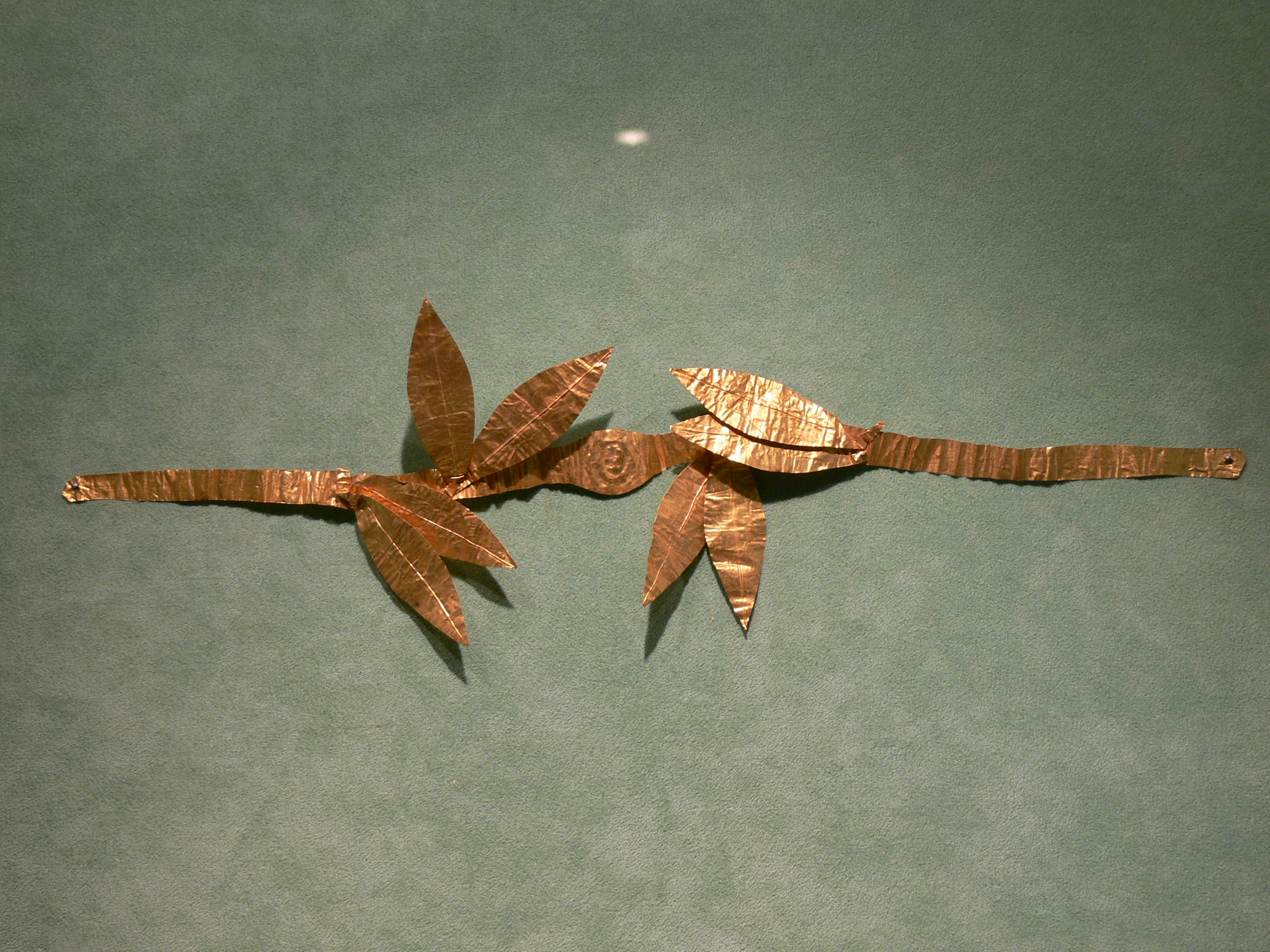
Ancient Greek golden diadem

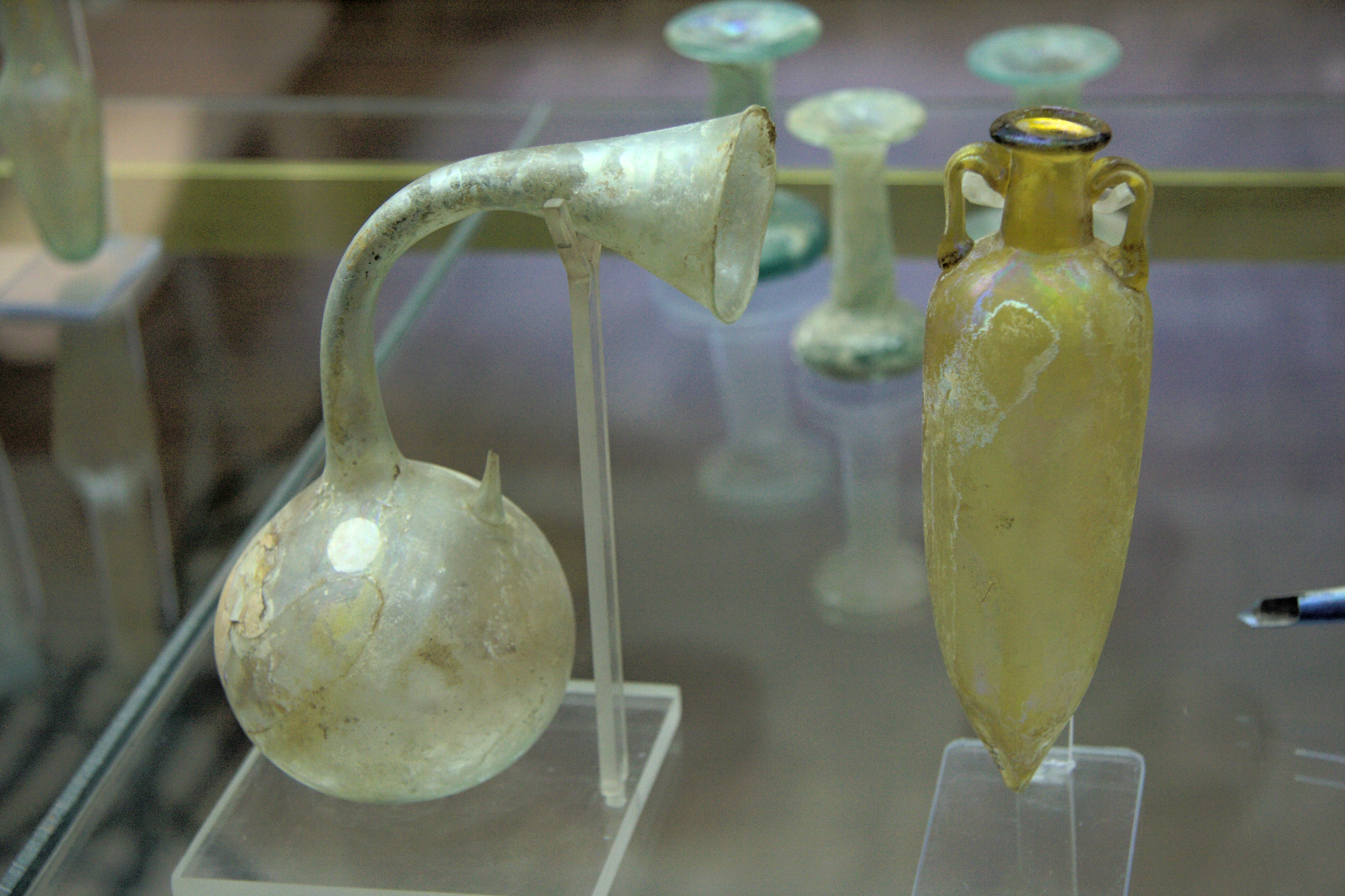
Hellenistic glassware

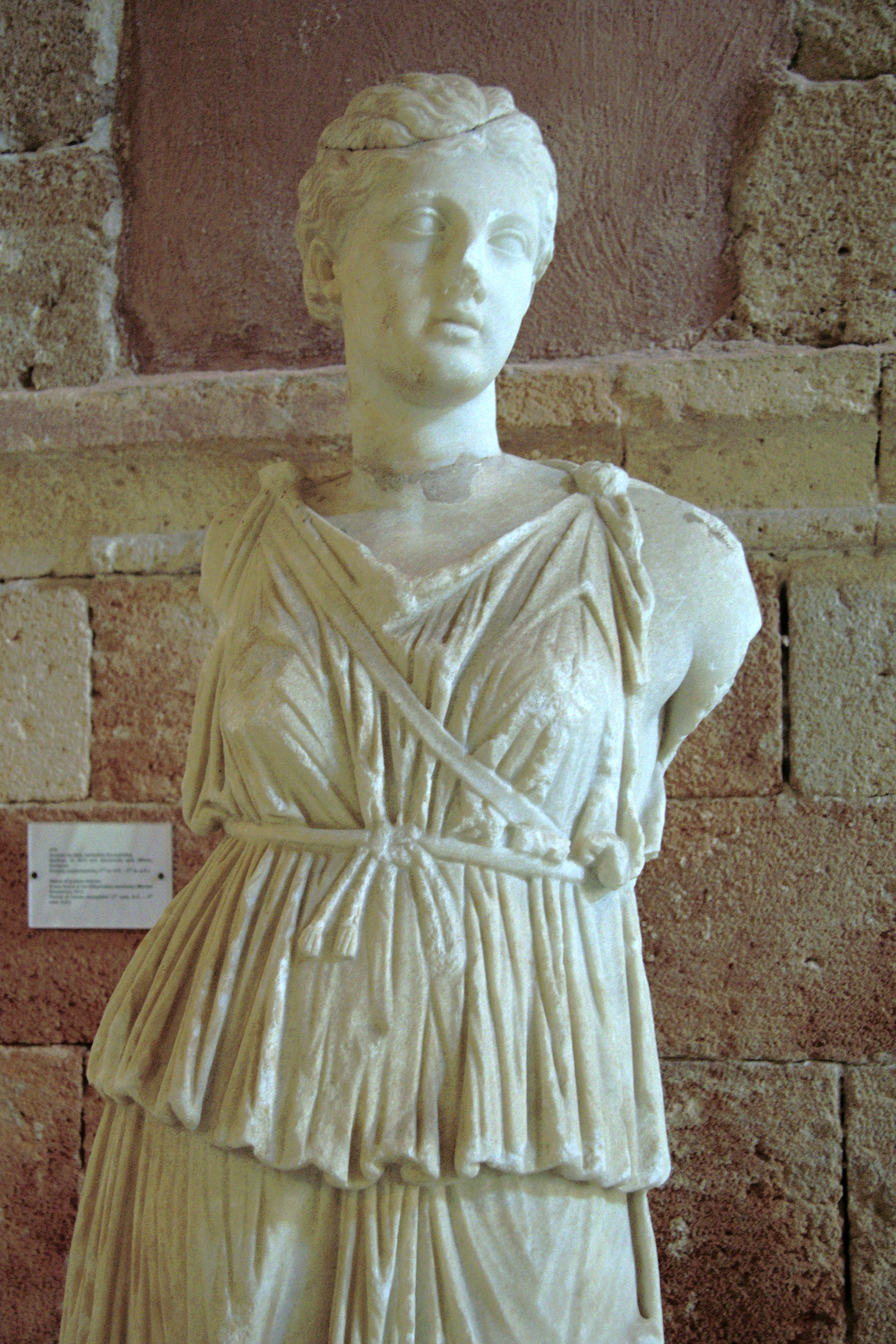
Statue of Artemis, Roman age

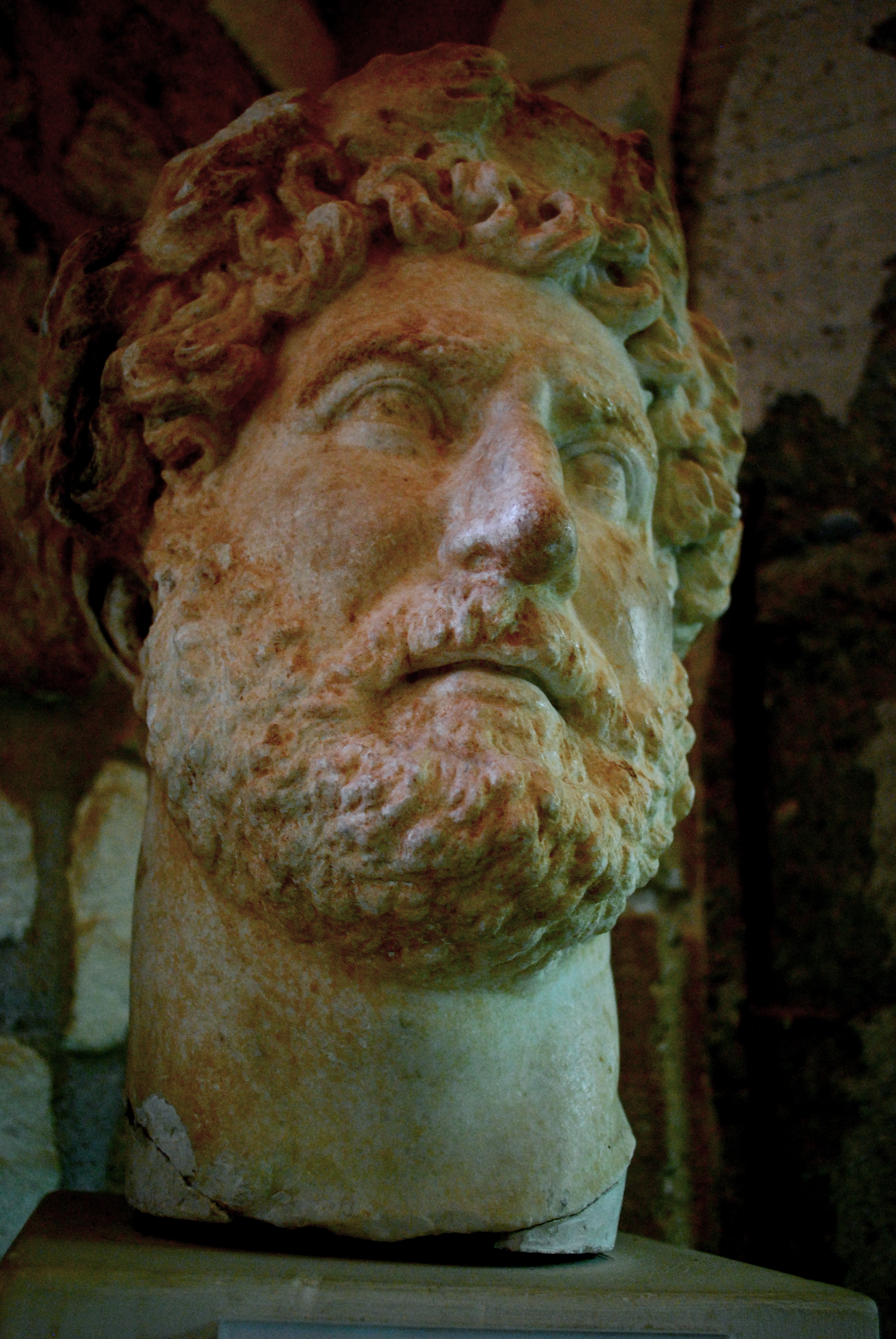
Bust of Roman emperor Hadrianus

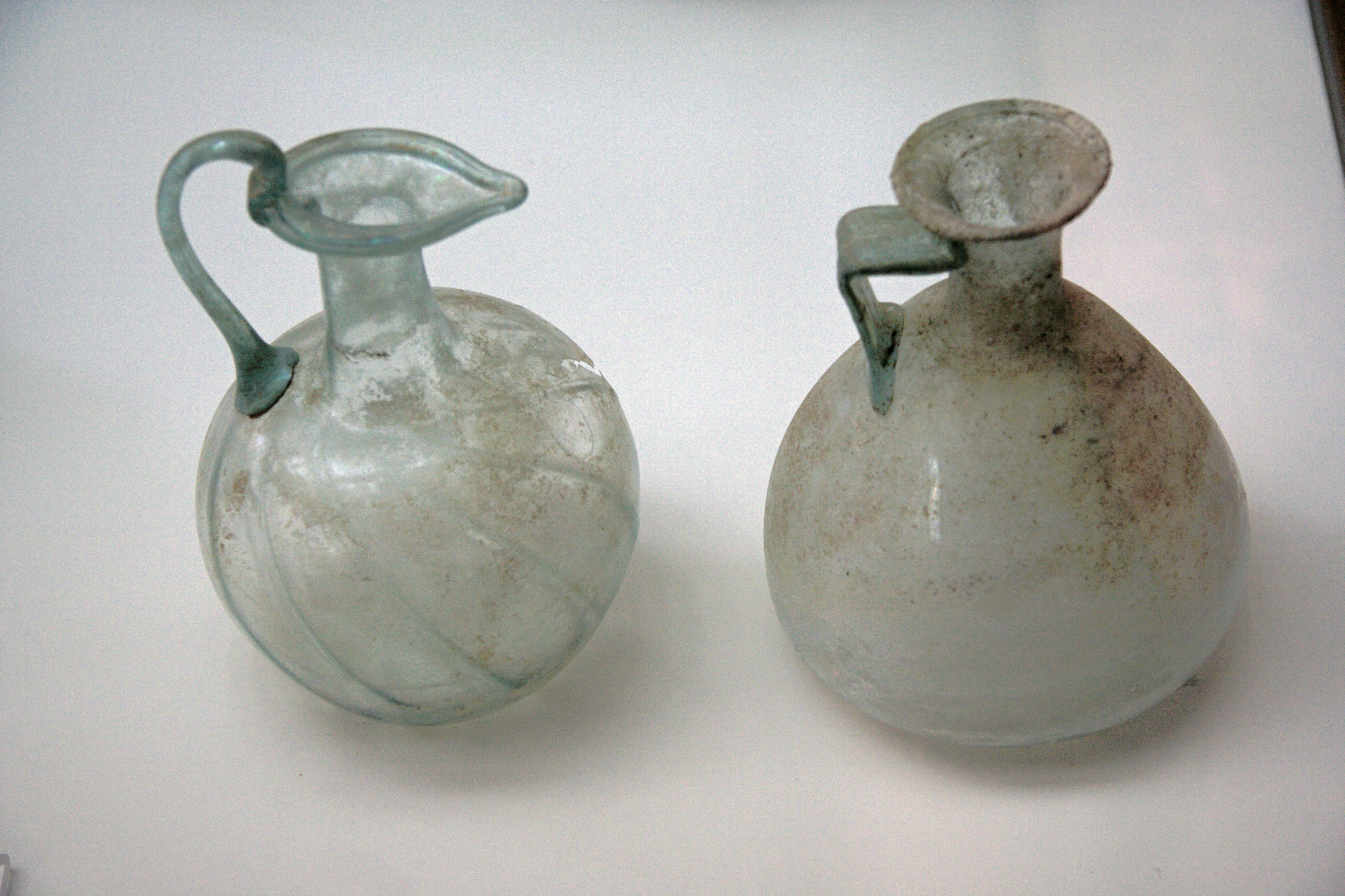
Ancient Roman glassware

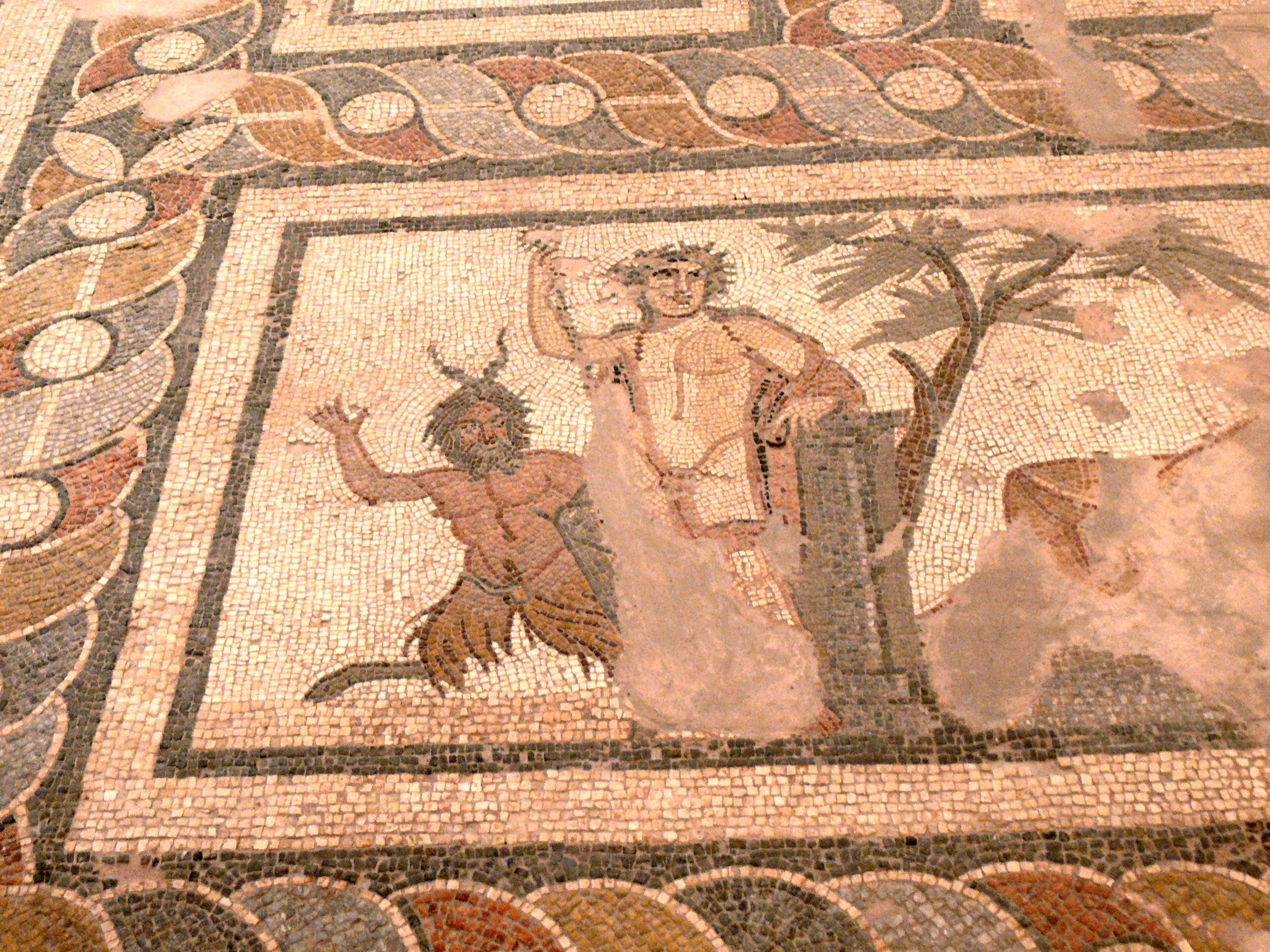
Roman Age mosaic, Dionysos and satyr
