= Poecilasium =

Coordinates: 35°14′24″N 23°52′44″E

Poecilasium or Poikilasion (Ancient Greek: Ποικιλάσιον) or Poecilassus or Poikilassos (Ποικίλασσος) was a town on the south coast of ancient Crete. Ancient sources disagree as to its location: Ptolemy places the town east of Tarrha, between it and the promontory called Hermaea; the Stadiasmus Maris Magni places it west of Tarrha, between it and Syia 60 stadia from the former and 50 stadia from the latter. Poecilasium was not an autonomous city-state (polis).

In the town there was found inscription that testifies to the existence of Temple of Serapis. There were also found hollowed tombs in the rocks and marble pits. In the 918 Code of Markian Library, it is called Pecilasio overo Pescalio.

The site of Poecilasium is located near modern Trypiti; confirming the accuracy of Stadiasmus and the error of Ptolemy.
