= Carmanor of Crete =

Cretan priest in Greek mythology

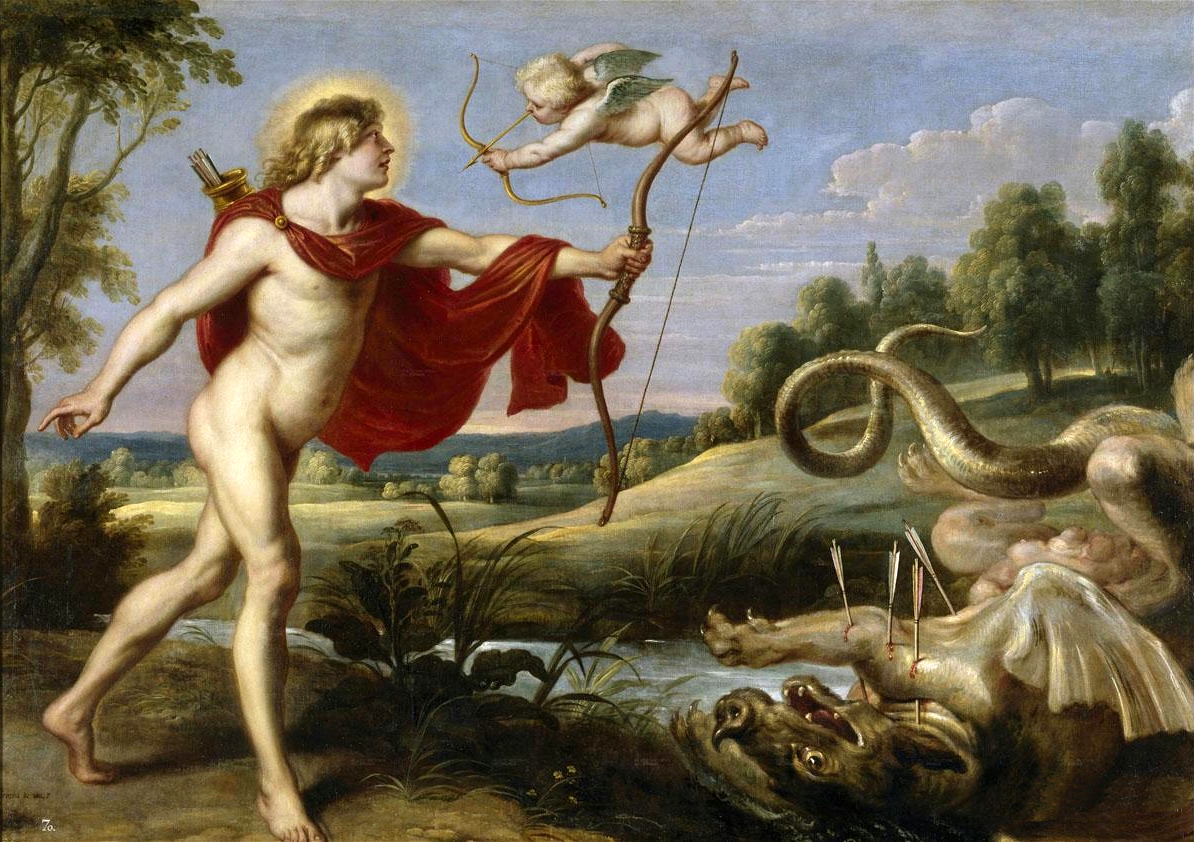
Apollo and the Python

In Greek mythology, Carmanor or Karmanor (Ancient Greek: Καρμάνωρ Karmánōr) was a Cretan priest who purified Apollo after he killed the Delphic dragon Python. He was the father of two children: Eubuleus and Chrysothemis, possibly by Demeter. According to Walter Burkert, the name Carmanor "does not appear to be Greek".

== Mythology ==
According to second-century geographer Pausanias, when Apollo and Artemis had killed Python, the dragon at Delphi, they came to Carmanor in Crete to be purified, and it was in Carmanor's house in Tarrha that Apollo mated with Acacallis, producing the offspring Phylacides and Philander.

According to Pausanias, Carmanor had two children: Eubuleus, whose daughter Carme was the mother, by Zeus, of Britomartis, and the poet Chrysothemis, who was said to have won the victory in the first competition—the singing of a hymn to Apollo—held at the Pythian games at Delphi. Both children may have been demigods of agriculture and the harvest, with Eubuleus being worshipped alongside Persephone in mystery cults.
