= Tarrha =

Ancient Greek city in Crete

Coordinates: 35°13′59″N 23°57′37″E

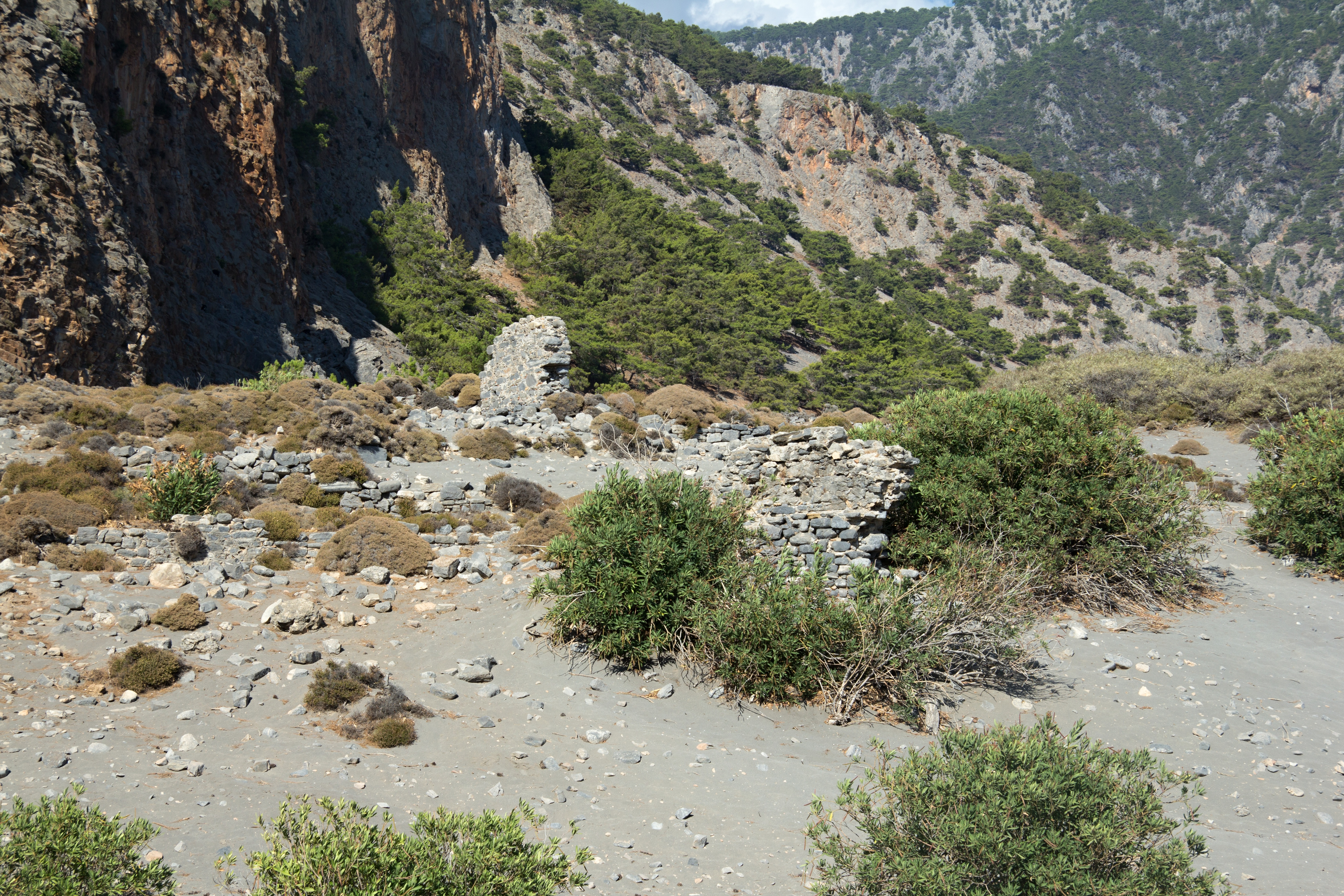
Remains of Tarrha

Tarrha or Tarra (Ancient Greek: Τάρρα), also Tarrhus or Tarros (Τάρρος), was a polis (city-state) in the southwestern part of ancient Crete, near the Samaria Gorge, at the village of Agia Roumeli. It is situated near the sea, on the hill.

== History ==
Tarrha was probably established in the Classical period and was a very important religious centre; it was one of the earliest sites of worship of Apollo. Anciently, it was known on the southern coast between Phoenix and Poecilassus. The city flourished in the Greco-Roman period. The city was home to the cult of Apollo Tarrhaios, where parts of his temple have been found. Tarrha is frequently cited in the ancient sources such as Pausanias, Stephanus of Byzantium, and the Stadiasmus Maris Magni. Tarrha is one of the cities that signed an agreement with Eumenes II in 170 BCE.

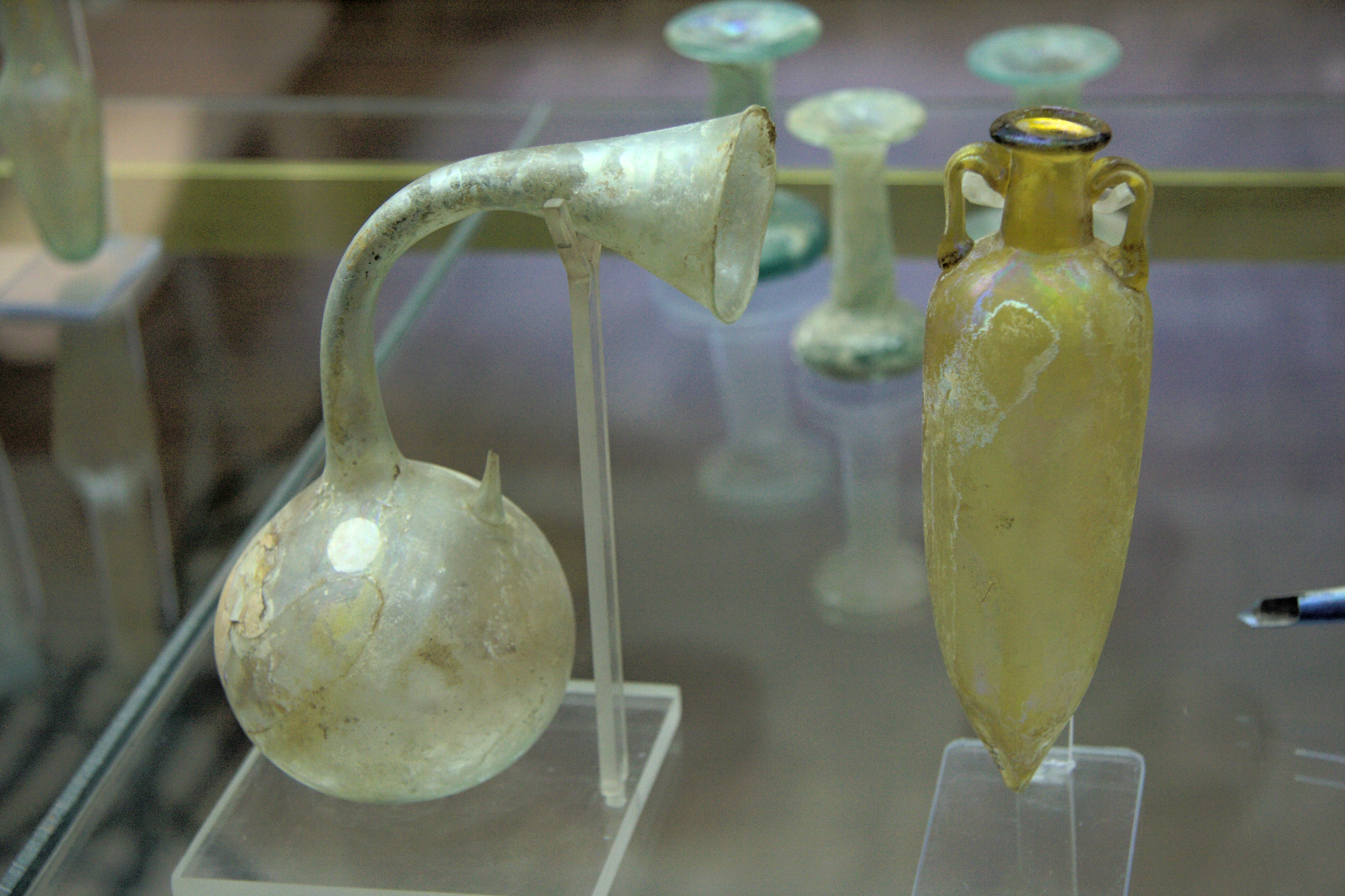
Glass vessels from workshop at Tarrha

In the Middle Ages, Tarrha was known for its glass workshops.

In 1415, Cristoforo Buondelmonti detected in the ruins of the Temple of Apollo, an inscription in Greek which said: “Peel your shoes, cover your head and come in.” A similar inscription was found at the Temple at Matala. The custom of entering the temple without shoes is ancient. According to Greek mythology, Apollo, after murdering Python, went to Tarrha to be cleansed through purgatorial rituals ministered by the temple priest, Carmanor.

Tarrha minted its own coins. The coins have the head of a Cretan wild goat, an arrow, and a bee. Tarrha had monetary union with Elyros, Yrtakina, and Lissos. The coins belong to the 3rd and 2nd centuries BCE, when Tarrha became a member of the Republic of Cretans. The city had established a colony of the same name in the Caucasus. It is also believed that Tarra of south Italy was another colony of the city. It probably founded Lampa, also found on Crete, as well.

It was the birthplace of the author Lucillus of Tarrha (or Loukillos). He commented on the Argonauts of Apollonius of Rhodes. In mythology, Chrysothemis, a poet and the son of Carmanor, was from Tarrha as well. He was a victor at the Pythian Games at Delphi.

Robert Pashley was the first modern archaeologist to find the location of the city and investigate it. The area held scattered stone stele which are inscribed with a double axe symbol. One is exhibited at the Archaeological Museum of Chania.

== Sources ==
- Catholic Encyclopaedia
- 1911 Encyclopædia Britannica
