= Cantanus =

Town of ancient Crete

Coordinates: 35°19′37″N 23°44′26″E

Cantanus or Kantanos (Ancient Greek: Κάντανος), or Cantania or Kantania (Καντανία), was town of ancient Crete, which the Peutinger Table fixes at 24 M.P. from Cisamus. It was a bishop's see under the Byzantine Empire, and when the Venetians obtained possession of the island they established a Latin bishop here, as in every other diocese. No longer the site of a residential bishop, it remains a titular see of the Roman Catholic Church.

In the 19th century, Robert Pashley found remains of this city on a conical hill about a mile to the south of Khádros, now called Kandanos. The walls can be traced for little more than 150 paces; the style of their masonry attests a high antiquity.
