= Lappa (Crete) =

Former town in Crete

Coordinates: 35°17′20″N 24°20′10″E

Lappa (Ancient Greek: Λάππα) was an ancient city in Crete. It was located near modern Argyroupoli.

== Name ==
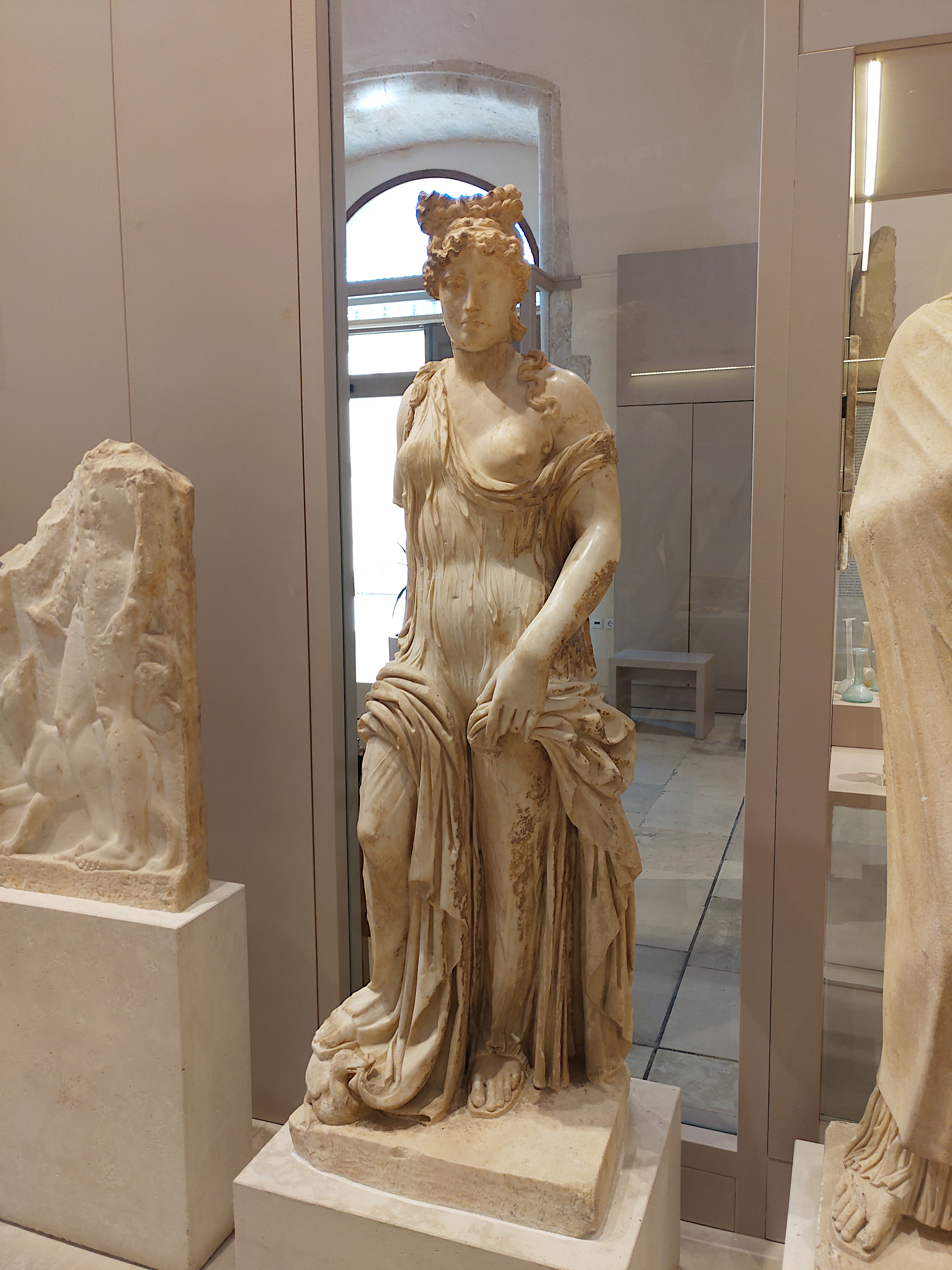
Aphrodite Rhithymnia, Roman statue found in Lappa.

Ancient sources alternatively spell the name Lappa (Ancient Greek: Λάππα), or Lampa (Λάμπα), or Lampae or Lampai (Λάμπαι), or Lampe (Λάμπη), On coins, the name is always rendered Λάππα. Stephanus of Byzantium claims that the names denote the same place.

== Textual sources ==
Stephanus of Byzantium reports a mythic tradition that the city was founded by Agamemnon, and was named after a Tarrhaean man. Strabo claims that Lappa controlled the port of Phoenix.

Polybius reports that Lappa provided refuge to the population of Lyktos after their city was destroyed by Knossos. Dio Cassius claims that Lappa was almost entirely destroyed during the Roman conquest of Crete, but was later restored and granted special privileges by Augustus in return for the citizens' support against Marcus Antonius.

Lappa became a Christian episcopal see. The name of its bishop is recorded as present at the Council of Ephesus of 431, and the Council of Chalcedon of 451, as well as on many other subsequent occasions.

In the 19th century, the English travel writer Robert Pashley visited the site and reported considerable remains of a massive brick edifice, with buttresses 15 feet (4.6 m) wide and of 9 feet (2.7 m) projection; a circular building, 60 feet (18 m) diameter, with niches round it 11 feet (3.4 m) wide; a cistern, 76 by 20 feet (23.2 by 6.1 m); a Roman brick building, and several tombs cut in the rock. One of the inscriptions relating to this city mentions a certain Marcus Aurelius Clesippus, in whose honour the Lappaeans erected a statue.

== Coinage ==
Lappa minted coins with the heads of emperors, including its benefactor Augustus. One such coin bears the epigraph ΘΕΩΚΑΙΣΑΝΙ ΣΕΒΑΣΤΩ. Lappan coins also feature maritime symbols, perhaps reflecting the city's coastal territories.
