= Elyrus =

Coordinates: 35°17′16″N 23°47′44″E

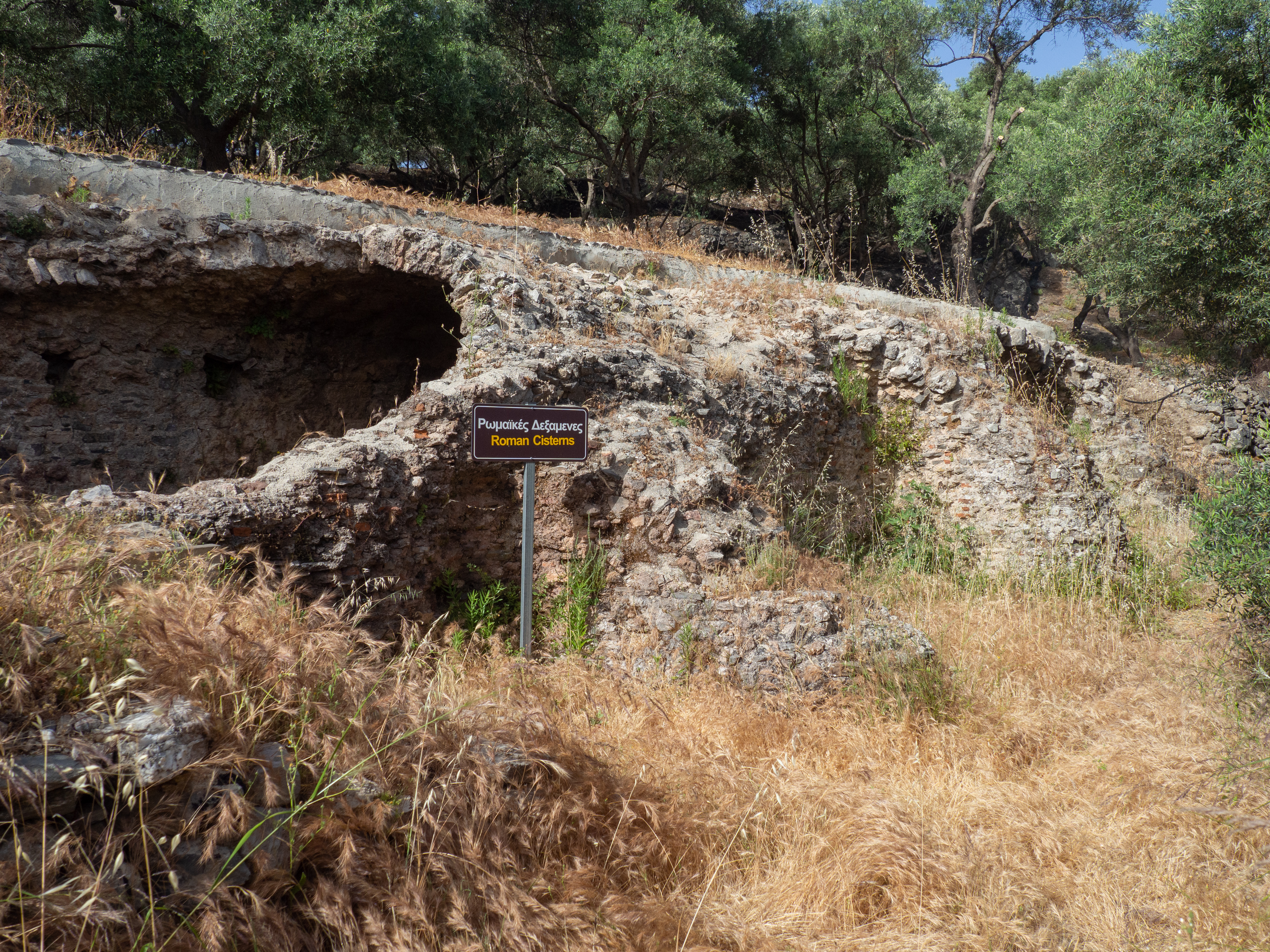
The cisterns of Elyros

Elyrus or Elyros (Ancient Greek: Ἔλυρος) was a town of ancient Crete, which the Periplus of Pseudo-Scylax places between Cydonia and Lissus. It had a harbour, Syia (Συΐα), situated on the south coast of the island, 60 stadia west of Poecilassus. Pausanias states that the city existed in his time in the mountains of Crete. He adds that he had seen at Delphi the bronze goat which the Elyrians had dedicated, and which was represented in the act of giving suckle to Phylacis and Phylander, children of Apollo and the nymph Acacallis, whose love had been won by the youthful god at the house of Casmanor at Tarrha. It was the birthplace of Thaletas, who was considered as the inventor of the Cretic rhythm, the national paeans and songs, with many of the institutions of his country. Elyrus appears in Hierocles' list of Cretan cities, then reduced in number to twenty-one. The coins of this city have the type of a bee upon them.

Its site is located in on Kefala Hill near the village of Rodovani. Robert Pashley discovered the site in the 19th century. The first object that presents itself is a building consisting of a series of arches; next, vestiges of walls, especially on the north and northeast sides of the ancient city. The circuit of these must originally have been two miles (3 km); at a slight elevation above are other walls, as of an acropolis. Further on are some massive stones, some pieces of an entablature, and several fragments of the shafts of columns, all that now remains of an ancient temple.

It has not been excavated.

== History ==
=== Classical Era ===
Elyrus was flourishing at least as early as the Greek Classical Period, e.g. 500 to 350 BCE. In the Classical Period Elyrus was the most important ancient city in southwestern Crete, having about 16,000 inhabitants. It was an industrial and commercial city with large weapons production. Syia and Lissus were its harbours. Apollo, Phylakides and Philandros, sons of Apollo and nymph Akakallida, were worshiped there.

=== Hellenistic Era ===
In the 3rd century BCE, Elyrus was at war with Kydonia, an important center of Cretan power, located in the modern city of Chania. The citizens of Elyrus sent to the Oracle at Delphi a bronze votive complex that represents a goat feeding the sons of Apollo when they were infants. It is also one of the thirty cities that signed the decree with Eumenes II in 183 BCE.

=== Roman Era ===
Elyrus was also important during Roman times. A Roman statue, the Philosopher of Elyrus, was recovered here and is now in the Archaeological Museum of Chania.

=== Byzantine Era ===
During Byzantine times, Elyrus was the seat of an Archbishop. The remains of the bishopric church, a 6th-century basilica, can still be seen in the centre of the old city.

== Archaeology ==
Robert Pashley was the first to identify the location of the city, near the village of Rodovani. French archaeologist L. Thenon studied the ruins of the city more carefully and discovered the inscription that says: “it seemed to the city of the Elyrians”.

== Sources ==
- The History of Crete: Chronological order of the history of Crete
- C. Michael Hogan, Cydonia, Modern Antiquarian, January 23, 2008
