= Stadiasmus Maris Magni =

Ancient Roman periplus

The Stadiasmus Maris Magni or Stadiasmus sive Periplus Maris Magni or Stadiasmus of the Great Sea (Ancient Greek: Σταδιασμός ήτοι περίπλους της μεγάλης θαλάσσης) is an ancient Roman periplus or guidebook detailing the ports sailors encounter on the shores of the Mediterranean Sea. The stadiasmus provides distances, sailing directions and descriptions of specific ports. It was written in Ancient Greek and survives in fragments. The work was written by an anonymous author and is dated to the second half of the third century AD. The most complete Greek text together with a Latin translation was published in 1855 by Karl Müller as part of his work Geographi Graeci Minores.

== Sources ==
- Bunson, Matthew (2002). Encyclopedia of the Roman Empire. New York City: Facts on File, Inc. ISBN 978-1-4381-1027-1.
