= Robert Pashley =

Robert Pashley (4 September 1805 – 29 May 1859) was a 19th-century English traveller, lawyer and economist.

Pashley was born in York and he studied at Trinity College, Cambridge. Distinguished in mathematics and Classics, in 1830 he was elected a Fellow of Trinity at his first sitting. In 1832 he took his MA degree, and as a travelling Fellow undertook a journey in Italy, Greece, Asia Minor and Crete, of which he published his two-volume Travels in Crete. His work is considered a classic of writing on the Ottoman Empire, with his detailed observations on local geography, customs, and social issues.

In 1837, he was called to the Bar by the Inner Temple. He lost his valuable library and antiquities in fire at Temple in 1838. He was appointed as a queen's counsel in 1851

He stood for Parliament in the 1852 general election for King's Lynn but was not elected.

In 1853 he married Marie, the only daughter of Baron Von Lauer of Berlin. They had three children.

He published two works on economics: On Pauperism (1854), and Observations on the government bill for abolishing the Removal of the Poor (1854).

He died in 1859 at 16, Manchester Square, London and was buried at the Kensal Green cemetery.

== Studies of Crete ==
Pashley was one of the foremost researchers of Cretan culture in the first half of the nineteenth century. Pashley was the first one to work out the location of the ancient buried city of Cydonia, relying only on ancient literature, without the aid of archaeological recovery. In his travel to Crete in 1830 he observed that Greek was the common language of the island that was then part of the Ottoman Empire, even though a substantial part of the population was then Muslim.
