= Skordilis =

Skordilis is a surname. Notable people with the surname include:

- Antonios Skordilis (1654–1731), Greek painter.
- Emmanuel Skordilis (1627-35–1671), Greek painter.
- Ioannis Skordilis (1690–1750), Greek painter
- Gaios Skordilis (born 1987), Greek basketball player
