= Makarios (painter) =

Greek painter

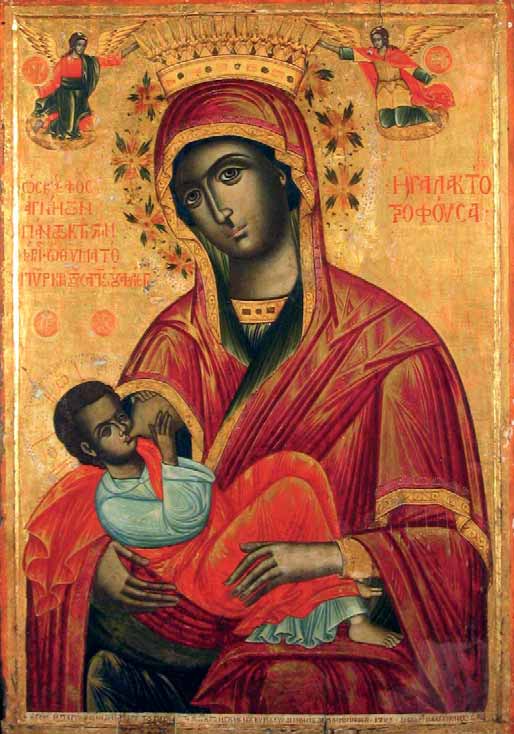
- Galaktotrophousa
- Born: 1760; Galatista, Halkidiki Greece
- Died: 1814 (aged 53–54); Mount Athos, Greece
- Known for: Iconography and hagiography
- Notable work: Galaktotrophousa
- Movement: Greek Romanticism

Makarios (Greek: Μακάριος; 1760 – 1814), also known as Makarios of Galatista, was a member of a family of monks that were active on Mount Athos. He is one of few Greek painters not associated with Italy, Crete, and the Ionian Islands. Makarios and his nephews Veniamin, Zakarias, and Giorgios painted frescos at the historic monastery complex. Other notable Greek painters associated with the monastery were Theophanes the Cretan and Fragkos Katelanos. His style was influenced by existing works on Mount Athos but he was also exposed to the Macedonian Palaeologan Renaissance. Most of Makarios's remaining works are at Mount Athos. His most notable work is the Nursing Madonna or Galaktotrophousa. Another notable Greek painter who painted the Galaktotrophousa was Antonios Papadopoulos.

== History ==
Makarios was born in Galatista, Chalkidiki, Greece, northwest of Mount Athos. He was a monk. He eventually was associated with Mount Athos. Not much is known about his life. His nephews were also painters and monks associated with Mount Athos. The family represented Galatista at the monastery complex. His nephews were Veniamin, Zakarias, and Giorgios.

Makarios traveled to Makrinitsa and painted frescos in the church of Agioi Anargyroi in 1778. Regrettably, the church was destroyed in the earthquakes in 1955. The first record of the painter on Mount Athos was 1786. He continued to work at the monastery complex for the remainder of his life. He signed some of his works with his nephews Girogios, Veniamin, and Zakarias.

His nephew Veniamin was recorded as the leader of the entourage from Galatista, Chalkidiki at Mount Athos. Makarios's last record work was in 1814. He died on Mount Athos. One of his signature poems was άνιστορήθη ή παρούσα τράπεζα διά χειρός καί επιμελείας Μακαρίου μονάχου του εκ Γαλατζίστας (presented is the work curated by the hand of Makarios, a monk from Galatista).

== Notable works ==
- Agia Trapeza Vatopedi, Mount Athos, Greece
- Story's of Saint Demetrios 1806 Vatopedi, Mount Athos, Greece

== See also ==
- Emmanuel Tzanfournaris
- Christodoulos Kalergis
- Thomas Bathas
- Defterevon Sifnios

== Bibliography ==
- Hatzidakis, Manolis (1987). Greek painters after the fall (1450-1830) Volume A. Athens, GR: Center for Modern Greek Studies E.I.E.
- Hatzidakis, Manolis & Drakopoulou, Eugenia (1997). Greek painters after the fall (1450-1830) Volume B. Athens, GR: Center for Modern Greek Studies E.I.E.
- Drakopoulou, Eugenia (2010). Greek painters after the fall (1450-1830) Volume C. Athens, GR: Center for Modern Greek Studies E.I.E.
