= Ioannis Skordilis =

Greek painter

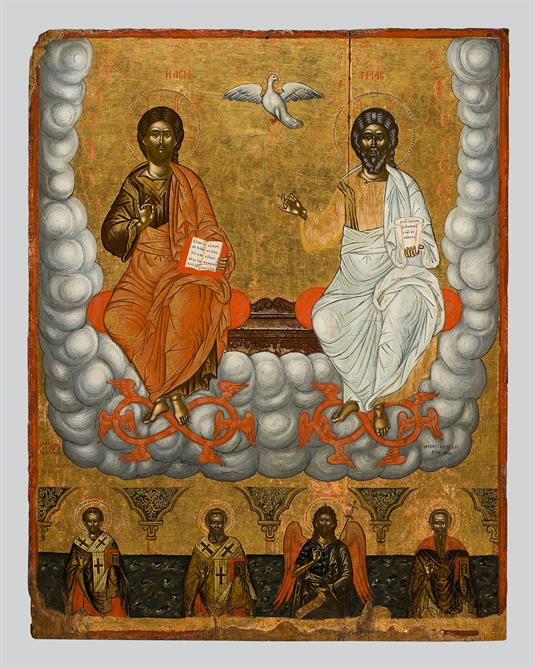
- Holy Trinity with Saints
- Born: 1690; Milos, Ottoman Empire
- Died: 1750 (aged 59–60); Milos, Ottoman Empire
- Movement: Greek Rococo; Modern Greek Enlightenment
- Occupation: Painter
- Years active: 1711-1740
- Era: 18th Century
- Style: Maniera Greca

Ioannis Skordilis (Greek: Ιωάννης Σκορδίλης; 1690–1750) was a Greek painter, active on the Cycladic islands. He shared the same last name as Antonios Skordilis and Emmanuel Skordilis. The family originally came from Crete. They were probably related. Skordilis was a prominent name associated with Cretan painting since the 1500s. Other notable painters of the Cycladic Islands were Christodoulos Kalergis, and Defterevon Sifnios. Twelve of his works survived. They are mainly on the Cycladic islands. His most notable work is at the Byzantine and Christian Museum. It is called the Holy Trinity and Saints. The piece is similar to a work completed by Emmanuel Tzanes; it was a common theme among Greek painters.

== History ==
Ioannis was born on the island of Mylos. The family originally came from Crete. Antonios Skordilis and Emmanuel Skordilis were active all over the Cycladic islands. They were both very wealthy priests. Not much is known about his life, luckily he signed and dated most of his work. He was active between 1711-1740. A large majority of his artwork is on the Cycladic islands namely Tinos, Sifnos, and Kythnos. Most of Ioannis's work is a reflection of the traditional Greek mannerisms prevalent at the time. The Holy Trinity with the Saints Eleftherios, Athanasios, Ioannis Prodromos, and Charalambos is an example of the style. The item was painted in 1738. The Dimensions are (88 cm x 70 cm) (2.88714 ft X 2.29659 ft).

Many Cycladic artists began to diverge from the typical Byzantine-Venetian influenced Cretan style. Both Christodoulos Kalergis, and Defterevon Sifnios created works unique to the Cycladic islands. There were enough artists to argue that Cycladic art rivaled both Cretan and Ionian art in reference to the Greek mannerisms prevalent during the era. An example of his signature was χείρ Ιωάννου Σκορδίλη.

== Notable works ==
- John the Baptist (Prodromos) Agios Dimitrios Prefecture, Pyrgos, Tinos, Greece
- Archangel Michael 1712 Metamorphosis, Sikinos, Greece

== Bibliography ==
- Hatzidakis, Manolis (1987). Greek painters after the fall (1450-1830) Volume A. Athens, GR: Center for Modern Greek Studies E.I.E.
- Hatzidakis, Manolis & Drakopoulou, Eugenia (1997). Greek painters after the fall (1450-1830) Volume B. Athens, GR: Center for Modern Greek Studies E.I.E.
- Drakopoulou, Eugenia (2010). Greek painters after the fall (1450-1830) Volume C. Athens, GR: Center for Modern Greek Studies E.I.E.
