= Euphrosynos =

16th-century Greek painter

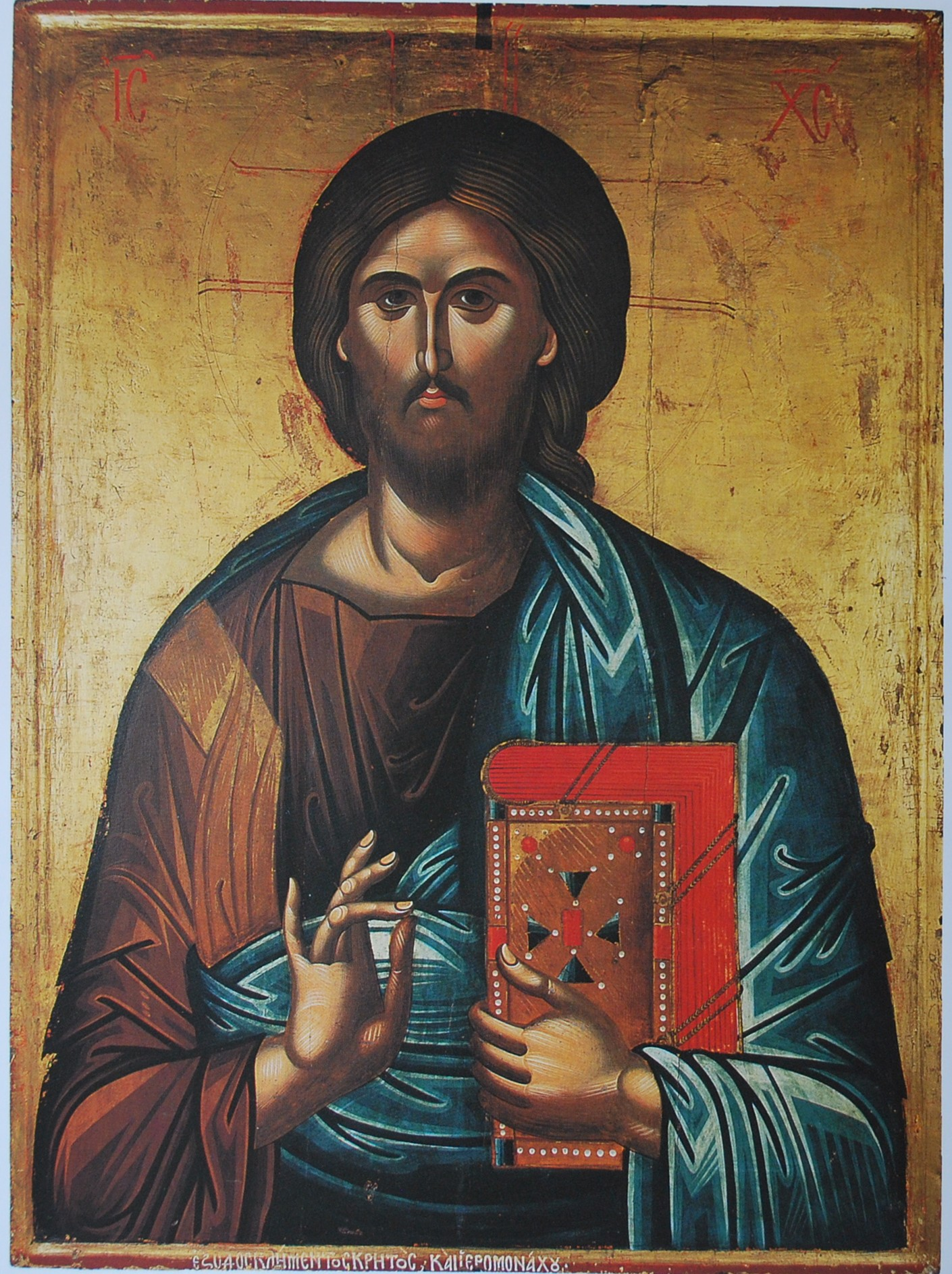
- Icon of Jesus by Euphrosynos
- Born: 16th century Crete, Greece
- Died: 16th century Crete, Greece
- Known for: Iconography and hagiography
- Movement: Cretan school

Euphrosynos (Greek: Ευφρόσυνος; fl. 16th century) was a Greek Renaissance painter. He was a priest and influenced by Byzantine art and the early Cretan school. Five of his works have survived, all of them are in Greece. His technique resembled the works of Andreas Pavias, Angelos Akotantos, and Andreas Ritzos. Euphrosynos may have been a member of the prominent Klontzas family. His paintings of the Virgin Mary and Jesus are typical Cretan school paintings. His Jesus painting resembles Pavias's painting Christ Pantocrator. All of his works are at Mount Athos in the Dionysiou Monastery. They decorate the iconostasis. Fragkos Katelanos and Theophanes the Cretan were also working at Mount Athos around the same period.

== History ==
Euphrosynos was born in Crete sometime in the 16th century. He was a priest. The only information regarding his life remains in five icons. His icons are in the Dionysiou Monastery, Mount Athos, Greece. His style resembles Theophanes the Cretan. There are rumors within the historical community that he was a member of the Klontzas family. In 1567, a priest is mentioned by the name Euphrosynos Klontzas. Regrettably, there is no record indicating that Euphrosynos Klontzas was a painter. His paintings resemble the typical Cretan school. Michael Damaskinos was also active in Crete around the same period. Euphrosynos's paintings are dated around 1542. They are of Jesus, the Virgin Mary, John the Baptist, Peters, and Paul. His signature was Γραφέος θύτου τεΰξεν χείρ ταπεινού Ευφρόσυνου.

== Gallery ==
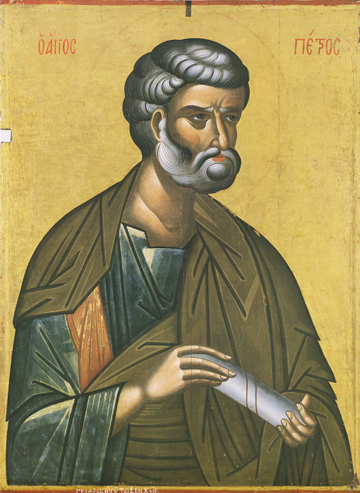
St. Peter

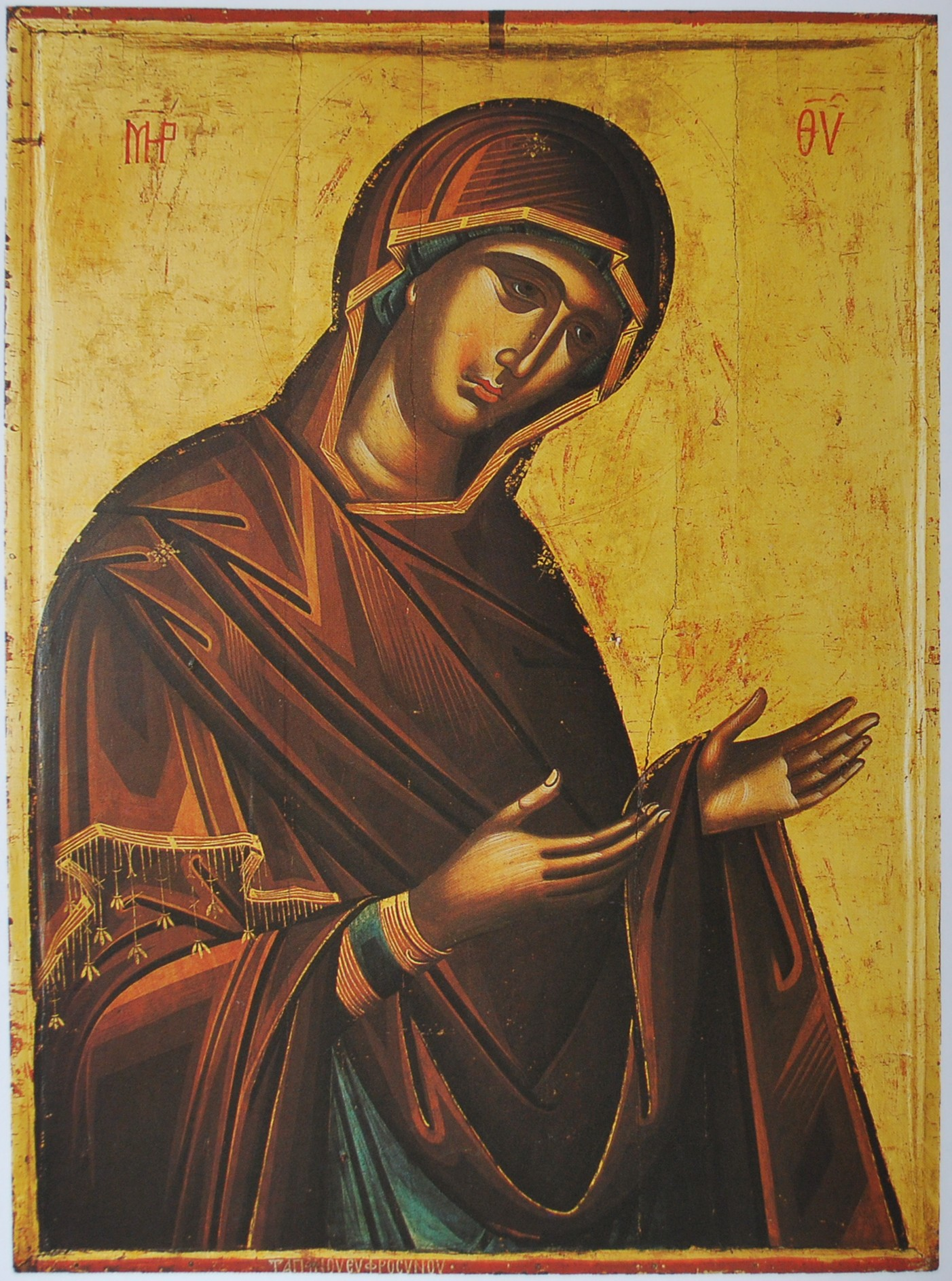
The Virgin Mary

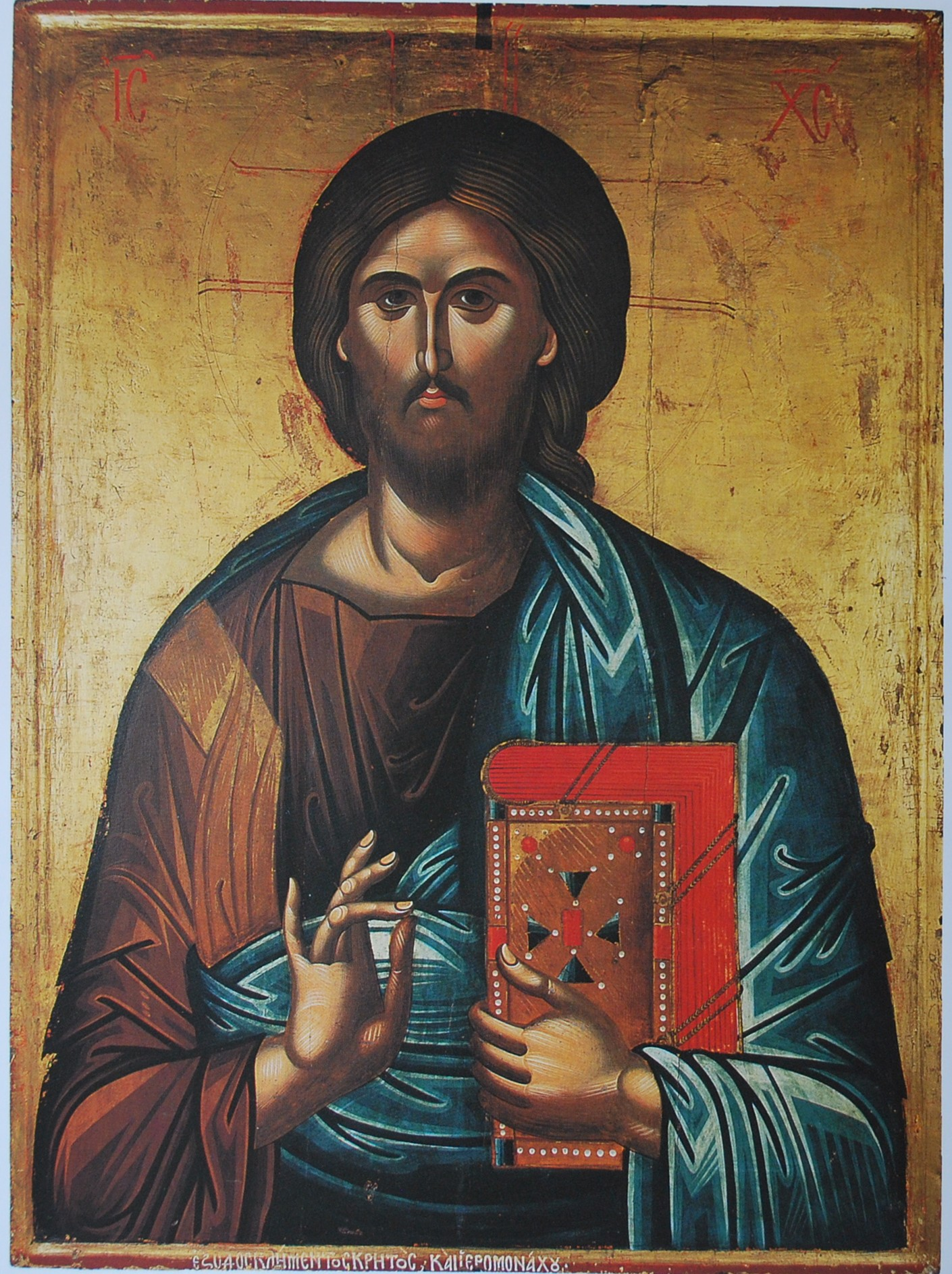
Jesus Christ Pantocrator

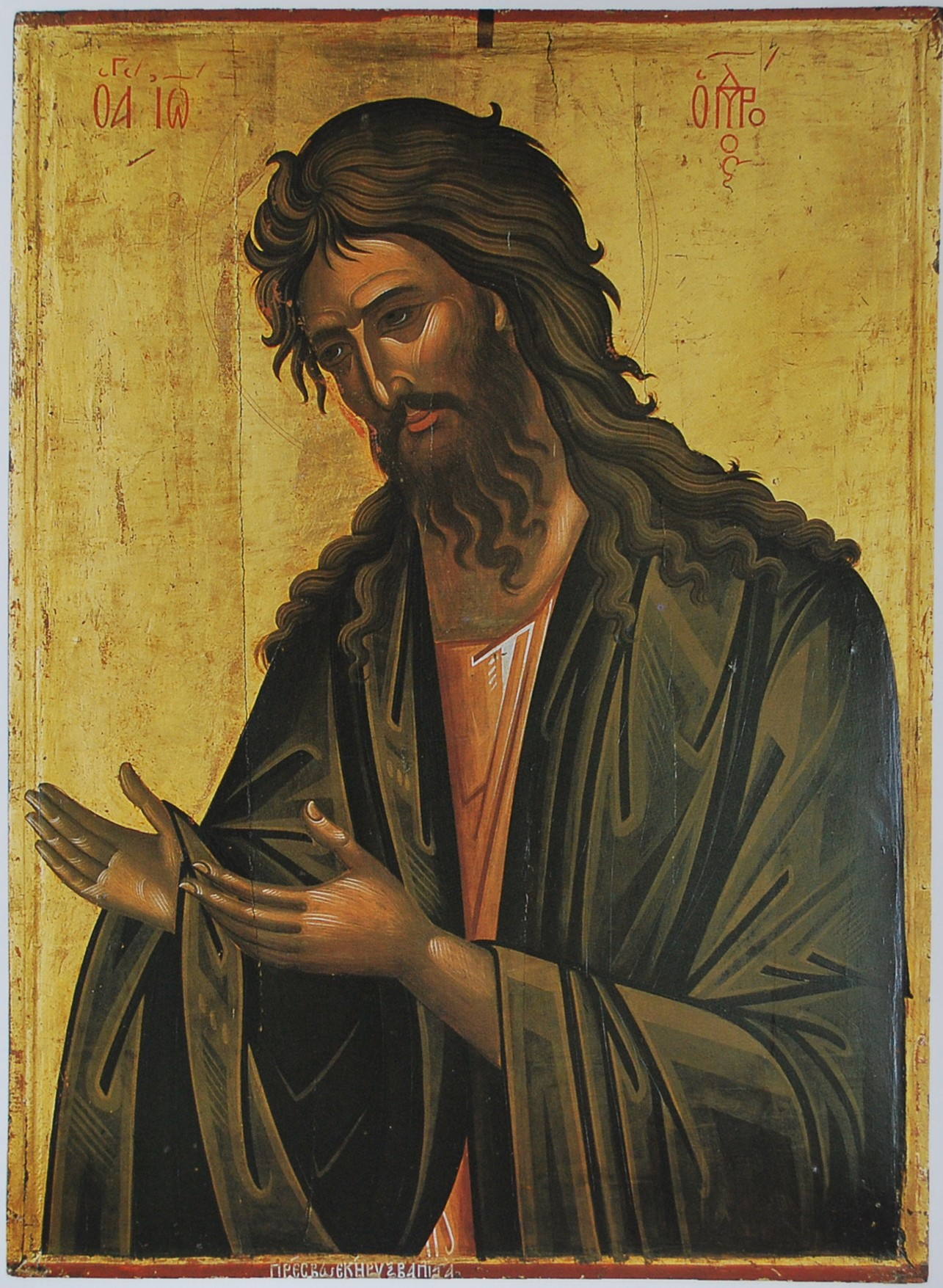
St. John the Baptist

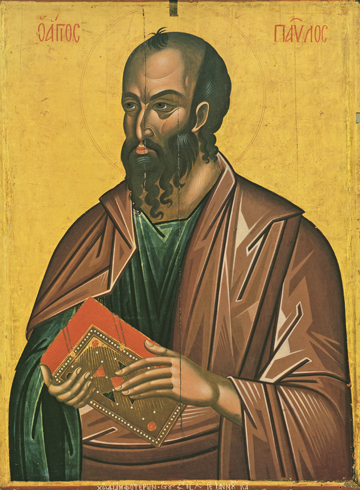
St. Paul
