= Antonios Skordilis =

Greek painter (1654–1731)

- Γεώργιος Κορτεζάς
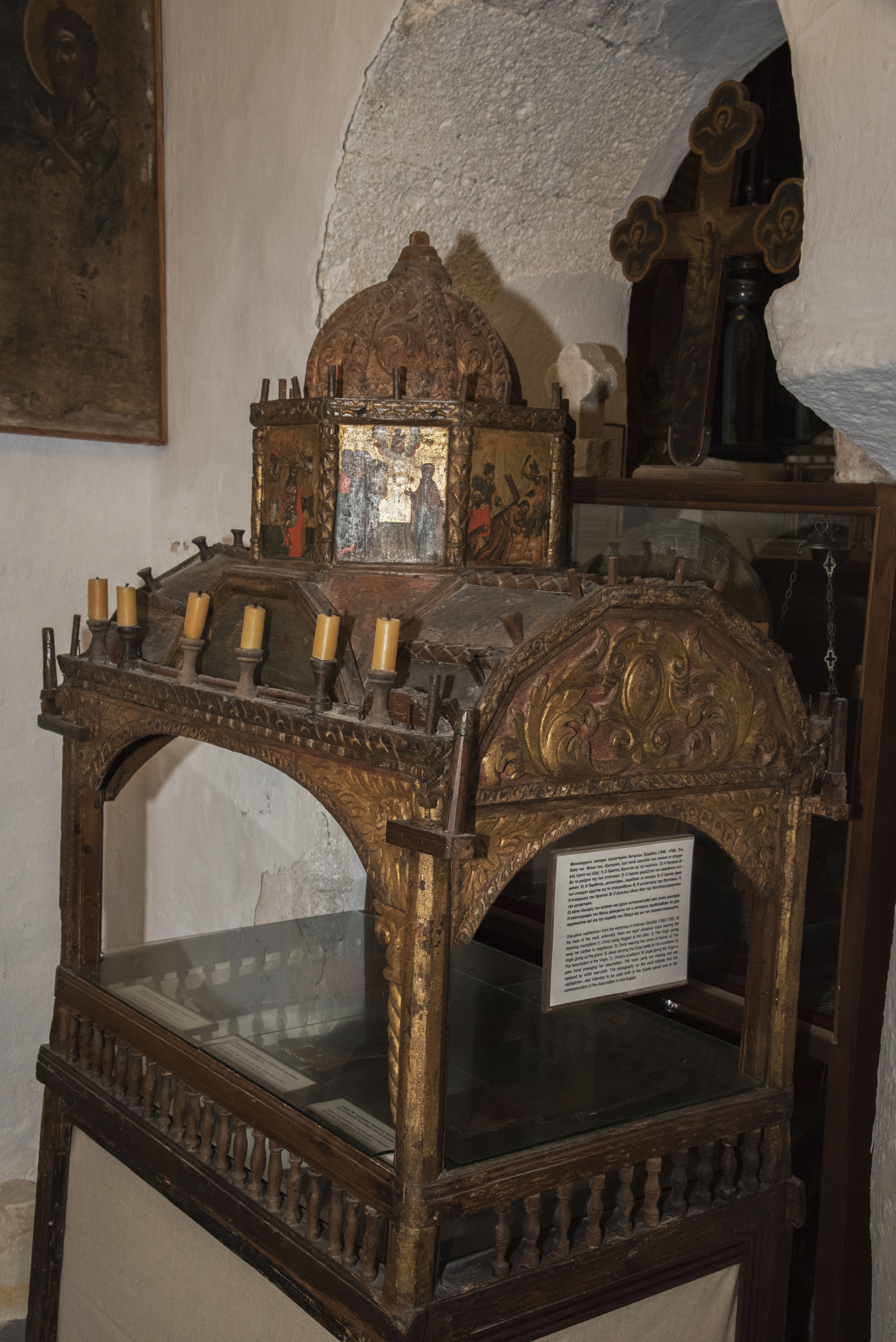
- Painted Epitaphios
- Born: 1654–1660; Kingdom of Candia, Republic of Venice
- Died: 1731; Milos, Ottoman Empire
- Occupation: Painter
- Years active: 1674–1731
- Style: Maniera Greca
- Movement: Greek Βaroque; Greek Rococo; Modern Greek Enlightenment
- Spouse: Touzapias

Antonios Skordilis (Greek: Αντώνιος Σκορδίλης; 1654 – 1731) was a Greek painter. He was active on the Cycladic Islands. Other notable Greek painters active on the islands were Christodoulos Kalergis, Emmanuel Skordilis and Defterevon Sifnios. Emmanuel Skordilis may have been related to Antonios. Antonios represents the Greek baroque and Rococo. The Greek community was undergoing the Modern Greek Enlightenment in art. He followed the typical Greek mannerisms. Both Emmanuel and Antonios influenced local artists namely Defterevon Sifnios. Thirteen of his works survived and two frescos. His remaining frescos are on the Cycladic island Sikinos.

== History ==
Antonios was born on the island of Crete. He left the island from a young age to avoid the war. Another famous Greek painter Emmanuel Skordilis shared the same last name. There is a strong possibility he was his son. He was also active on the Greek Island Milos. Antonios was married. His wife's name was Touzapias or Zabias. He had children and came from a wealthy family. Antonios became a priest. He traveled all over the Cycladic islands painting. He was active on several islands. Some of his surviving frescos are on the island Sikinos. He lived in Palia Chora on the island Milos.

On February 20, 1674, he signed a contract with the holy council of the island Milos. Another document indicates on November 25, 1731, the priest Antonios bequeathed a piece of land to the Patmos Monastery on the island of Milos. According to the document his wife wanted him to donate the land to the Abbot. The document also gives insight about the painter's children. He died shortly thereafter.

== Notable works ==
- Evangelismos ΘΚ 1706 Agios Nikolaos tou Plousiou, Chora Kythnos
- Archangel Michael, 1706 Agios Nikolaos tou Plousiou, Chora Kythnos

== See also ==
- Ioannis Skordilis

== Bibliography ==
- Hatzidakis, Manolis (1987). Greek painters after the fall (1450-1830) Volume A. Athens, GR: Center for Modern Greek Studies E.I.E.
- Hatzidakis, Manolis & Drakopoulou, Eugenia (1997). Greek painters after the fall (1450-1830) Volume B. Athens, GR: Center for Modern Greek Studies E.I.E.
- Drakopoulou, Eugenia (2010). Greek painters after the fall (1450-1830) Volume C. Athens, GR: Center for Modern Greek Studies E.I.E.
