= Georgios Markou =

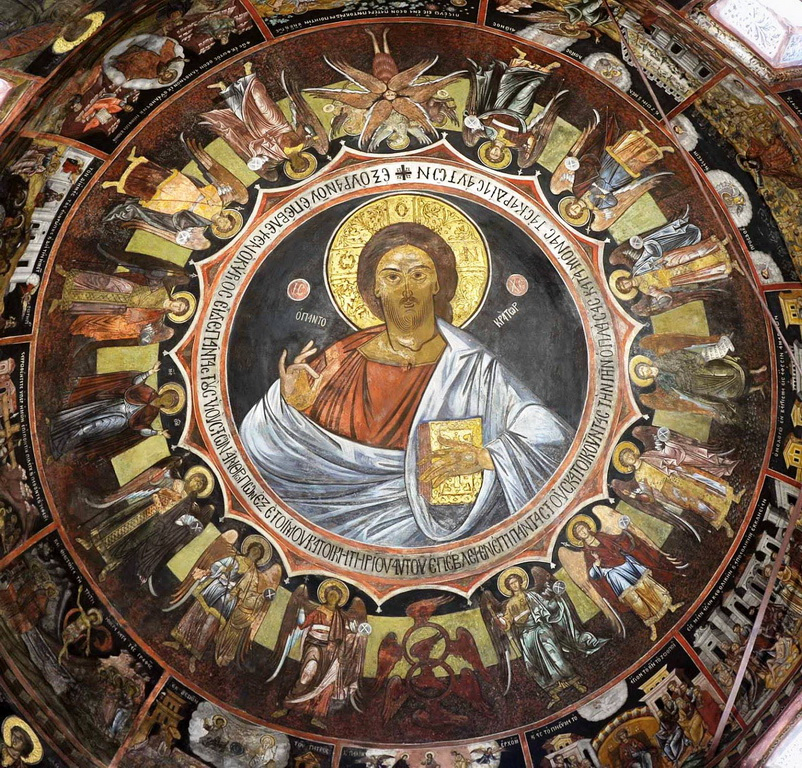
- Pantokrator
- Born: 1690; Argos, Greece
- Died: 1770 (aged 79–80); Athens, Greece
- Known for: Iconography and Fresco Painting
- Notable work: Frescos Monastery Faneromeni, Salamina

Georgios Markou (Greek: Γεώργιος Μάρκου; 1690–1770) also known as Georgios Markou of Argos (Greek: Γεώργιος Μάρκου ο Αργείος. He was a Greek fresco and icon painter. He was active during the Greek Baroque and Rocco periods. He was an artistic representative of the Neo-Hellenikos Diafotismos. He was one of the few Greek painters that worked outside of the Ionian Islands. Other painters that worked outside the Ionian Islands were Christodoulos Kalergis and Makarios. They were also fresco painters. Other Greek fresco painters that traveled all over Greece were Fragkos Katelanos, Theophanes the Cretan, and Frangos Kontaris. Markou was also one of the few prominent painters to have painted in Athens. His surviving works can be found all over the ancient city. He also completed works on the island of Salamina. Three icons survived and countless frescos exist at seven different sites. Some of the frescos are in very good condition. His most notable frescos are at the Monastery Faneromeni, Salamina, Greece.

== History ==
Markou was born in Argos. He worked with his brother Antonios. Not much is known about his life except for the massive number of frescos that survived in the region of Athens, Greece. In the period spanning 1719-20 he traveled to Mount Athos for research and study of the "Palaeologan renaissance " in Byzantine Hagiography. He also traveled to Venice where he had an opportunity to experience the art trends of the Renaissance. The first archive of the artist began in 1719, at the Petraki Monastery in Athens, Greece. The next church he frescoed was in 1727. The name of the church was Iera Sketi Agio Timotheo, Gerakas. He conducted a service in honor of Peter the Wonderworker of Argos and Nafplio in 1729.

In 1732, he was back in Athens. Markou frescoed the church of Kimisis tis Theotokou in Koropi, Athens. By the year 1735, he completed his most impressive work on the island of Salamína. He frescoed the Faneromeni Monastery. Six years later he completed more frescos in Athens. He worked in the church of Agia Paraskevi at Markopoulo. The church (old cathedral) of St.John Chrysostom in Kamarthi, hagiographed some time after 1735 (Paeanea-Mesogeia). His final works were recorded in the 1740s at Kouvaras, Athens. He completed works in the churches of Agios Georgios and Agios Athanasius. Most of the surviving frescos are in very good condition. The other painters he collaborated with were also recorded. Their names were Nikolaos Benizelos, Georgios Kypriotis, and Dimitrios. Local legend states that he was buried in the cemetery courtyard of the Church of Agia Paraskevi Markopoulou.

He is one of the most notable fresco painters of his time. He influenced countless Greek painters. His artwork is one of the most important monuments of 18th-century Greek culture. His work is significant because it was completed outside of the Ionian Islands and the Venetian Empire. His work may have been influenced by Venetian art because he traveled to Venice and the Ionian Islands. Another notable artist from the Peloponnese region who completed countless frescos was Christodoulos Kalergis. He was active during the same period.

== Gallery ==
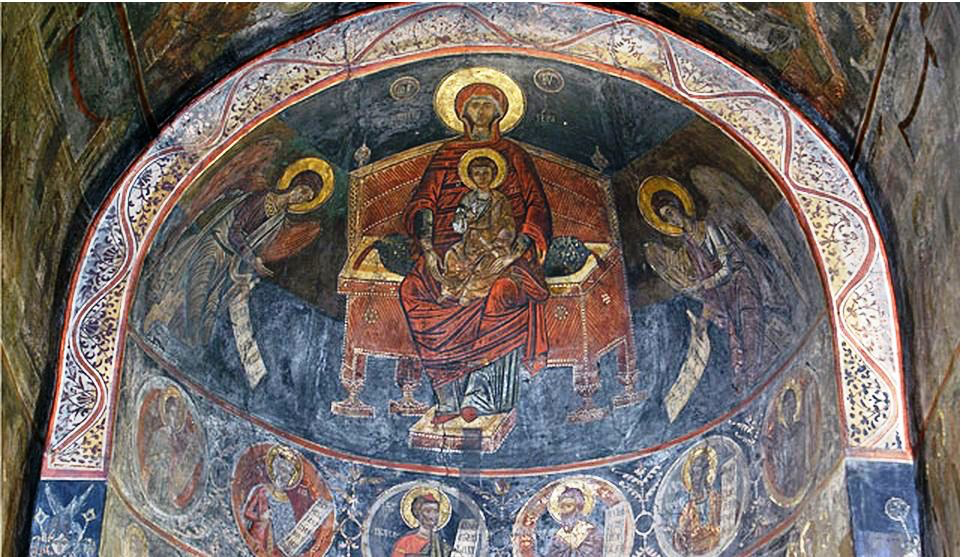
Our Lady of the Sign (Platitera) Πλατυτέρα

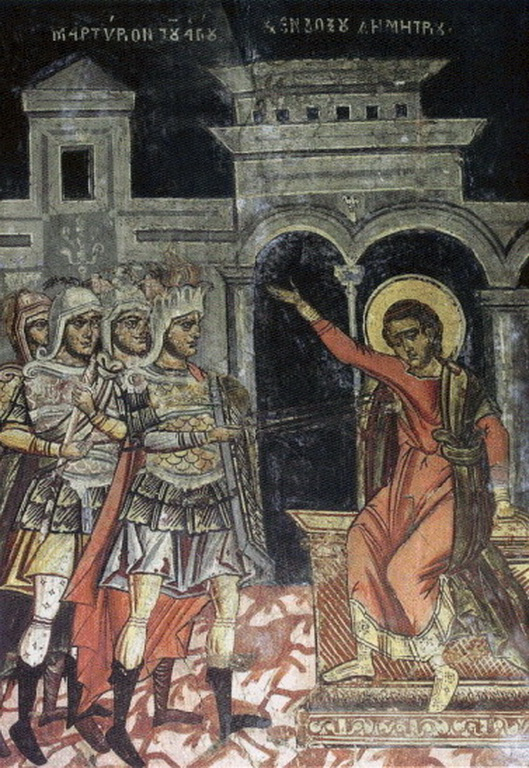
The Sacrifice of Saint Demetrios

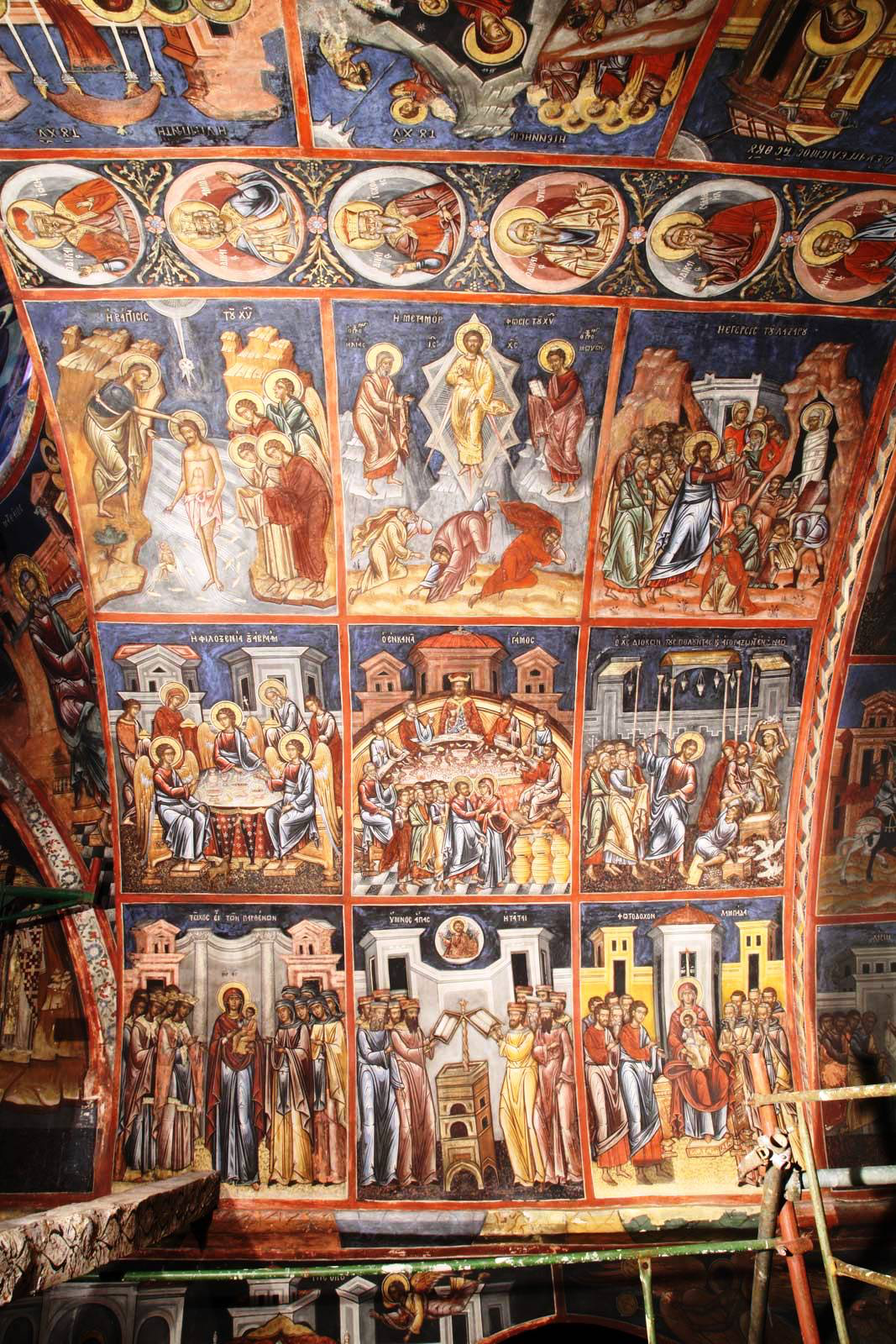
Georgios Markou Scenes from the Life of Christ

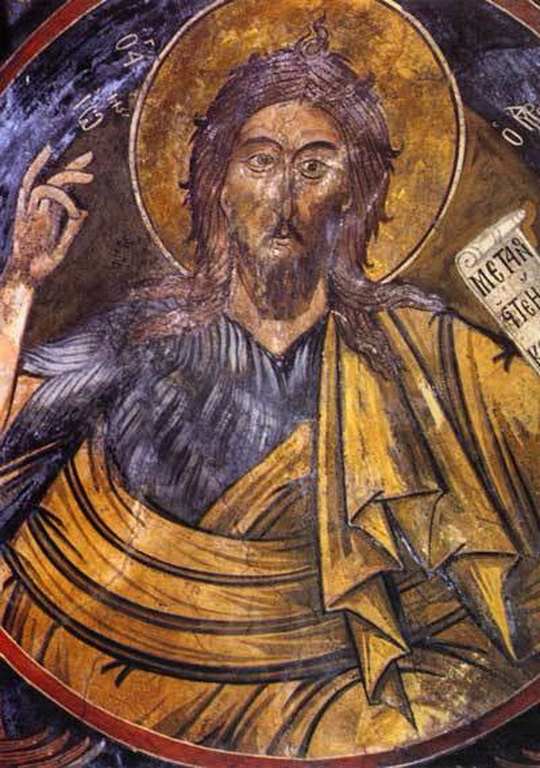
John the Baptist

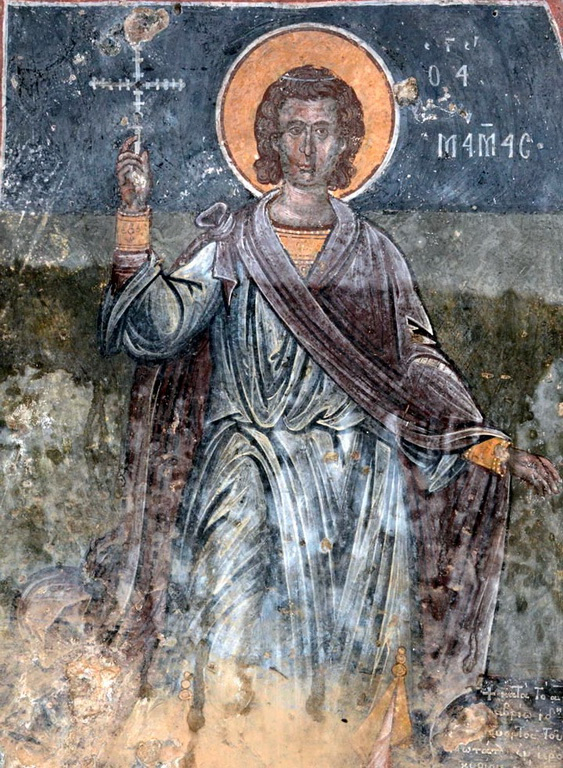
Agios Mamas

== Notable works ==
- Frescos 1719 Petraki Monastery Athens, Greece
- Frescos 1727 Iera Sketi Agio Timotheo, Gerakas, Attiki, Greece

== See also ==
- Nikolaos Philanthropinos
- Georgios Kalliergis

== Bibliography ==
- Evangelos Andreou, Da Peloponneso a Venezia e da Venezia ad Attica: Giorgio Marcou di Argos: la più grande scuola agiografica del diciottesimo (18°) secolo. KET/lib Βιβλιοθήκη Πανεπιστημίου Πειραιά
- Evangelos Andreou, George Markou the Argeius. The greatest school of hagiography in the 18th century. Ed. European Arth Center, 2012 (Ευάγγελος Ανδρέου, Γεώργιος Μάρκου ο Αργείος, Το μέγιστο της αγιογραφίας σχολειό στο 18^{ο} αιώνα]]. Έκδ. Ευρωπαϊκό Κέντρο Τέχνης, 2012)
- Hatzidakis, Manolis (1987). Greek painters after the fall (1450-1830) Volume A. Athens, GR: Center for Modern Greek Studies E.I.E.
- Hatzidakis, Manolis & Drakopoulou, Eugenia (1997). Greek painters after the fall (1450-1830) Volume B. Athens, GR: Center for Modern Greek Studies E.I.E.
- Drakopoulou, Eugenia (2010). Greek painters after the fall (1450-1830) Volume C. Athens, GR: Center for Modern Greek Studies E.I.E.
