= Phaneromeni Monastery, Salamis =

Greek Orthodox monastery

Phaneromeni Monastery
- Μονή Φανερωμένης
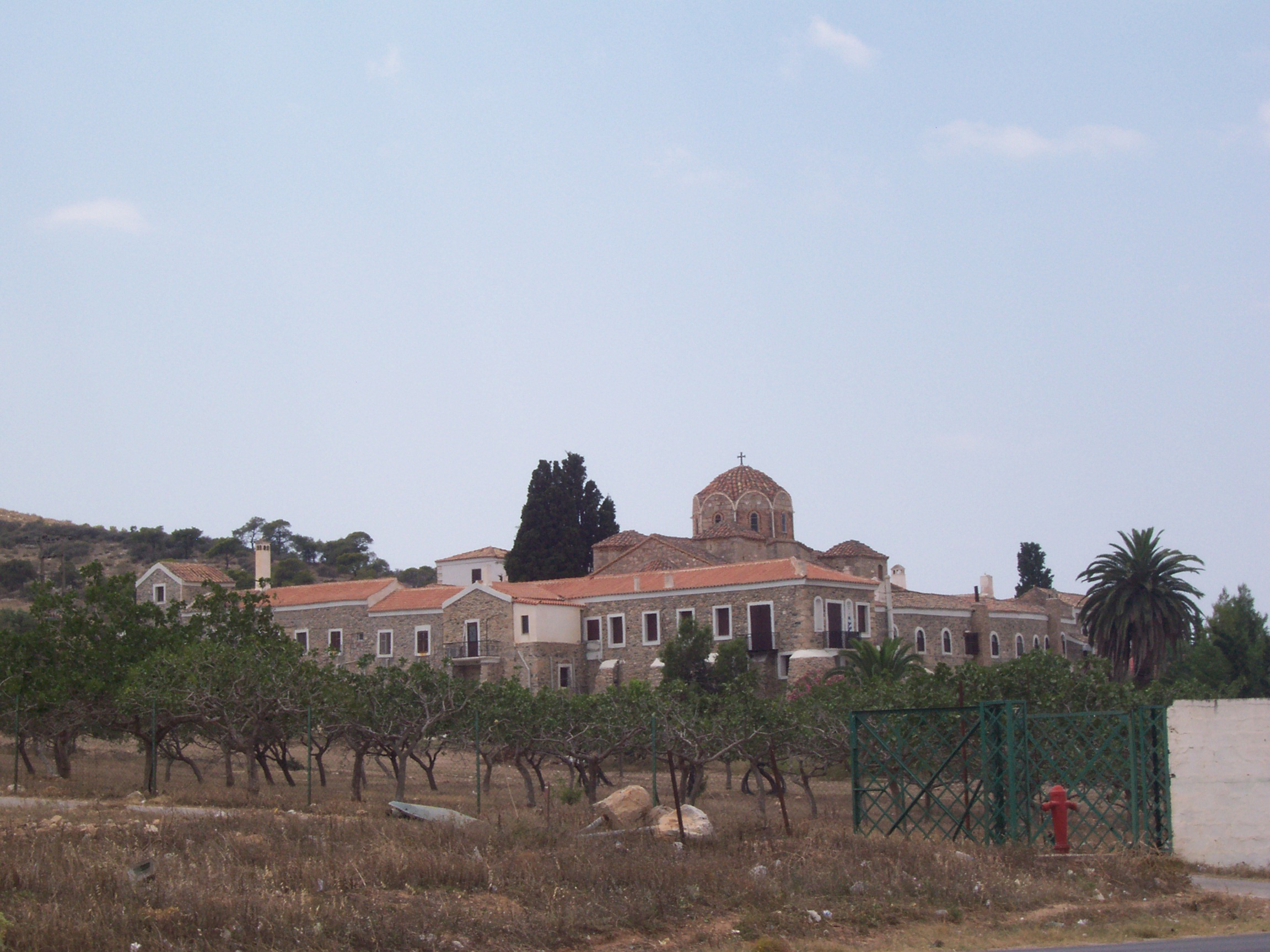
- Interactive map of Phaneromeni Monastery

Monastery information
- Established: 1682
- Dedicated to: Dormition of the Theotokos
- Celebration date: August 23
- Diocese: Metropolis of Megara and Salamis

Site
- Location: Salamis
- Country: Greece
- Coordinates: 37°59′1″N 23°26′9″E

The Holy Monastery of Phaneromeni (Greek: Ιερά Μονή Φανερωμένης) is a historic monastery located on the north-western coast of the island of Salamis in which there was a very old and semi-ruined Christian church in which an icon of the Theotokos was found by Lambros Kannelos, who built and monasticized in the monastery to be canonized by the Orthodox church named Osios Lavrentios. It belongs ecclesiastically to the Holy Metropolis of Megara and Salamis and dedicated to the Dormition of the Theotokos and celebrates on August 23.

== History ==
The founder of the Monastery is Lambros Kannelos, a devout Christian and resident of Megara. According to church tradition, he saw in his sleep three times the Panagia who ordered him to go to Salamis, he dug in the ruins and found the icon of the Panagia Paneromeni. In 1682 he restored the church and founded a monastery on the spot. He himself became a monk together with his wife, was renamed Lavrentios and retired to the hermitage of the prophet Elias, southeast of the monastery, a small church that was preserved intact until 1944 when it was destroyed by the Germans. Lavrentios died on March 6, 1707, and was buried in the monastery. The Church of Greece declared him Blessed, celebrating his memory on March 7. A large number of miracles are attributed to Osios Lavrentios by the faithful.

The Catholicon of the Phaneromeni Monastery was then decorated with hagiographies of post-Byzantine art that survive and date from the year 1735 by the hagiographer from Argos, Georgios Markou and his students. The iconography of the Holy Monastery of Phaneromeni includes approximately 3,530 figures and representations. A significant number of old documents and historical relics are preserved in the monastery.

== Sources ==
- Θ. Παντελή, Σαλαμίνα. Πορεία μέσα στο χρόνο, Εκδόσεις Ιωλκός, 2003, σσ. 151–155
- Μιχαήλ Γκητάκου, Η Μονή Φανερωμένης Σαλαμίνας, Εκδ. Ιερά Μητρόπολις Μεγάρων και Σαλαμίνος, Αθήνα 1981.
- Ειρήνη Ροκίδη, Η μονή Φανερωμένης Σαλαμίνας, Περιοδικό Έρευνα,
- Ευγενία Σοφρά-Μάθεση, Λαυρέντιος ο Μεγαρεύς και το μοναστήρι της Φανερωμένης Σαλαμίνας, εκδόσεις Ευεργετίς-Σταμούλη, Μέγαρα, 2007
- Βελτανισιάν, Παναγιώτης (2018). Η ταυτότητα της Σαλαμίνας από τα τέλη του 17ου αιώνα έως και τα μέσα του 19ου αιώνα: μια ιστορική και λαογραφική προσέγγιση μέσα από δικαιοπρακτικά έγγραφα αρχείων, προφορικές παραδόσεις, περιηγητικά κείμενα και άλλες πρωτογενείς πηγές. Αθήνα: Εθνικόν και Καποδιστριακόν Πανεπιστήμιον Αθηνών. p. 241,242,244,245,247,552.
- Βλαδίμηρος, Λάζαρος Ε. (2014). Γιατροί και ιατρική στην επανάσταση του 1821. Γλύφα Βαρθολομιού Ηλείας: Εκδόσεις Μπαλτά. ISBN 978-960-99532-7-6.
- Ζαμπέλιος, Σπυρίδων (1852). Άσματα δημοτικά της Ελλάδος. Εν Κερκύρα: Τυπογραφείον "Ερμής" Α. Τερζάκη και Θ. Ρωμαίου. p. 645, αριθμός 58.
- Μπίρης, Μάνος (1989). "Το καθολικό της μονής Φανερωμένης στη Σαλαμίνα". Εκκλησίες μετά την Άλωση, τ. Γ'. pp. 179–88.
