= Defterevon Sifnios =

Greek painter, educator, and monk (1750–1829)

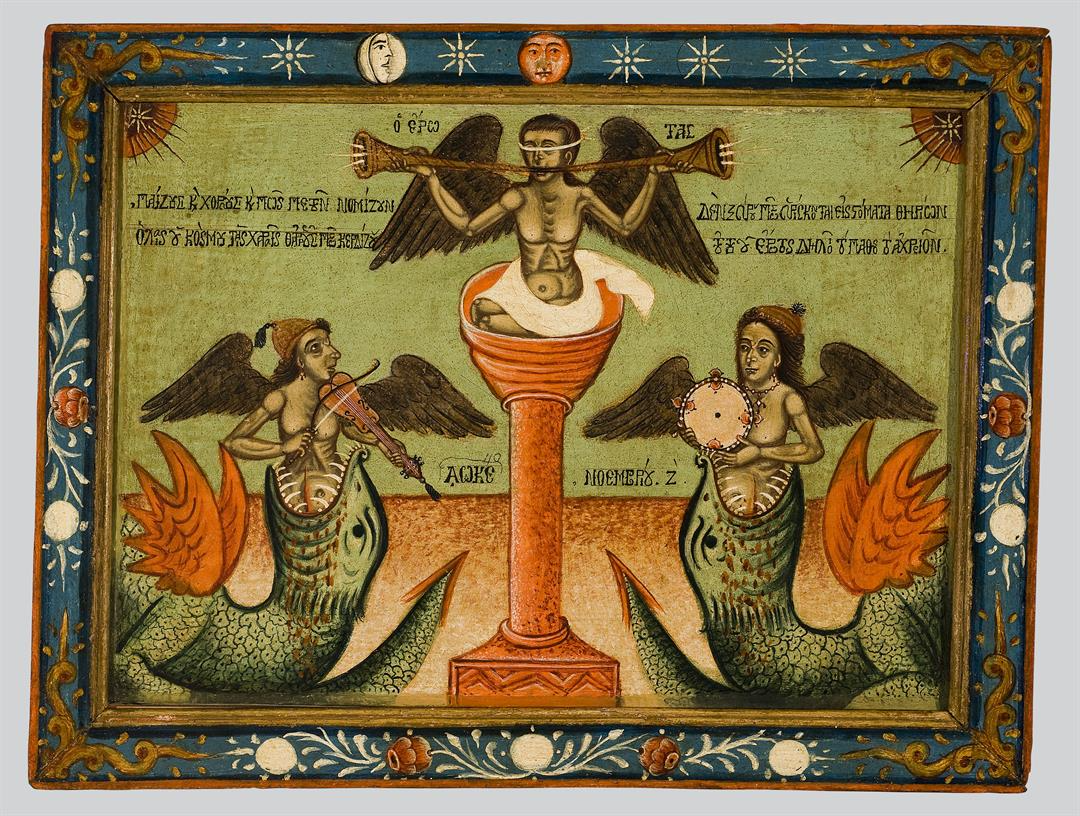
- Musical Eros
- Born: 1750; Sifnos, Greece
- Died: 1829 (aged 78–79); Sifnos, Greece
- Known for: Iconographer and Fresco Painter
- Movement: Greek Neoclassicism; Greek Romanticism; Neo-Hellenikos Diafotismos

Defterevon Sifnios (Greek: Δευτερεύων Σίφνου, 1750 – 1829), also known as Agapios Prokos (Greek: Αγάπιος Πρόκος) and Defterevon of Sifnos. He was a painter, educator, and monk. He was from the island Sifnos, one of the Cyclades. He was one of the few Greek painters not active on the Ionian Islands. Other Greek painters associated with the Cyclades were Christodoulos Kalergis and Emmanuel Skordilis. He was affiliated with Mount Athos, another painter at the monastery complex around the same period was Makarios. Defterevon is a member of the Neo-Hellenikos Diafotismos in art and the Greek Neoclassical and Romantic period. His work leads Greek painting into the Modern Greek art period. His works are predominantly on the Cyclades. The islands are Serifos, Kimolos, Sifnos, and Kythnos. According to the Institute of Neohellenic Research, fifty-four of his paintings survived and two frescos.

== History ==
Defterevon was born on the island of Sifnos. He was from a prominent family. His father's name was Nikolaos Prokos. Nikolaos was a high-ranking judge. Defterevon's original name was Agapios Prokos. Agapios eventually became a priest and painter. He took on the name of his rank in the church Defterevon Sifnios. He was either the second priest to the Protopapas or the head of the deacons. He studied painting at the holy monastery complex of Mount Athos.

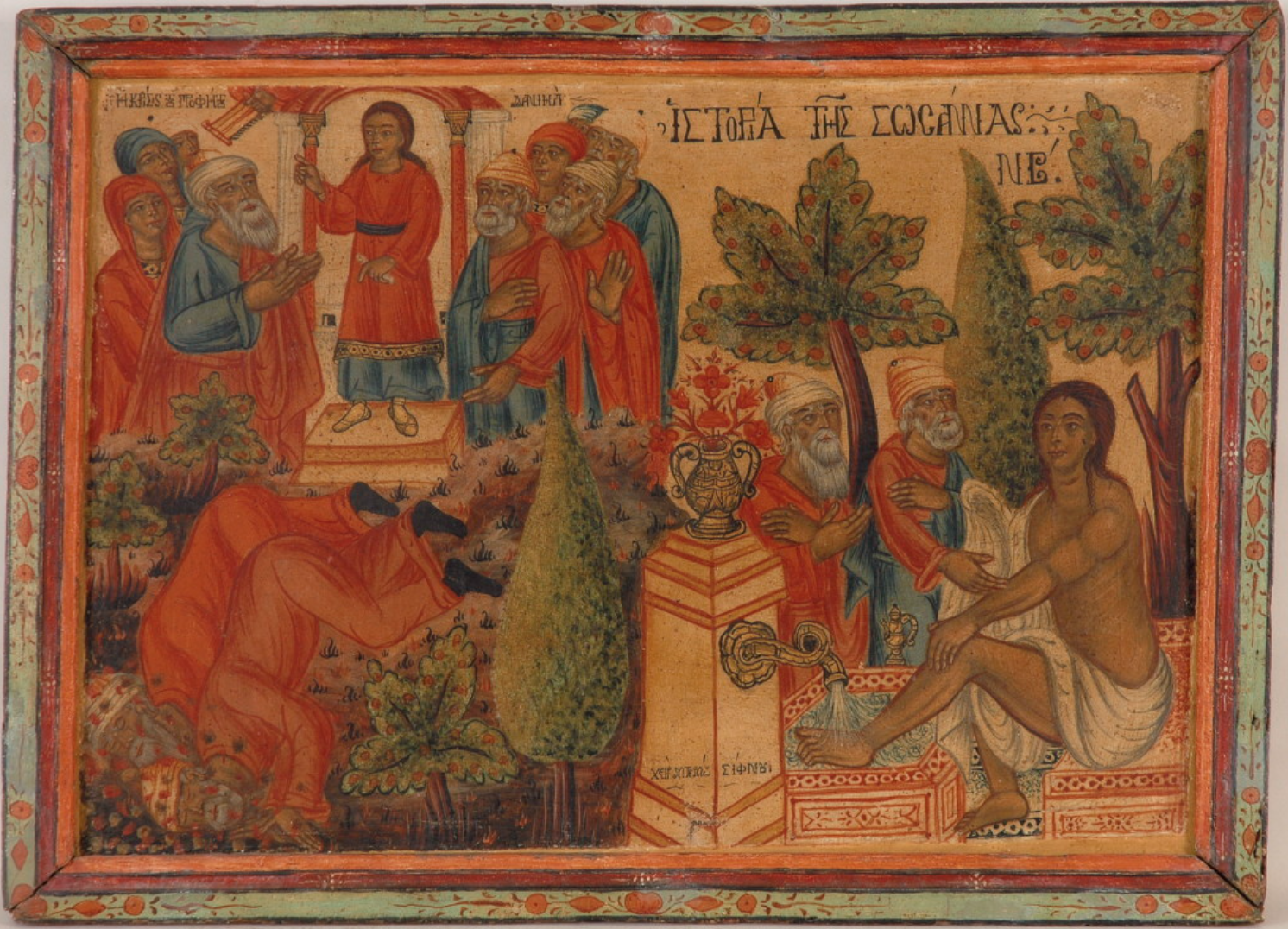
Susanna’s Story

He traveled all over the empire. He eventually joined the Sifnian community in Constantinople. Afterward, he actively painted on the Cyclades.

He worked mainly on the islands of Kimolos and Sifnos. On one of his trips within the Cyclades, he was captured by pirates on his way to Sikinos. Luckily, he had enough money to pay his ransom. The pirates set him free. He decorated murals in his family church of Panagia in Gournia, Sifnos. Information about his family and property were taken from his will and family documents. He was a very famous painter. People traveled from all over the world to study painting with Defterevon. One of his apprentices was Ioannis Oikonomou Afentakis they were together before 1826. In 1821, Sifnos played an important role in the Greek War of Independence. Defterevon died on the island of Sifnos in 1829. His painting of Eros marks a divergence from theological subjects to other genres. His work is a precursor to Modern Greek art.

Defterevon painted a carved wooden Epitaphios. It was in the form of a church. Defterevon decorated the piece with three scenes from the life of the Virgin. The Virgin on Mount Olive, the Dormition, and the Assumption. The wooden Epitaphios came from the church of the Annunciation on the island of Kimolos. It was used for the celebration of the Feast of the Dormition on the 15th of August until the 1850s. The Epitaphios was donated to the Christian Archaeological Society in 1904, by Georgios Logothetis. In 1923, the item became part of the Museum Collection.

== Notable works ==
- Frescos Taxiarchon, Kimolos
- Frescos Panagia in Gournia, Sifnos

== See also ==
- Demetrios Stavrakis
- Georgios Markou

== Bibliography ==
- Hatzidakis, Manolis (1987). Greek painters after the fall (1450-1830) Volume A. Athens, GR: Center for Modern Greek Studies E.I.E.
- Hatzidakis, Manolis & Drakopoulou, Eugenia (1997). Greek painters after the fall (1450-1830) Volume B. Athens, GR: Center for Modern Greek Studies E.I.E.
- Drakopoulou, Eugenia (2010). Greek painters after the fall (1450-1830) Volume C. Athens, GR: Center for Modern Greek Studies E.I.E.
