= Petraki Monastery =

Coordinates: 37.9786°N 23.7492°E

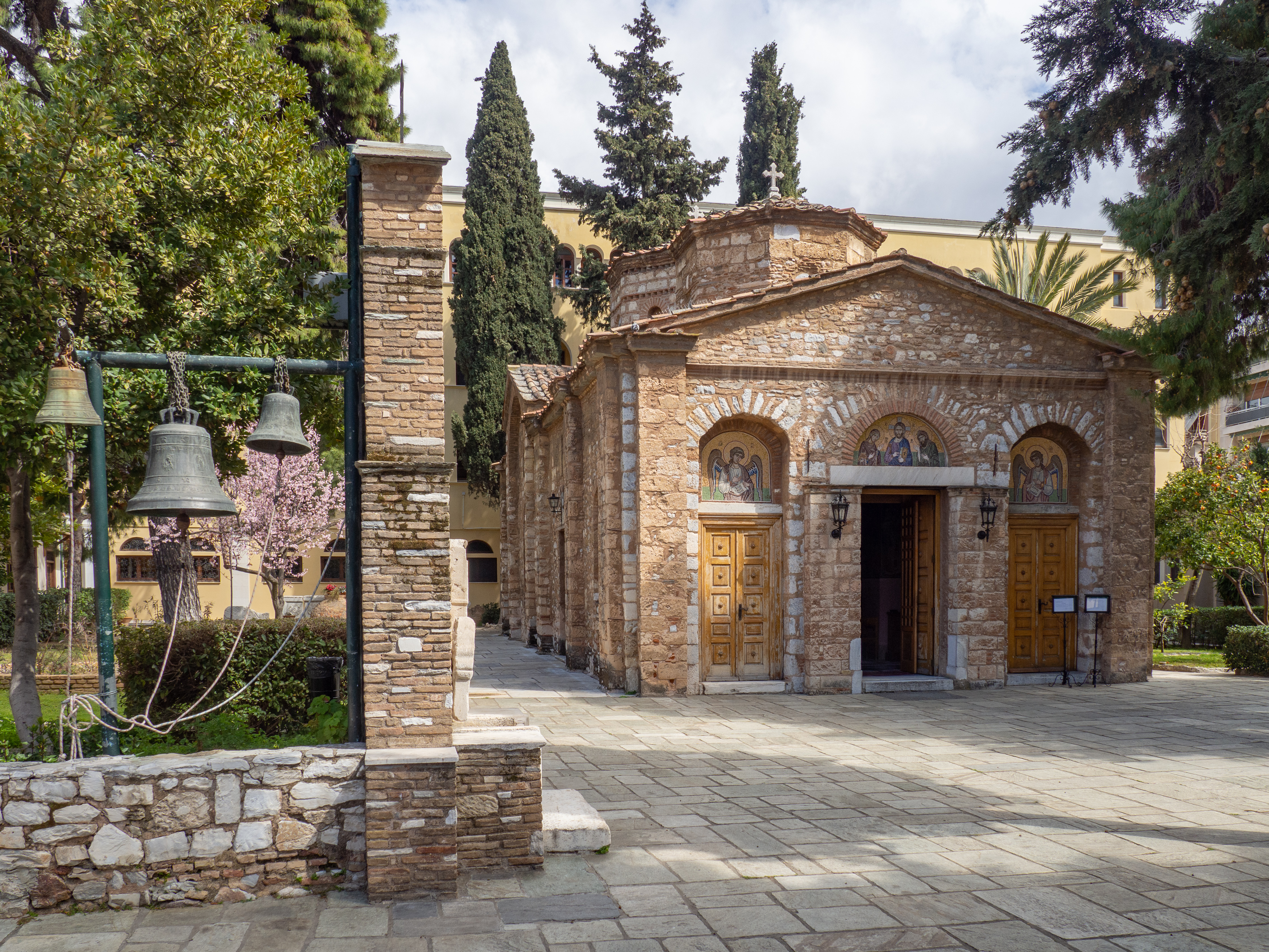
Petraki Monastery

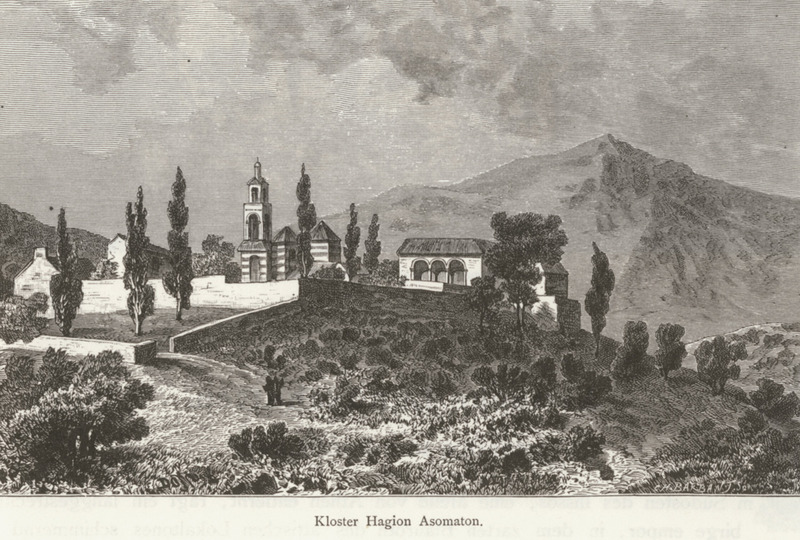
The monastery in the 1880s

The Monastery of the Holy Incorporeal Taxiarchs (Άγιοι Ασώματοι Ταξιάρχες), commonly known as Petraki Monastery (Μονή Πετράκη, "Monastery of Petrakis"), is a Byzantine-era monastery in Kolonaki, Athens. It serves as the seat of the Holy Synod of the Church of Greece.

Although attested for the first time in Ottoman times, the monastery's katholikon, a cross-in-square church of the Constantinopolitan type, dates to the 10th century. It is first attested in the Ottoman period as a stauropegic monastery and a metochion of the Karea Monastery on Mount Hymettus. It was also known as tou Koukoupoule (τοῦ Κουκουπουλῆ), but received its current popular name in 1673, following its renovation by Parthenios Petrakis.

== See also ==
- Georgios Markou

== Sources ==
- Koder, Johannes; Hild, Friedrich (1976). Tabula Imperii Byzantini, Band 1: Hellas und Thessalia (in German). Vienna: Verlag der Österreichischen Akademie der Wissenschaften. ISBN 978-3-7001-0182-6.
- Evangelos Andreou, Da Peloponneso a Venezia e da Venezia ad AtticaTTICA: Giorgio Marcou di Argos: la più grande scuola agiografica del diciottesimo (18°) secolo, Ed.EUARCE Atene 2012
