= Milea, Messenia =

Milea Μηλέα
- Community
- Location within Greece
- Coordinates: 36°50′N 22°21′E
- Country: Greece
- Administrative region: Peloponnese
- Regional unit: Messenia
- Municipality: West Mani
- Municipal unit: Lefktro

Population (2021)
  - Community: 134
- Time zone: UTC+2 (EET)
  - Summer (DST): UTC+3 (EEST)

Milea (Greek: Μηλέα; also Romanized as Miléa, Milia and Miliá) is a village and a community in the municipality of West Mani, Messenia, Greece. The population is 134 (2021 census).
