= Emmanuel Skordilis =

Greek painter (1627/1635 – 1671)

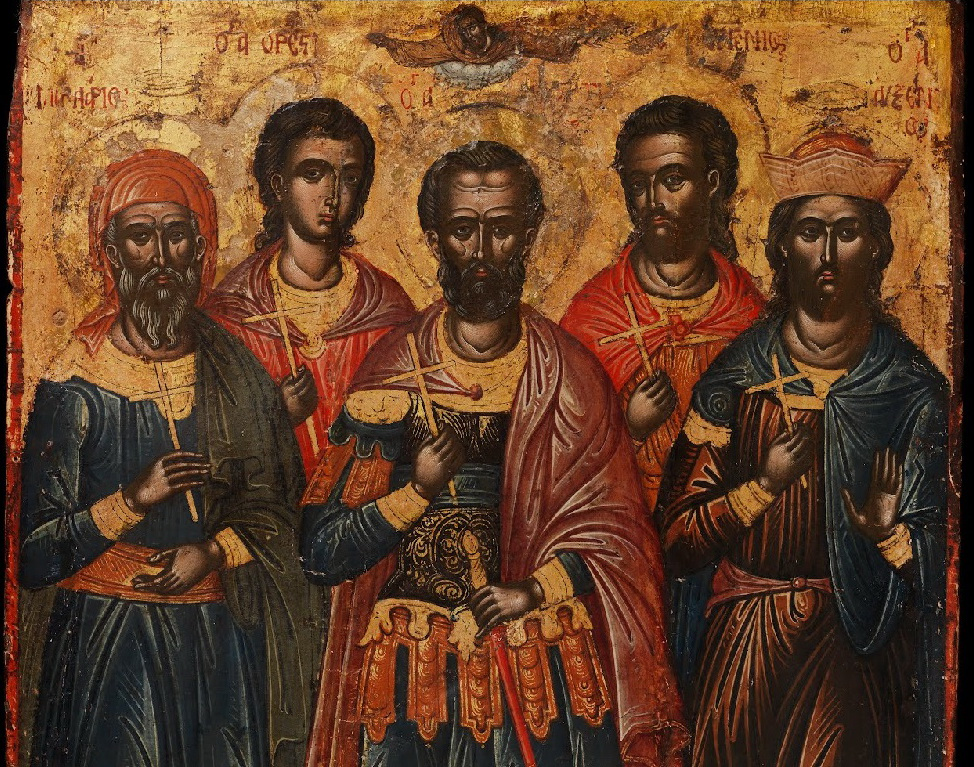
- Five Saints of Sebasteia
- Born: 1627–1635; Heraklion
- Died: 1671; Milos
- Known for: Iconography and hagiography
- Movement: Cretan school

Emmanuel Skordilis (Greek: Εμμανουήλ Σκορδίλης, 1627–1635 – 1671), also known as Emmanouil Skordilis, was a Greek Renaissance painter. He was active in Crete around the time Emmanuel Tzanes, Elias Moskos, and Philotheos Skoufos were painting in Crete. He belongs to the elite group of Greek painters that followed the Venetian-influenced maniera greca in Crete. Sixty eight of his works survived. He is one of few artists to not travel to the Ionian Islands and participate in the Heptanese school. He eventually settled in the Cyclades on the inland of Milos. Christodoulos Kalergis is another prominent Greek artist associated with the Cyclades, he was from Mykonos. Skordilis was influenced by Georgios Klontzas, Michael Damaskinos and Angelos. Skordilis brought the artistic style of Crete to the Cyclades and influenced countless artists in that region.

== History ==
Skordilis was born in Crete. He became a priest on the island. Records indicate he was associated with the Chryssopigi Monastery in Chania. Historians have concluded that he had a personal relationship with the Monastery. Around 1645, when the region fell to the Turks, he traveled to the Cyclades. He eventually settled on the island of Milos after 1647. He painted a significant amount of icons during his lifetime. Historians have records from 1647-1671. One of his signatures was Χείρ Εμμανουήλ ιερέως Σκορδίλη. The last name Skordilis was common in Crete. There were many other painters with the same last name. Cretan priest and painter Antonios Skordilis was also associated with the island Milos.

His art resembles the Cretan school but he further refined the style. Like many of his contemporaries such as Theodore Poulakis and Franghias Kavertzas. Skordilis painted his own version of the historic In Thee Rejoiceth. Many artists created their own version of the piece. Georgios Klontzas’s painting was popular throughout the artistic community. Skordilis also painted the popular Five Saints of Sebasteia. His works can be found all over the world mainly Greece.

== Gallery ==
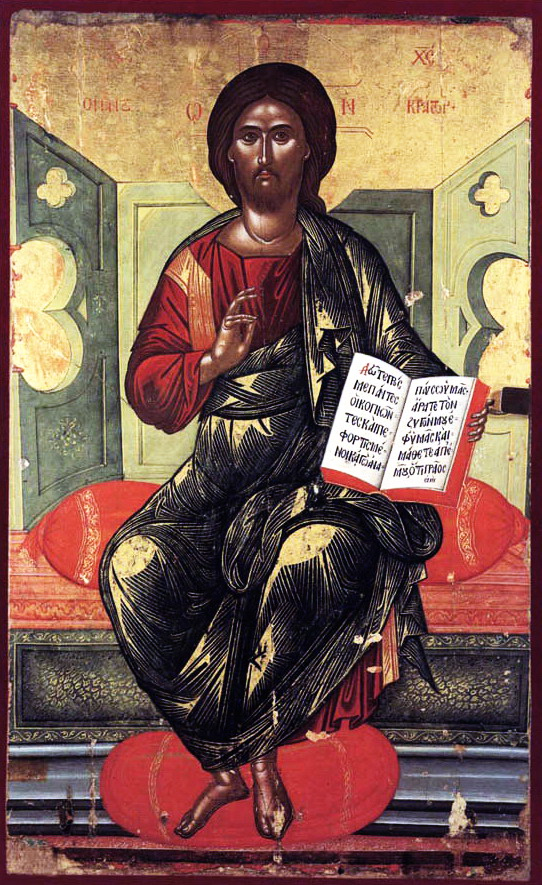
Christ Pantocrator

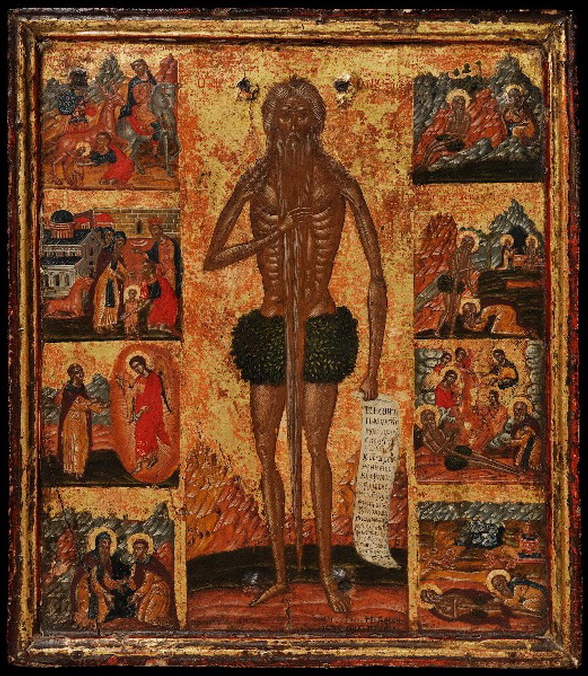
Saint Onouphrios

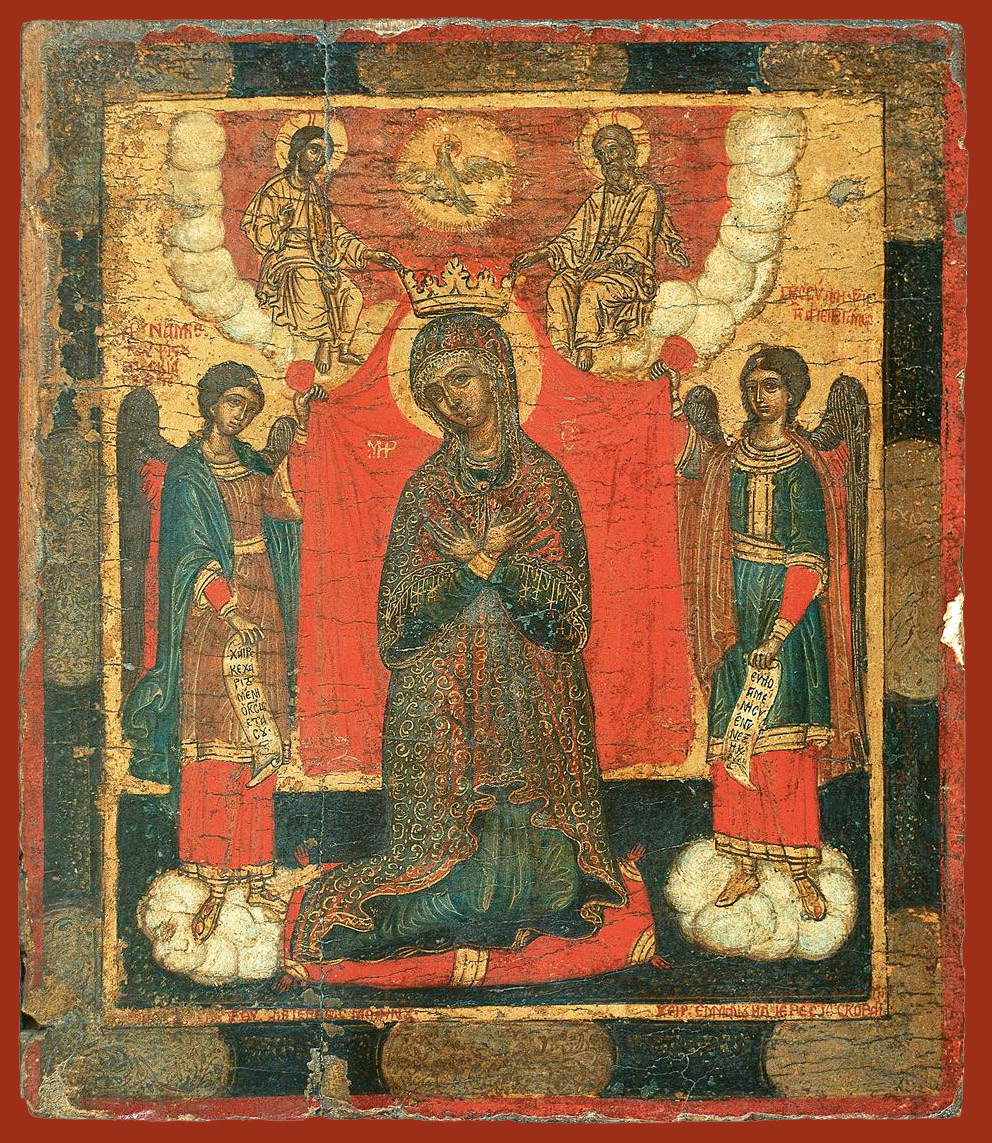
The Coronation of the Virgin

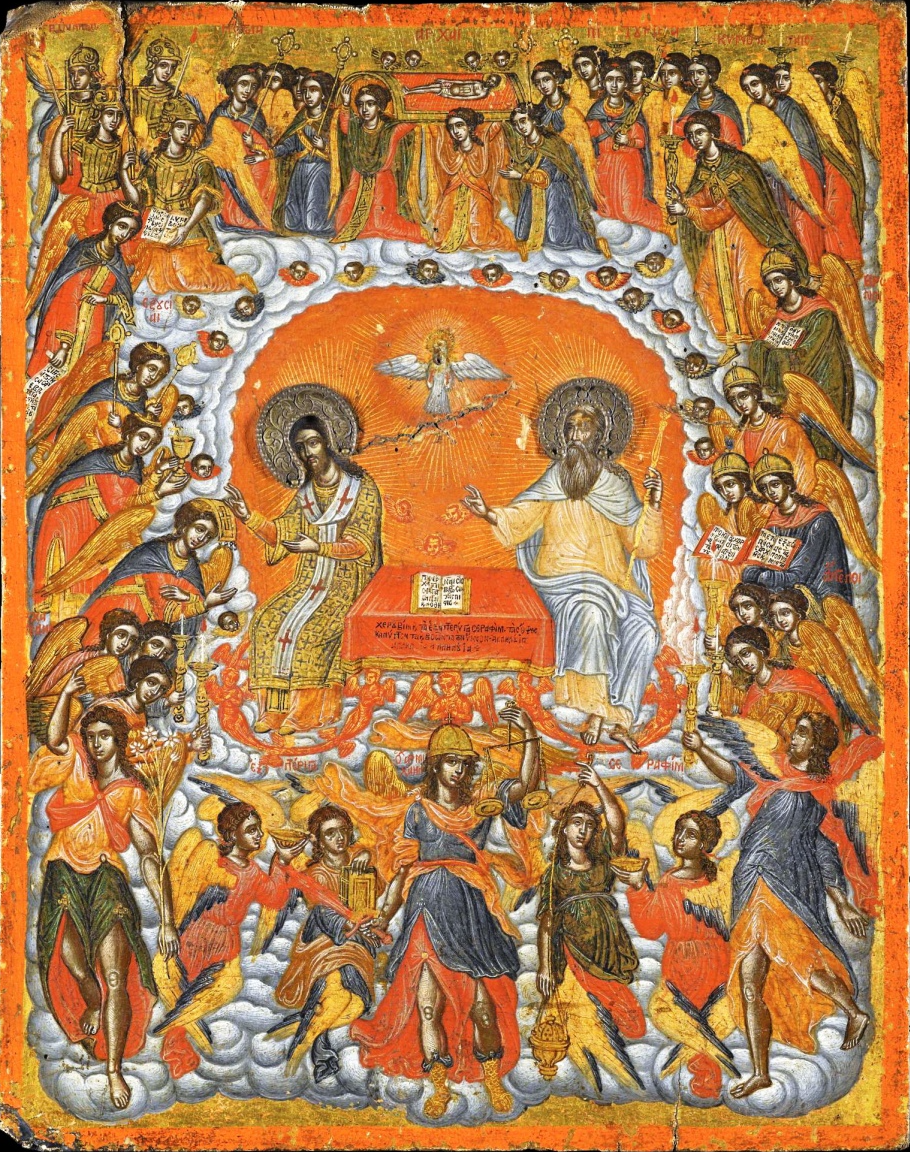
The Divine Liturgy

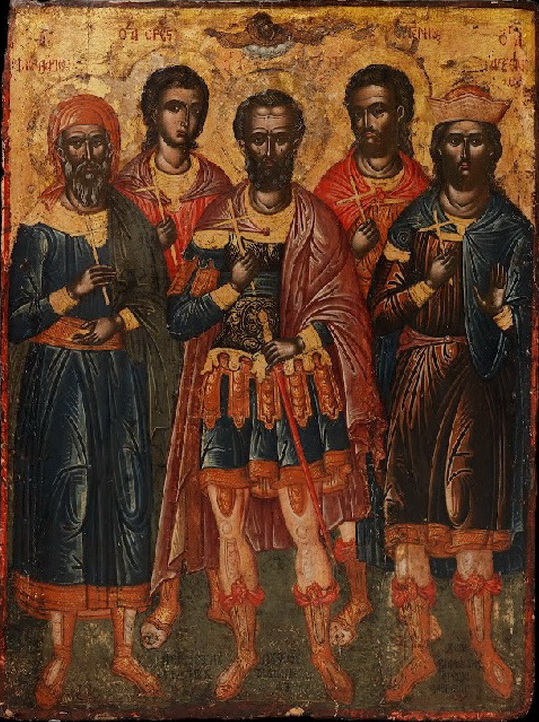
The Five Saints of Sebasteia

== Notable works ==
- In The Rejoiceth Monastery of Panagia Chrysoleontissa in Aegina Greece
- Coronation of the Virgin Byzantine Museum Athens Greece

== See also ==
- Antonio Vassilacchi

== Bibliography ==
- Hatzidakis, Manolis (1987). Greek painters after the fall (1450-1830) Volume A. Athens, GR: Center for Modern Greek Studies E.I.E.
- Hatzidakis, Manolis & Drakopoulou, Eugenia (1997). Greek painters after the fall (1450-1830) Volume B. Athens, GR: Center for Modern Greek Studies E.I.E.
- Drakopoulou, Eugenia (2010). Greek painters after the fall (1450-1830) Volume C. Athens, GR: Center for Modern Greek Studies E.I.E.
