= Theophanes the Cretan =

Icon painter from Crete (died 1559)

Theophanes Bathas
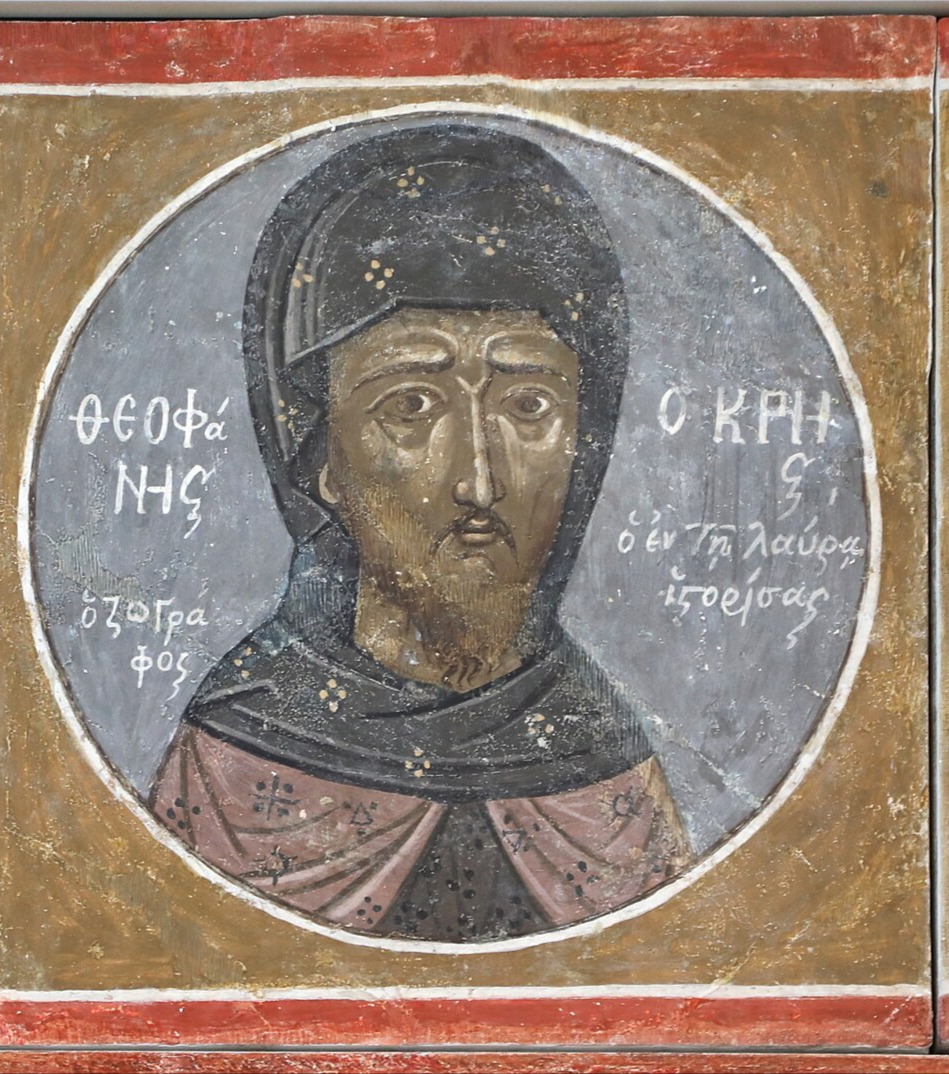
- Fresco by Photis Kontoglou, 20th century
- Born: 1485–1490; Heraklion, Republic of Venice
- Died: 1559; Heraklion, Republic of Venice
- Known for: Painting
- Movement: Cretan school

Theophanis Strelitzas (Greek: Θεοφάνης Στρελίτζας; 1490–1559), also known as Theophanes the Cretan (Θεοφάνης ὁ Κρής, Theofánis o Krís) or Theophanes Bathas (Θεοφάνης Μπαθᾶς), was a Greek painter of icons and frescos in the style of the Cretan school. He passed much of his career as a member of the monastic community of Mount Athos.

Theophanes was part of the artistically prolific Strelitzas-Bathas family, whose members have left over one hundred extant works distributed throughout Greece. His work influenced many later painters, including Fragkos Katelanos and Dionysius of Fourna. Theophanes's son and apprentice Symeon Bathas Strelitzas later became a professional painter in his own right.

== History ==
Theophanes was born in Heraklion, Crete. His family, which originated in the Peloponnesus region, had been associated with painting for over a century. He was married and had two sons, Symeon and Nifos-Neophytos. Sometime before 1527 his wife died young and the family moved to Mount Athos, where Theophanes and his sons became monks and worked as painters.

Theophanes's work was sufficiently esteemed that he received a commission in the Great Lavra, the largest monastery at Mount Athos. He painted frescos in the main building of the complex, a Byzantine church dating back to 1004. The signature of Theophanes can be found in many parts of the building.

In 1536, Theophanes purchased a seat in Great Lavra Monastery for himself and his sons. He made an additional payment in 1540 and received a better location, with a vineyard and orchard. When his children were old enough he purchased the right for them to stay at the monastery with him. He also paid for his funeral in advance. Three years later Theophanes settled in Karyes, the administrative and commercial center of Mount Athos. He exchanged some of his property for a pyrgos, or tower, and meadows with orchards.

Historians believe that Theophanes traveled back and forth to Heraklion, and that he worked as a painter in the Meteora monastery of Saint Nicholas Anapausas and in the Chrysostomou Monastery of Cyprus. By 1552, records indicate he was in Heraklion. He died on February 24, 1559, having amassed a sizable fortune; his will, recorded the same day as his death, gave his two children silver, apartments in Heraklion, gold ducats, and other gold coins dating back to the Byzantine Empire.

The Bathas family was very important in the world of icon painting. The sons of Theophanes continued his legacy. Other relatives active around his lifetime were Markos Bathas, George Bathas, and Thomas Bathas, the last of whom participated in the decoration of the Venetian church of San Giorgio dei Greci.

== Notable works ==
=== Frescos ===
- Narthex of the monastery of Agios Nikolaos, Meteora
- Stavronikita Monastery, Mount Athos
- The Great Lavra Monastery, Mount Athos

=== Icon paintings ===
- Icon of Jesus, Katholikon, the Great Lavra Monastery, Mount Athos
- Icon of Virgin Mary, Katholikon, the Great Lavra Monastery, Mount Athos
- 11 Icons of the Dodekáorto (Twelve feasts of the Eastern Orthodox Church), Katholikon, the Great Lavra Monastery, Mount Athos

== Gallery ==
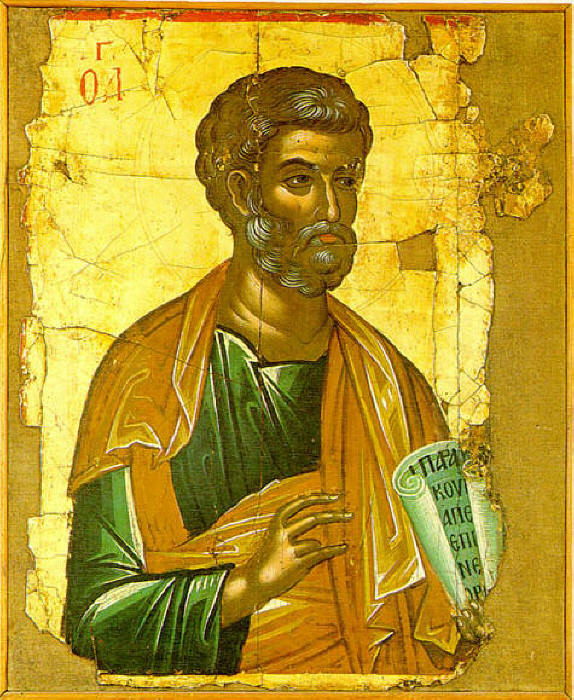
Apostle Peter - Stavronikita monastery, Mt Athos

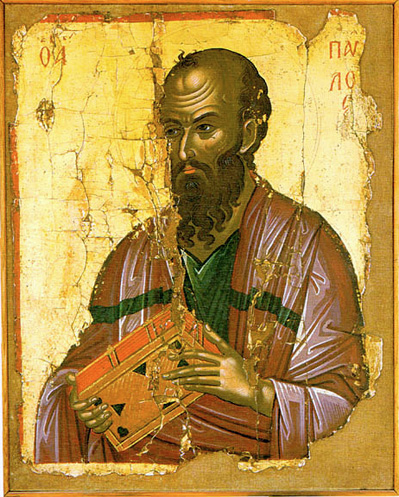
Saint Paul 1546

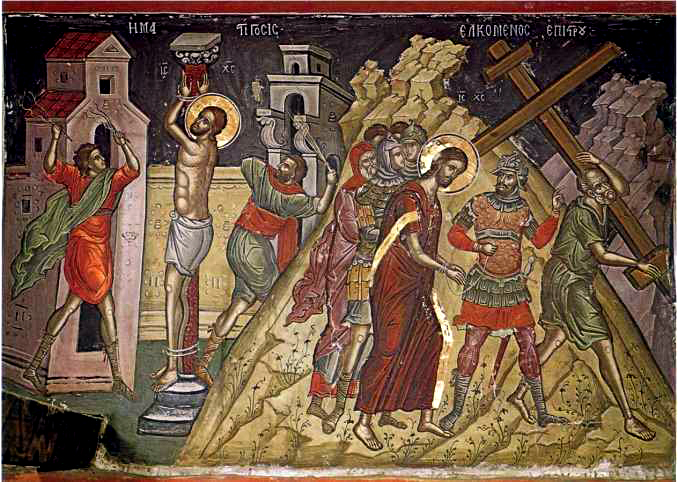
Jesus in Golgotha

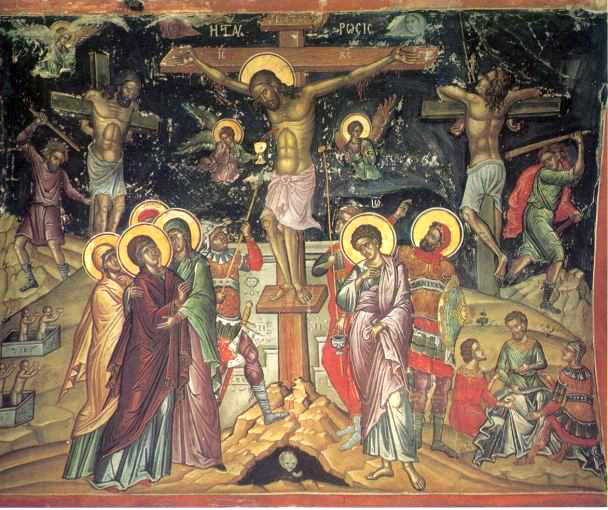
Crucifixion

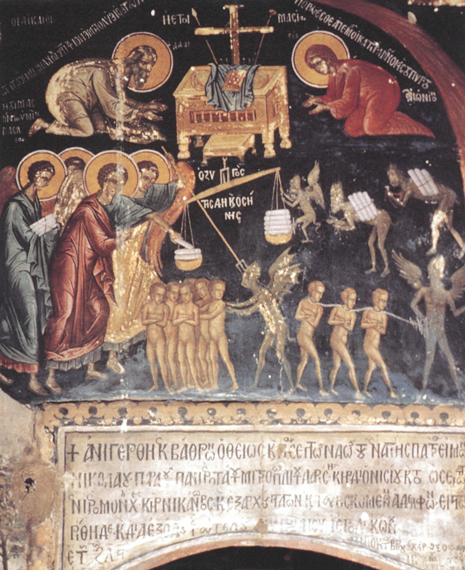
Virgin and Child

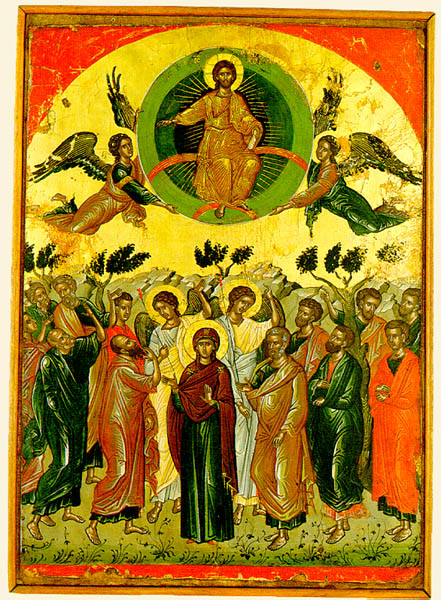
The Ascension 1546

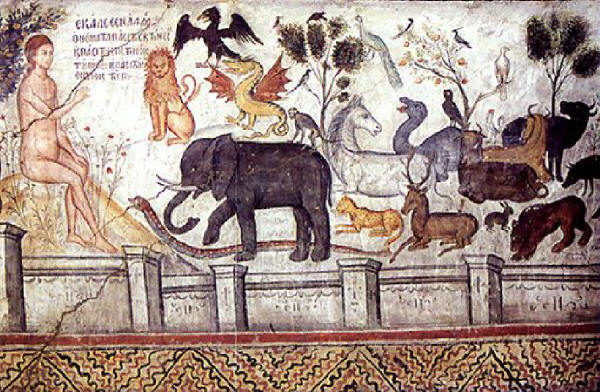
Adam naming the animals

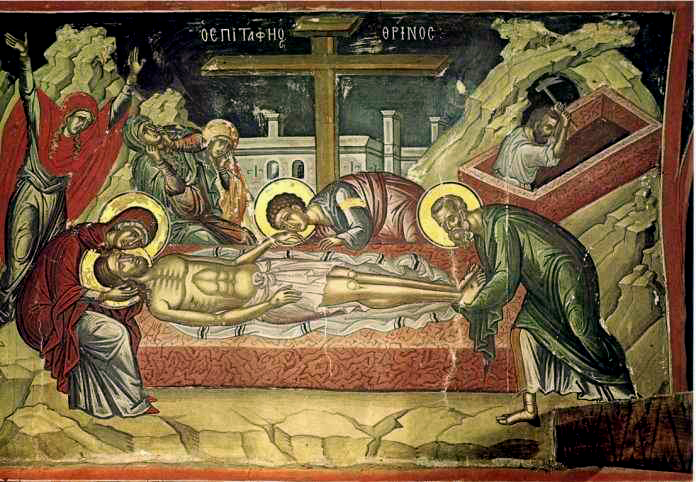
Epitaphios (Lamentation of Christ) from Stavronikita monastery, Mount Athos.

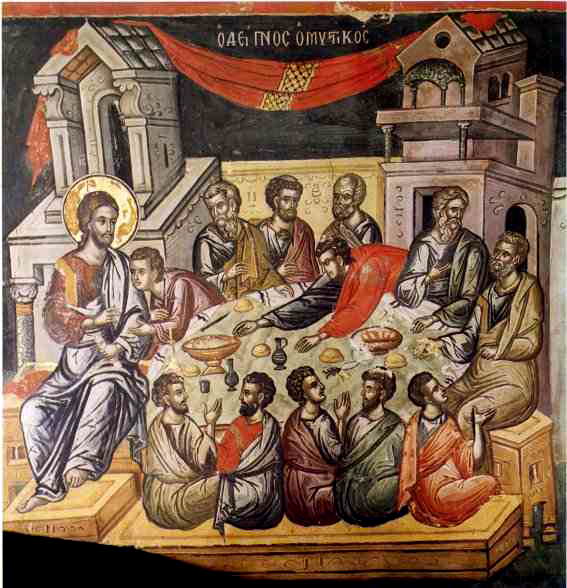
Last Supper, also from Stavronikita. Western influence is more apparent here, in the figures of the apostles especially.

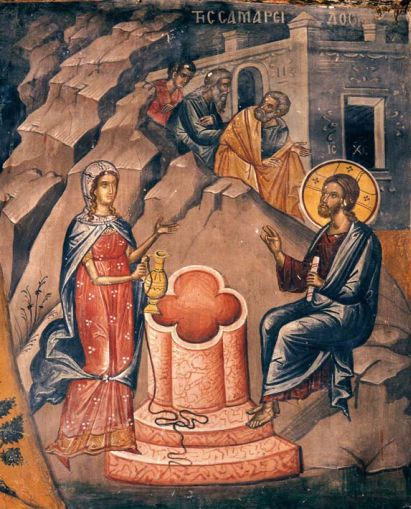
Jesus and the Samaritan Woman

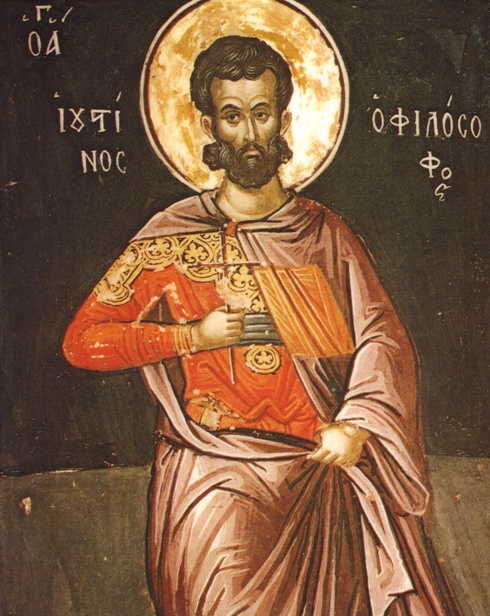
Saint Justin

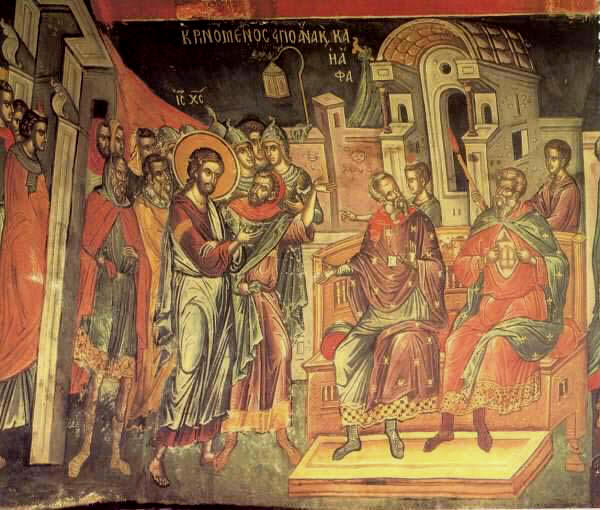
Jesus before Pontius Pilate

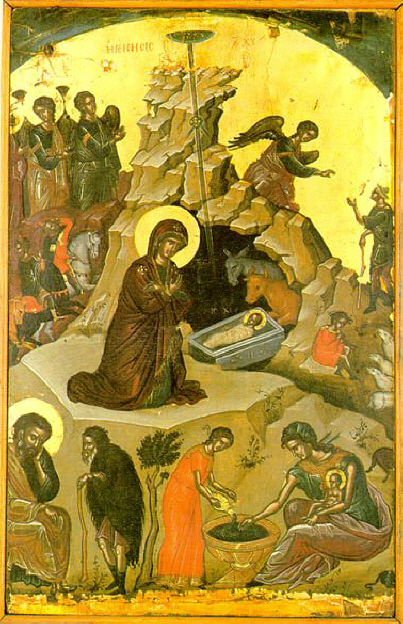
The Nativity Story

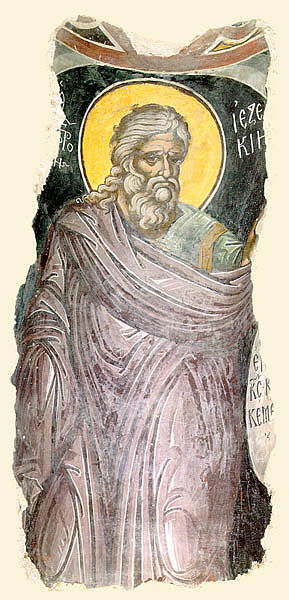
Prophet Ezekiel

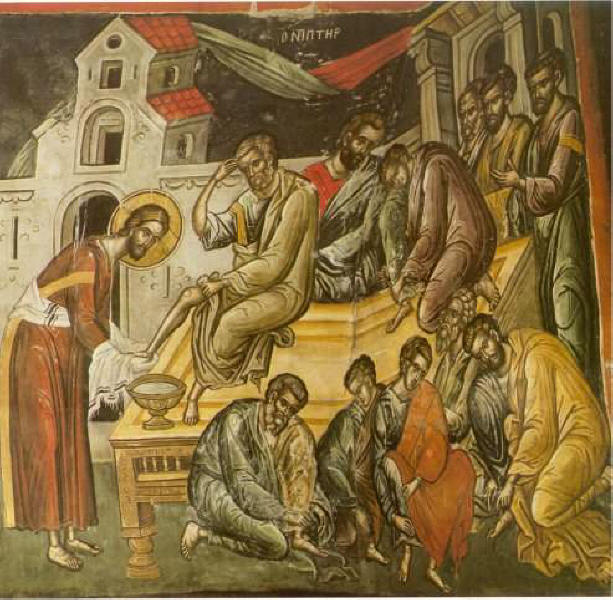
Washing of the feet

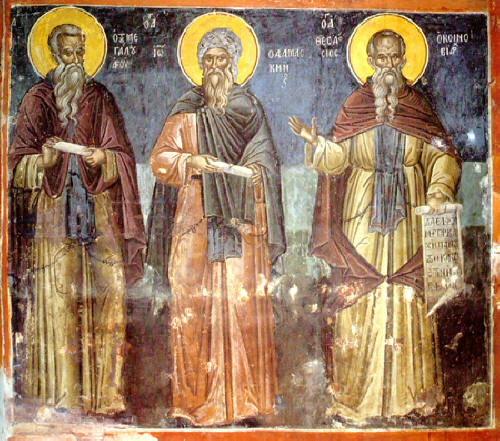
Sts. John, Theophanios, and Theodosios

== Bibliography ==
- Hatzidakis, Manolis (1987). Greek painters after the fall (1450-1830) Volume A. Center for Modern Greek Studies E.I.E.
- Hatzidakis, Manolis & Drakopoulou, Eugenia (1997). Greek painters after the fall (1450-1830) Volume B. Center for Modern Greek Studies E.I.E.
- Drakopoulou, Eugenia (2010). Greek painters after the fall (1450-1830) Volume C. Center for Modern Greek Studies E.I.E.
