= Frangos Katelanos =

Greek painter (1510/20 – 1590)

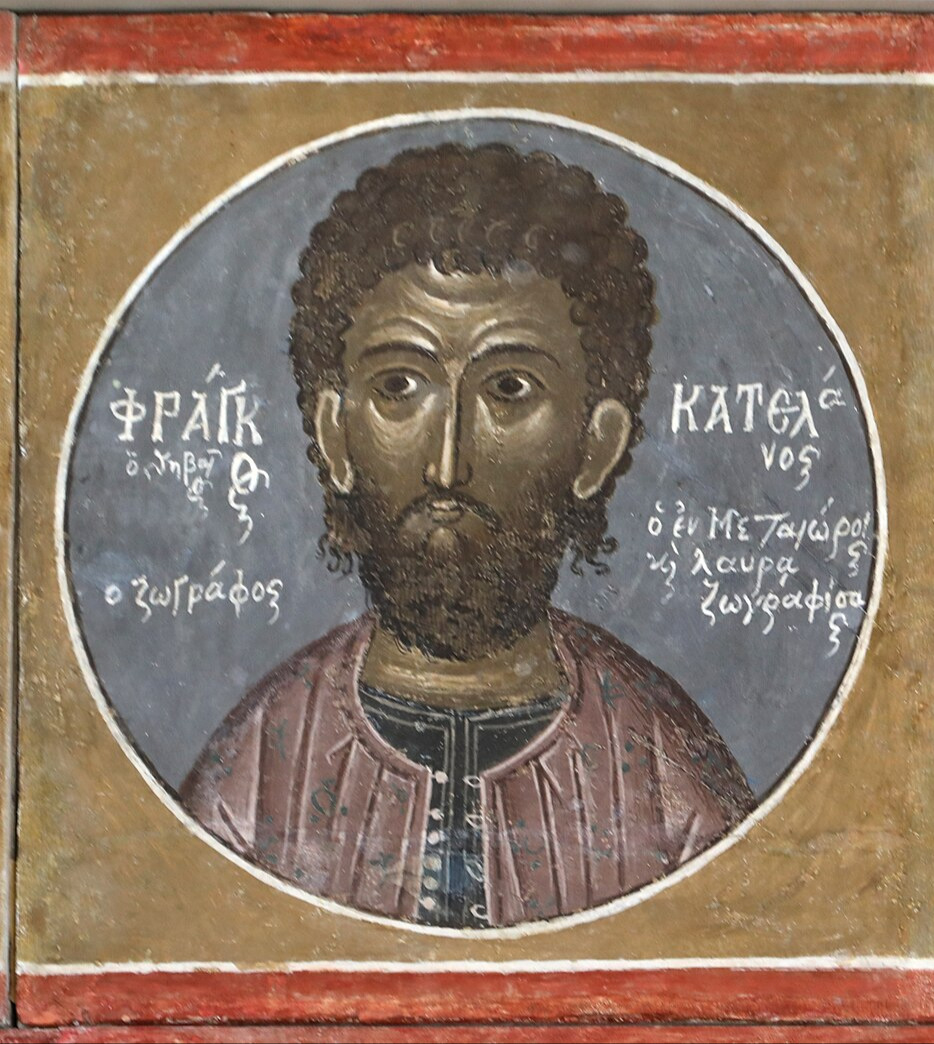
- Fresco by Photis Kontoglou
- Born: 1510–1520; Thebes
- Died: 1590; Kozani

Fragkos Katelanos (Greek: Φράγγος Κατελλάνος; 1510/20 – 1590) was a Greek painter. He specialized in icon and fresco-painting. His work resembles the Byzantine style of painting with attributes of the Cretan school. His work coincided with Theophanes the Cretan geographically and chronologically. His frescoes can be found in different parts of Greece. His signed work can be found at the Monastery of Great Lavra at Mount Athos. He is one of few Greek artists that were not associated with Venice or Crete. He mainly worked out of Ioannina. He was very popular during his time. Theophanes the Cretan was also associated with Mount Athos but he traveled back to Crete. He also spread the Cretan School to mainland Greece. Both Theophanes the Cretan, Katelanos influenced famous artist Dionysius of Fourna. Katelanos's frescos can be found all over Greece, including at Kozani, Ioannina, Kastoria and the Monastery of Varlaam in Meteora.

== History ==
Katelanos was born in Thebes during the Ottoman occupation of Greece. He was a fresco and icon painter. Not much is known about his life. He had a successful painting workshop. His workshop was centered around Ioannina. He is one of few known painters that operated in Mainland Greece. There is no record of him in Venice or Crete. He painted frescoes in churches at Mount Athos, Kastoria, Kozani, Ioannina, and the Monastery of Varlaam in Meteora. His signature was recorded at Mount Athos in 1560. His work is dated between 1539 and 1590.

He painted primarily in the Byzantine style but due to his exposure to the work of the Cretan school. He can fall into both categories. Some monasteries preferred the classical style of Byzantine fresco painting.

Other painters who painted frescoes in the Byzantine style were Theodore Apsevdis, Ioannis Pagomenos, Manuel Panselinos, Theophanes the Cretan, Michael Astrapas and Eutychios. His works influenced countless artists.

== Gallery ==
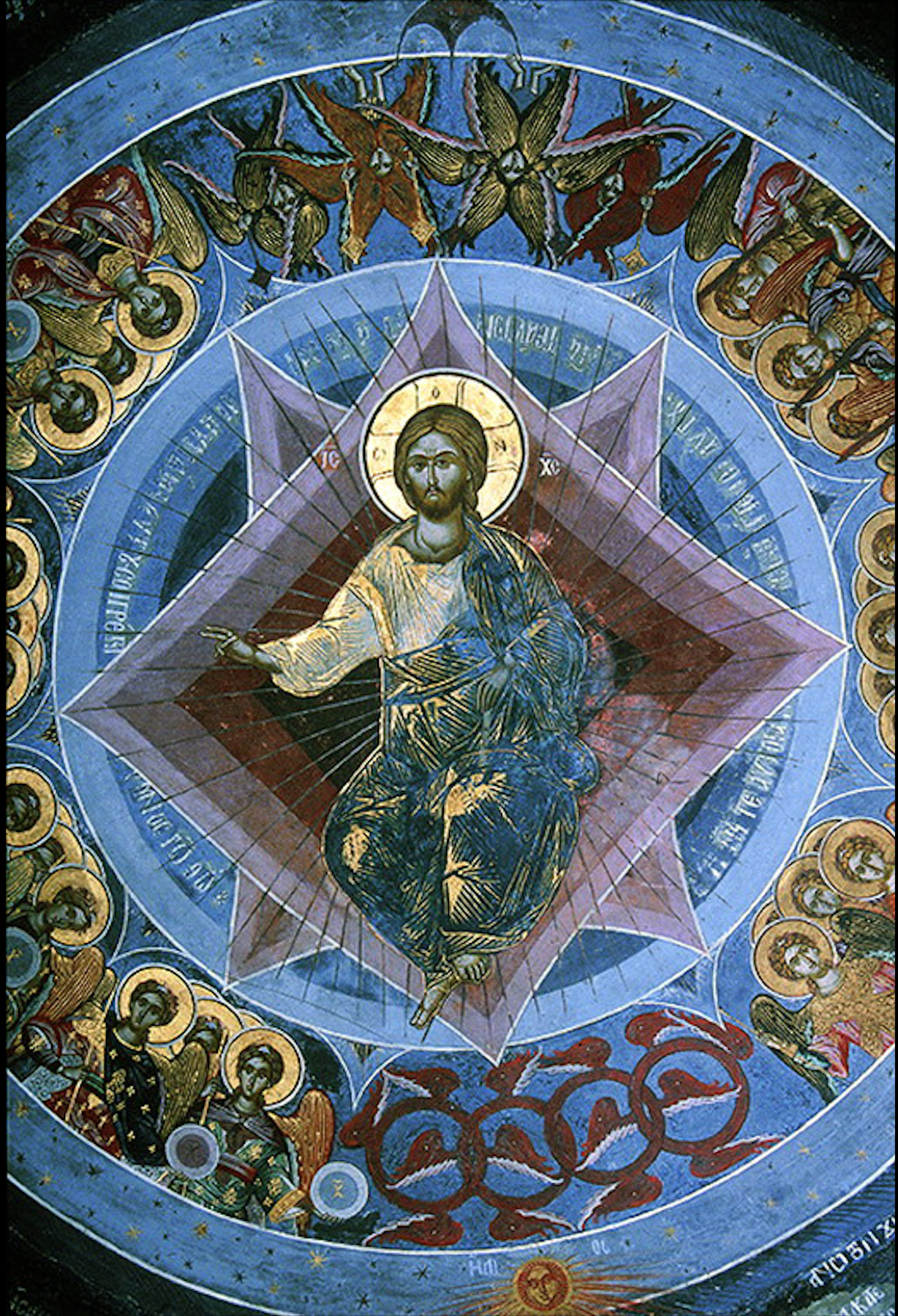
Christ Pantocrator

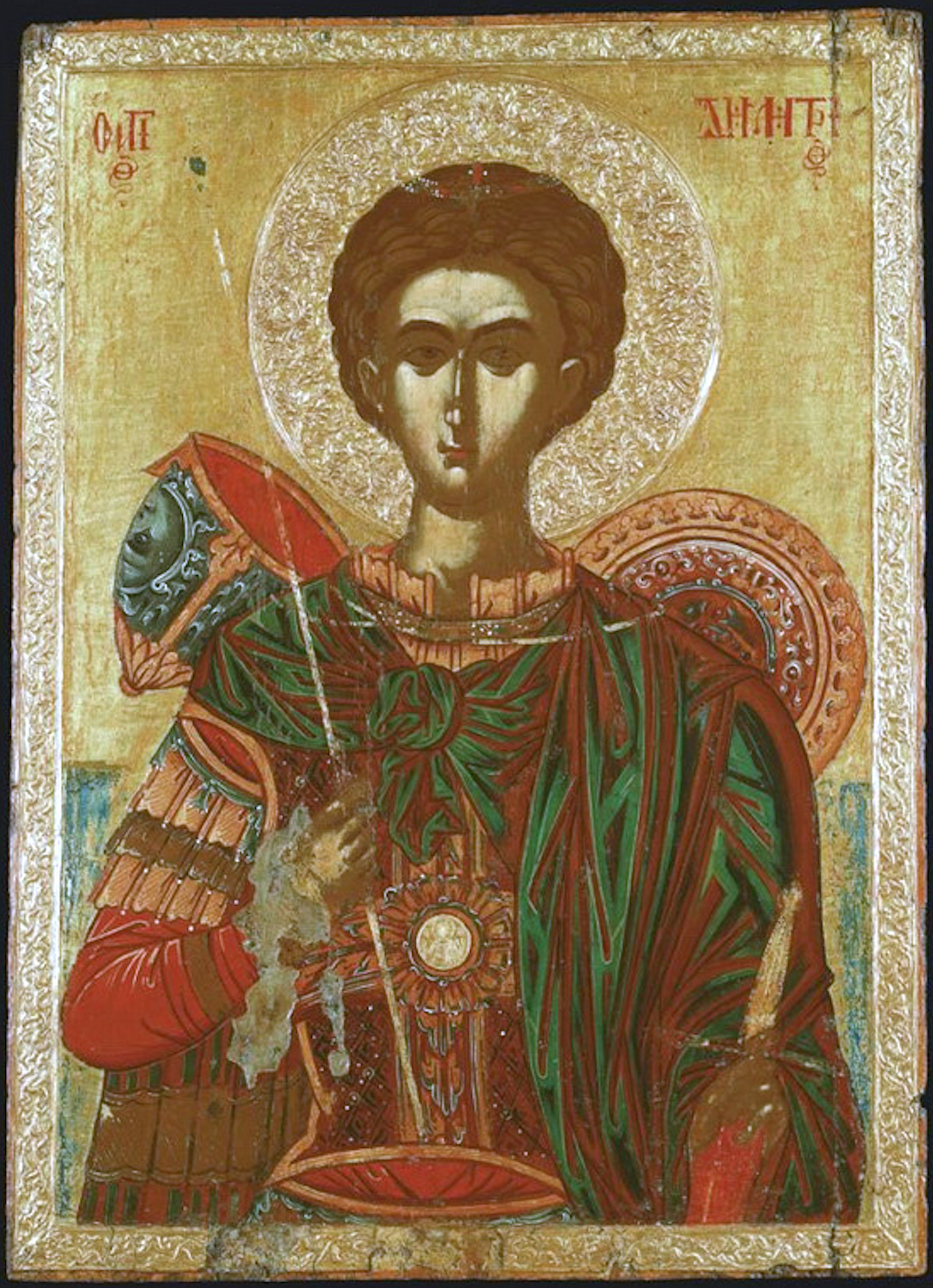
Saint Demetrios

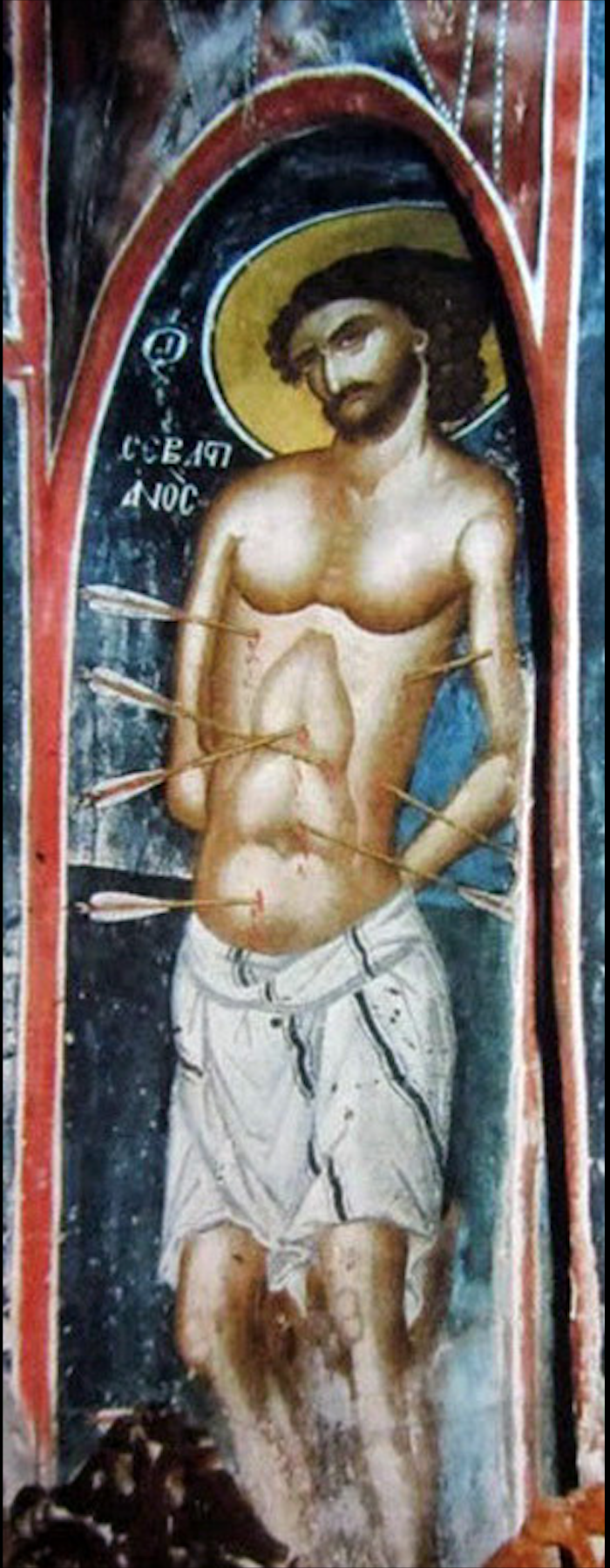
Saint Sebastian

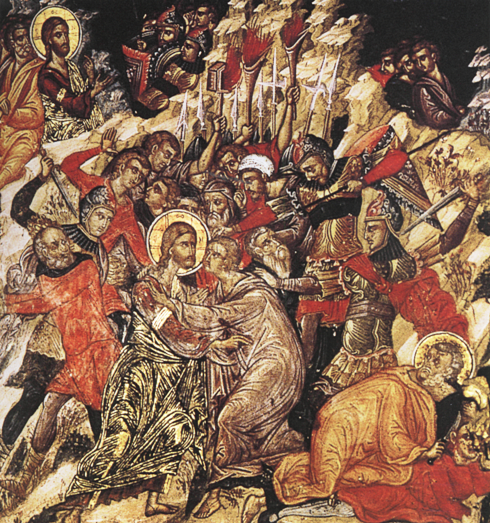
Betrayal of Judas

== Notable works ==
=== Frescoes ===
- Chapel of Agios Nikolaos, Megisti Lavra, Mount Athos
- Katholikon of the Monastery of Myrtia, 1539, Lake Trichonida, Aetolia-Acarnania
- Monastery of the Philanthropenoi (dome of the main temple and wall drums, upper part of a narthex), 1542, Island of Ioannina
- Katholikon of Barlaam monastery (main temple), 1548, Meteora

== Sources ==
- Hatzidakis, Manolis; Drakopoulou, Evgenia (1997). Έλληνες Ζωγράφοι μετά την Άλωση (1450-1830). Τόμος 2: Καβαλλάρος - Ψαθόπουλος [Greek Painters after the Fall of Constantinople (1450-1830). Volume 2: Kavallaros - Psathopoulos]. Athens: Center for Modern Greek Studies, National Research Foundation. hdl:10442/14088. ISBN 960-7916-00-X.
