= Christodoulos Kalergis =

Greek painter

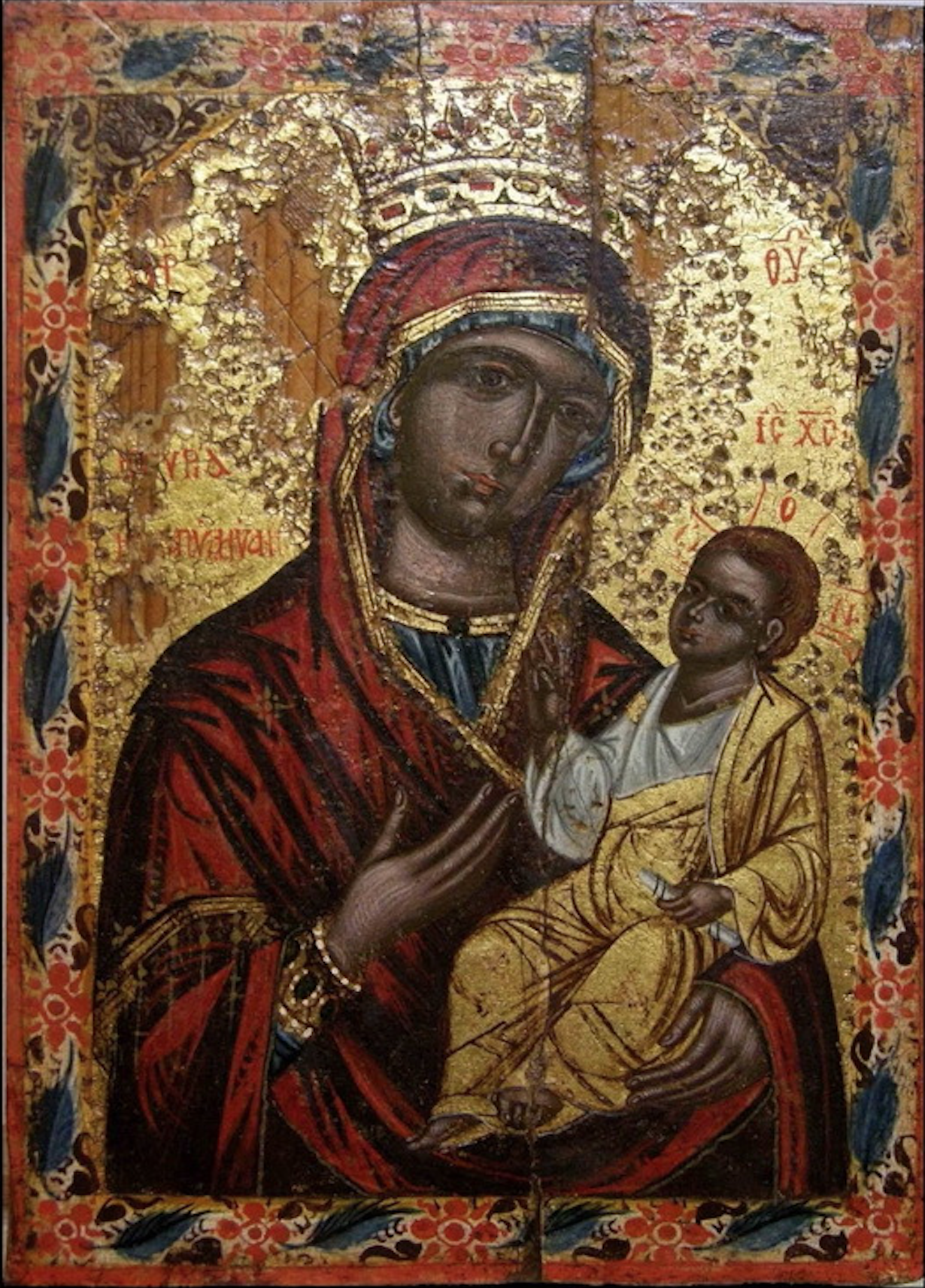
- Virgin and Child
- Born: 1678–1683; Mykonos
- Died: 1740; Mykonos
- Known for: Iconography and hagiography
- Movement: Neo-Hellenikos Diafotismos; Greek Rococo

Christodoulos Kalergis (Greek: Χριστόδουλος Καλέργης, 1678–1683 – 1740), also known as Christodoulos Kallergis, was a Greek painter. He is one of the few Greek painters that were not from Crete or the Ionian Islands. He was from the Cyclades. He was active on the island of Mykonos and the Peloponnese Region. He is a member of the Neo-Hellenikos Diafotismos in art and the Greek Rococo period. Emmanuel Skordilis brought the art of Crete to the Cyclades. He influenced Kalergis and other local artists. Kalergis's most notable piece is the Virgin and Child. His art resembles a mixture of late Byzantine art and the Venetian influenced maniera greca. Ten of his paintings and four frescos have survived. Around the period, another famous artist Nikolaos Kallergis shared the same last name.

== History ==
Kalergis was born on the island Mykonos. Not much is known about his life. Historians have followed the trail of signatures and dates based on frescos in different places. His first dated work was in Cynuria at the Monastery of Theotokos Artocostas around 1698. Two years later he was in Megali Vrisi, Laconia at the Church of Prodromou. In 1706, he frescoed the church of Agios Ioannis in Milia, Messenia. He frescoed the Church of Saint Nicholas in the Castle of Zarnata before 1715. It is also located in the Mani region close to Avia. By 1719, he was back on the Cyclades on the island of Serifos. The artist frescoed the Moni Taxiarchon Serifos. Some of his icons are on the islands of Amorgos, Mykonos, and Serifos. Here is one example of his signatures: διά χειρός εμού Χριστοδούλου Καλλέργη εκ νήσου Μυκόνου.

== Gallery ==
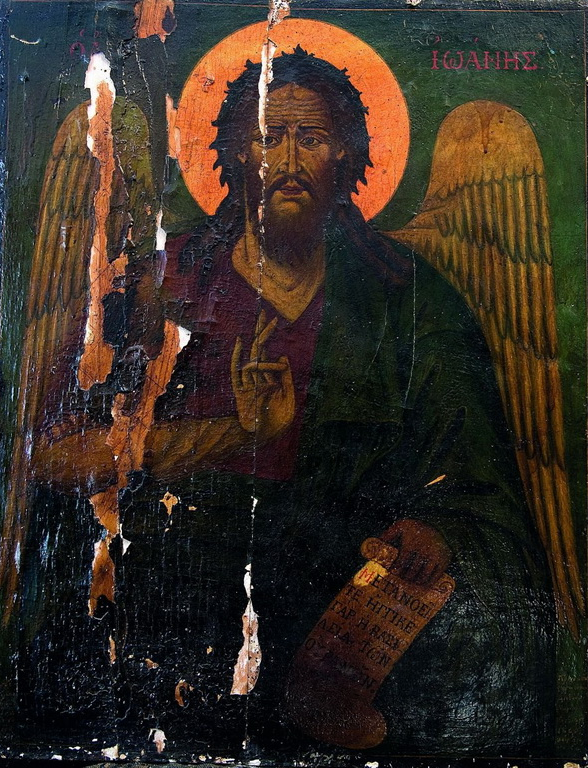
John the Baptist

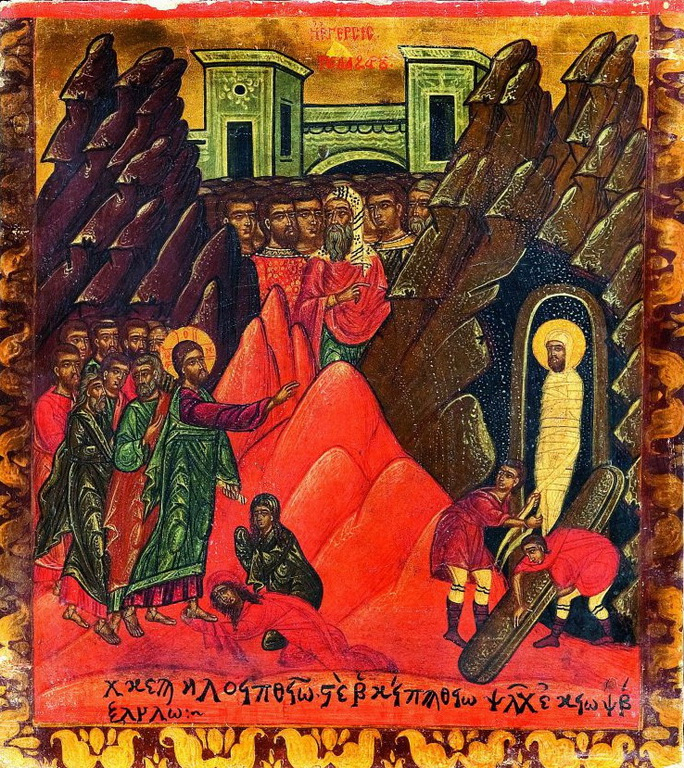
Raising of Lazarus

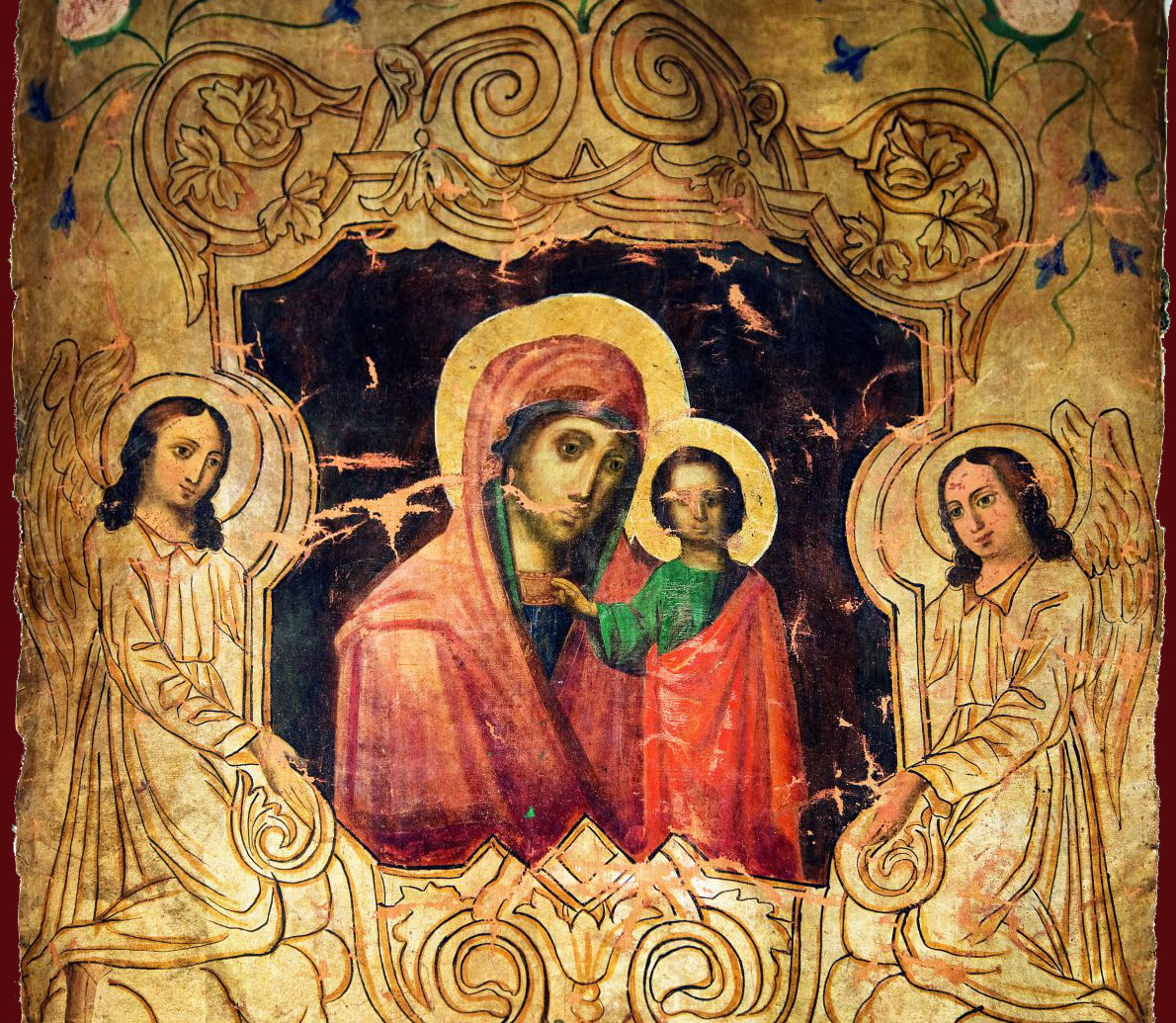
Madonna and Child

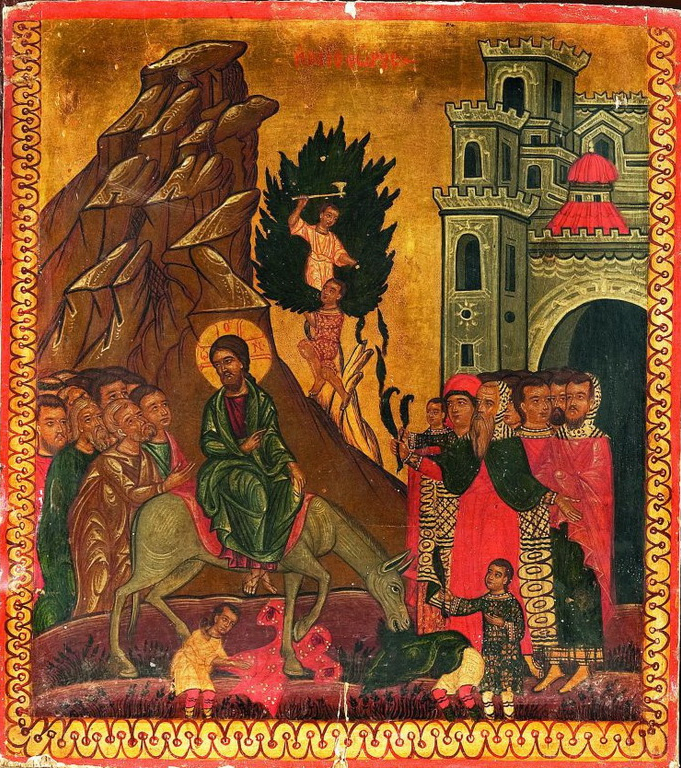
Entry into Jerusalem

== See also ==
- Georgios Markou

== Bibliography ==
- Anomerites, Giorgos (2011). Χριστόδουλος Καλέργης Ενασ Περιπλανωμενοσ Ζωγράφος Εκ Νήσου Μικονου [Christodoulos Kallergis A Traveling Painter from the Island of Mykonos]. Athens, Greece: Militos. ISBN 9789604642526.
- Hatzidakis, Manolis (1987). Έλληνες Ζωγράφοι μετά την Άλωση (1450-1830). Τόμος 1: Αβέρκιος - Ιωσήφ [Greek Painters after the Fall of Constantinople (1450-1830). Volume 1: Averkios - Iosif]. Athens: Center for Modern Greek Studies, National Research Foundation. hdl:10442/14844. ISBN 960-7916-01-8.
- Hatzidakis, Manolis; Drakopoulou, Evgenia (1997). Έλληνες Ζωγράφοι μετά την Άλωση (1450-1830). Τόμος 2: Καβαλλάρος - Ψαθόπουλος [Greek Painters after the Fall of Constantinople (1450-1830). Volume 2: Kavallaros - Psathopoulos]. Athens: Center for Modern Greek Studies, National Research Foundation. hdl:10442/14088. ISBN 960-7916-00-X.
- Drakopoulou, Evgenia (2010). Έλληνες Ζωγράφοι μετά την Άλωση (1450–1830). Τόμος 3: Αβέρκιος - Ιωσήφ [Greek Painters after the Fall of Constantinople (1450–1830). Volume 3: Averkios - Joseph]. Athens, Greece: Center for Modern Greek Studies, National Research Foundation. ISBN 978-960-7916-94-5.
