= Nikolaos Philanthropinos =

Greek Byzantine painter (c. 1380 – c. 1435)

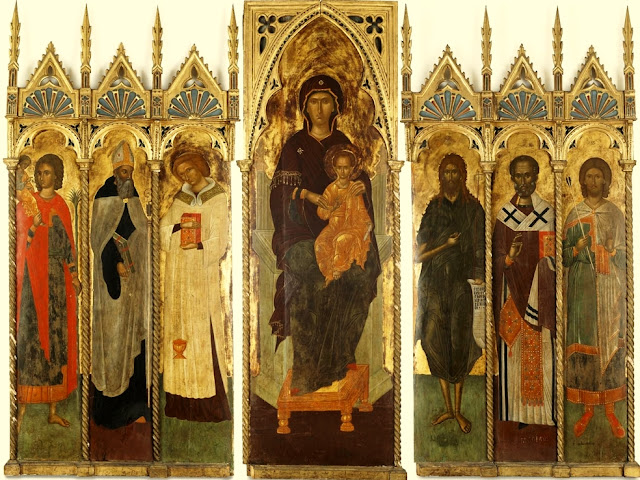
- Altarpiece
- Born: 1380–1385; Constantinople (modern-day Istanbul, Turkey)
- Died: 1435–1450; Heraklion or Venice
- Known for: Painting
- Movement: Byzantine art Palaeologan Renaissance; Greek Renaissance; Italian Renaissance

Nikolaos Philanthropinos (Greek: Νικόλαος Φιλανθρωπηνός, c. 1380–1385 – c. 1435–1450), also known as Nicolaos Philanthropenos and Nicolaus Filantropinó or Philastropino, was a Byzantine Greek painter. He was active in Crete, Venice, and Constantinople. He was a very famous painter during the onset of the Italian Renaissance, the end of the Palaeologan Renaissance and the beginning of the Greek Renaissance. He worked with Venetian master Nicolaus Storlado. His contemporaries in Crete were Manuel Fokas and Ioannis Pagomenos. He brought the art of Constantinople to Venice and Crete. He influenced both Greek and Italian art. Artists he influenced include: Angelos Akotantos and Andreas Ritzos. He completed some mosaics for St Mark's Basilica in Venice.

== History ==
Philanthropinos was born in Constantinople. His father's name was Georgios. He was a priest. His brother was famous woodcarver Ioannis Philanthropinos. According to records, the family migrated to Heraklion, Crete on November 21, 1396. They were members of the noble Byzantine Greek family Philanthropenos. The family appeared in the mid-13th century and produced a number of high-ranking generals and officials until the end of the Byzantine Empire.

On December 3, 1400, Nikolaos signed a contract to teach Maria Mussuro's son George painting for three years. Venetian painter Nicolaus Storlado and Philanthropinos were business partners. They jointly operated a painting workshop. According to an existing contract created in 1400, they were in business for three years in Heraklion.

On July 14, 1412, Philanthropinos received an order from wealthy noble Alexander Barbo to make a painting. On November 2, 1413, he decorated a pair of curtains with gold for the noble Orestio de Molino. On July 23, 1418, Philanthropinos was hired by George Chrysovergis to create icons of the Virgin Mary and Saint George. Chrysovergis was from a local village in Heraklion. The contract gave the artist twenty days to complete the project. One year later he was involved in a legal case.

It was against Venetian law for priests to meet with higher-ranking priests outside the Venetian Empire without special permission from the government. Philanthropinos had close ties to elite Byzantine noble circles. He was related to the Patriarch of Constantinople Joseph II. Michael Kalophrenas a Greek priest and scholar was involved in an incident. He married a nun. His relationship with the nuns created controversy within the ecclesiastical community. Philanthropinos traveled to Constantinople with Kalophrenas from Heraklion. They were also with the famous Greek Monk Arsenious. Philanthropinos was involved in the incident indirectly, the Patriarch of Constantinople tried to intervene in the matter involving Kalophrenas. Philanthropinos was accused of trying to increase the influence of the Patriarch of Constantinople in Venetian held Crete. On January 23, 1419, he testified that his trip was to buy special painting supplies for his art. He was convicted of breaking the law and was sentenced to eight months in prison.

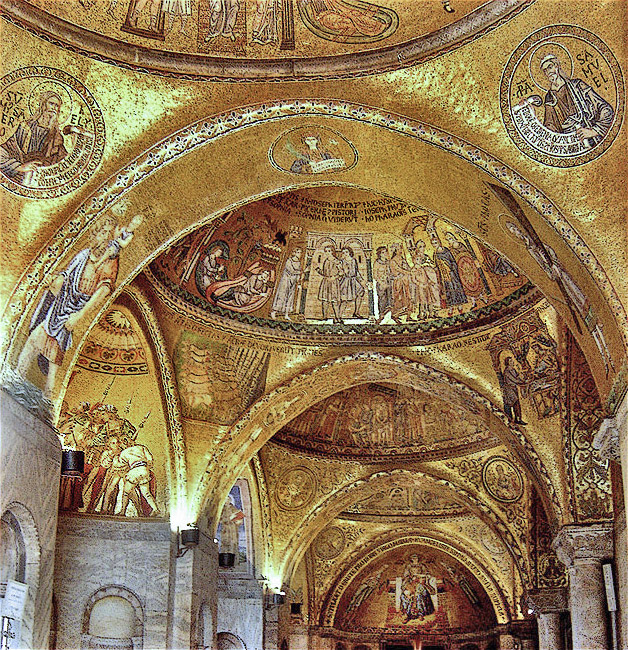
Mosaics, looking east

The artist continued working as a painter after the incident. He traveled to Venice. The archives mention him as: magister Nicolaus Philastropino, magister artis musaice in ecclesia Sancti Marci. On June 21, 1435, he completed some mosaics for St Mark's Basilica. He was the chief mosaicist in the Basilica after the fire of 1419. Archives referred to him as prothomagister, which means teacher. He brought the traditional Byzantine technique to Venice. He worked with Paolo Uccello and Michele Giambono. Philanthropinos was not the only famous Greek painter affiliated with the extraordinary historic basilica. In 1594, Thomas Bathas was hired to maintain the Miraculous Icon of the Virgin Mary at St Mark's Basilica. Italian researcher Father Mario Cattapan has done extensive work relating to Philanthropinos.

He is not the only Greek painter to have worked in Venice. When Saint Marc's was first erected there was an outcry to Constantinople for Greek Master painters. A message asking for mosaic artists was sent to Constantinople by Desiderius, the abbot of Monte Cassino. An archive demonstrates that in 1153 Marco Greco Indriomeni was a Greek master of mosaics working in Venice. He worked on the mosaics of Saint Mark's Basilica. Theophanes of Constantinople and Apollonios were two other Greek painters living in Venice around 1242. Apollonios helped Andrea Tafi complete mosaics in Florence

== See also ==
- Belisario Corenzio
- Georgios Kalliergis
- Michele Greco da Valona
- Joseph Bryennios

== Bibliography ==
- Hatzidakis, Manolis; Drakopoulou, Evgenia (1997). Έλληνες Ζωγράφοι μετά την Άλωση (1450-1830). Τόμος 2: Καβαλλάρος - Ψαθόπουλος [Greek Painters after the Fall of Constantinople (1450-1830). Volume 2: Kavallaros - Psathopoulos]. Athens: Center for Modern Greek Studies, National Research Foundation. hdl:10442/14088. ISBN 960-7916-00-X.
