= Michael Astrapas and Eutychios =

Greek painters (fl. 1294–1317)

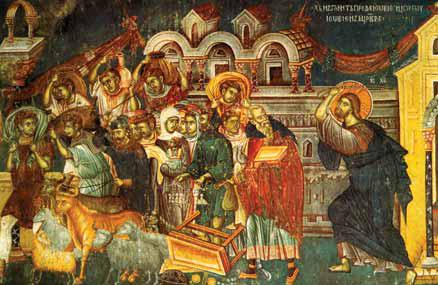
Christ Drives Out The Money Changers Church of St. Nicetas, Banjane

Michael Astrapas and Eutychios (Greek: Μιχαήλ Αστραπάς και Ευτύχιος; fl. 1294–1317) were Byzantine Greek painters from Thessaloniki. They had a very active workshop in the area and some of their work survived. Famous Thessalonian painter Manuel Panselinos was active around the same period. Thessaloniki was considered the second capital of the Byzantine Empire. The region featured many iconographic workshops. Most historians consider Thessaloniki the epicenter of the Macedonian School of painting during the Palaeologan Renaissance. Other prominent Byzantine artists were Ioannis Pagomenos, Theophanes the Greek and Theodore Apsevdis. The Byzantine style influenced countless Italian and Greek artists. The style eventually evolved into the Maniera Greca.

== History ==
Michael Astrapas and Eutychios were active painters in Northern Greece and the Macedonian region. Not much is known about the artists. Luckily they signed their work with signatures or monograms almost hidden in their frescoes on the garments of some saints, the weapons or armory of holy warriors or on items. There are documented stories about the work that did not survive. There were many active iconographic workshops in Thessaloniki. It was the second capital of the Byzantine Empire. Manuel Panselinos had a famous workshop in the same geographic region. The artists followed the traditional Byzantine style. Michael Astrapas and Eutychios traveled all over the empire from modern Greece, North Macedonia, and Serbia.

The artists were invited to Serbia by king Stefan Milutin. They were also hired by other patrons to work in their dominions on commissions as icon painters. The names Michael and Eutychios were persevered in the inscriptions of four churches at Staro Nagoricino, Prizren, Banjani, and Ohrid. The frescoes exhibit strong chiaroscuro and heavy folds within the heavy drapery. There is a frescos cycle outlining the life of Mary including the Dormition. This can be found in the prothesis of the Church of Saint George.

One theory explains that Eutychios Astrapas was Michael Astrapas's father. Marković explains that because of the difference in painting styles a plausible argument can be made that there is a father-son relationship between the two artists. Some of the work was signed the hand of Michael, son of Eutychios.

== Gallery ==
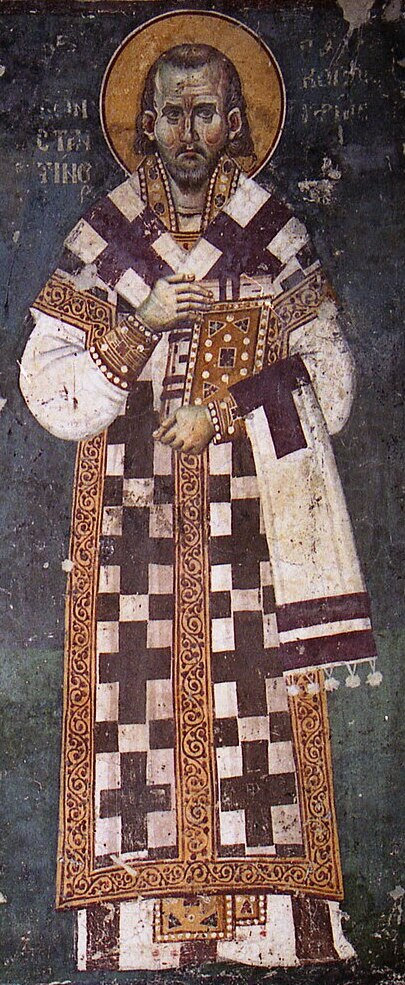
Fresco of Constantine Cavassila (possibly a work of Panselinos)

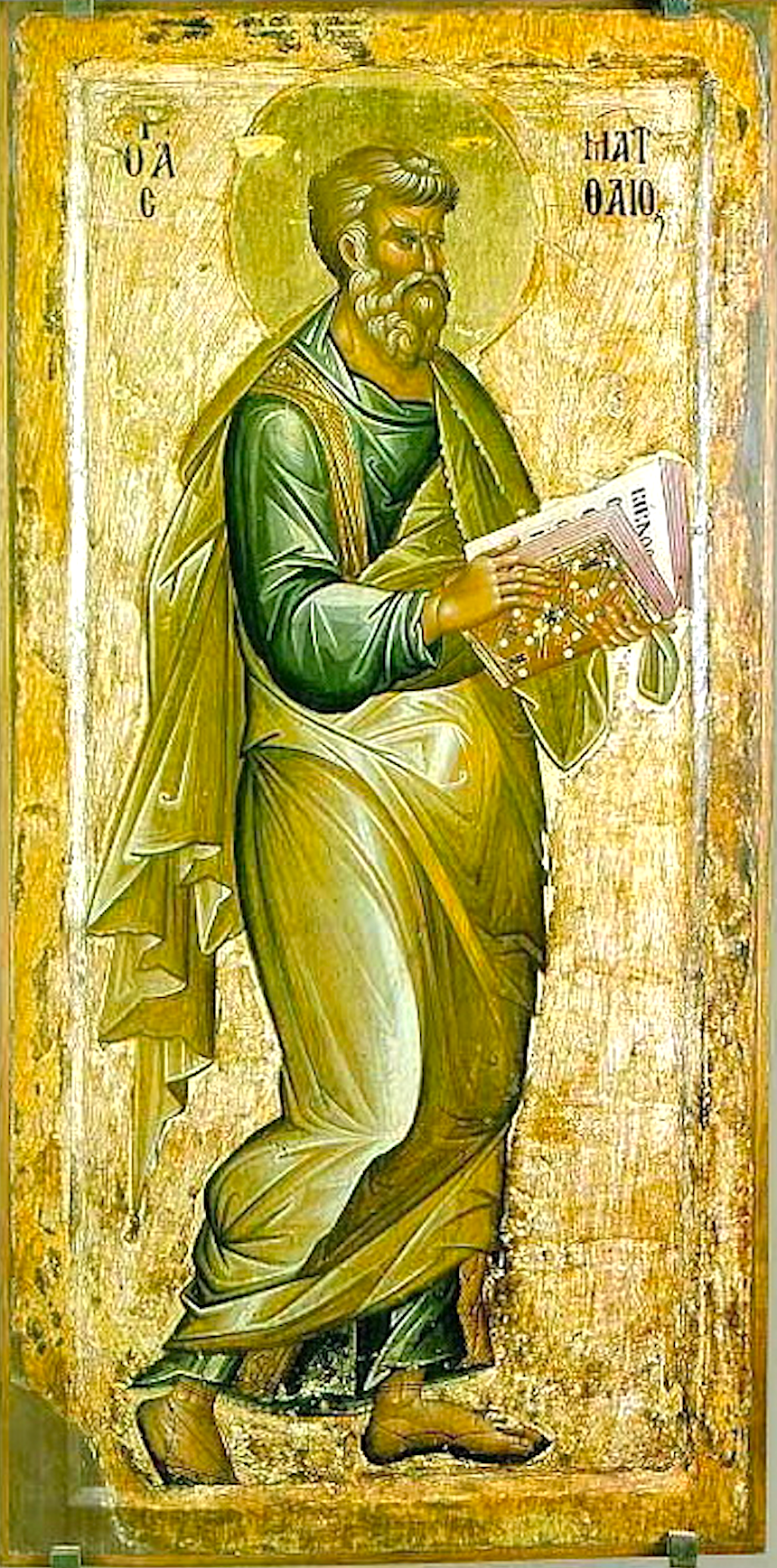
Matthew the Apostle

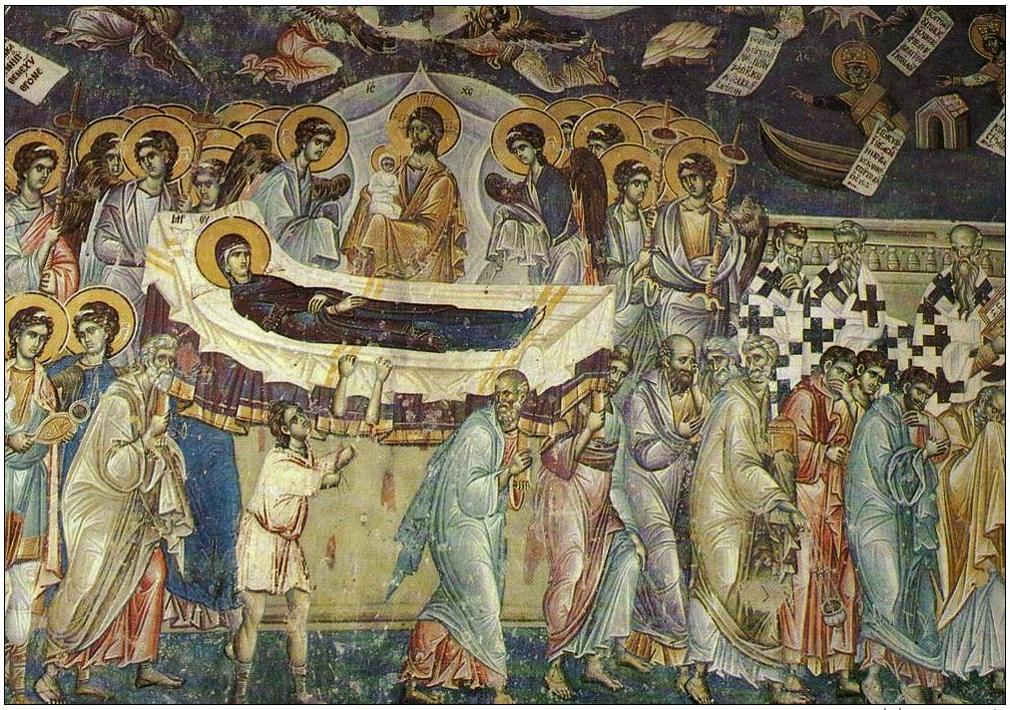
St.George Ascension of Our Lady

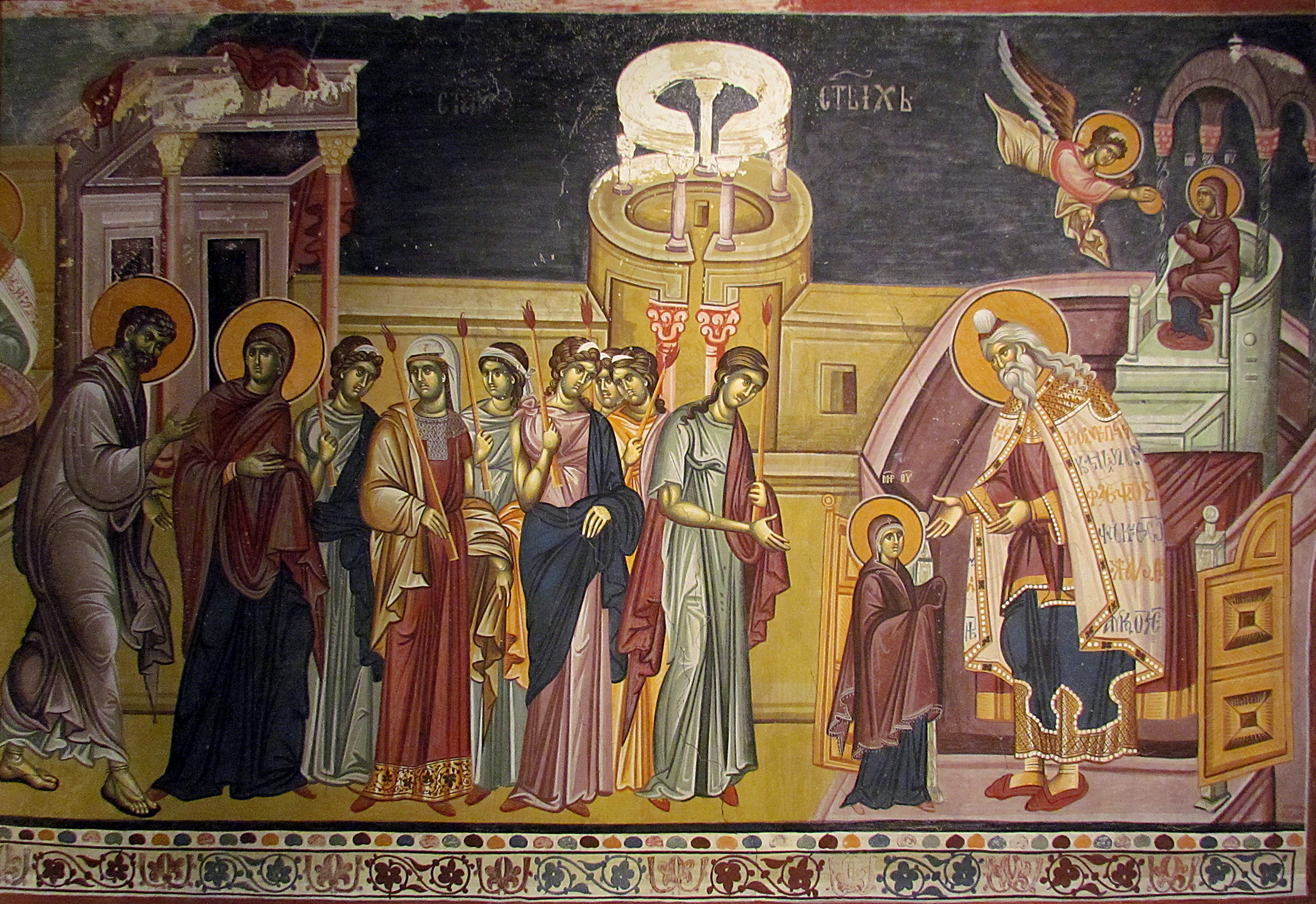
Presentation of the Mother of God in the Temple 1313–14.

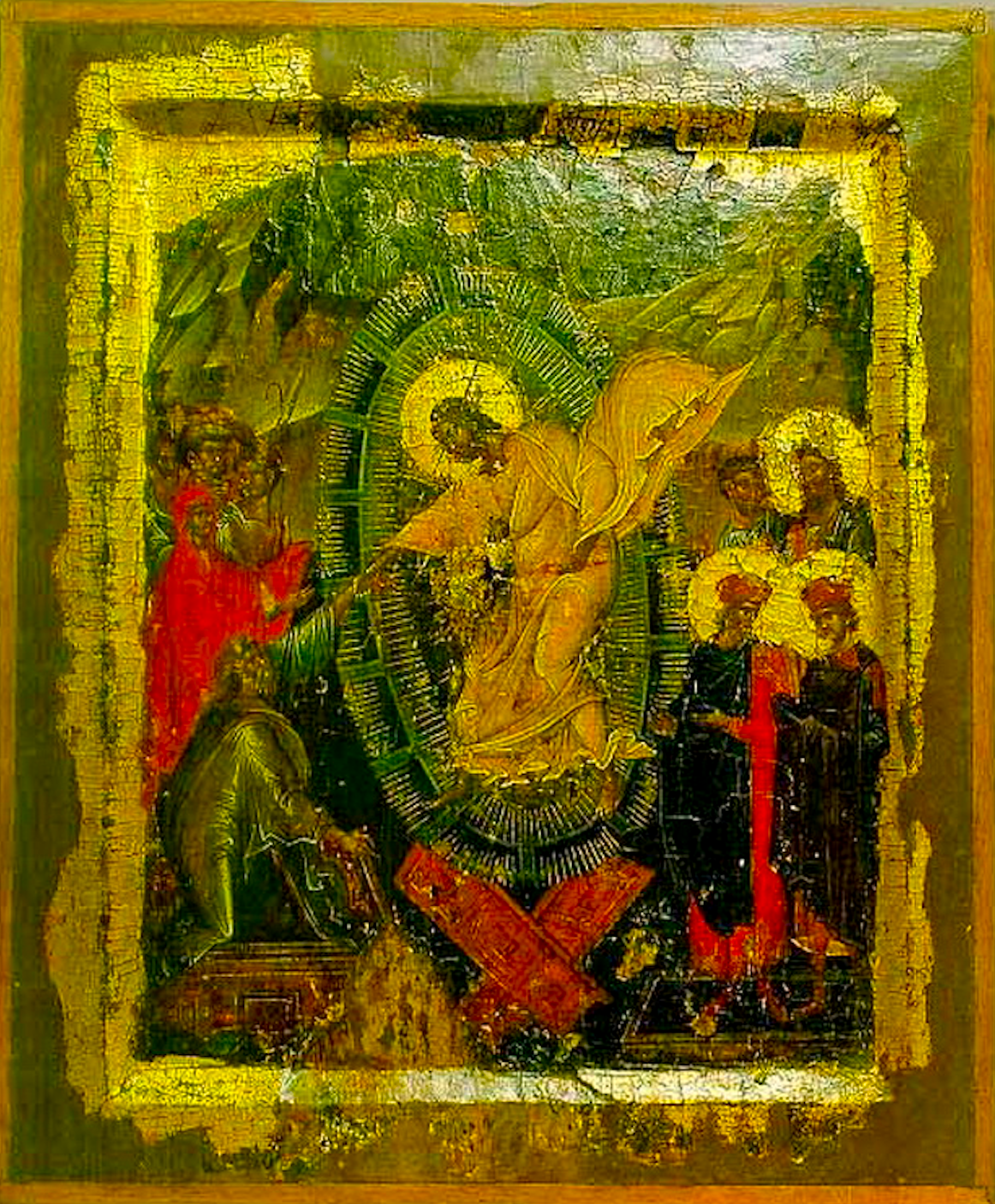
Resurrection

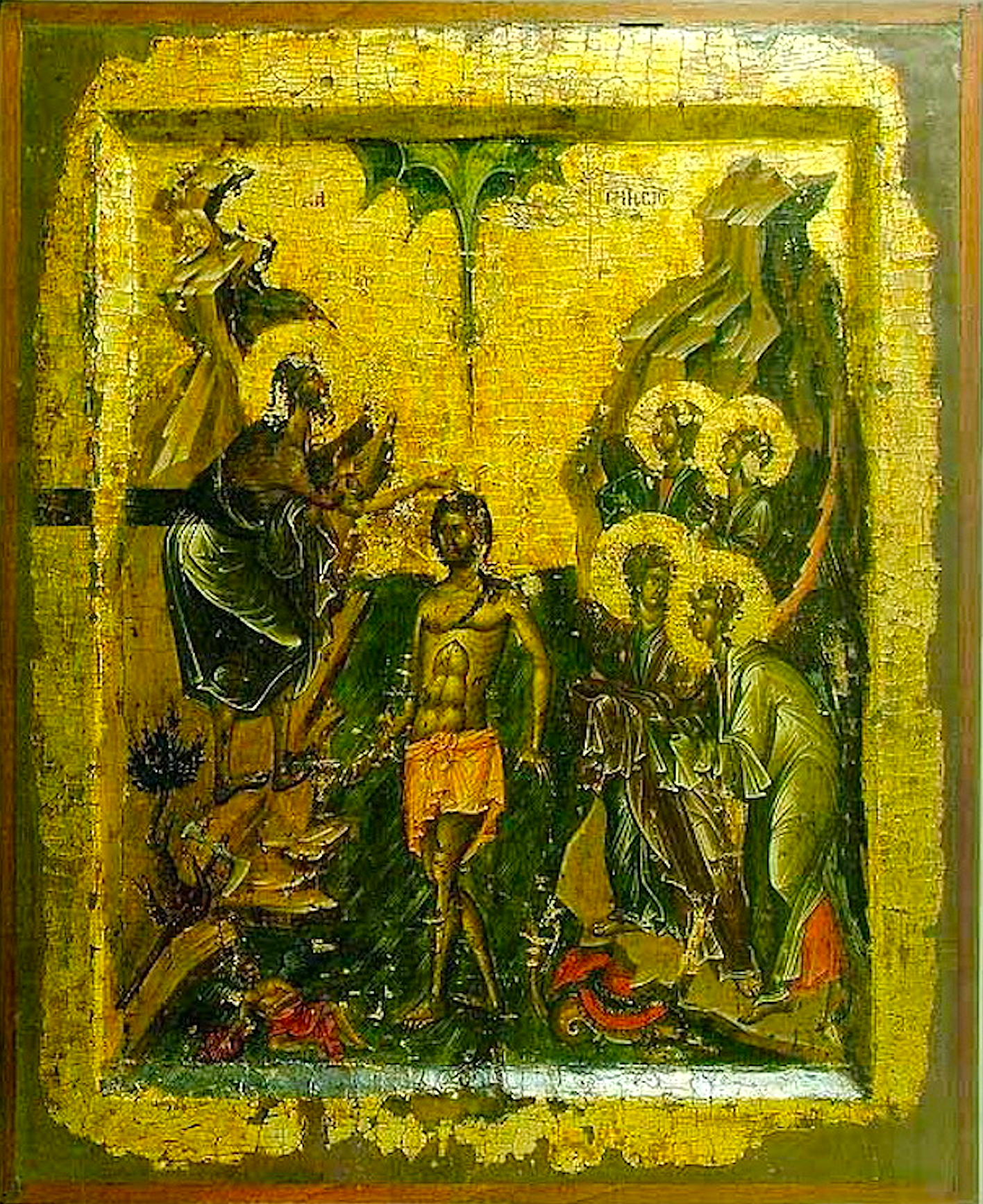
Baptism of Jesus

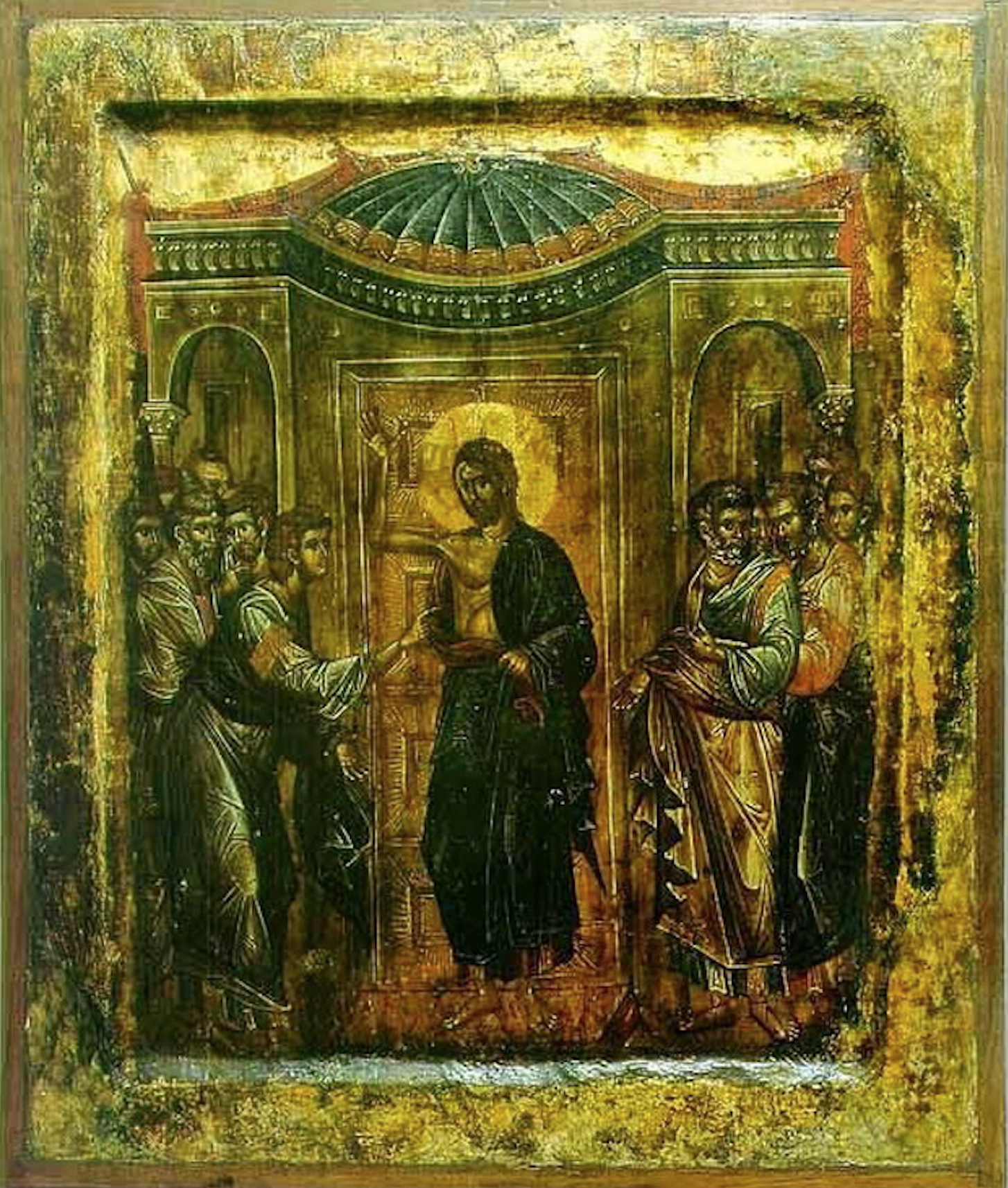
Doubting of Thomas

== Notable works ==
- Church of St. Mary Peribleptos in Ohrid (1294)
- Church of Saint Niketas at Čucer Sandevo (before 1315)
- Church of Our Lady of Ljeviš in Prizren (1307)
- Church of Saint George at Staro Nagoričane (1317)

== See also ==
- Byzantine art
- Palaeologan Age
- List of Macedonians (Greek)
- List of painters from Serbia
