= Nikolaos Lampoudis =

15th-century Greek painter

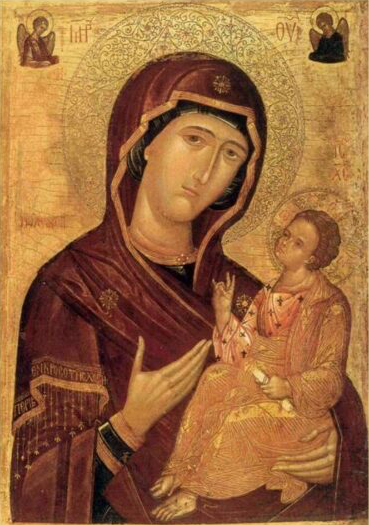
- Virgin and Child Hodegetria
- Born: Sparta, Greece
- Died: Sparta, Greece
- Known for: Painter
- Movement: Cretan school Byzantine art

Nikolaos Lampoudis (Greek: Νικόλαος Λαμπούδης) was a 15th-century Greek painter from Sparta. The only work of his of which historians are aware is an icon of the Virgin and Child of a kind known as a hodegetria or eleusa.

Lampoudis was a member of the Greek Renaissance's early Cretan School, a movement influenced by the art of Venice. Byzantine art also played a part in shaping his style. Angelos Akotantos and Andreas Ritzos were among the other Greek artists of Lampoudis's time who worked in a similar manner. The Cretan School's movement from the Byzantine tradition towards a more refined technique has a parallel in how Duccio and Giotto developed their work in Italy.

== History ==
Lampoudis was born in Sparta. Not much is known about his life. The only existing record is an icon painted during the 15th century. His signature describes his place of origin. Sparta was part of the Despotate of the Morea and fell to the Ottomans in 1460. The last name was associated with the Greek-Byzantine family named Lampoudios.

The name appears throughout Byzantine history from the 11th century until the 15th century. There was a famous scribe by the name Matthew Sebastos Lampoudes from the Péloponnèse region, possibly Spartan. The earliest known record of the Lampoudes name in Crete was 1562–1563. Records exist regarding Kyriakos Lampoudes.

Lampoudis's technique is the Greek-Byzantine technique prevalent in Thessaloniki, Constantinople, and Crete. Angelos Akotantos's and Andreas Ritzos's paintings served as the prototype of the maniera greca and the Greek Renaissance or Cretan school.

Lampoudis appears at the end of the Byzantine art movement and the beginning of the Greek Renaissance.

The Lampoudis painting has been preserved for over six hundred years. The icon is in a private collection in Athens, it previously belonged to a collector in Rome. The icon's dimensions are 0.67 X 0.47 X 0.02 meter or 2.2 X 1.54 X 0.07 feet and is painted on wood that forms a relief frame.

The painting was bought at an auction in London. It belonged to an Italian family for three generations. In 1981, it was preserved by Rodolfo Lujan. He fixed the wood and painting. He also cleaned it in a special laboratory. In 1984, the Byzantine Museum in Athens proved the authenticity of the signature. His signature was ΧΕΙΡ ΝΙΚΟΛΑΟΥ ΤΟΥ ΛΑΜΠΟΥΔΗ, ΣΠAPTIATOY

== See also ==
- Emmanuel Lambardos
- Georgios Kalliergis

== Bibliography ==
- Hatzidakis, Manolis (1987). Έλληνες Ζωγράφοι μετά την Άλωση (1450-1830). Τόμος 1: Αβέρκιος - Ιωσήφ [Greek Painters after the Fall of Constantinople (1450-1830). Volume 1: Averkios - Iosif] (in Greek). Athens: Center for Modern Greek Studies, National Research Foundation. hdl:10442/14844. ISBN 960-7916-01-8.
- Hatzidakis, Manolis; Drakopoulou, Evgenia (1997). Έλληνες Ζωγράφοι μετά την Άλωση (1450-1830). Τόμος 2: Καβαλλάρος - Ψαθόπουλος [Greek Painters after the Fall of Constantinople (1450-1830). Volume 2: Kavallaros - Psathopoulos] (in Greek). Athens: Center for Modern Greek Studies, National Research Foundation. hdl:10442/14088. ISBN 960-7916-00-X.
- Drakopoulou, Evgenia (2010). Έλληνες Ζωγράφοι μετά την Άλωση (1450–1830). Τόμος 3: Αβέρκιος - Ιωσήφ [Greek Painters after the Fall of Constantinople (1450–1830). Volume 3: Averkios - Joseph] (in Greek). Athens, Greece: Center for Modern Greek Studies, National Research Foundation. ISBN 978-960-7916-94-5.
