= Manuel Panselinos =

Greek painter and iconographer

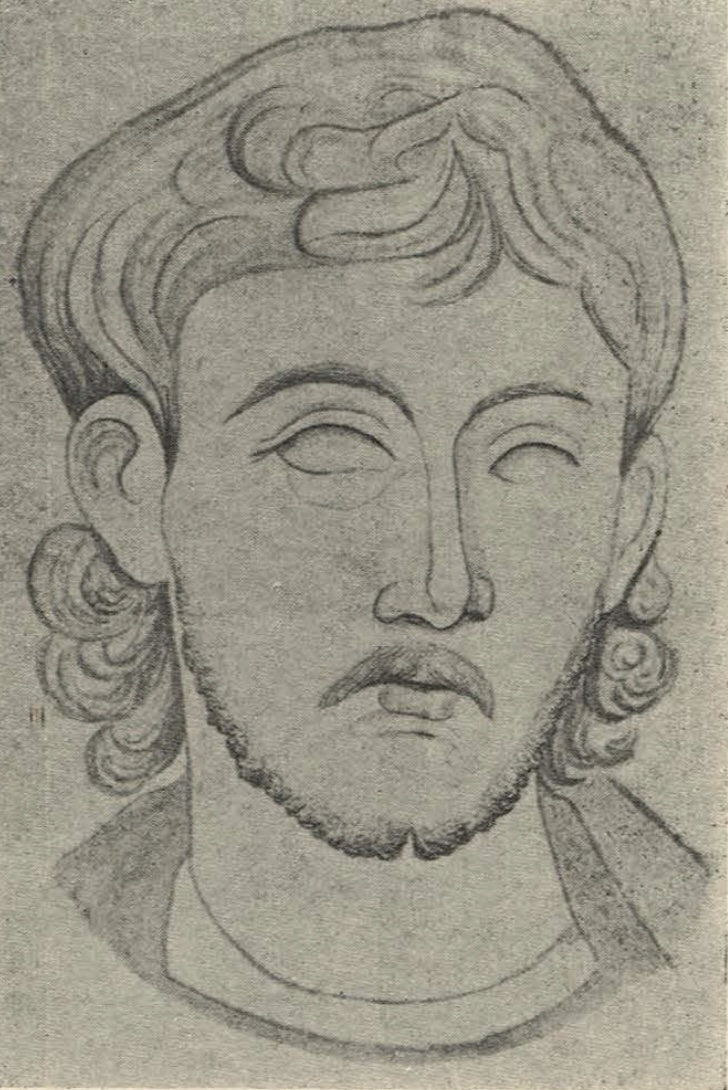
- “Portrait of Panselin, drawn by Mr. Blagoveshchensky, a companion of Rev. Porphyry of the Assumption, from a fresco painted, according to legend, by Panselin himself in the porch of the Protaton Church and transferred from here to a cell by the monk painter Damaskin. (From the papers of Reverend Porfiry Ouspensky).”
- Born: Immanuel Panselinos late 13th century Thessaloniki, Macedonia, Byzantine Empire
- Died: early 14th century Thessaloniki, Macedonia, Byzantine Empire
- Known for: Iconography and hagiography
- Notable work: Mount Athos: Protaton Church (13th century); Lavra Monastery (13th century); Vatopedi Monastery (14th century)
- Movement: Palaeologan Renaissance and Macedonian school

Manuel Panselinos (Greek: Μανουήλ Πανσέληνος) was a Byzantine Greek painter and writer of the Palaeologan Renaissance, known for introducing pathos into frescos, murals and especially icons from the 13th and 14th centuries. He was active in the region of Macedonia, and was widely considered to be the most prominent and influential figure of the Palaeologan Renaissance and the Macedonian school of painting centered at the Empire's second-largest city, Thessaloniki.

== Biography ==
Manuel Panselinos was born in the late 13th century in Thessaloniki. His primary works were iconography and frescos. His works can be found in several monasteries of Mount Athos: Vatopedi, Megisti Lavra, and the Protaton Church in Karyes. His most important work is the mural painting of the church of the Protaton. His contemporaries were Georgios Kalliergis, Michael Astrapas, and Eutychios Astrapas. Some historians believe Kalliergis was one of his students due to the similarity in painting styles.

However, the tradition ascribing the Athonite paintings to Manuel has only been attested in the 17th century, and it is only in the 18th century that Dionysios of Fourna claimed that he was born in Thessaloniki, and to have derived some of the rules in his own work from him. Manuel has sometimes been tentatively equated with members of the Astrapas family, but without firm evidence. A 2024 handwriting analysis conducted on Panselinos' Protaton mural painting matched his handwriting with lettering on Marcian Codex GR 516, a manuscript attributed to Macedonian school painter Ioannis Astrapas, a relative of Michael and Eutychios Astrapas. Father Cosmas Simonopetritis, a former Mount Athos administrator, has suggested that Manuel Panselinos was a nickname adopted by Astrapas for his work.

Stylistically, art historians have pointed out a distinctive style in Manuel's works and striking similarities between various paintings attributed to him: their soft colors, the symmetrical rendering of the figures, and the uniqueness of form in compositions and proportions, especially in faces.

== Scientific research ==
Research on Athos has shown all of Manuel's purported paintings to be genuine works of his, including (but not limited to) the frescoes in the Protaton and the outer Narthex of the Katholikon of Vatopedi, the head of Saint Nicholas in the Katholikon of the Great Lavra (the body has been retouched), the portable icon of Saint Demetrios in the Great Lavra, and the two icons of Saint George in Vatopedi. Authentic works of his have also been located in monuments in Thessaloniki and other cities in Greek Macedonia.

== Gallery ==
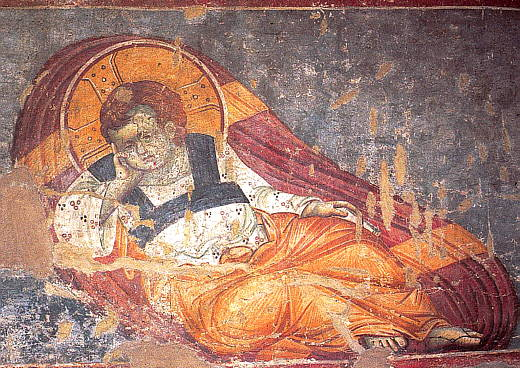
Jesus as a child, Protaton, Karyes

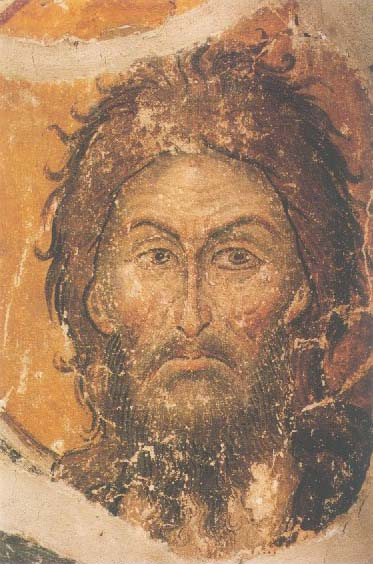
John the Baptist, Protaton, Karyes

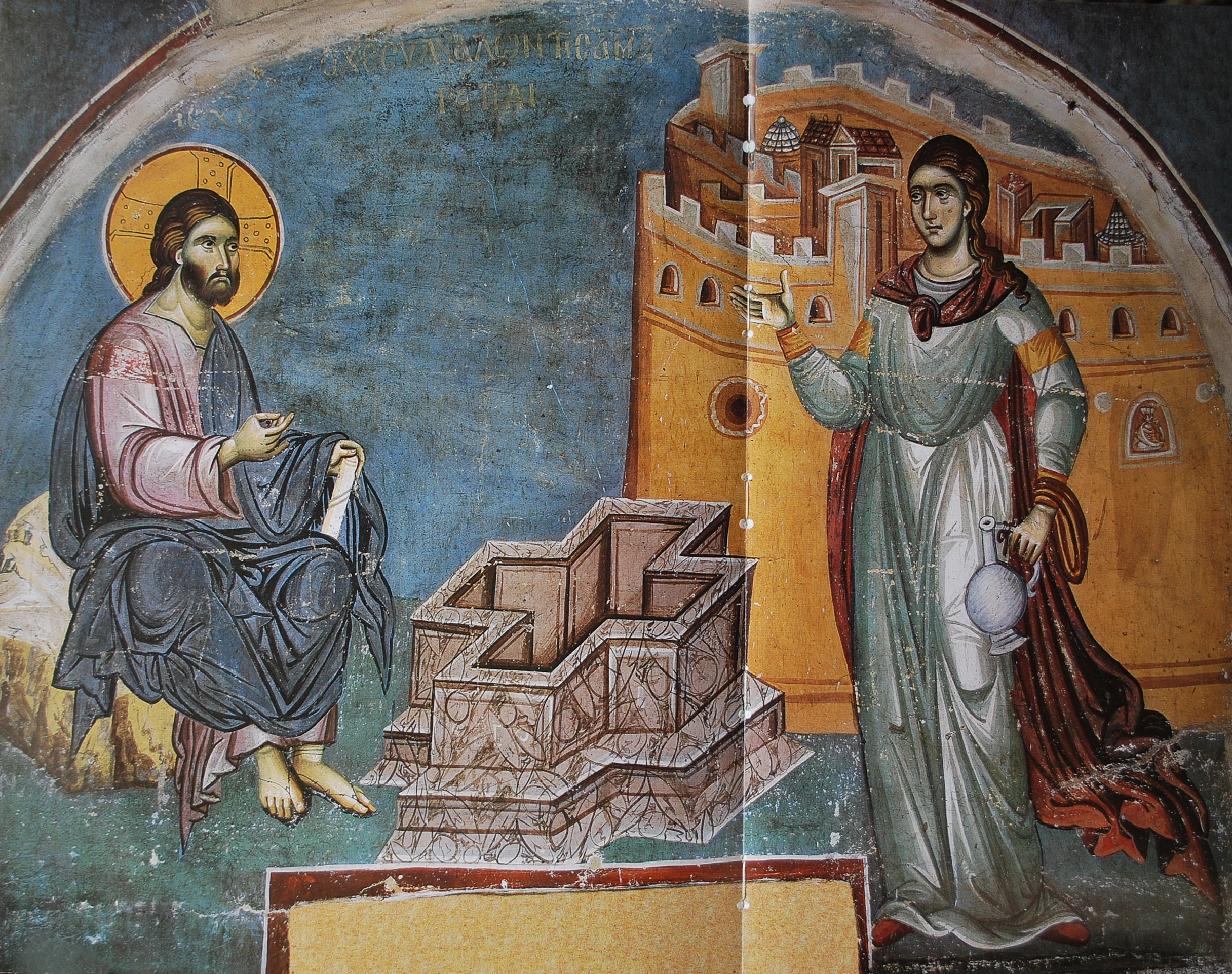
Jesus and Samaritan woman, Protaton, Karyes

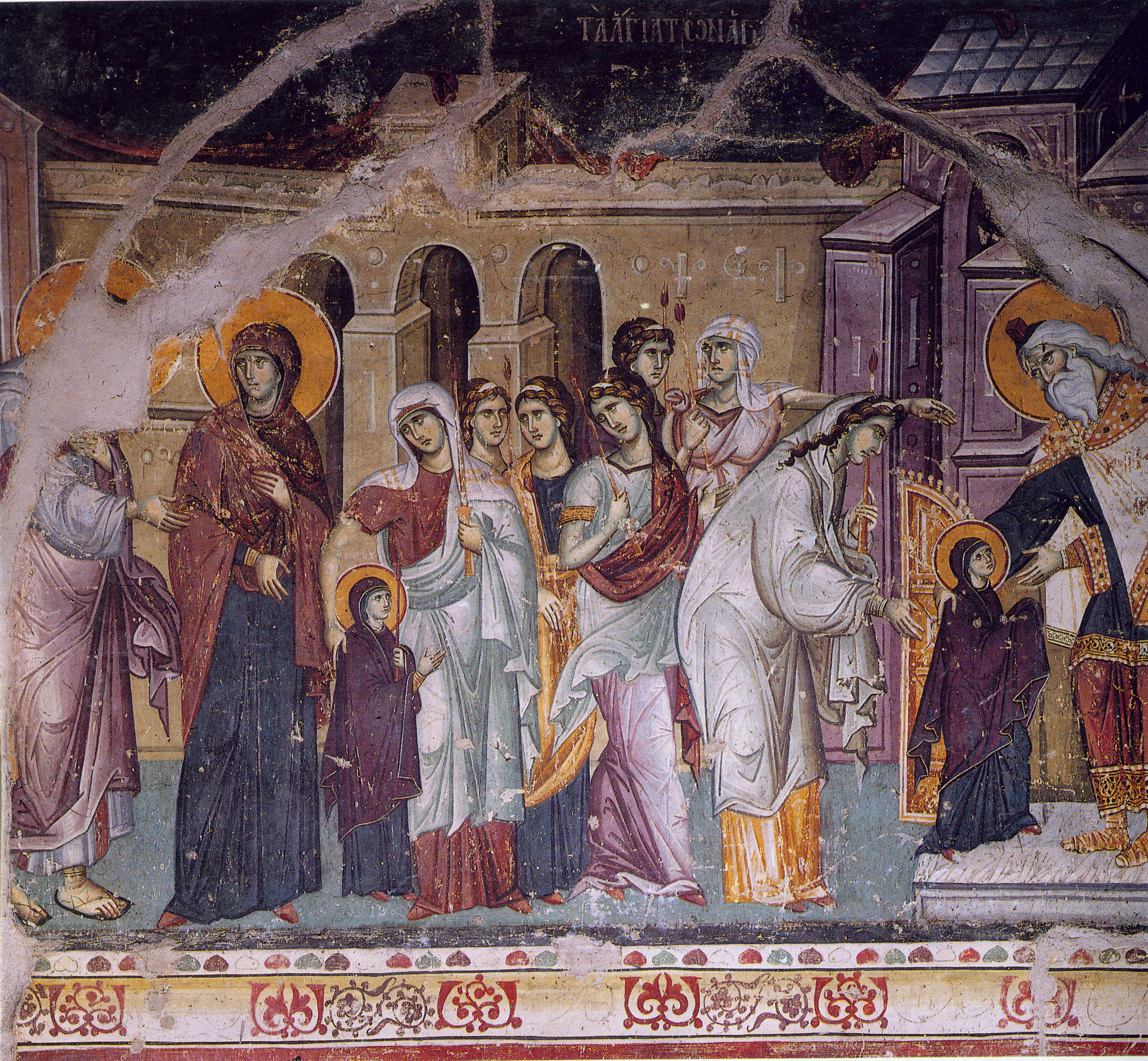
Presentation of Mary, Protaton, Karyes

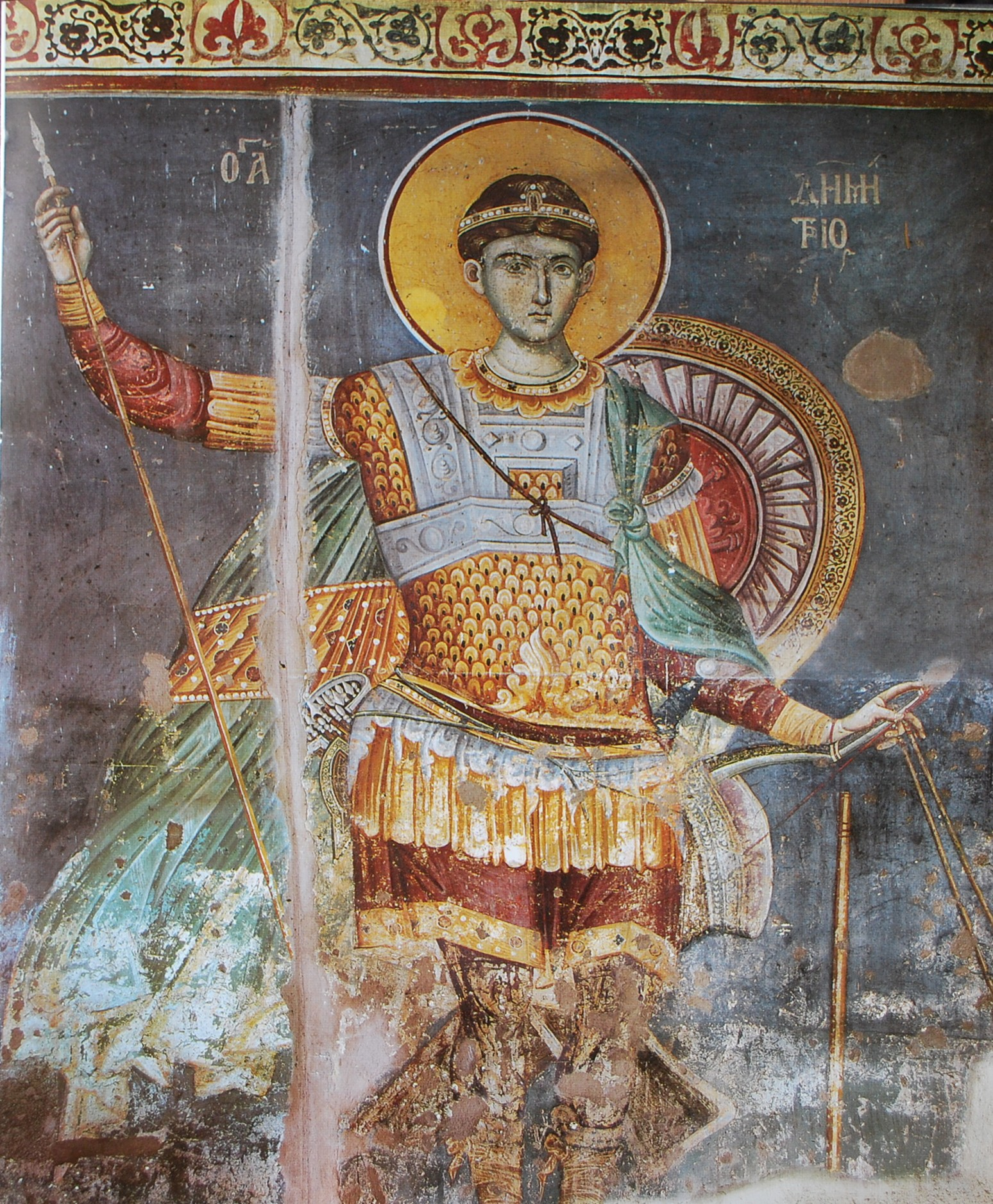
Saint Demetrius, Protaton, Karyes

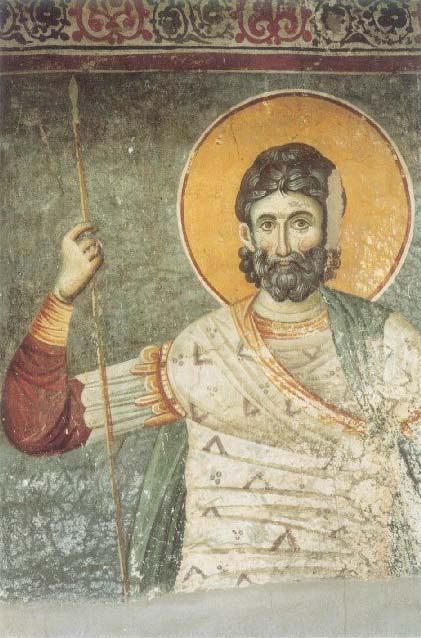
Saint Eustace, Protaton, Karyes

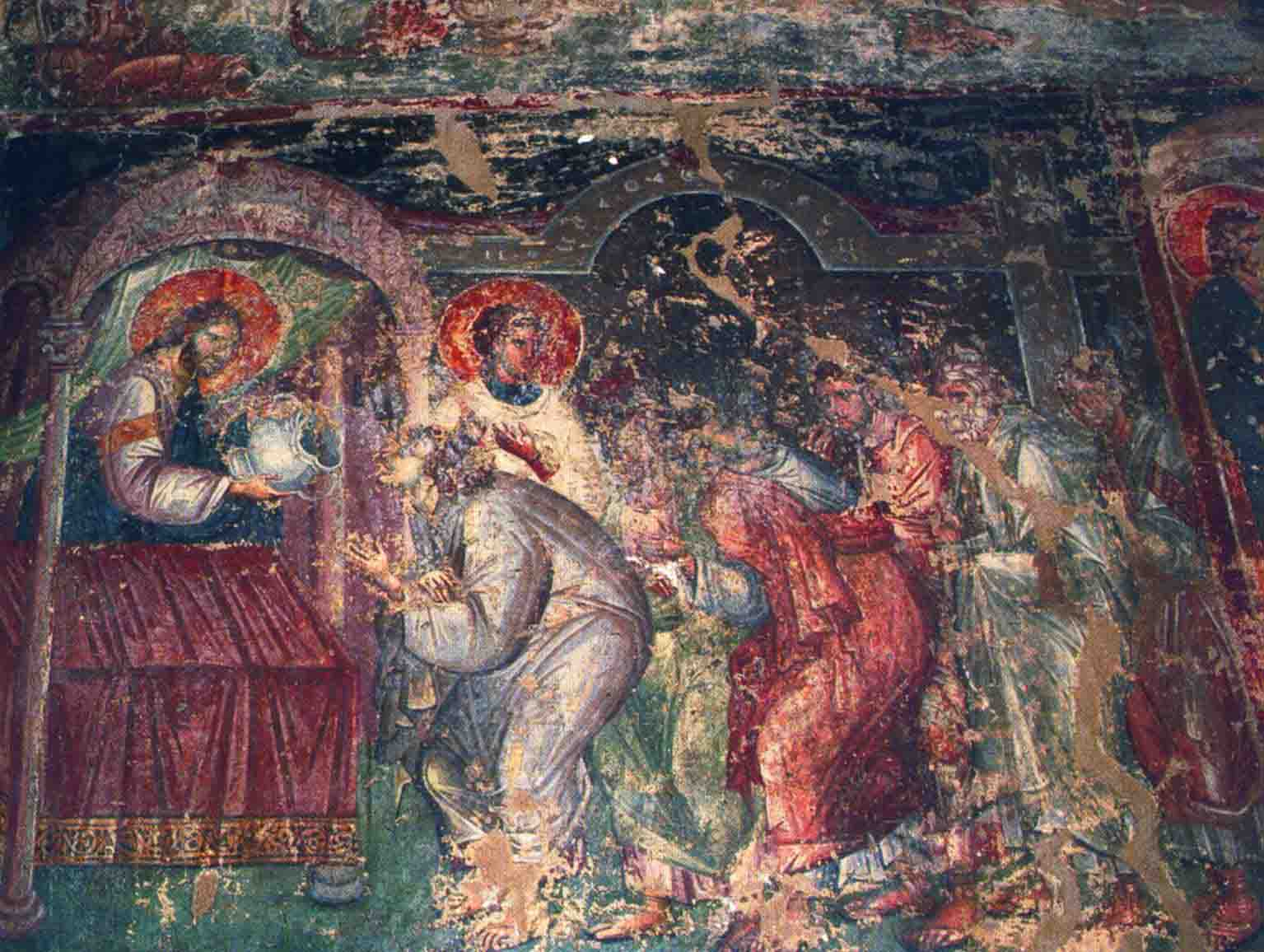
Fresco from Saint Euthymius chapel, Thessaloniki

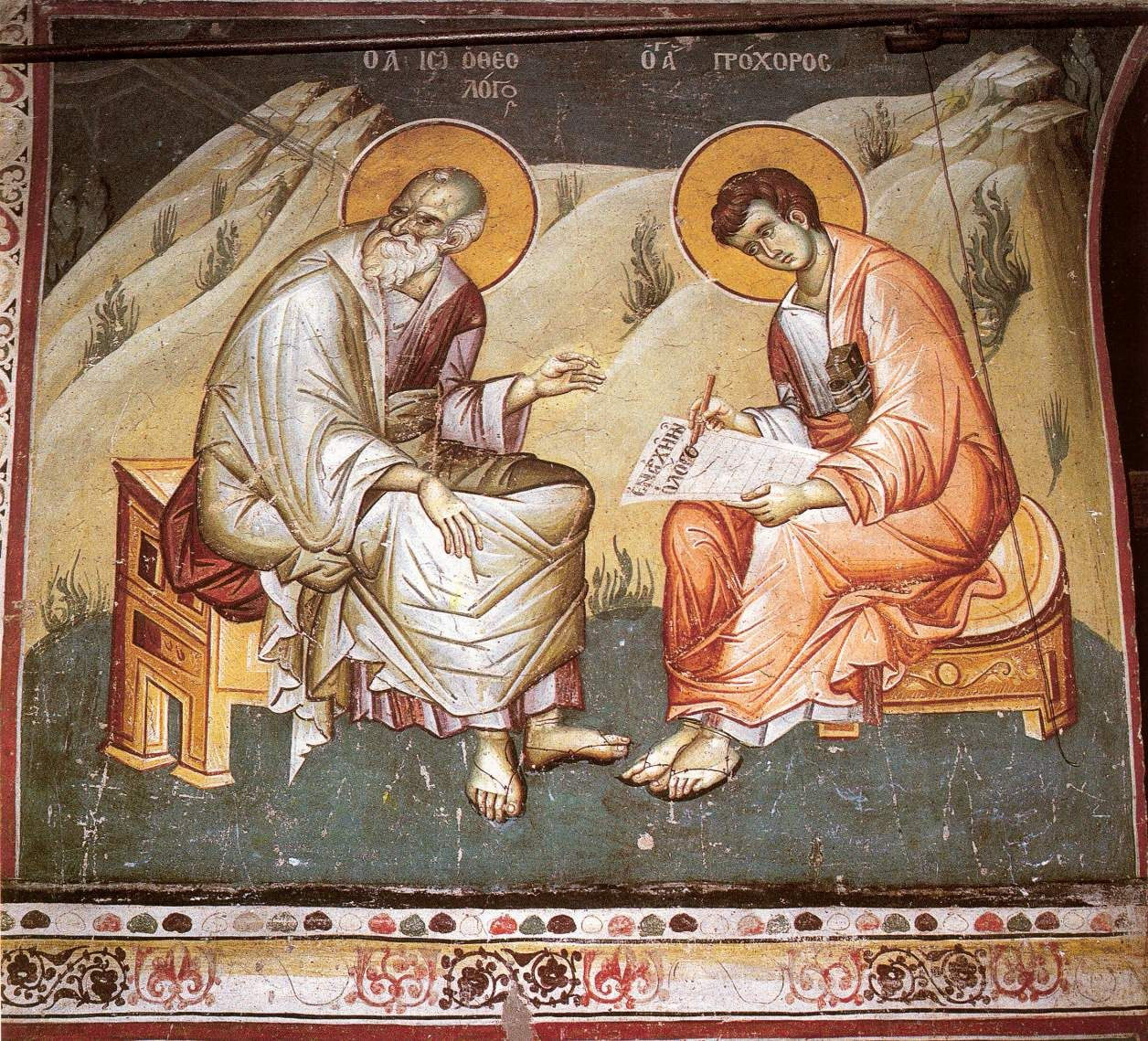
Saint John the Evangelist, Protaton, Karyes

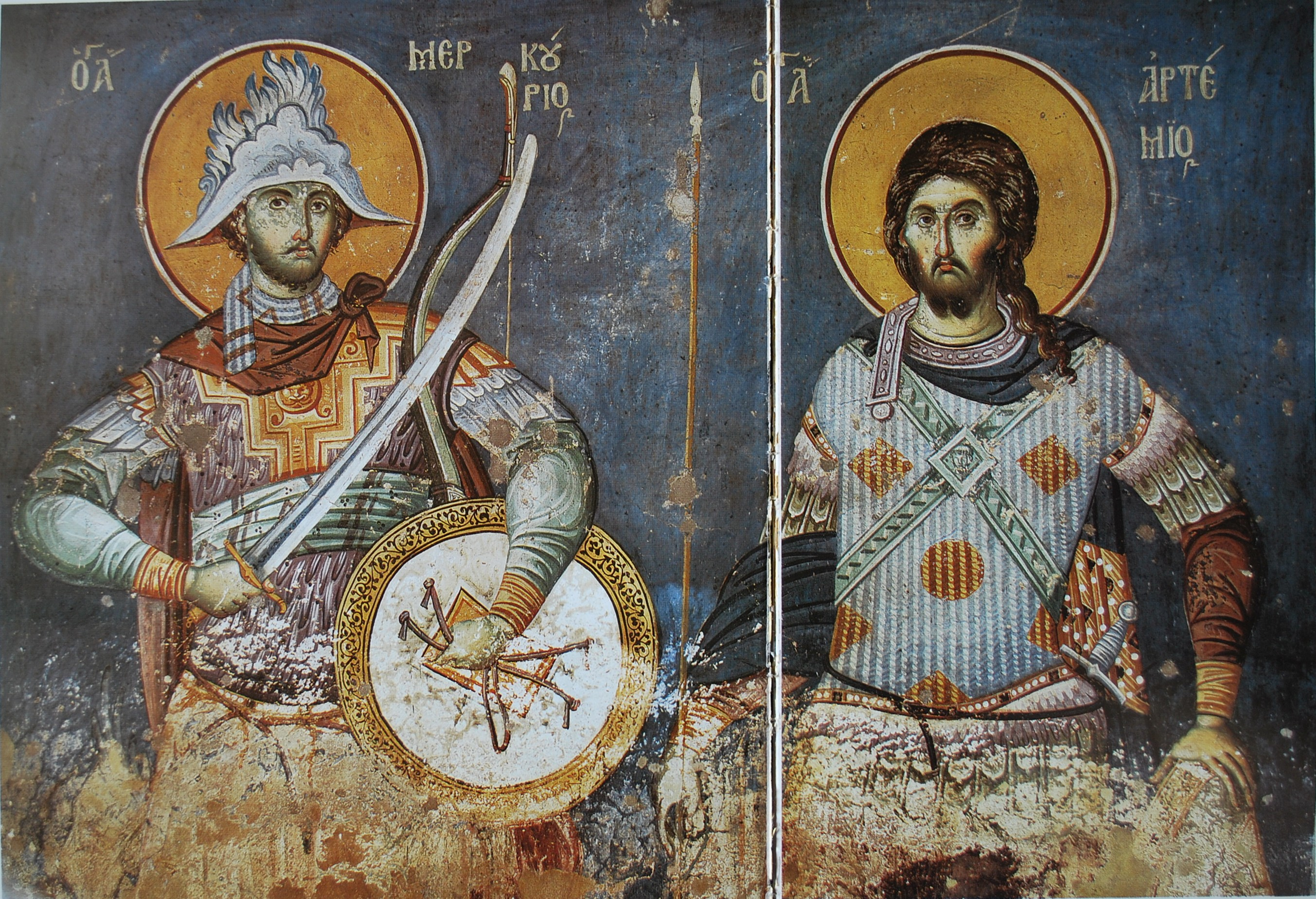
Saints Mercurius and Artemius of Antioch, Protaton, Karyes

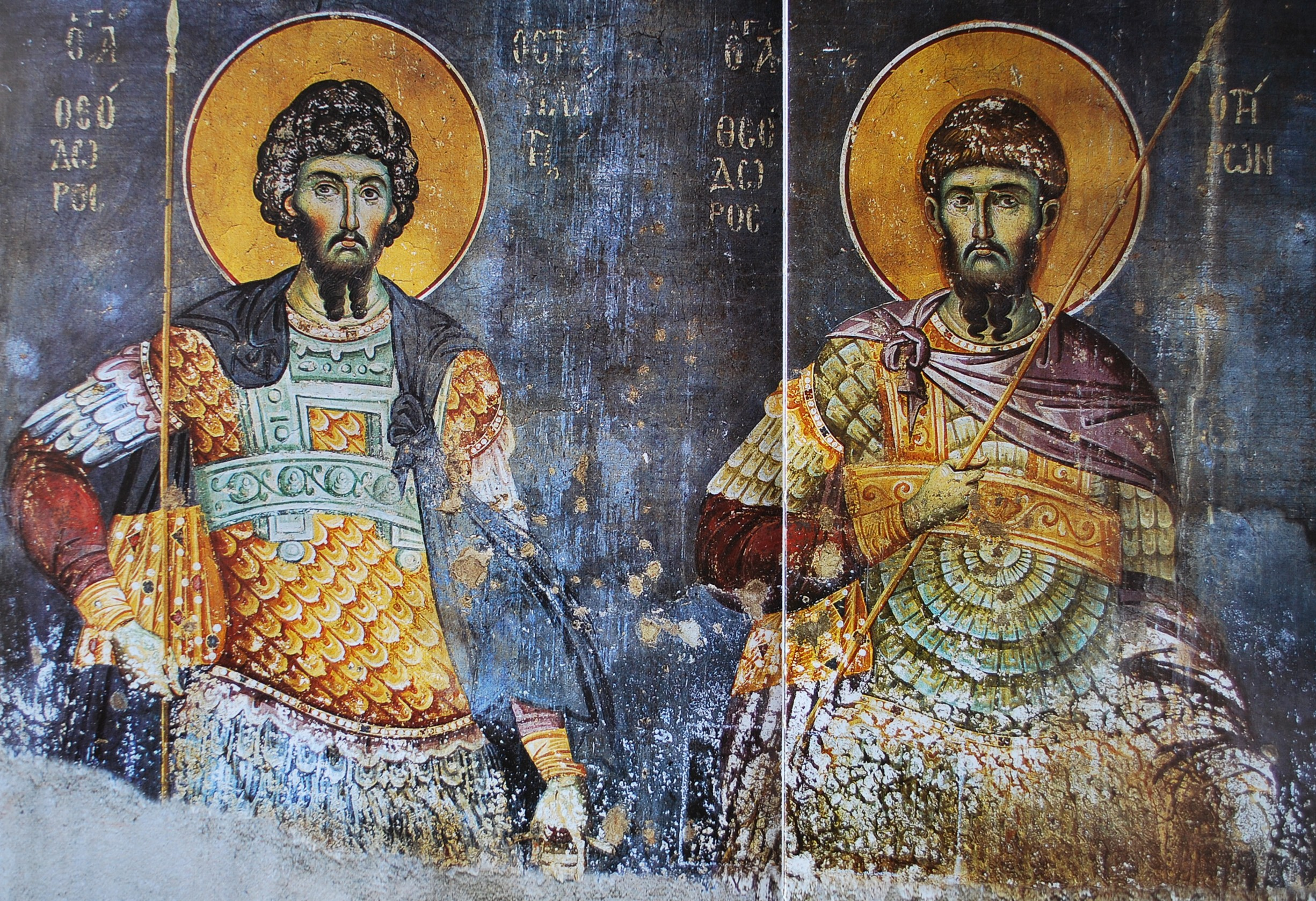
Saints Theodore Stratelates and Theodore Tyron, Protaton, Karyes

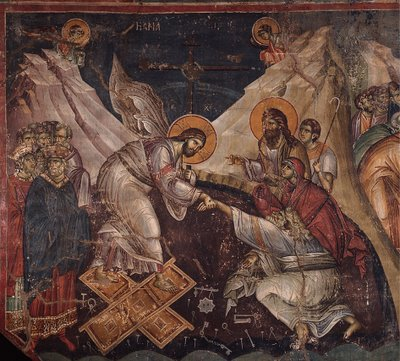
Resurrection of Christ, Protaton, Karyes

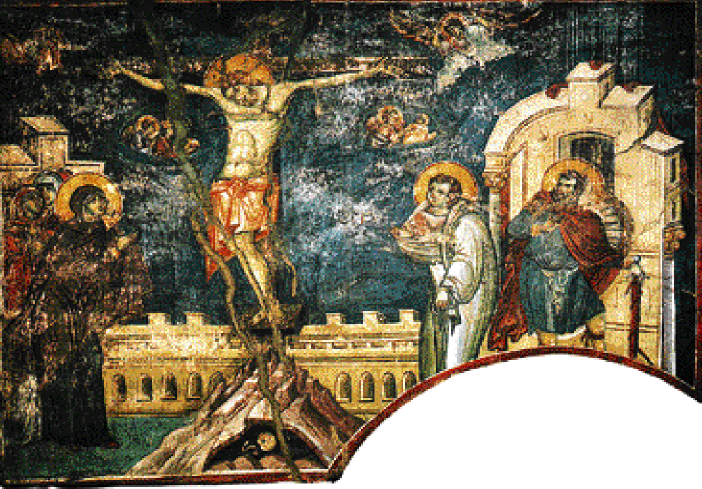
Crucifixion of Jesus, Protaton, Karyes

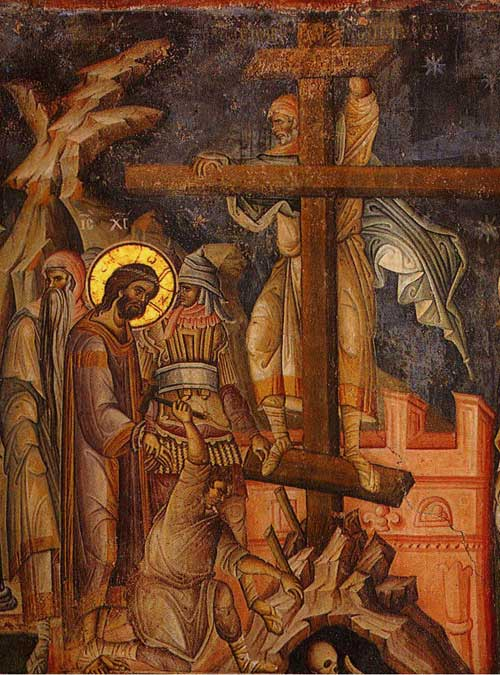
Jesus and the Cross, Protaton, Karyes

== See also ==
- Ioannis Pagomenos
- Theodore Apsevdis
