= Michele Greco da Valona =

Greek painter

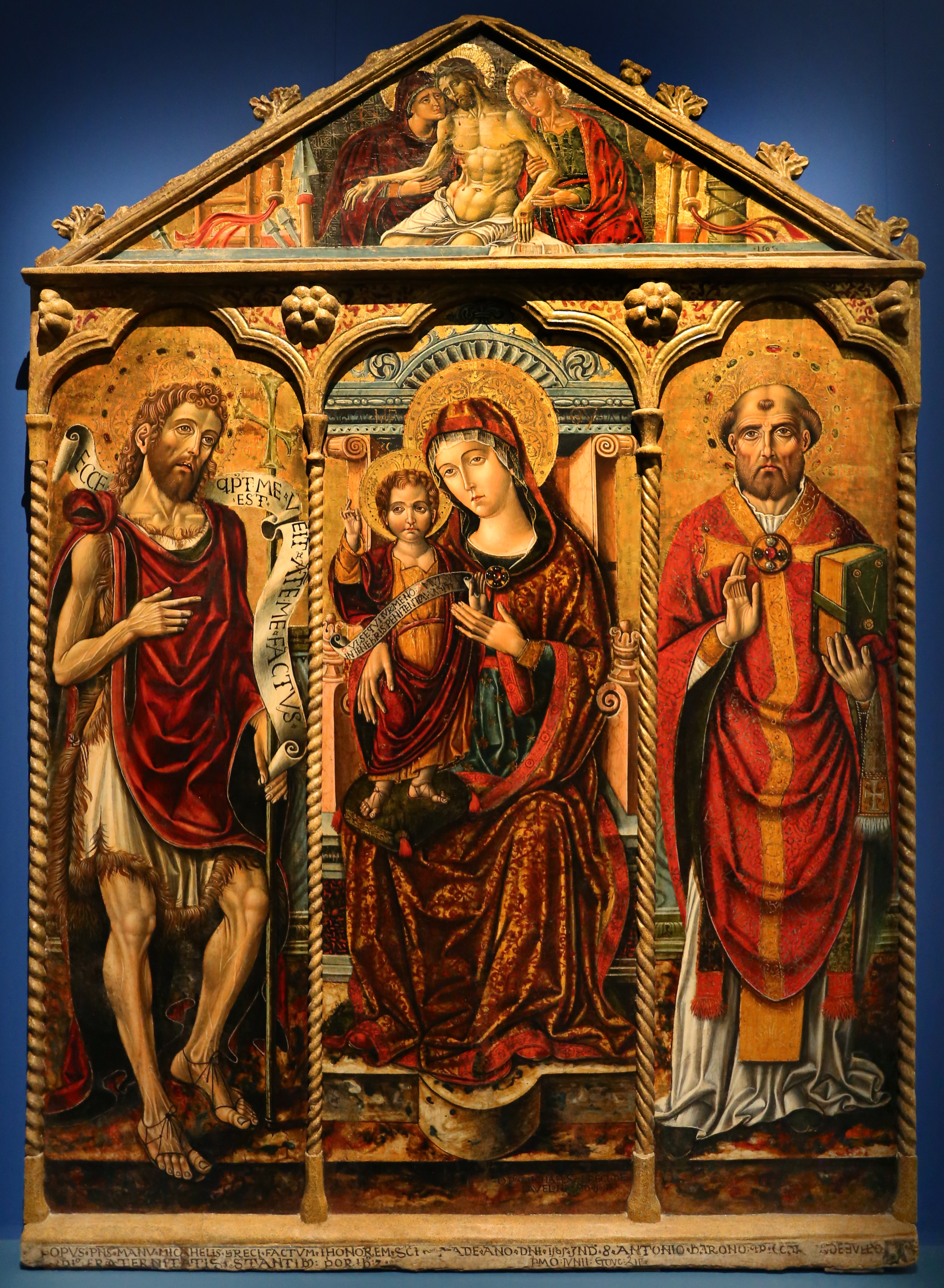
- Madonna col Bambino e Santi(Madonna and Child with Saints)
- Born: 15th Century; Vlorë, Albania
- Died: 16th Century
- Known for: Painting
- Movement: Adriatic Renaissance; Italian Renaissance

Michele Greco da Valona was a 15th/16th-century painter from Vlorë, in modern-day southern Albania. Michele represented the Adriatic renaissance. His art was similar to the style of Nicolaus Filantropinó, Fra Angelico, Paolo Uccello, Carlo Crivelli and Vincenzo de Rogata. Several of his works have survived, most notable of which is a controversial triptych featuring the Virgin Mary breastfeeding the people.

== History ==
Very little is known about Greco's background; we only have his signature on four paintings, where he identifies as "Greco da Valona". His ethnic origin is disputed. Vokotopoulos (1997) and Catalano (2019) support a Greek origin, Murolo (1992) and Koçollari (2018) support an Albanian origin. Between the 16th and 20th centuries, there were about a dozen artists who used the adjective Greco. Vokotopoulos claims that during the period that Michele Greco lived, the adjective was undeniably used to denote an ethnic Greek origin, and that it is only from the 17th century onwards that it was also used as a surname. Koçollari claims that the adjective Greco indicates the painter's religious affiliation. He was part of the refugees who migrated to Italy after the rise of the Ottoman Empire. Michele was active in Abruzzo and Molise. He is one of the few artists to have traveled all over Italy.

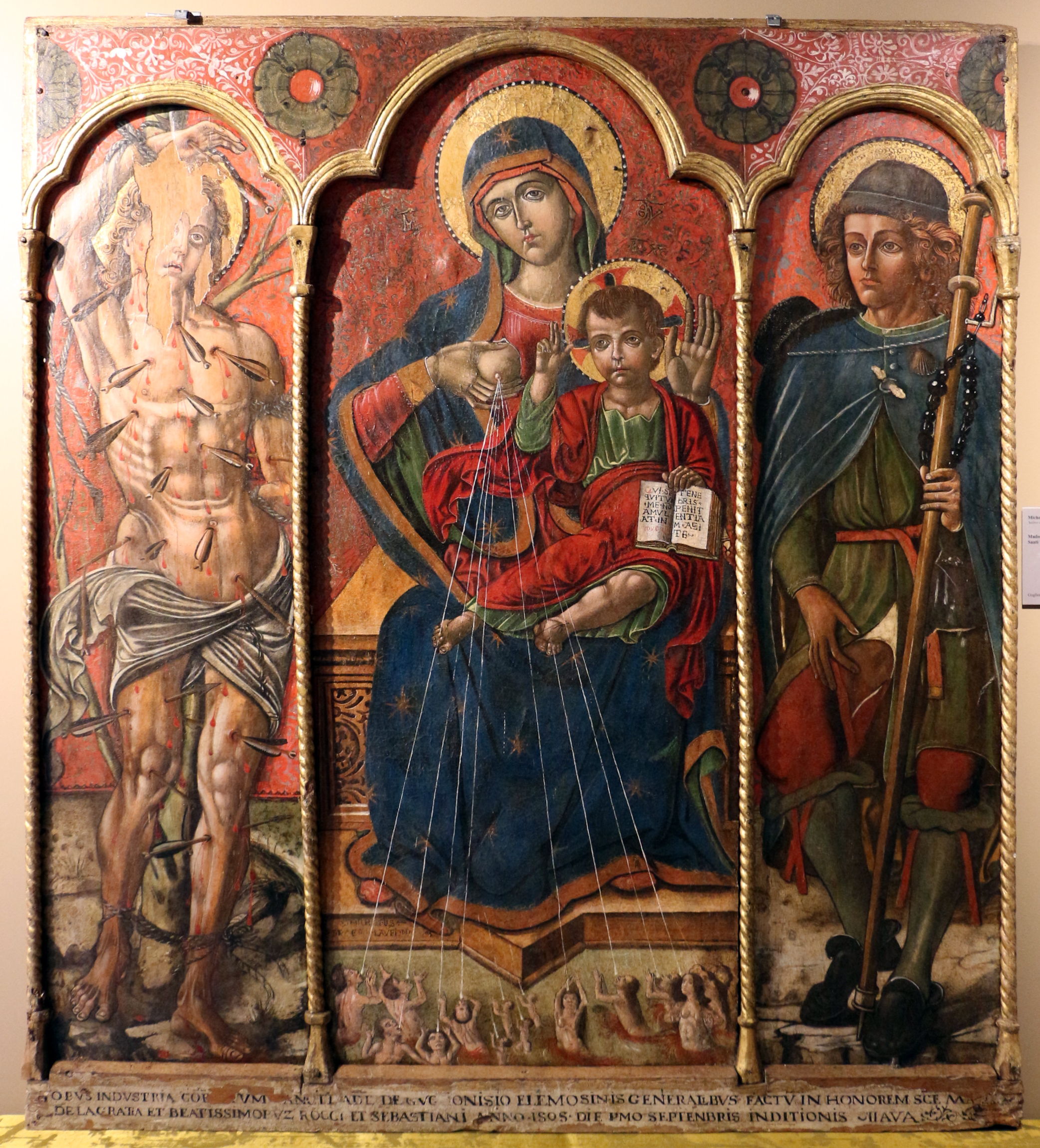
The Holy Shower

He was trained as a Byzantine master. As Michele's career progressed he sheds his Italo-Byzantine style and exhibits a more sophisticated Venetian style. There is also evidence he was influenced by Vincenzo de Rogata. The evidence is in the triptych from the San Bernardino coven in Salerno.

The painter's first work is a triptych he painted in 1505. It features the Madonna and Child between Saints John the Baptist and Adam, with a Pietà. The work was done for the church of Santa Maria Maggiore in Guglionesi and is now in the Aquila museum. His signature poem at the bottom of the triptych provides some information about the artist.

There are two other paintings in Guglionesi. One is dated 1505 and the other 1508. The earlier painting is the Madonna delle Grazie between Saints Rocco and Sebastiano. This work is very controversial because the Virgin is feeding breast milk to the people. Breast milk is reigning from the heavens. The painting has been featured in the Italian news on countless occasions. The final work dated 1508, featured Madonna between Saints Peter and Paul.

== Gallery ==
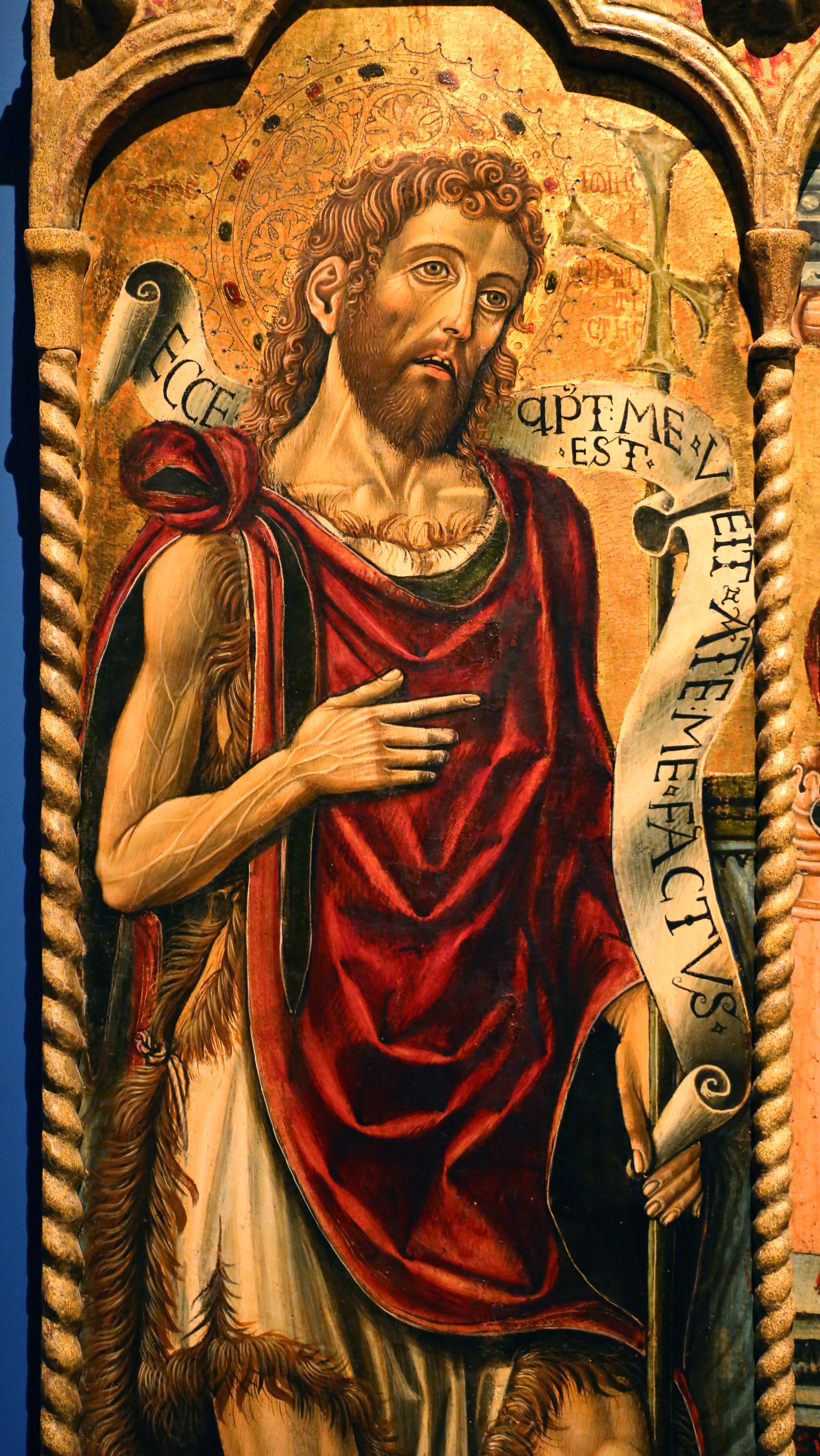
Close Up of John the Baptist

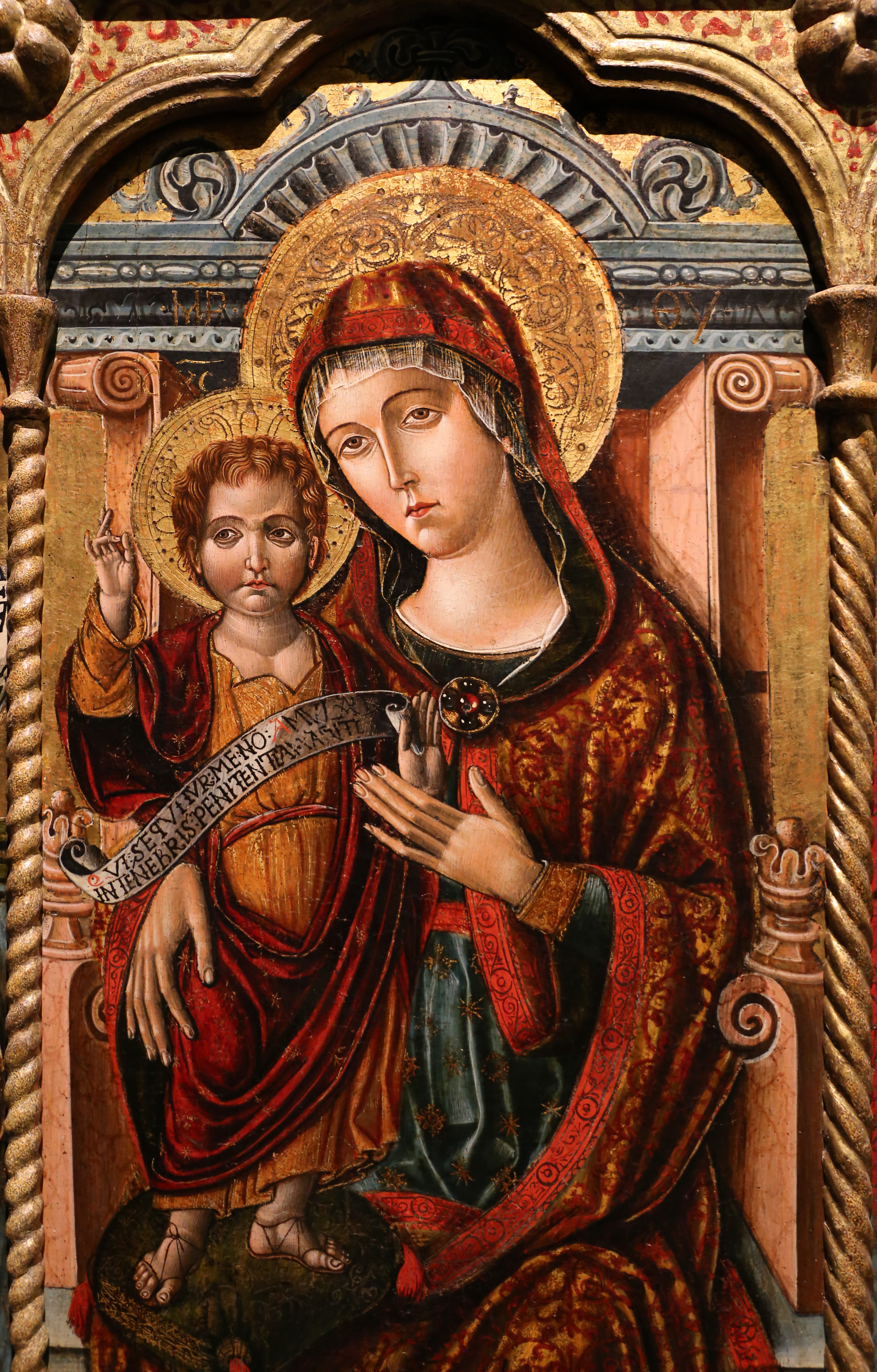
Close Up of Virgin and Child

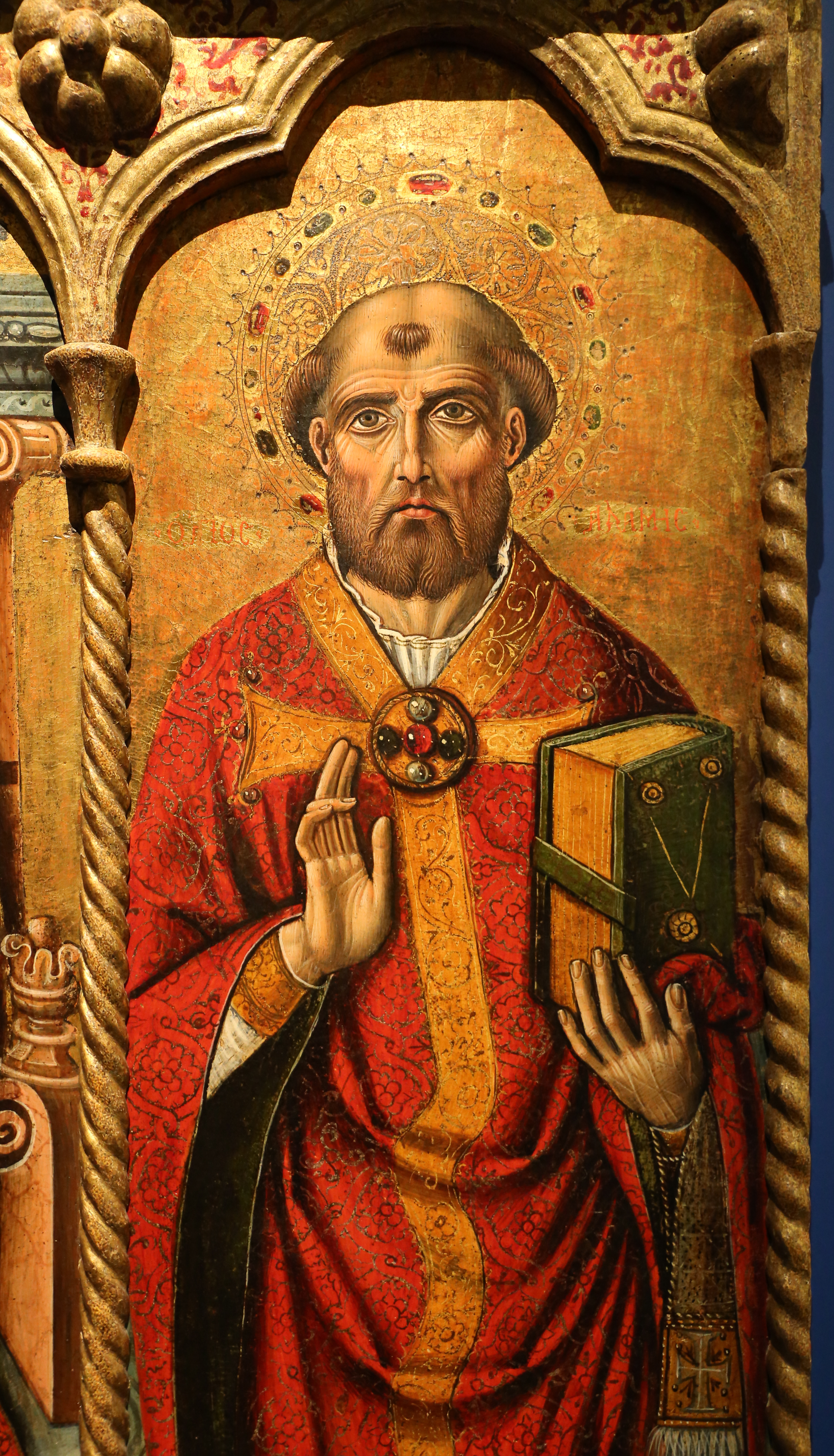
Clost Up of Saint Adam

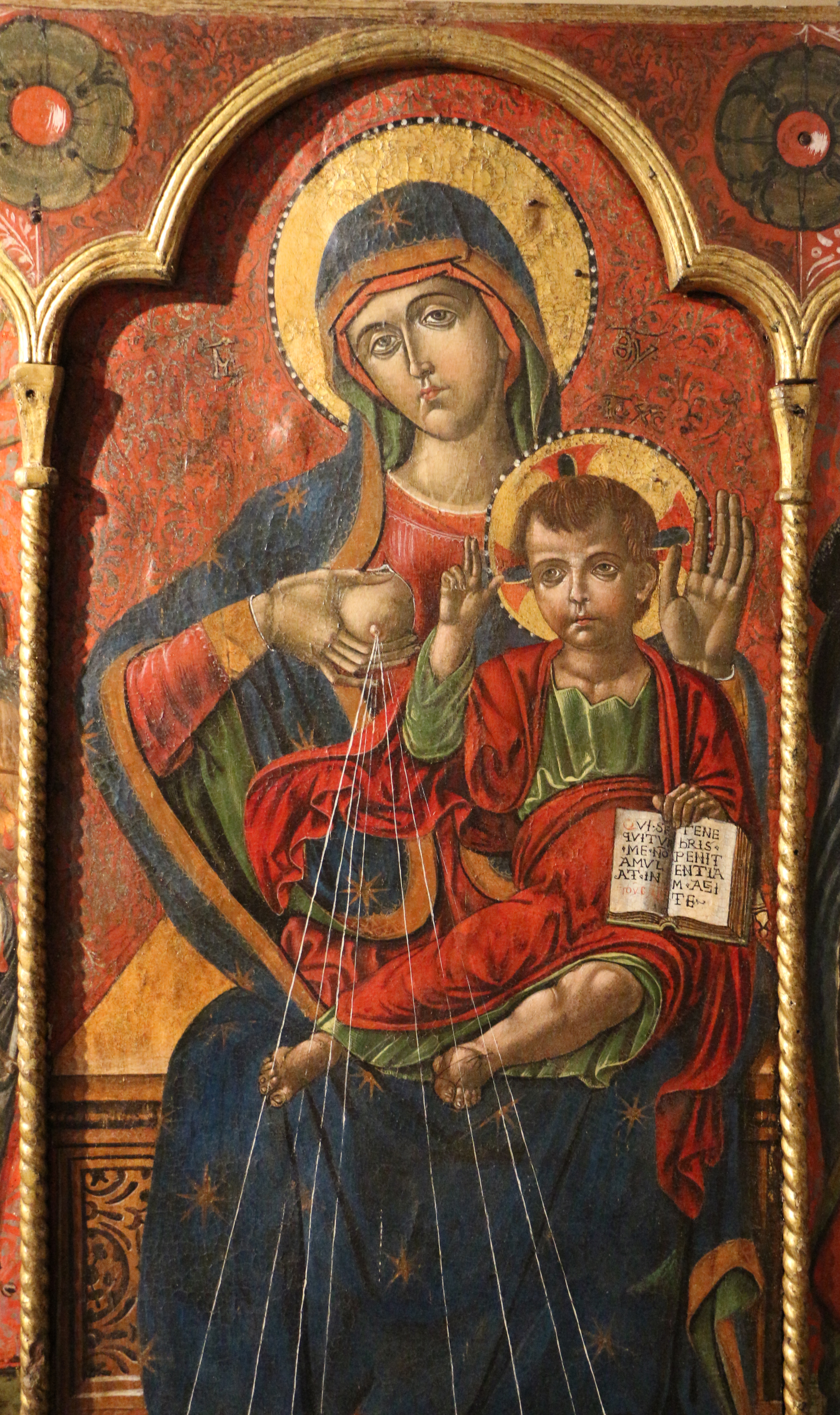
Close up of Holy Shower

== Bibliography ==
- Hatzidakis, Manolis; Drakopoulou, Evgenia (1997). Έλληνες Ζωγράφοι μετά την Άλωση (1450-1830). Τόμος 2: Καβαλλάρος - Ψαθόπουλος [Greek Painters after the Fall of Constantinople (1450-1830). Volume 2: Kavallaros - Psathopoulos]. Athens: Center for Modern Greek Studies, National Research Foundation. hdl:10442/14088. ISBN 960-7916-00-X.
- Vokotopoulos, Panagiotis (1997). "Michele Greco: ένας άγνωστος ζωγράφος της διασποράς". Thesaurismata (in Greek). 27. Venice: Istituto Ellenico di Studi Bizantini e Postbizantini: 139–146. ISSN 0082-4097.
- Catalano, Dora (2011). "Michele Greco da Valona, un artista albanese sulle coste del Molise". In Arbace, Lucia; Ferrara, Daniele (eds.). Il Rinascimento Danzante: Michele Greco da Valona e gli artisti dell'Adriatico tra Abruzzo e Molise (in Italian). Umberto Allemandi & C. pp. 17–25. ISBN 9788842220688.
- Catalano, Dora (2019). "Guardando a levante: Pittura post-bizantinanel Meridione d'Italia e altri fatti adriatici". In Catalano, Dora; Ceriana, Matteo; de Castris, Pierluigi Leone; Ragozzino, Marta (eds.). Rinascimentovisto da Sud. Matera, l'Italiameridionalee il Mediterraneotra '400 e '500 (in Italian). artem. pp. 129–139. ISBN 9788856906813.
