= Georgios Kalliergis =

Byzantine Greek painter (c.1300s–c.1400s)

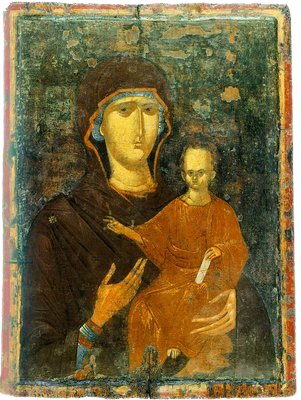
- Theotokos Hodegetria
- Born: 13th century Thessaloniki, Greece
- Died: 14th century Thessaloniki, Greece
- Known for: Fresco painting
- Movement: Macedonian school

Georgios Kalliergis or Kallergis (Greek: Γεώργιος Καλλ[ι]έργης, 13th century – 14th century) was a Byzantine Greek painter. He is one of the few Greek painters of the Byzantine empire known by name. Other Byzantine painters include: Theodore Apsevdis, Kokkinobaphos Master, and Ioannis Pagomenos. Kalliergis was one of the masters of Thessaloniki. He was part of the Macedonian School of painting. His last name Kallergis was associated with a noble family from the island of Crete. Two other very famous Greek painters Nikolaos Kallergis and Christodoulos Kalergis shared the same last name. Georgios was associated with Mount Athos, Veria, and Thessaloniki. His most notable frescos are in the Church of the Resurrection of Christ in Veria, Greece.

== History ==
He was born in Thessaloniki sometime in the 13th century. He was a very prominent painter. Records exist about the painter at Mount Athos, Thessaloniki, and Veria. His family name was very important. The family name Kallergis was affiliated with the island of Crete. They were nobles. The original family name was Phokas. The name was changed to Kallergis during the Venetian dominion over Crete. There is a strong resemblance between Manuel Fokas's fresco painting of the Crucifixion in Crete and the Kalliergis Crucifixion.

A famous poet from Thessaloniki named Manuel Philis wrote a poem about one of his paintings. Historians have deduced that Kalliergis lived and worked in the region. Some historians believe he was a student of famous painter Manuel Panselinos. The figures of Joseph in the Nativity of Christ in the Church of the Resurrection of Christ, Veria, are similar to the work of Manuel Panselinos. Kalliergis does not follow the style of the first phase of the Palaeologan Renaissance.

In a document discovered at Mount Athos in the monastery of Hilandar. On November 9, 1322, Kalliergis witnessed the sale of three houses in Thessaloniki to some monks from Mount Athos. Kalliergis proudly signed his paintings. According to an inscription Kalliergis refers to himself as the greatest painter in all of Thessaly. His work is dated around 1315.

== Painting style ==
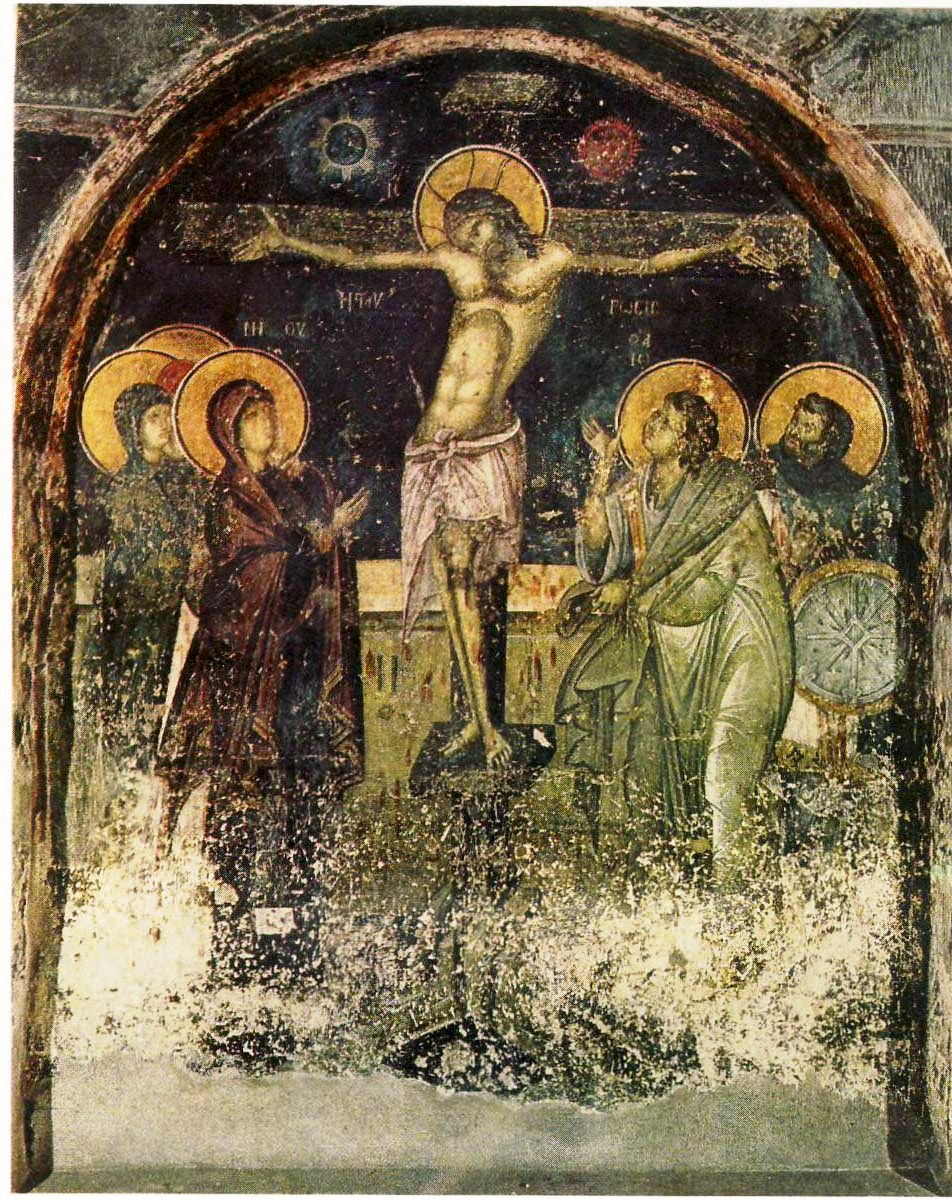
Crucifixion Georgios Kalliergis

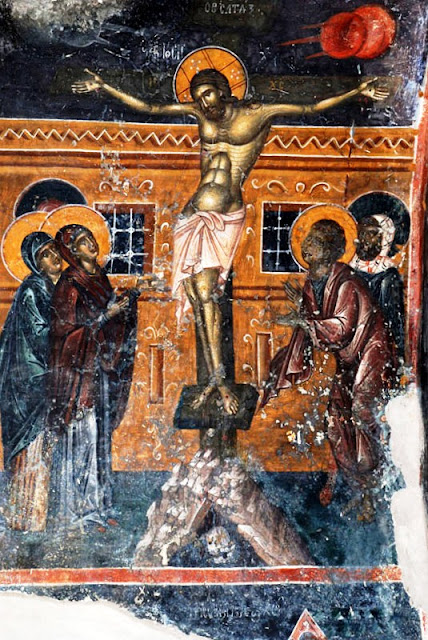
Crucifixion Manuel Fokas

His work follows the traditional prototype of Greek-Italian Byzantine art. His name was common in Cretan noble circles. Cretan painter Manuel Fokas may have been influenced by his work or possibly be one of his descendants. The Fokas family consisted of a large number of fresco painters in Crete.

Clearly, the two Crucifixions exhibit many similarities. Both backgrounds feature planets. There are four figures visiting the Crucifixion of Christ. His head is tilted left in both frescos. The building behind the cross is closer in the Fokas version. Both Fokas and Kalliergis Crucifixion influenced Cretan artists.

Frescos completed by Theophanes the Cretan testify to the influence of the craftsmanship of Byzantine masters. Pavias's Crucifixion was also influenced by local Cretan artists and the new movement in Italian art. Italian painters Cimabue and Duccio were active during the same period. Clearly, Kalliergis influenced countless Greek and Italian painters.

Kalliergis has a painting of the Virgin and Child Hodogatria attributed to him. The art form was the framework for the Cretan School. Countless artists were influenced by the style namely: Angelos Akotantos, Nikolaos Tzafouris, Nikolaos Lampoudis and Andreas Ritzos.

== Gallery ==
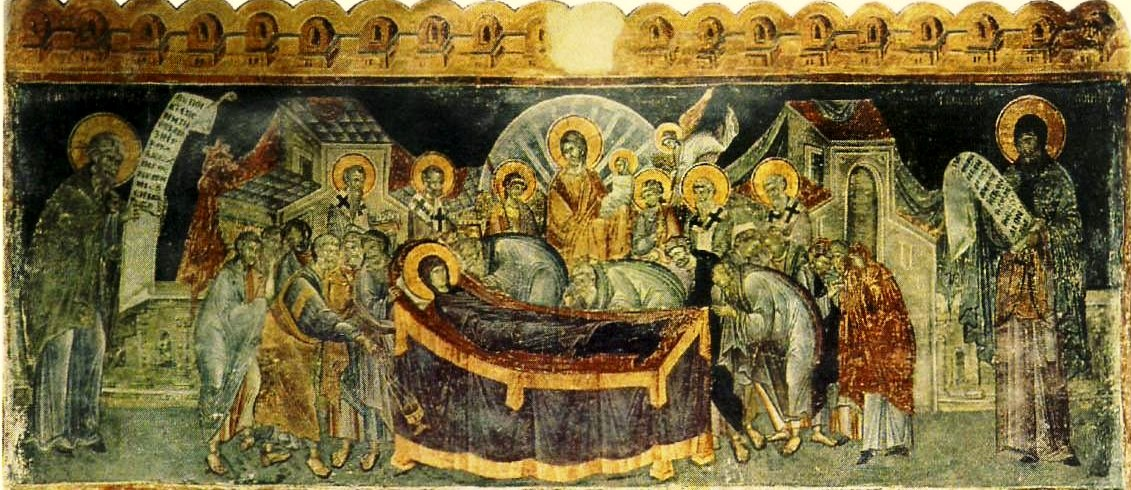
Dormition of Virgin Mary

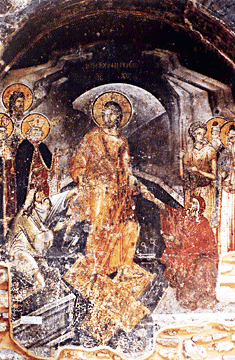
Resurrection Fresco
