= Manuel Fokas =

Greek Byzantine painter (c. 1400 – after 1454)

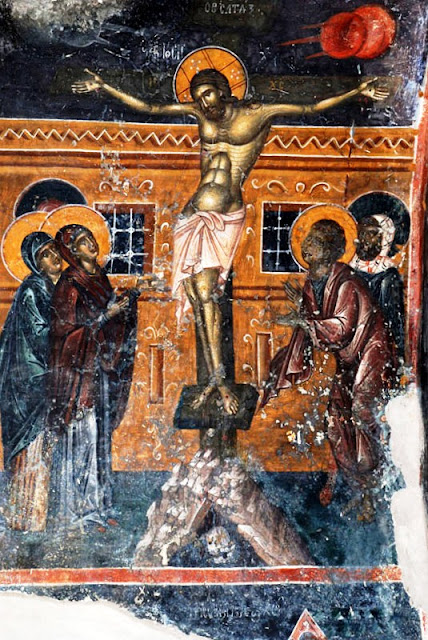
- Crucifixion
- Born: c. 1400; Heraklion, Greece
- Died: after 1453; Heraklion, Greece
- Known for: Fresco painting
- Movement: Cretan School; Palaeologan Renaissance

Manuel Fokas (Greek: Μανουήλ Φωκάς; 1400 – after 1454), also known as Manuele Fuca, was a Byzantine Greek painter. Most of his frescos have survived until today. Three churches in Crete containing Fokas's frescos are Saint George, Emparaso, Agios Konstantinos Avdou, and Saint George Apano Symi. Artists from Heraklion that his work influenced include: El Greco, Georgios Klontzas and Michael Damaskinos.

== History ==
Manuel was born in Heraklion. His father's name was Stamatis. His brother was painter Ioannis Fokas; they worked together. The entire family was known for mural painting. Both artists were also affiliated with Michael and Georgios Fokas. The family was also associated with painter Andreas Pavias. The family name Phokas was important during the Byzantine Empire.

The Phokas name changed to Kallergis during the Venetian dominion over Crete. Manuel and his family were well-known Fresco painters during the 15th and 16th centuries in Crete.

Fokas painted frescos in three churches between 1436 and 1454. The first church he frescoed was Saint George (Agios Georgios) in Emparaso, Heraklion, Crete. His signature "διά χειρός έμοϋ άμαθη Μανουήλ (by the hand of humbled Manuel)" can be found in the first church. The frescos consist of the rising of Lazarus and the Resurrection of Jesus. In a detail of the Pentecost, there is also a man who symbolizes the world with twelve scrolls. The date on the murals is between 1436 and 1437.

The second church Manuel was associated with was Agios Konstantinos in Avdou Pediados, Heraklion Crete. He frescoed the church with his brother Ioannis The signature poem found at the location was: "διά χειρός κάμοΰ ά(μαρτ)ολοϋ καί άτέχνον Μανονήλ καί 'Ιωάννου των Φωκάδων. Εύχεστε υπέρ υμών διά τόν Κύριον (by the hand of a sinner and humbled artist Manuel and Ioannis Fokas. Wish you well in the name of the Lord)". They painted in the typical style of the period. The church features frescos of the Virgin Mary. They are in good condition, some parts were not well preserved. The second church serves as a demonstration of the final period in the palaeologan renaissance. The date on the murals is between 1445 and 1446.

The final church with his signature was Saint George (Agios Georgios), Apano Symi, Viannos, Heraklion, Crete. This work took place after the fall of the Byzantine Empire. He records the event in his signature poem: "μετά την άλωσιν της Κωνσταντινουπόλεως διά χειρός Φωκά Μανουήλ (after the fall of Constantinople by the hand of Fokas Manuel)". The third church is wonderfully preserved. Frescos of the Pantocrator, the Crucifixion, and the Twelve Apostles are clearly visible. The Crucifixion bears similarities to the work of Thessaloniki master Georgios Kalliergis. The date on the murals was after 1453.

== Painting style ==
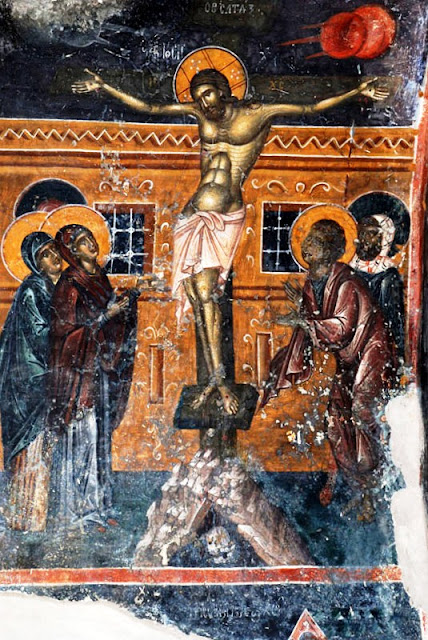
Manuel Fokas

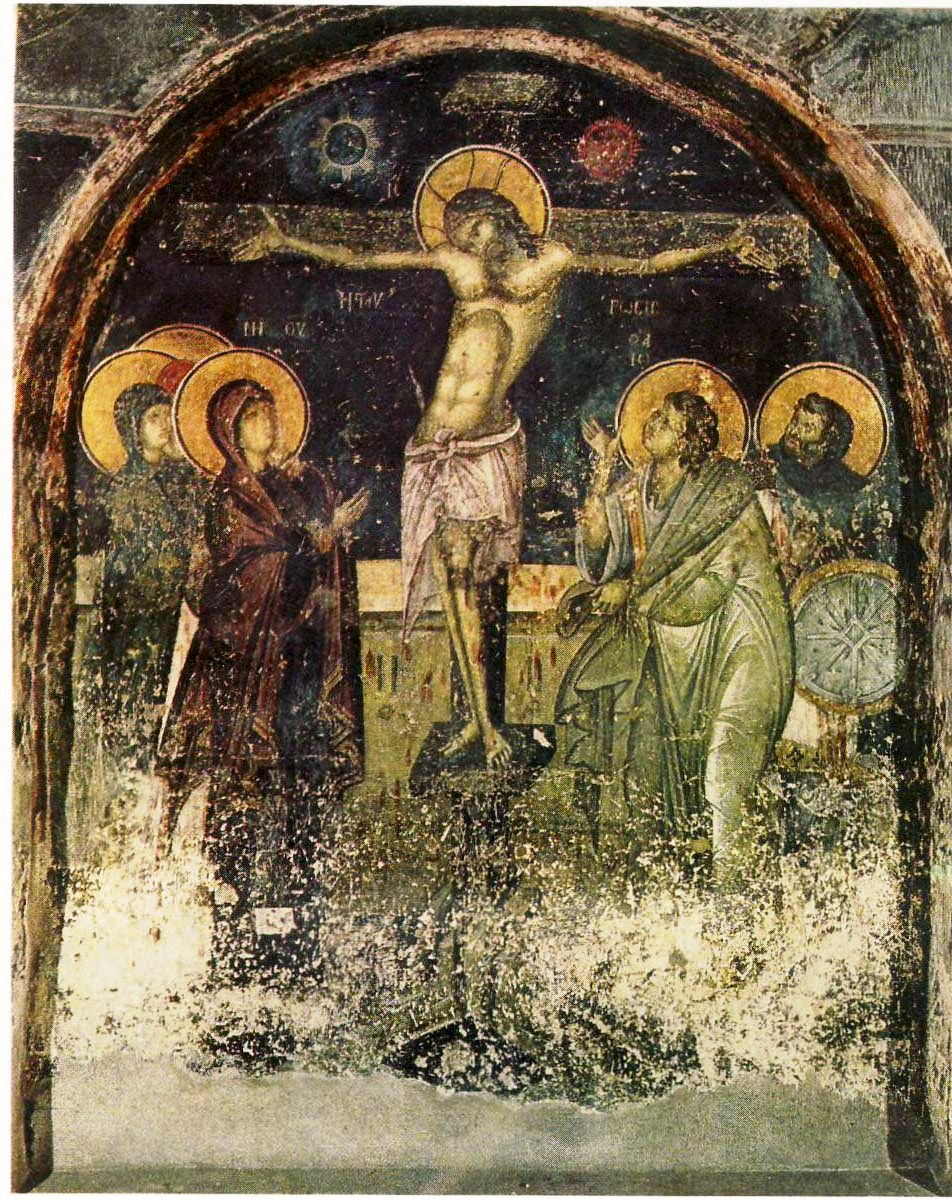
Georgios Kalliergis

Some of his work resembled the traditional prototype of Greek-Italian Byzantine art. His work resembled the technique of Georgios Kalliergis, he may have been one of his descendants. Some of the frescos exhibit similarities. Four figures surround the Crucifixion of Christ, there are also planets in the background of both paintings. The figure of Christ and his stance are far too similar. The direct similarities of Georgios Kalliergis and Fokas's work create a substantial argument for a familial relationship. Ioannis Pagomenos's frescos can also be compared to the work of the Fokas family. Pagomenos completed many frescos on the same island.

Other local artists such as Theophanes the Cretan testify to the influence of the craftsmanship of Byzantine masters. Pavias's Crucifixion also was influenced by local Cretan artists and the new movement in Italian art. Italian painters Fra Angelico and Giotto painted in a similar style. Clearly, Fokas influenced countless Greek and Italian painters. Some of the artists included Emmanuel Lambardos, Antonios Papadopoulos, and Angelos Pitzamanos.

== Gallery ==
=== Church of Saint George, Emparaso Site ===
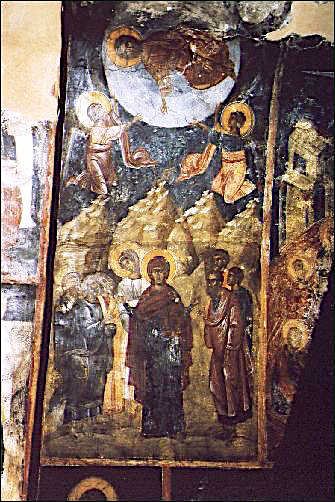
Ascension of Christ

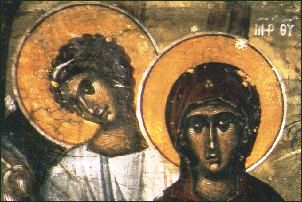
Close Up of Ascension of Christ

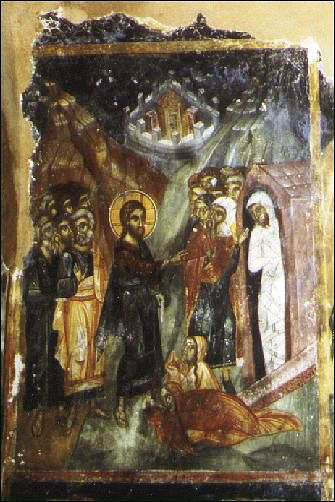
Raising of Lazarus

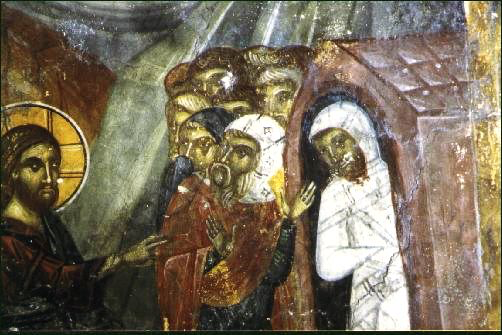
Close Up Raising of Lazarus

=== Church of Agios Konstantinos Avdou Pediados Site ===
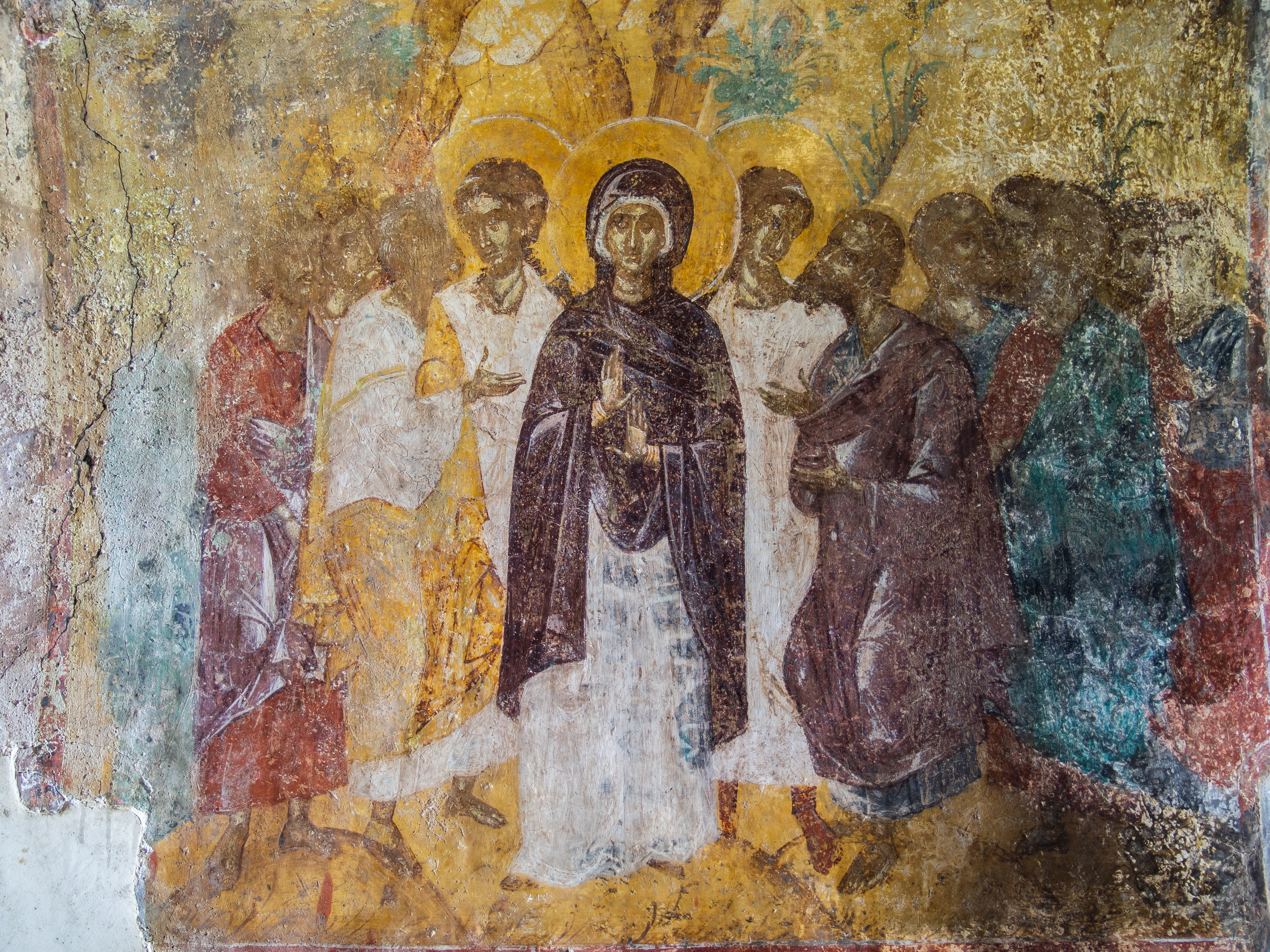
Fresco with the Virgin Mary

=== Church of Saint George Apano Symi Site ===
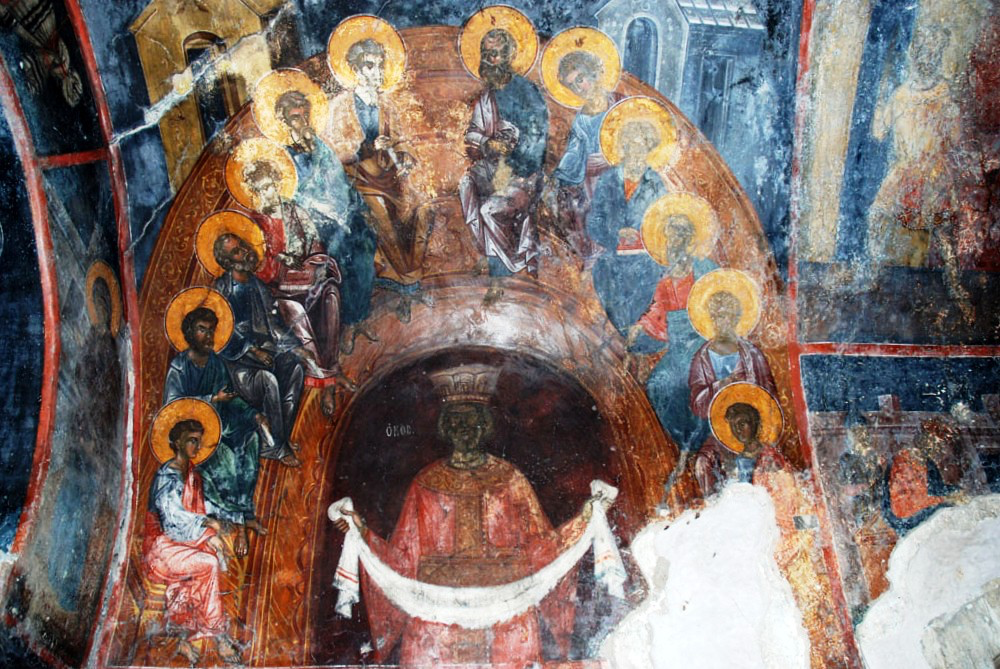
Twelve Apostles

== See also ==
- Angelos Akotantos

== Bibliography ==
- Hatzidakis, Manolis; Drakopoulou, Evgenia (1997). Έλληνες Ζωγράφοι μετά την Άλωση (1450-1830). Τόμος 2: Καβαλλάρος - Ψαθόπουλος [Greek Painters after the Fall of Constantinople (1450-1830). Volume 2: Kavallaros - Psathopoulos]. Athens: Center for Modern Greek Studies, National Research Foundation. hdl:10442/14088. ISBN 960-7916-00-X.
