= Alberto Sotio =

Italian painter

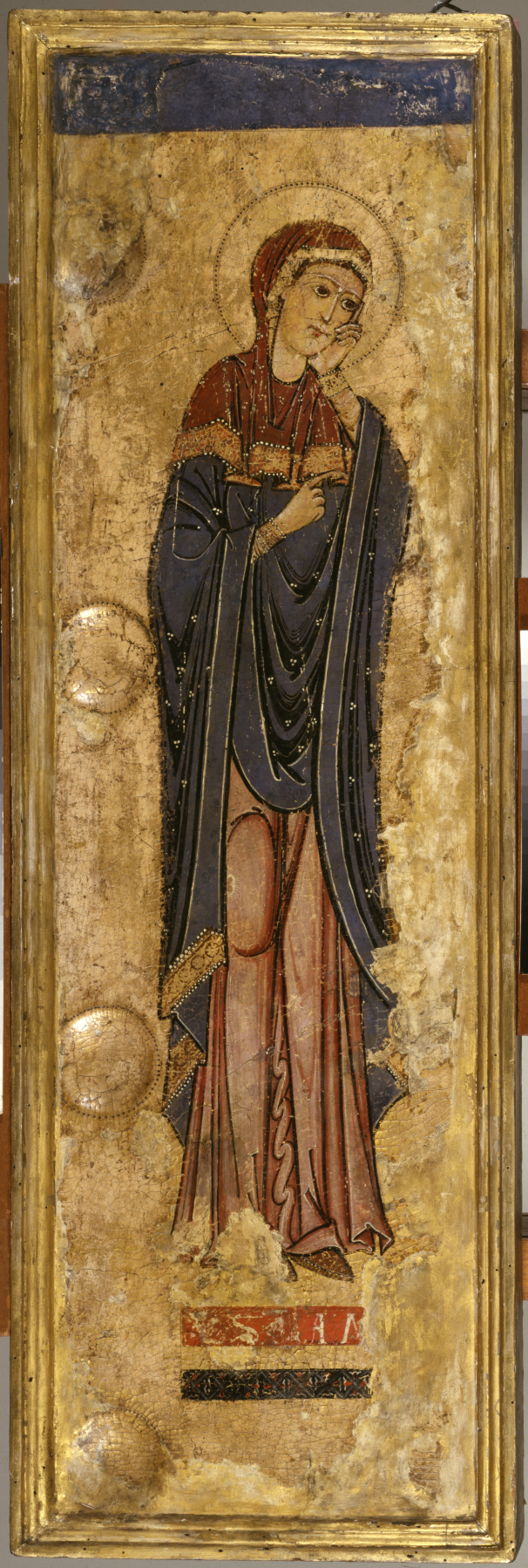
The Mourning Virgin Mary by Alberto Sotio, fragment from the left side of a large painted crucifix, Walters Art Museum, between 1180 and 1190

Alberto Sotio (... - fl. 1187), also Alberto Sozio, was an Italian painter and illuminator of medieval art from Spoleto, active during the second half of the twelfth century.

== Biography ==
Alberto Sotio is considered the central figure of the twelfth century Spoleto school of painting. The master's signature (with handwriting Sotio), was found on the crucifix of the Cathedral of Spoleto in the lower part of the figure of the skull of Adam under the image of Christ with the date 1187, and even further down and precisely on the end of the cross read a fragment of the text A. D. MCLXXXVII. M.... Opus. Alberto. Sotii .... A precious work and in perfect conservation. Also attributed to him are some of the frescoes in the former church of Santi Giovanni e Paolo, Spoleto. A fragment from a crucifix attributed to him is a rare example of an early Italian painting, executed on parchment affixed to a wooden panel. This suggests that he may have also worked as a manuscript illuminator. He is also credited with the fragment of the Madonna in Maestà, now preserved in the Pinacoteca di Brera.
