= Theodore Apsevdis =

13th-century Greek painter

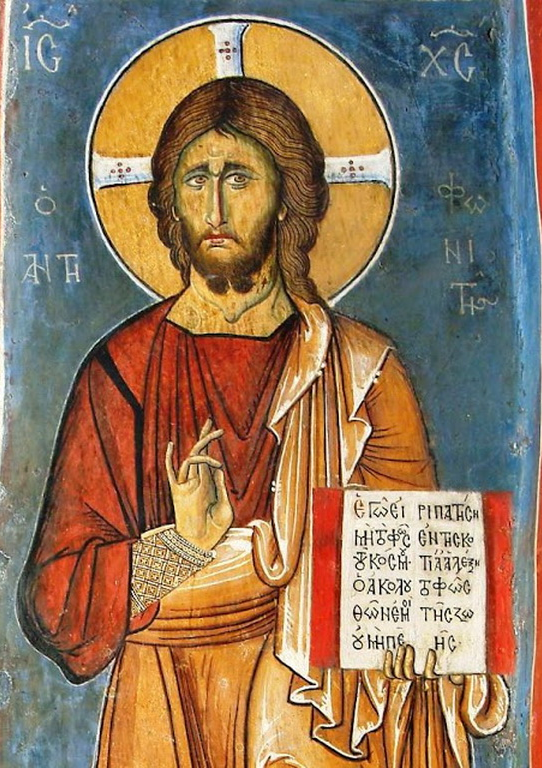
- Jesus Pantocrator
- Born: Assumed Constantinople (modern-day Istanbul, Turkey)
- Died: Possibly Cyprus
- Movement: Byzantine school

Theodore Apsevdis (Greek: Θεόδωρος Αψευδής) was a Greek painter assumed to be from Constantinople. He is one of the few Byzantine painters known by name. His contemporary in Italy was Alberto Sotio; both painters were active during the same period. They were active during the Komnenian restoration. Apsevdis's work influenced the Palaeologan Renaissance. Several Italian artists who painted in the style were Coppo di Marcovaldo and Guido of Siena. Apsevdis and his contemporaries set the stage for the Italian and Cretan Renaissance. Some of his notable work is in Cyprus.

== History ==
He may have been born in Constantinople sometime during the 12th century. Not much is known about his life. His painting style resembles the art of Constantinople. Historians have deduced he was from the city. He may have traveled all over the empire painting in different churches. His signature was found in one of the churches he painted in Cyprus. He is one of the few artists of the period whose name is known. Italian painter Alberto Sotio was the other known artist of the Italio-Byzantium during the same period. Many of Apsevdis's paintings survive until today. They are over 852 years old and are primarily in Cyprus. His main work is at the monastery of Saint Neophytos, Cyprus. The 1192 murals of Panagia tou Araka have also been ascribed to him. The 2022 book Mother of the Lamb gives an extensive treatment of this artist and defends the claim that his name can be attached to two monuments.

== Gallery ==
Known to be by Apsevdis:

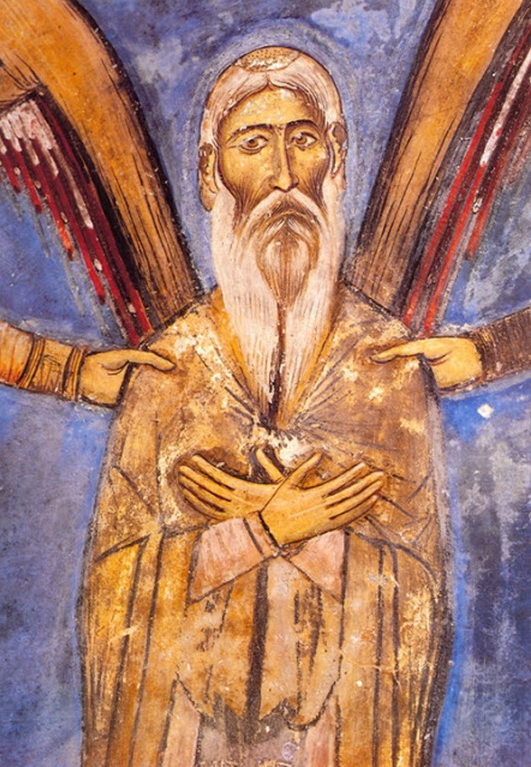
Fresco of a Saint

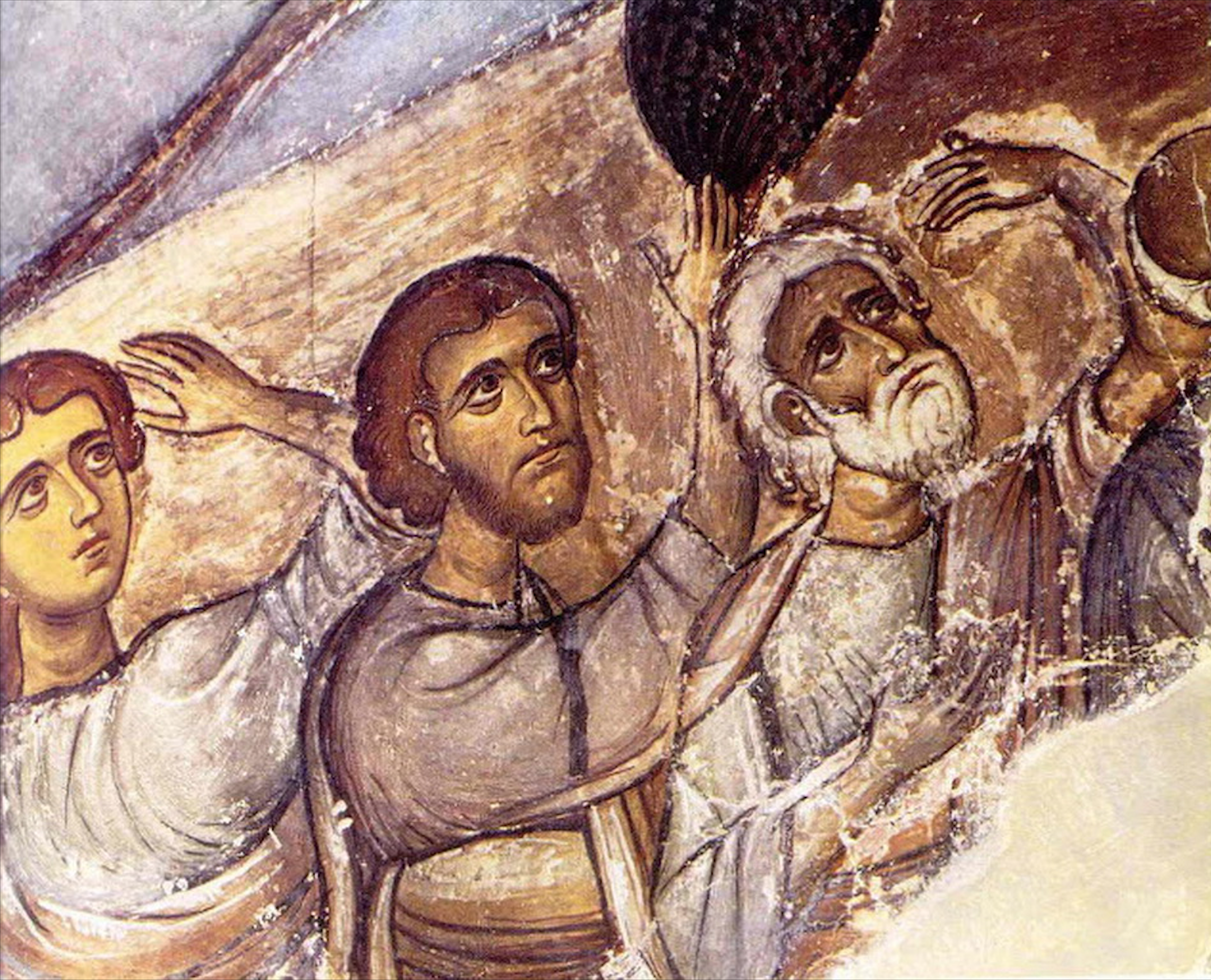
Fresco of Three Men

Ascribed to Apsevdis:

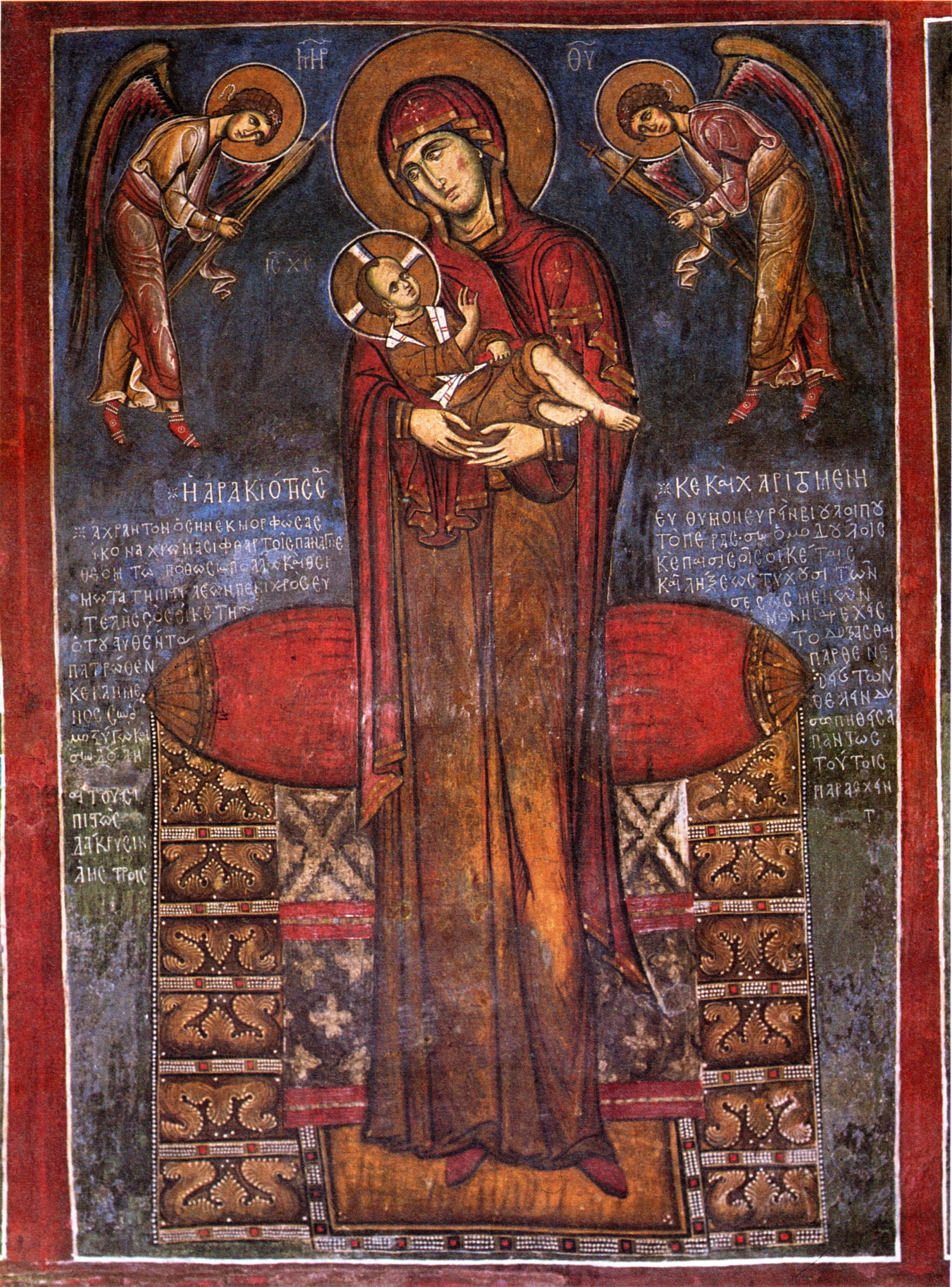
Virgin and Child

== See also ==
- Manuel Panselinos
- Ioannis Kornaros
