= Vlahakis =

Vlahakis or Vlahaki (Greek: Βλαχάκης, Βλαχάκη) is a Greek surname that may refer to

- Panayiota Vlahaki (born 1991), Greek long-distance runner
- Peter Vlahakis (born 1982), American lacrosse player
- Van Vlahakis (1935–2014), American entrepreneur of Greek origin
