= Chania =

City in western Crete, Greece

Chania/Hania Χανιά
- Municipality
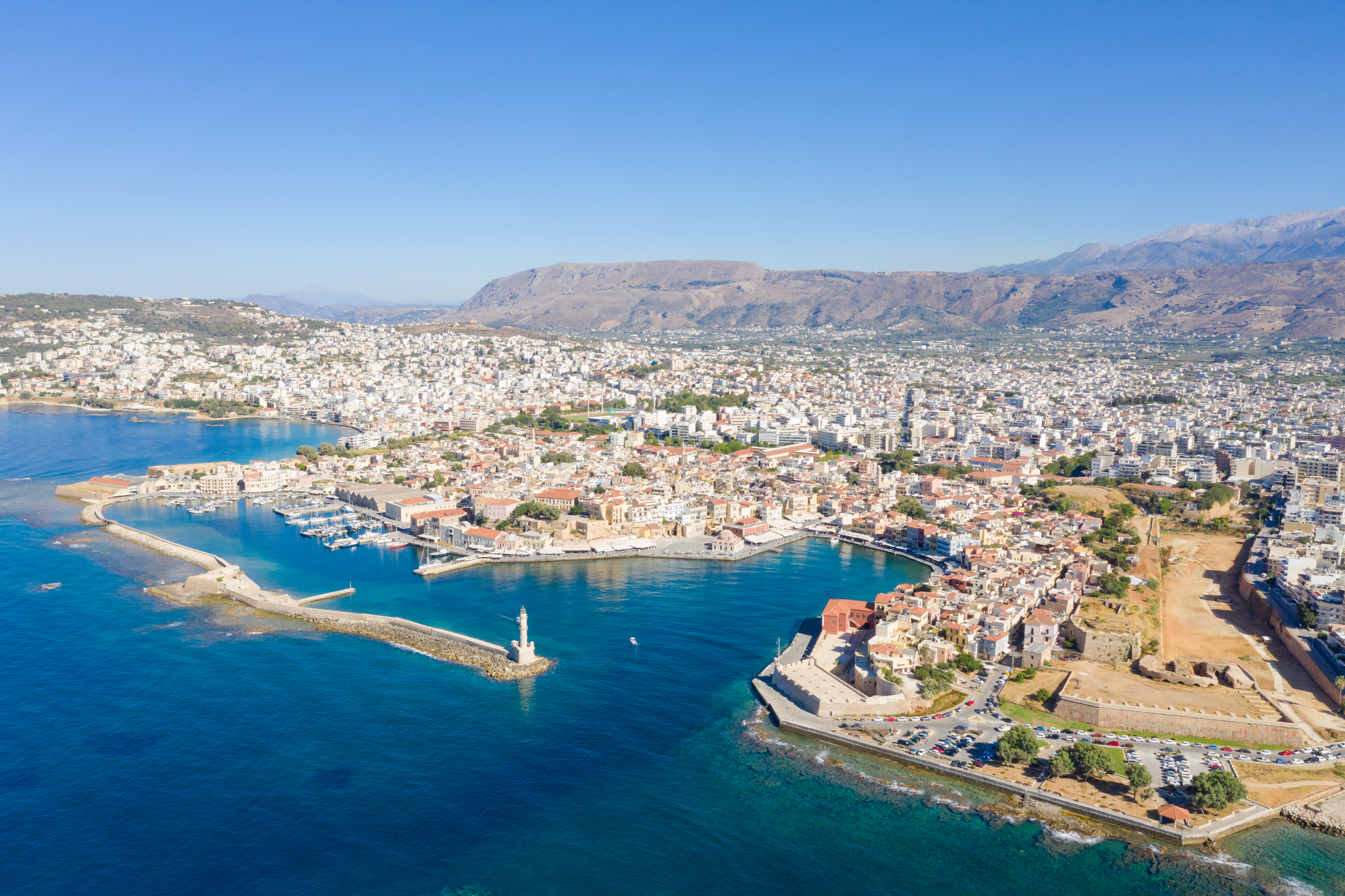
- View of the "Venetian port" of Chania.

- Seal

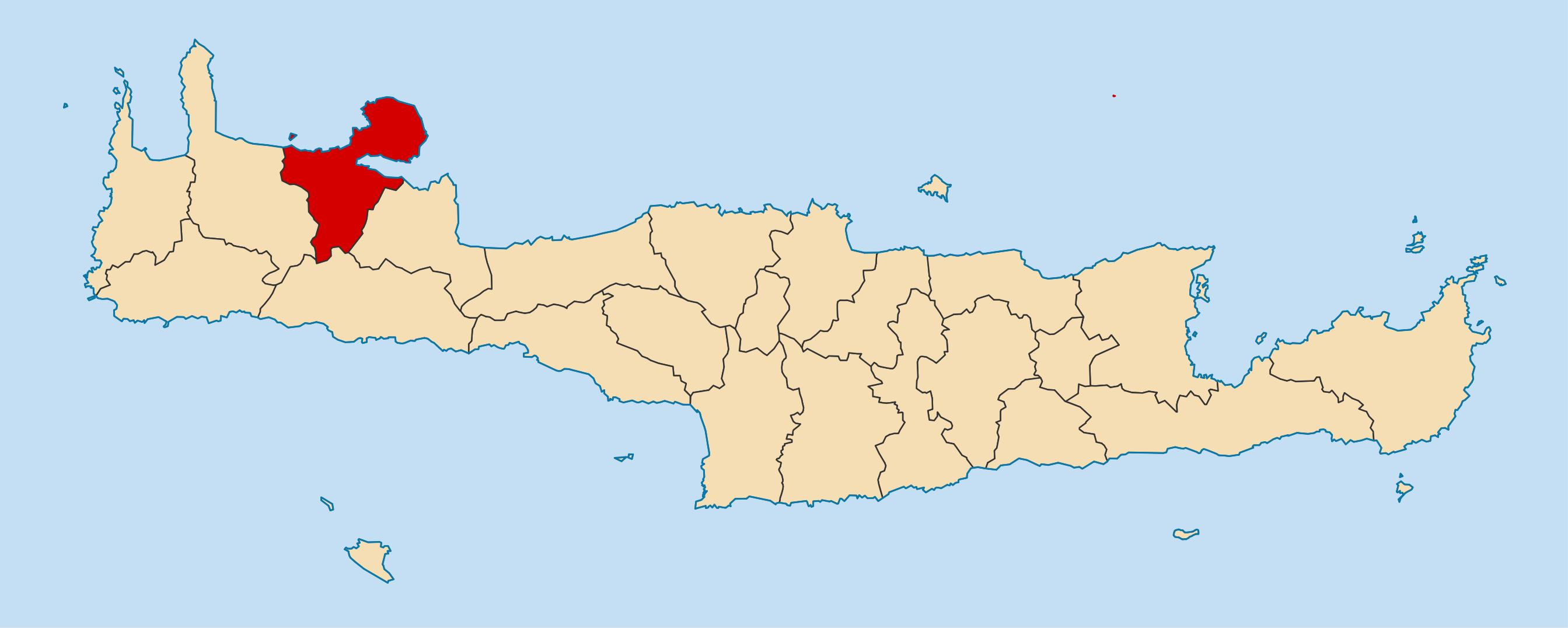

- Location within Greece
- Coordinates: 35°31′N 24°1′E
- Country: Greece
- Administrative region: Crete
- Regional unit: Chania

Government
  - Mayor: Panagiotis Simandirakis (since 2019)

Area
  - Municipality: 351.3 km^{2} (135.6 sq mi)
- Elevation: 20 m (66 ft)

Population (2021)
  - Municipality: 111,375
  - Density: 317.0/km^{2} (821.1/sq mi)
  - Municipal unit: 54,559
- Demonym(s): Chaniotis/Haniotis, Chaniotisa/Haniotisa
- Time zone: UTC+2 (EET)
  - Summer (DST): UTC+3 (EEST)
- Postal code: 73100
- Area code: 28210
- Vehicle registration: ΧΝ/XB/TY
- Website: www.chania.gr

Chania (Greek: Χανιά, Khaniá, pronounced [xaˈɲa]), also sometimes romanized as Hania, is a city in Greece and the capital of the Chania regional unit. It lies along the north west coast of the island Crete, about 70 km (43 mi) west of Rethymno and 145 km (90 mi) west of Heraklion.

The municipality has 111,375 inhabitants (2021). This consists of the city of Chania and several nearby areas, including Kounoupidiana, Mournies, Souda, Nerokouros, Daratsos, Perivolia, Galatas and Aroni.

== History ==
=== Minoan era ===
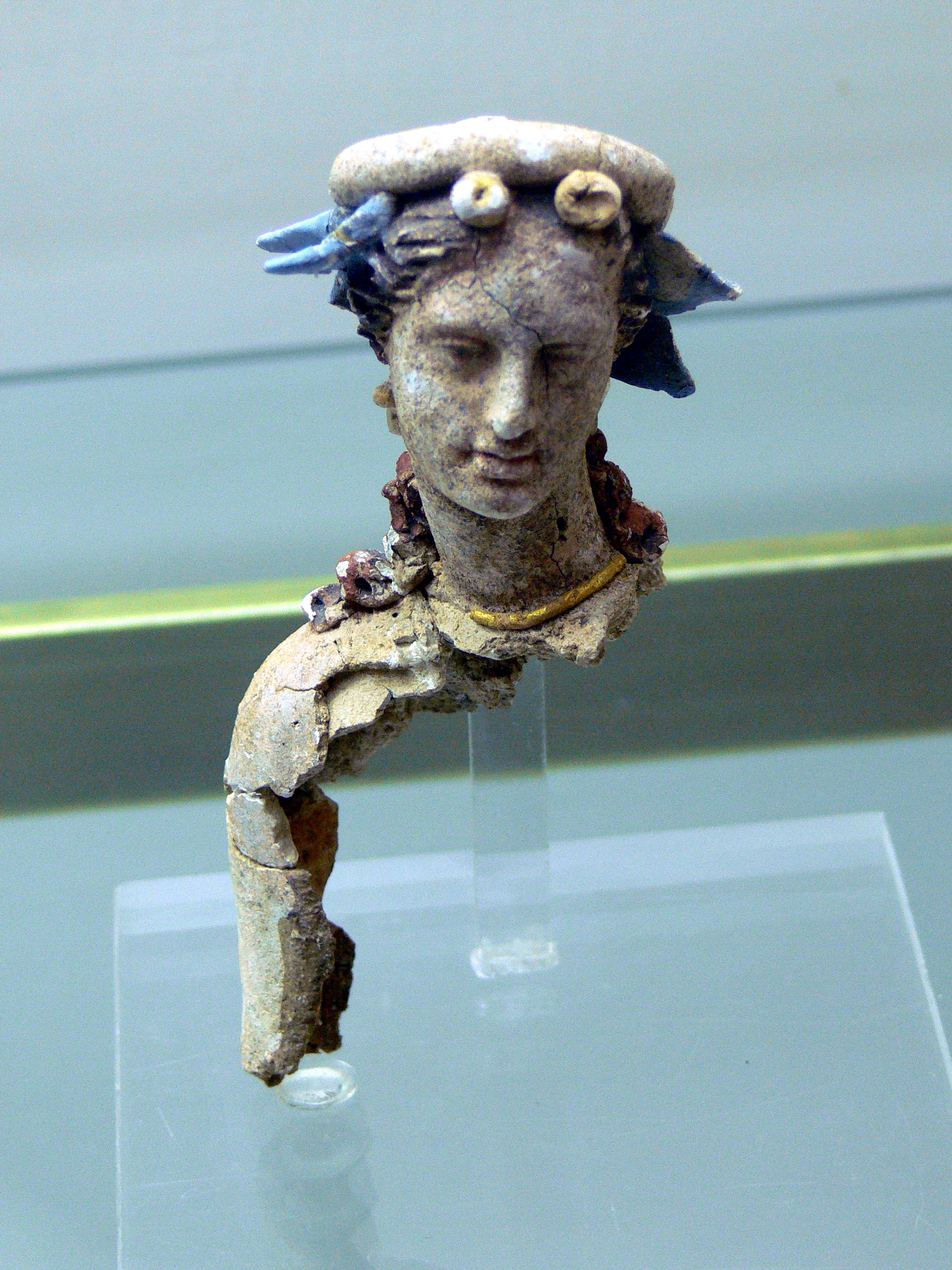
Hellenistic head of a woman from the cemetery of ancient Cydonia in the Archaeological Museum of Chania.

Chania was the site of a Minoan settlement, known from Linear B tablets from Knossos as having been named Ku-do-ni-ja (Mycenaean Greek: 𐀓𐀈𐀛𐀊). The subsequent Greek settlement was likewise known as Cydonia (Ancient Greek: Κυδωνία, Kydōnía), ultimately the source of the English word "quince".

Some notable archaeological evidence for the existence of this Minoan city below some parts of today's Chania was found by excavations in the district of Kasteli in the Old Town. This area appears to have been inhabited since the Neolithic Age.

=== Ancient Greek and Roman eras ===
Cydonia reemerged after the end of the Minoan period as an important city-state in Classical Greece, one whose domain extended from Chania Bay to the feet of the White Mountains. The first major wave of settlers from mainland Greece was by the Dorians who came around 1100 BC. Cydonia was constantly at war with other Cretan city-states such as Aptera, Phalasarna, and Polyrrinia and was important enough for the Cydonians to be mentioned in Homer's Odyssey. In 69 BC, the Roman consul Q. Caecilius Metellus defeated the Cretans and conquered Cydonia, to which he granted the privileges of an independent city-state.

=== Byzantine and Arab eras ===
Cydonia was not well documented in late antiquity or in the early medieval period, when it was first ruled by the Byzantine Empire (395–824) and then by the Emirate of Crete (824–961). The Arabs seem to have begun calling the settlement al-Ḵān (Arabic: الخان), literally "the Caravanserai" or "Inn" but possibly transcribing the name of a neighborhood previously devoted to the worship of the Minoan god Welchanos. The city had become known as Chania in Greek by the time of the second period of Byzantine rule (961–1204). In order to deter another Arab invasion, the Byzantines strongly fortified the city, reusing materials from ancient buildings in the area. Chania was the seat of a Byzantine bishopric, which became the Roman Catholic Diocese of La Canea under Venetian rule and then the Latin titular see of Cydonia.

=== Venetian era ===
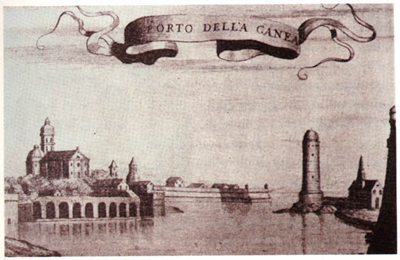
The old harbour during the Venetian era.

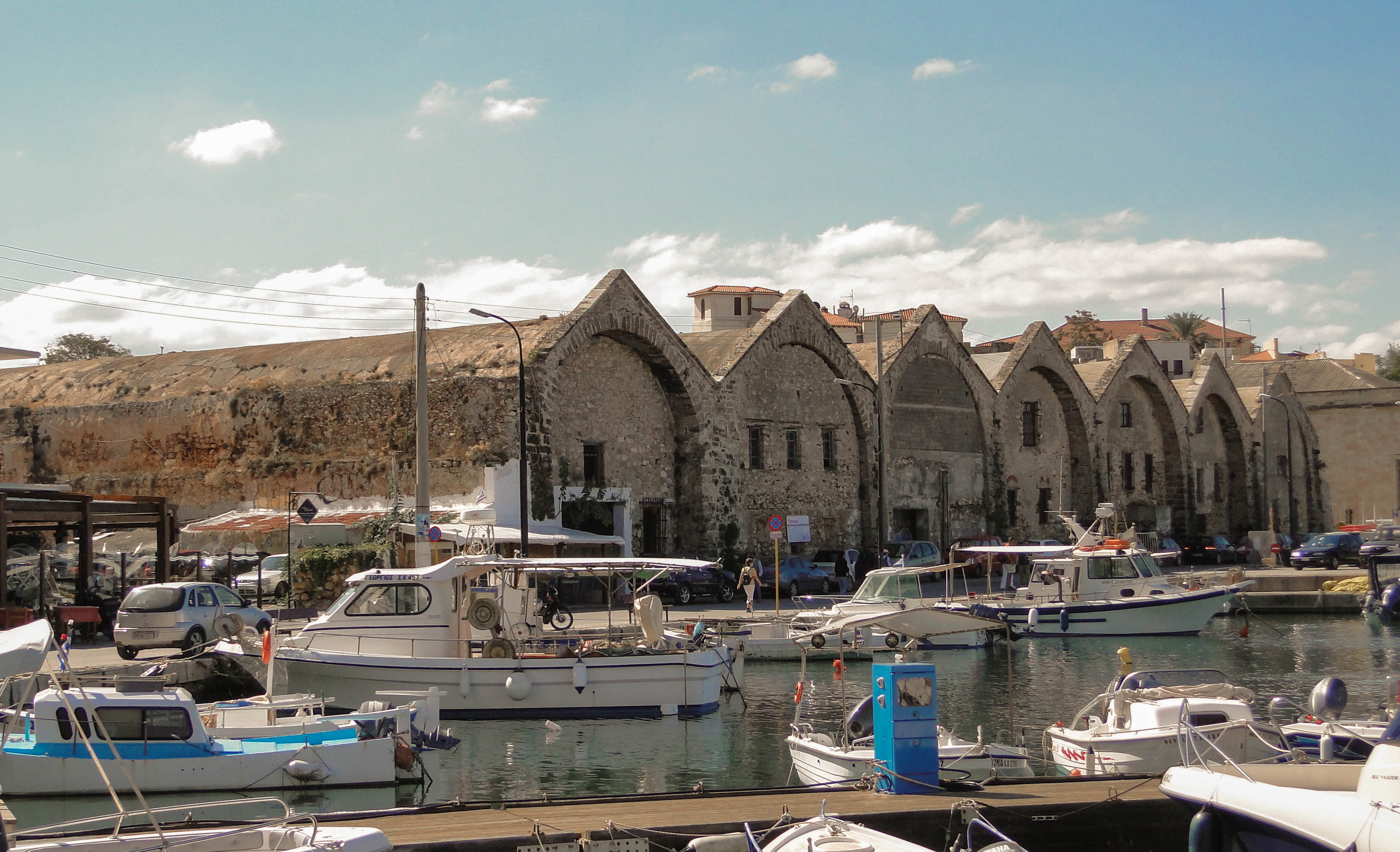
Venetian shipyards.

After the fall of Constantinople during the 1204 Fourth Crusade, Crete was distributed to Bonifacio, Marquess of Montferrat. He in turn chose to sell it to the Venetians for 1000 silver marks.

In total, about 10,000 Venetians are estimated to have moved to Crete during the first century of Venetian rule—by comparison, Venice itself had a population of c. 60,000 at this period. The colonization wave of 1252 also resulted in the establishment of Canea (modern Chania), on the site of the long abandoned ancient city of Kydonia.

The Venetian rule was initially strict and oppressive but slowly the relations between the two parts improved. Contact with Venice led to close intertwining of Cretan and Venetian cultures, without, however, the Cretans losing their Greek Orthodox nature. Its fortifications were strengthened, giving Chania the form that it still has today. On the other hand, after the fall of Constantinople in 1453, many priests, monks and artists took refuge in Crete and reinforced the Byzantine religion and culture on the island. The city of Canea during the period that followed was a blend of Byzantine, Venetian, and Classical Greek cultural elements. Many of the important buildings of the town were built during this era and the intellectual activities (written word, music, education) were also promoted.

=== Ottoman era ===
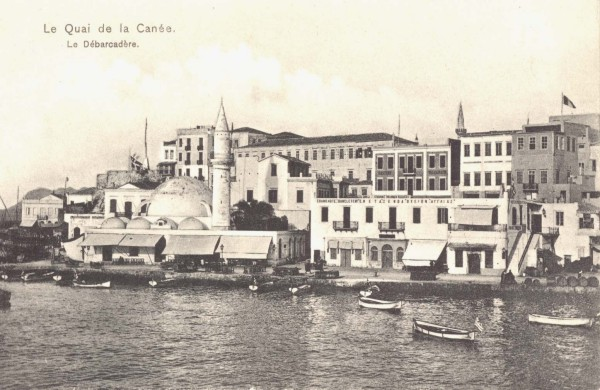
The old harbour during the Ottoman era.

During the opening months of the Cretan War (1645–1669) the city's walls did not prevent an Ottoman army from capturing it from the Venetians after a two-month siege. Many Cretans fled to escape persecution, many others were slaughtered or converted to Islam.

Under the Ottoman Turkish name Hanya (خانیه), Muslims resided mainly in the eastern quarters, Kastelli and Splantzia, where they converted the Dominican Church of St. Nicholas into the central Sovereign's Mosque (Turkish: Hünkar Camısı). They also built new mosques such as the Küçük Hasan Pasha Mosque or Yali Mosque on the harbour. Public baths (hamam), and fountains were a feature of the Ottoman city. The pasha of Crete resided in Hanya.

The city remained under Ottoman control despite fighting during the Greek War of Independence (1821-29), the Cretan Revolt (1866–1869) and the Cretan Revolt (1878). Due to the island's mixture of Muslim and Christian residents, Crete was the subject of international debate between the European great powers, most notably at the Treaty of Berlin (1878) which resulted in the Pact of Halepa. During the 19th and early 20th century, interethnic violence on Crete eventually led to the mass migration of the island's local Muslim population to other Mediterranean islands or coastal cities. Mass conversions also occurred. The population exchange between Greece and Turkey in 1922 resulted in the deportation of the island's last Muslim residents.

=== Modern era ===
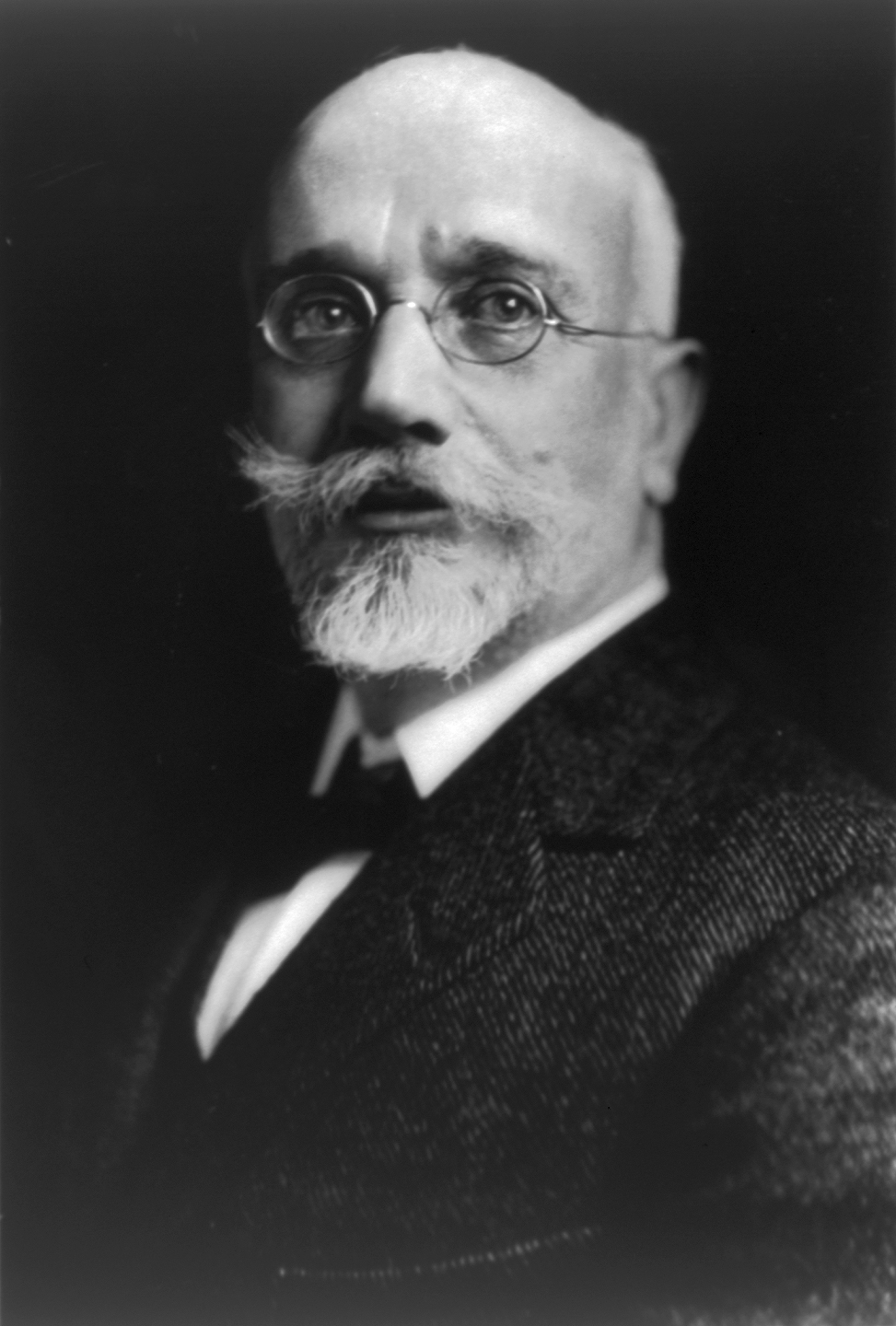
Eleftherios Venizelos (1864–1936), major political figure of the 20th century European scene, was born in Chania.

In 1898, during the final moves towards independence and enosis—union with Greece—the Great Powers made Chania the capital of the semi-autonomous Cretan State (Kritiki Politeia), with Prince George of Greece, the High Commissioner of Crete living here. During these years Crete issued its own stamps and money. This was a very important transitional period when, no longer an isolated vilayet of the Ottoman Empire, the city became more cosmopolitan and flourishing, regaining its role as the crossroad of civilizations, influenced by Europe as well as by the East. Many important buildings were built during this era, intellectual and artistic societies were created and a new class of local aristocracy brought a different atmosphere to the everyday life of the town. The district of Halepa has many fine neoclassical embassies and consulates dating from this period.

However the main goal was enosis with Greece, which came after Eleftherios Venizelos's constant opposition to Prince George's rule over Crete. The series of conflicts includes the Therisos revolt in 1905, which overthrew Prince George and brought Alexandros Zaimis to rule Crete. Finally, in 1908, Venizelos managed to establish a revolutionary government, recognized by the Great Powers. His later election as the prime minister of Greece (1910) eventually led to Crete's union with Greece on 1 December 1913, following the Balkan Wars. The Greek flag was raised for the first time at Fort Firka in the Old Harbour in the presence of Venizelos and King Constantine.

Due to the popularity of Venizelos, Chania as with most of Crete remained staunchly pro-Venizelist, pro-Liberal and later pro-Republican in the National Schism and the interwar period. The only attempt to overthrow the monarchist Metaxas Regime occurred in the city with the failed 28 July 1938 uprising.

=== World War II ===
Another important period for the city of Chania was the invasion and occupation by German forces during World War II. The British force that faced the German paratroopers during the Battle of Crete in 1941, had artillery elements over the hill of Dexameni in the south of the city. These elements bombarded the German forces in the Maleme airfield undetected, until they ran out of ammunition. George II of Greece stayed in a villa near the village of Perivolia outside Chania before escaping to Egypt. Part of the city was bombed and a significant proportion of the area's population was either executed or imprisoned due to participation in the resistance against the German rule. The Jewish community of Chania was also eliminated during the German occupation. Most of them were transported off the island by the Nazi occupiers in 1944. A British torpedo sank the ship Tanais, which was carrying most of the Jewish prisoners.

=== Postwar era ===
The city of Chania slowly regained its normal pace of development during the 1950s, trying to overcome the difficulties that the war had left in its aftermath. During the 1970s, Crete became a major tourist destination for Greek and international tourists, something that gave a significant boost to the city's economy and affected the everyday life and the overall culture of the locals. The capital of Crete was moved to Heraklion in 1971.

Since the 1990s, the city of Chania has entered a new era, mainly due to construction and infrastructure such as a new airport, port and educational facilities, and it is considered a prominent tourist resort in the Mediterranean Sea.

== Geography ==
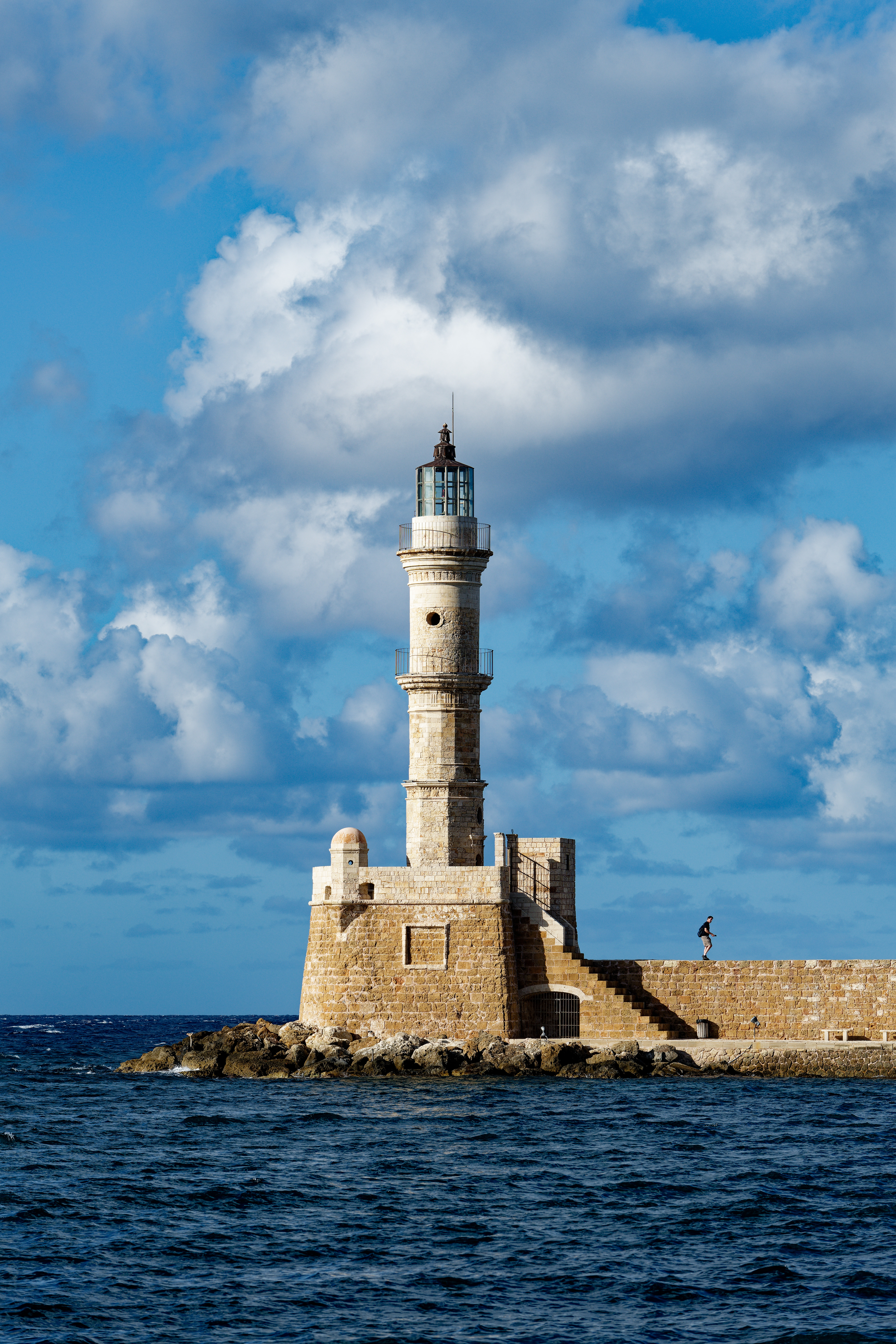
Chania lighthouse at the port

The city of Chania lies around 40 km (25 mi) from the west end of Crete. By road, the distance is approximately 52 km (32 mi).

=== Cityscape ===
The city of Chania can be divided into two parts: the old town and the modern city which is the larger one. The old town is situated next to the old harbour and is the matrix around which the whole urban area was developed. It used to be surrounded by the old Venetian fortifications that started to be built in 1538. Of them, only the eastern and western parts have survived. From the south, the old town is continuous with the new, and from the north the physical border is the sea. The centre of the modern city is the area extending next to the old town and especially towards the south.

==== The old town ====
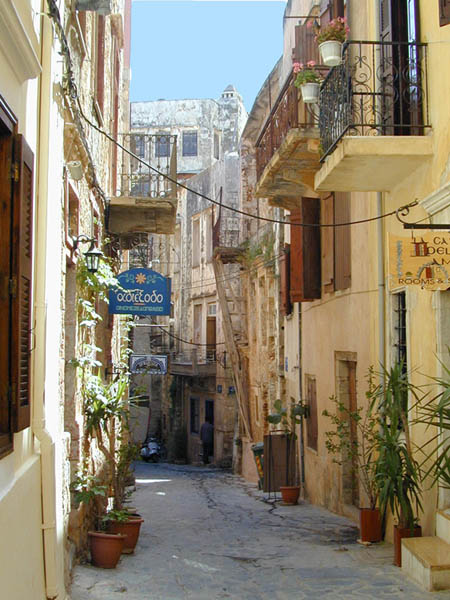
Traditional street in the old town.

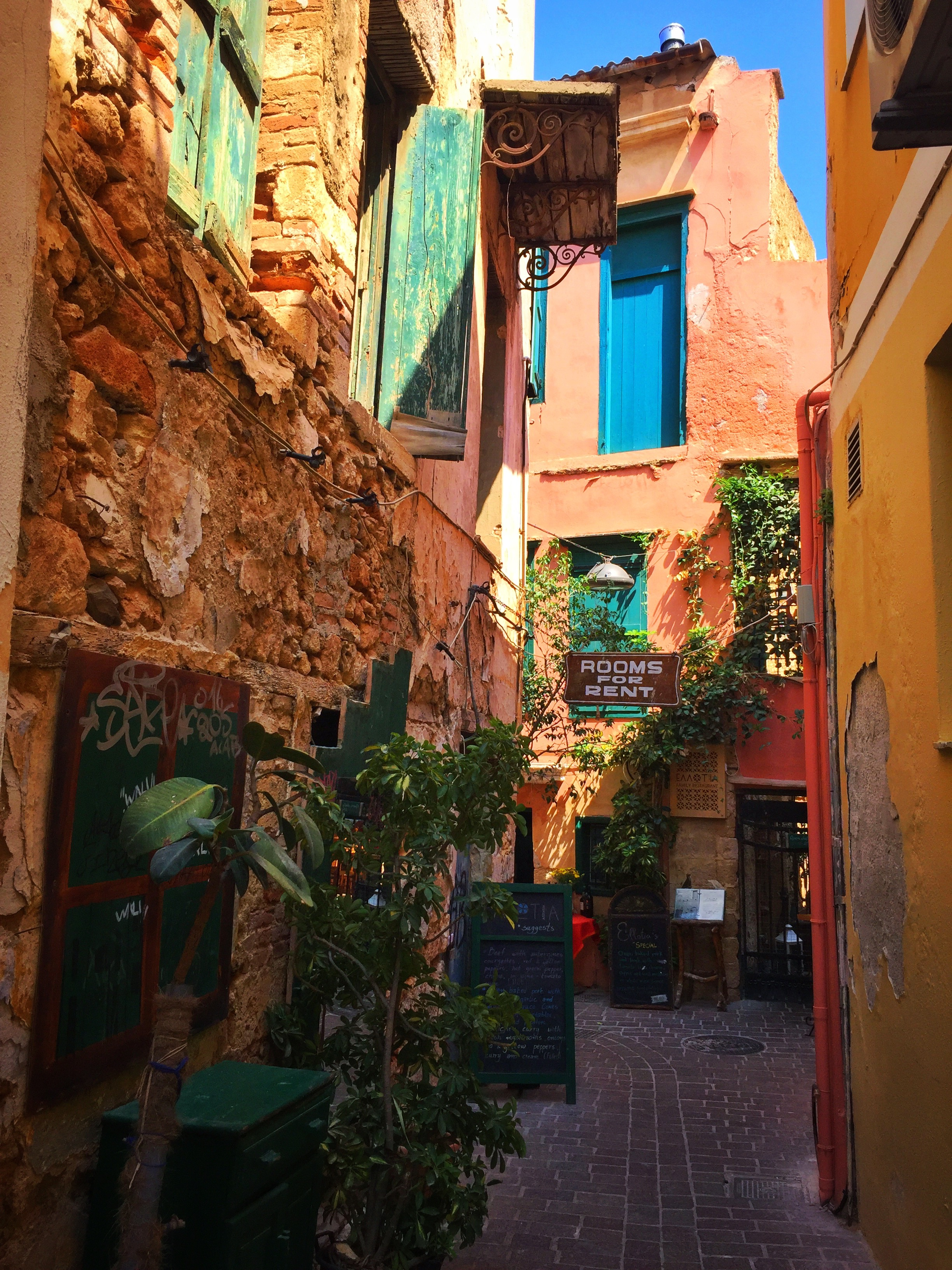
Colors of the old town

The borders of the Old Town are the partly destroyed old Venetian wall (and bulwarks) and this has been the cradle of all the civilizations which were developed in the area. The central part of the old town is named Kasteli and has been inhabited since Neolithic times (ancient Kydonia). It is located on a small hill right next to the seafront and has always been the ideal place for a settlement due to its secure position, its location next to the harbour and its proximity to the fertile valley in the south. Nowadays it is a bit more quiet than the neighbouring areas of the west part of the district. The Splantzia quarter (next to the east part of Kasteli) is also largely untouched.

The main square of the Old Town (next to the west end of Kasteli) is Eleftherios Venizelos Square, also known as Syntrivani (from Turkish şadırvan 'fountain'). It is the heart of the tourist activities in the area. Next to this (on the west side) lies the Topanas district, which was the Christian quarter during the Ottoman period. Its name comes from the Venetian ammunition warehouse (Turkish tophane), which was located there. The Jewish quarter (Evraiki or Ovraiki) was located at the north-west of the Old Town, behind the harbour and within the borders of Topanas. The Topanas area has many narrow alleys and old buildings, some of which have been restored as hotels, restaurants, shops and bars. This makes it a popular place especially during the warm period (April–October). In the winter, it still remains a centre of activities (especially for nightlife).

Finally, a very distinctive area of the Old Town is the harbour itself and generally the seafront. Akti Tompazi, Akti Kountouriotou and Akti Enoseos (marina) all feature several historical buildings and nightlife. The main street that combines the modern town with the old town is Halidon Street.

==== The modern city ====
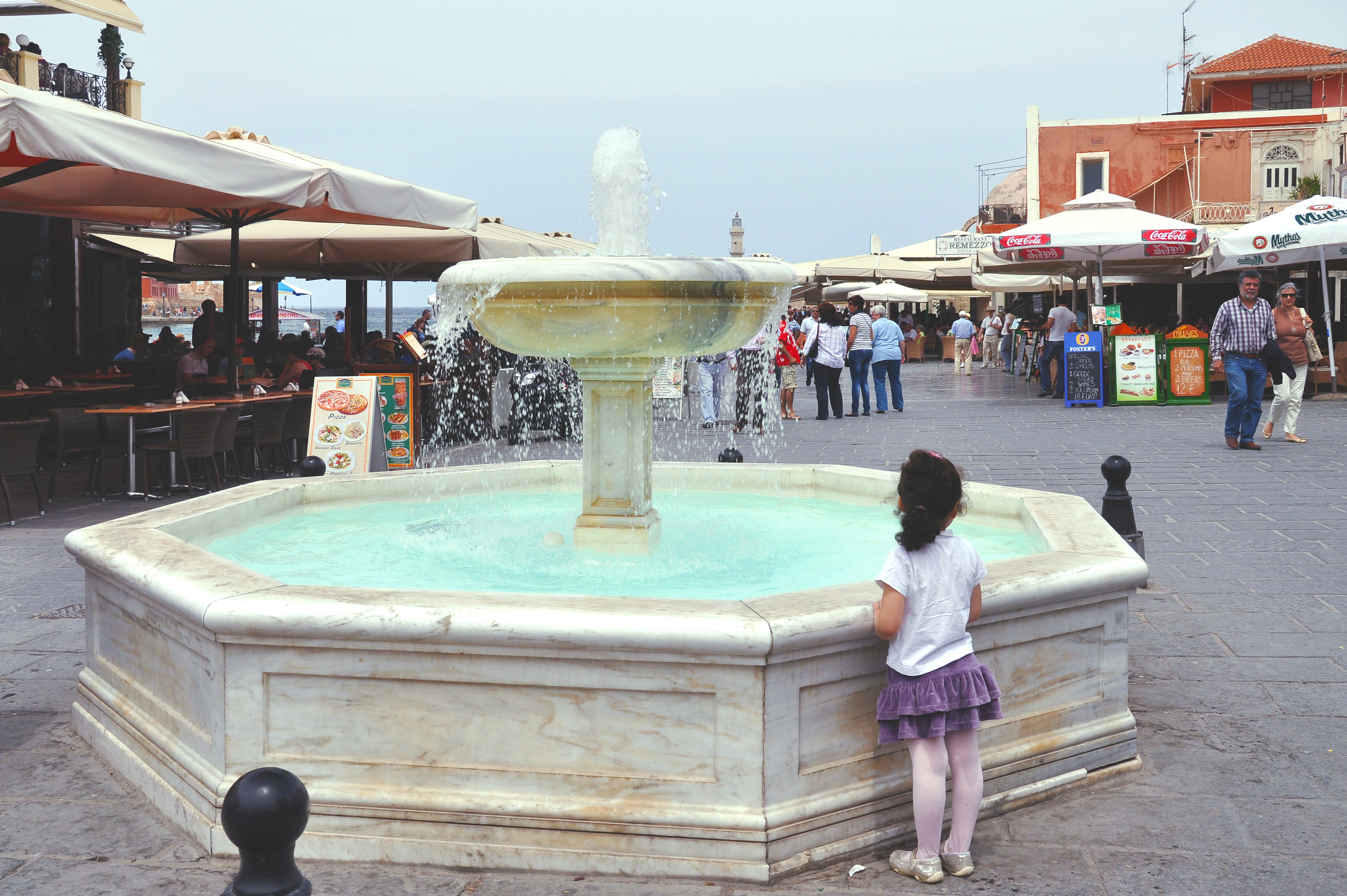
The fountain in Eleftherios Venizelos Square

The modern part of Chania is where most locals live and work. It is less traditional than the old town, but there are still areas of some historical interest.

The oldest district (early 18th century) of the modern city is Nea Hora (meaning "New Town") which is located beyond the west end of the old town. It is a developing area with narrow old lanes leading to a small fishing harbour.

The district of Koum Kapi (the Venetians had first named it "Sabbionara", which means "the Gate of the Sand", the same as "Koum Kapi") situated beyond the walls at the eastern part of the old town, was also one of the first places to be inhabited outside the fortification walls. Initially, it was home for the "Halikoutes", a group of Bedouins from North Africa who had settled there in the last years of Ottoman rule. Nowadays it is a developing area with many cafes, bars and restaurants on its beach.

In the same era the district of Halepa began to grow to the east of the city and used to be home for the local aristocracy. Some of the historical buildings of the area (including old embassies of foreign countries) had been destroyed or abandoned during the later decades of the 20th century, and it was only recently when some interest was shown for the restoration of the remaining ones.

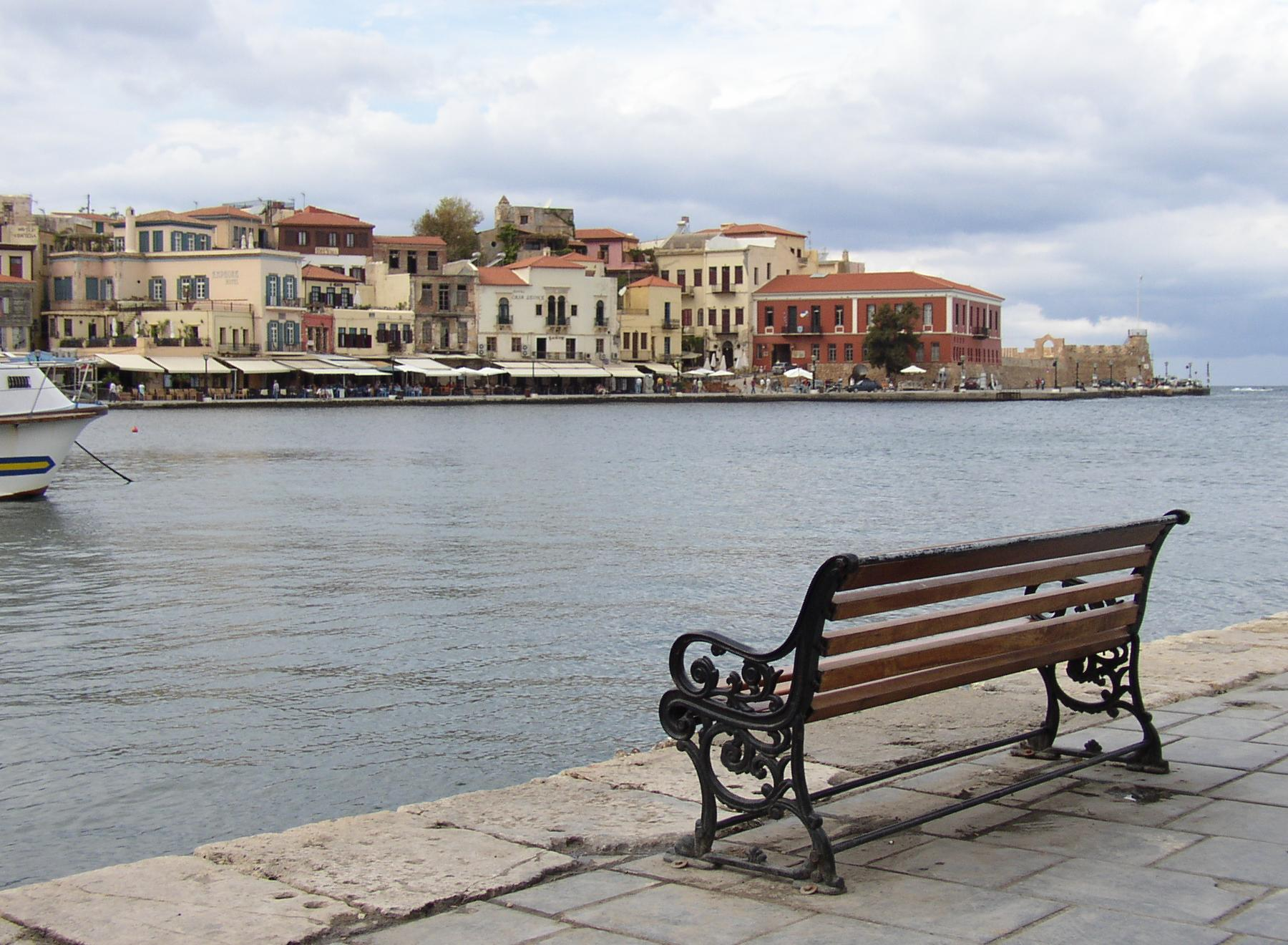
View of the promenade.

Other historical buildings in the area include Eleftherios Venizelos's House (built 1876-1880), the old French school (now property of the Technical University of Crete, housing the Department of Architecture), the Church of Agia Magdalini (built 1901-1903), The "Palace" (built 1882, house of Prince George during the period of the Cretan independence) and The Church of Evangelistria (built 1908–1923). Part of the marine area of Halepa is called Tabakaria, where a unique architectural complex of old leather processing houses is situated.

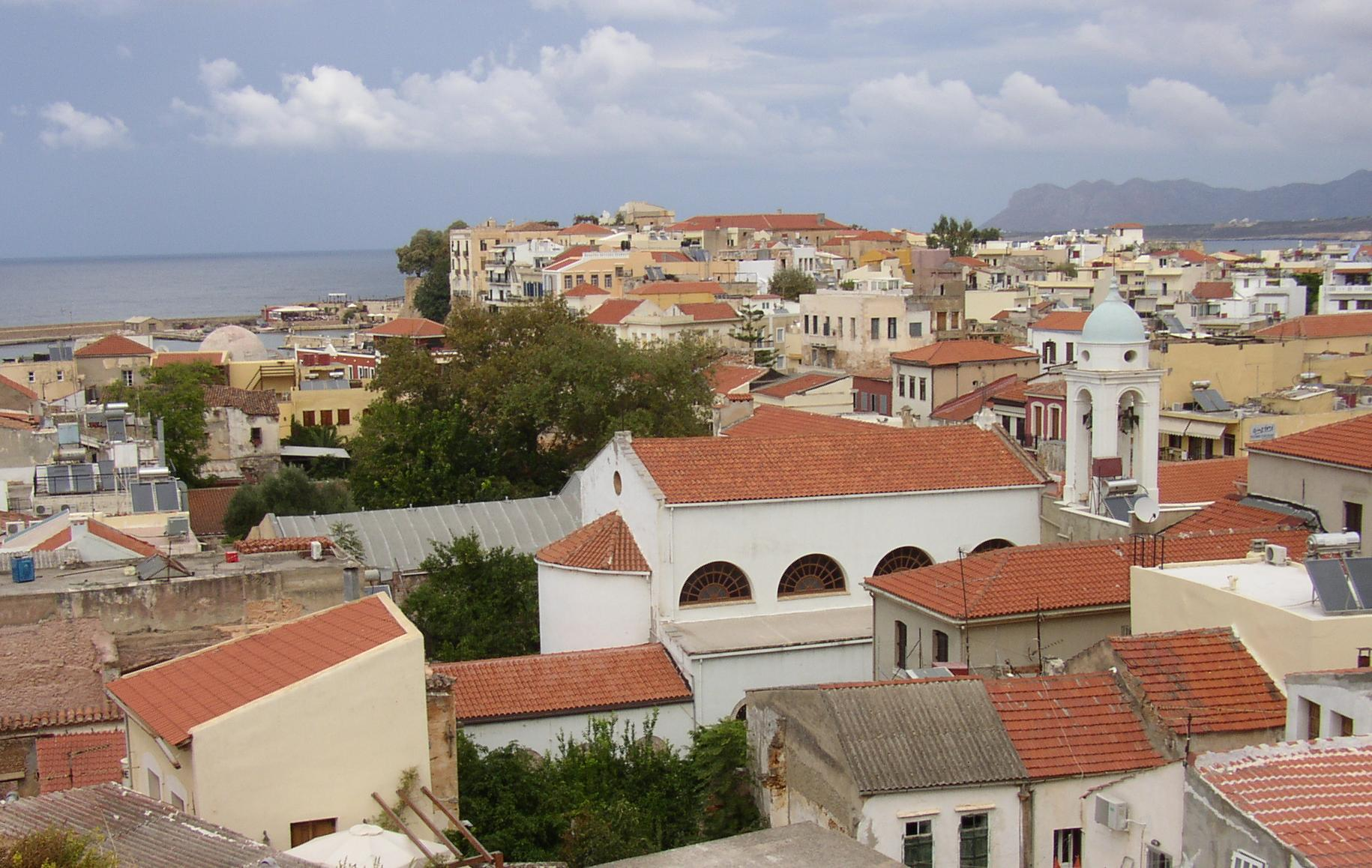
Castelli district.

Apart from the previously mentioned older districts of the modern part of the town, several new residential areas have been developed during the 20th century, like Agios Ioannis, Koumbes, Lentariana, Pachiana and Pasakaki. Sections of the city centre are dominated by colourless medium-height block buildings, typical of the urbanization period of Greece (1950–1970). However, there are still some neoclassical houses, especially in the eastern part of Chania. There are some parks and several sports grounds, the most important being the Venizeleio Stadium of Chania and the Swimming Pool at Nea Hora. The 1913 indoor market ("Agora"), is on the edge of the old town and is popular with tourists and locals alike. Some other important sites of the newer urban area are The Court House ("Dikastiria", built late in the 19th century), the Public Gardens ("Kipos", created in 1870), the Garden Clock-Tower ("Roloi", built in 1924–1927), the Episcopal Residence (Bishop's residence, "Despotiko", built in the early 19th century) and the House of Manousos Koundouros (built in 1909), the Cultural Centre ("Pnevmatiko Kentro"). The central largest squares in Chania are the Market Square ("Agora"), the Court House Square ("Dikastiria") and the "1866 Square".

Since the 1990s, there has been a profound movement of Chania residents towards the suburbs, as well as towards areas around the city which used to be rural, mainly around Kounoupidiana in the Akrotiri Peninsula.

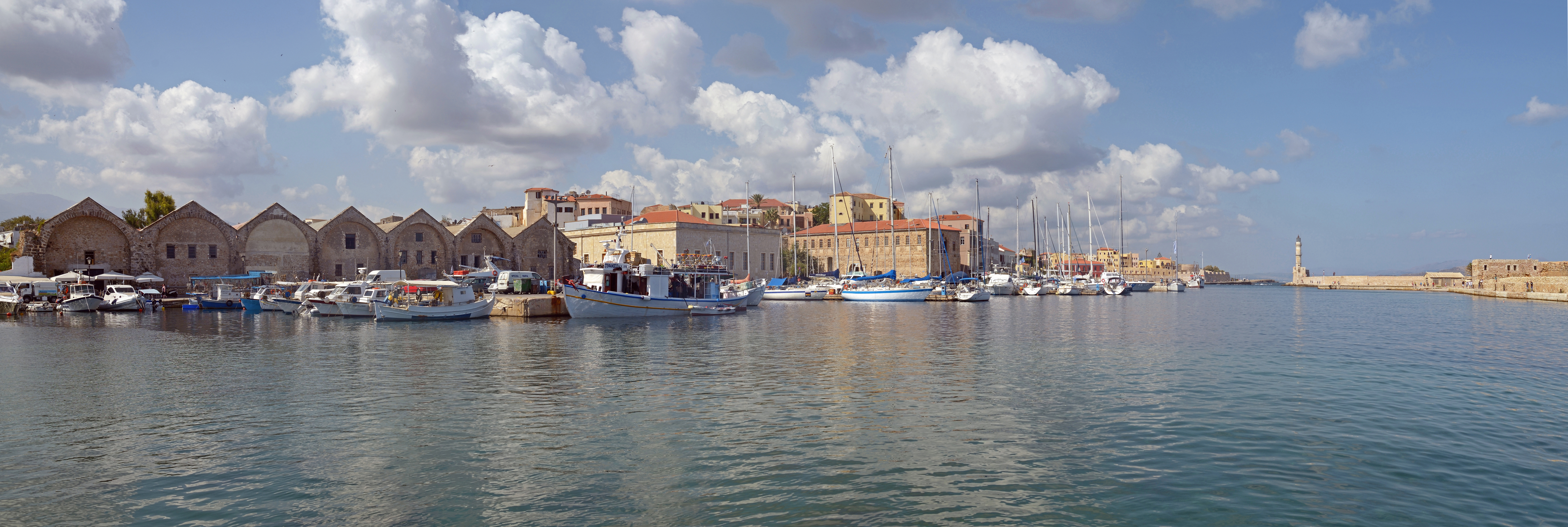
The marina in the old harbour.
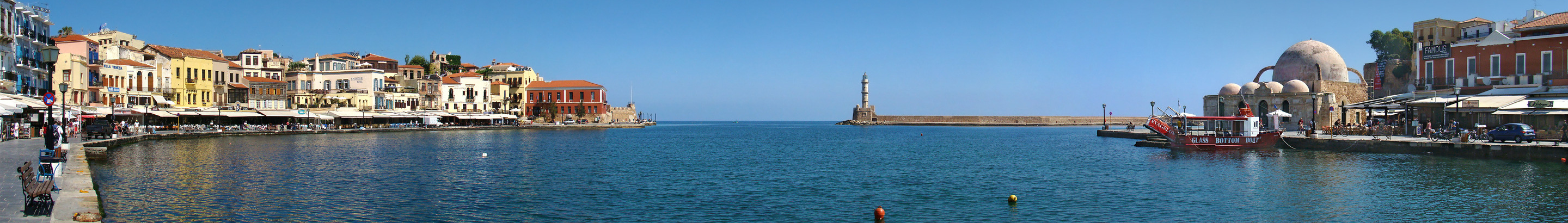
Panorama of the port.

=== Climate ===
Chania, Greece

Climate chart (precipitation, max. and min. temperature)
| J | F | M | A | M | J | J | A | S | O | N | D |
| 142 14 8 | 112 15 8 | 81 17 9 | 32 20 11 | 13 24 15 | 4.6 29 19 | 1.3 30 21 | 1.6 30 21 | 19 27 18 | 80 23 15 | 73 20 12 | 94 16 9 |
- █ Average max. and min. temperatures in °C
- █ Precipitation totals in mm
Imperial conversion
| J | F | M | A | M | J | J | A | S | O | N | D |
| 5.6 58 46 | 4.4 59 46 | 3.2 62 47 | 1.3 68 52 | 0.5 76 58 | 0.2 84 65 | 0.1 87 69 | 0.1 86 69 | 0.7 81 65 | 3.2 74 59 | 2.9 67 53 | 3.7 61 49 |
- █ Average max. and min. temperatures in °F
- █ Precipitation totals in inches

The city has a hot-summer Mediterranean climate (Köppen: Csa), with sunny dry summers and mild rainy winters. During the period between April and October, clear-sky weather is almost an everyday feature. The atmosphere is always warm, but strong heat waves (temperatures above 38 °C) are not very common, since the prevailing etesian winds ("Meltemia") blow from the Aegean Sea and pleasantly moderate the conditions. Intervals of sunny days are frequent during the windy and rainy winter as well. Snow and frost are rare near the coast, with very few exceptions, like the snowstorm on 13 February 2004, when 25–75 cm (9.8–29.5 in) of snow accumulated in the greater regional area, causing general chaos. The last significant snowfall occurred on 8 January 2017 when the whole city and the old harbor were covered by snow. However, such cold days can be followed by much warmer and sunny weather. Heat waves can occur from as early as March, oftentimes accompanied by Saharan dust, whose main feature are the hot katabatic winds (foehn winds) blowing from the south, also called Sirocco (Σιρόκος) or "Livas" (the wind from Libya) by the Greeks.

The adjacent climate chart is based on data recorded during 1958–1997. The absolute maximum temperature recorded during this period was 42.5 °C (109 °F), while the absolute minimum recorded was 0 °C (32 °F).

However, the record minimum was broken on 13 February 2004 when the temperature dropped to −1 °C (30 °F) in the nearby airport of Souda and the record maximum was broken on 1 July 2021 when the temperature reached 44.3 °C (111.7 °F) in the city station operated by the National Observatory of Athens.

The climate in Chania is further complemented due to the terrain and can vary throughout its regions and elevations and according to its topography. At the south lies the mountain range of Lefka Ori. Furthermore, prevailing winds, such as those of the West side and South of Crete, in addition to the North side—all interact to form its climate.

Climate data for Chania Airport (Souda) 1971–2000
| Month | Jan | Feb | Mar | Apr | May | Jun | Jul | Aug | Sep | Oct | Nov | Dec | Year |
|---|---|---|---|---|---|---|---|---|---|---|---|---|---|
| Mean daily maximum °C (°F) | 14.0 (57.2) | 14.3 (57.7) | 16.1 (61.0) | 19.9 (67.8) | 24.5 (76.1) | 29.0 (84.2) | 30.5 (86.9) | 30.0 (86.0) | 27.5 (81.5) | 23.4 (74.1) | 19.0 (66.2) | 15.6 (60.1) | 22.0 (71.6) |
| Daily mean °C (°F) | 10.8 (51.4) | 11.0 (51.8) | 12.4 (54.3) | 15.8 (60.4) | 20.1 (68.2) | 24.7 (76.5) | 26.6 (79.9) | 25.9 (78.6) | 23.2 (73.8) | 19.4 (66.9) | 15.3 (59.5) | 12.4 (54.3) | 18.1 (64.6) |
| Mean daily minimum °C (°F) | 8.1 (46.6) | 8.0 (46.4) | 8.9 (48.0) | 11.7 (53.1) | 15.2 (59.4) | 19.2 (66.6) | 21.4 (70.5) | 21.3 (70.3) | 19.1 (66.4) | 15.9 (60.6) | 12.4 (54.3) | 9.7 (49.5) | 14.2 (57.6) |
| Average rainfall mm (inches) | 126.4 (4.98) | 101.9 (4.01) | 81.2 (3.20) | 26.9 (1.06) | 11.2 (0.44) | 2.0 (0.08) | 1.4 (0.06) | 1.4 (0.06) | 15.2 (0.60) | 61.5 (2.42) | 86.7 (3.41) | 98.9 (3.89) | 614.7 (24.21) |
| Average rainy days (≥ 0.1 mm) | 17.0 | 14.7 | 12.0 | 7.8 | 3.9 | 1.4 | 0.2 | 0.6 | 2.6 | 9.8 | 10.8 | 15.8 | 96.6 |
| Average relative humidity (%) | 70.3 | 68.7 | 66.9 | 62.7 | 60.2 | 52.4 | 49.3 | 52.4 | 57.8 | 65.6 | 71.1 | 72.2 | 62.5 |
| Mean monthly sunshine hours | 118.1 | 135.6 | 188.0 | 240.9 | 303.0 | 355.4 | 376.7 | 355.7 | 281.9 | 208.7 | 138.0 | 111.7 | 2,813.7 |
Source 1: Climate Atlas-Hellenic National Meteorological Service.
Source 2: Humidity 1958-2010

== Government ==
Municipalities of Chania regional unit. Chania is number 1.

The municipality of Chania was formed in the 2011 local government reform by the merger of the following seven former municipalities, that became municipal units:

- Akrotiri
- Chania
- Eleftherios Venizelos
- Keramia
- Nea Kydonia
- Souda
- Theriso

The municipality has an area of 351.306 km^{2} (135.640 sq mi), the municipal unit 12.564 km^{2} (4.851 sq mi). The municipality forms the eastern shore of Chania Bay (Kolpos Chanion Κόλπος Χανίων) and is bordered by Platanias (6) to the west, Sfakia (7) to the south and Apokoronas (2) to the east.

== Culture ==
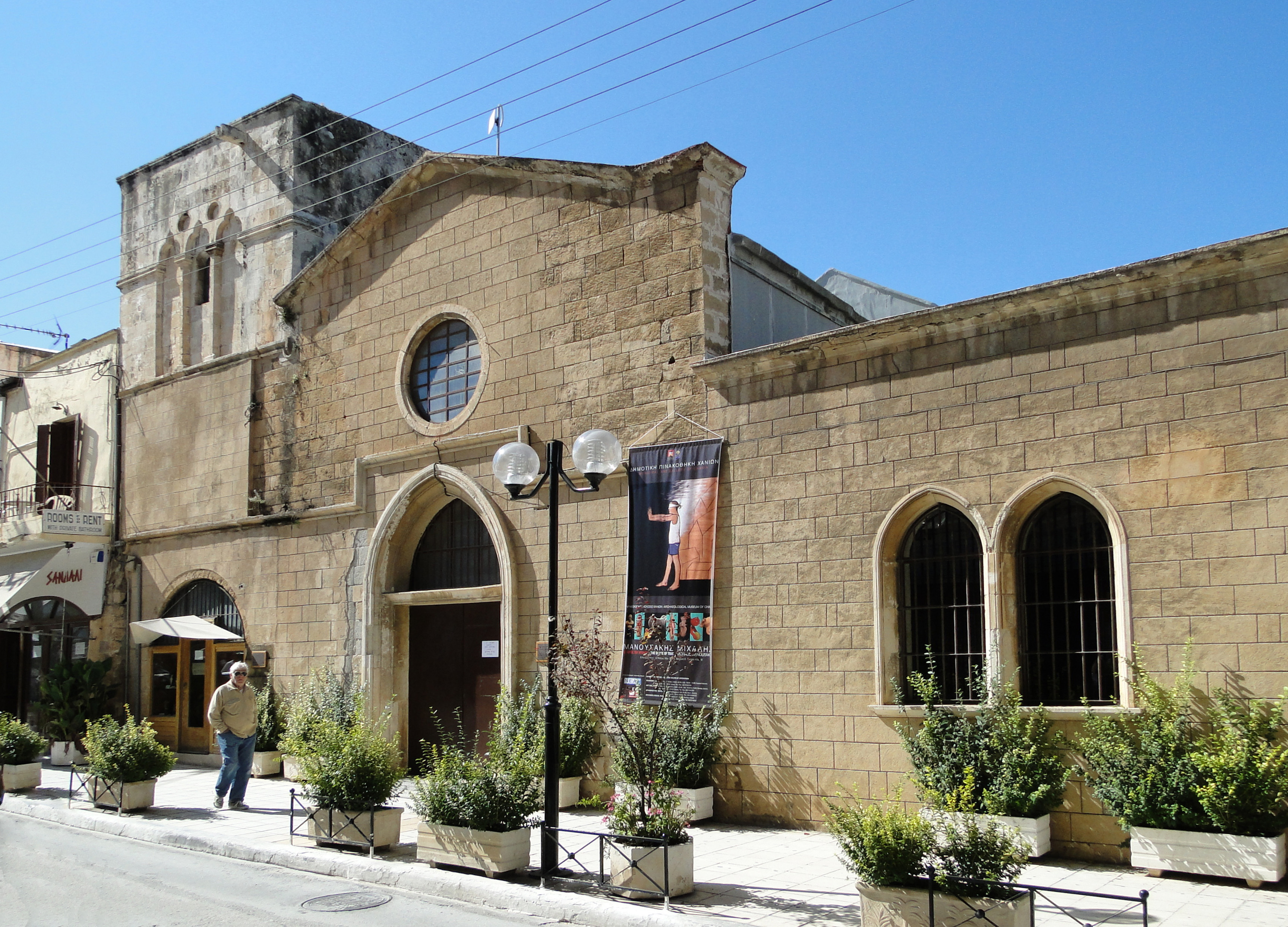
The previous site of the Archaeological Museum of Chania.

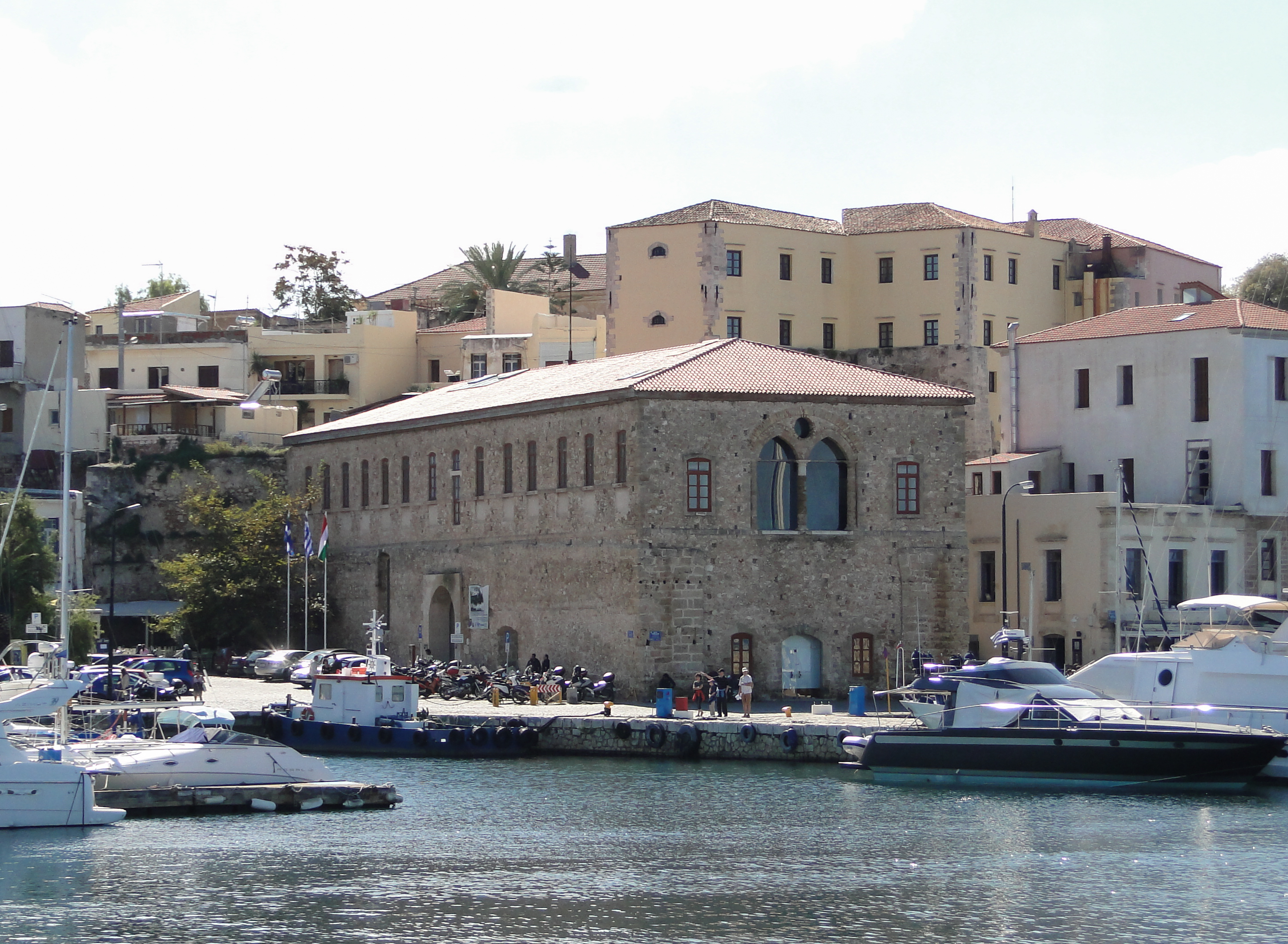
Center of Mediterranean architecture.

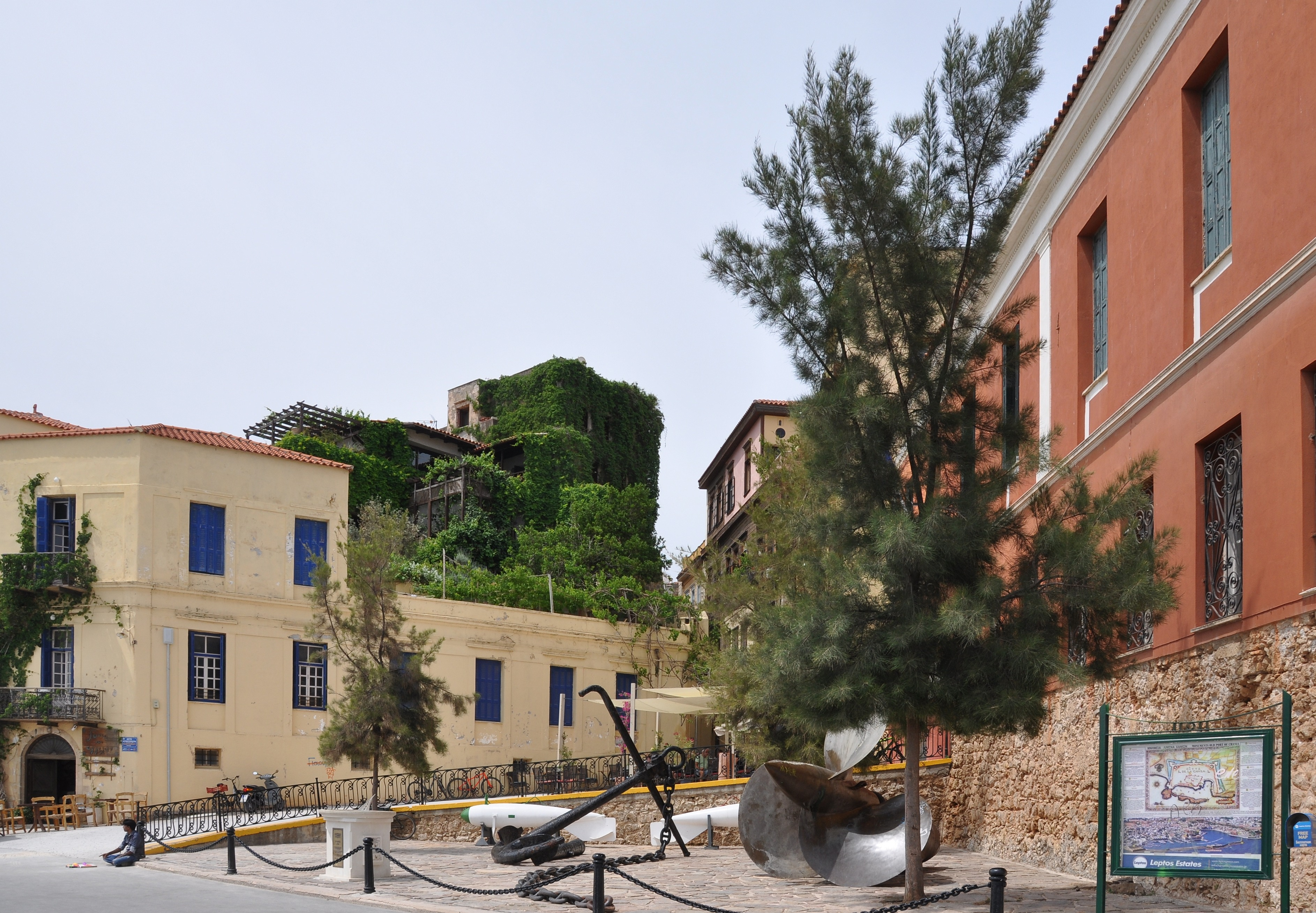
Nautical Museum of Crete

There are several museums, art galleries, theatre and music groups, educational and research institutions within the city.

The most important museums in Chania are:

- Chania's new Archaeological Museum at 15 Skra Str. Chalepa, Chania, replaces the former Archeological Museum of Chania. The museum houses findings from different parts of the region and from several historical and prehistorical periods.
- Folklore Museum (Old Town)
- Historical Archive (the second most important in Greece)
- Nautical Museum of Crete (Old Town)
- Municipal Art Gallery
- Byzantine/Post-Byzantine Collection (Old Town)
- Museum-Venizelos Residence
- Museum of Chemistry
- School life museum
- Museum of Typography, Chania

Several theatre groups are active in Chania with the most important being the Municipal and Regional Theatre of Crete (DI.PE.THE.K). The repertoire includes old and contemporary plays from Greek and foreign writers. A number of traditional [Cretan] musicians are also active in town.

There are five cinemas (three of them open-air), concentrating both in commercial and independent movies and occasionally organizing small festivals.

Landmarks include the Chania Lighthouse on the old Venetian harbour (built in 1864), and the old Central Markets (built in 1913, renovated in 2026).

There are numerous cafes, restaurants and bars throughout the Old Town and especially around the old Venetian harbour, at Enetiki Tafros (Venetian moat) and at Splantzia square, but also along the waterfront of the Koum Kapi and Nea Hora neighbourhoods. In summer, the bars and restaurants at Platanias and Agia Marina are also busy.

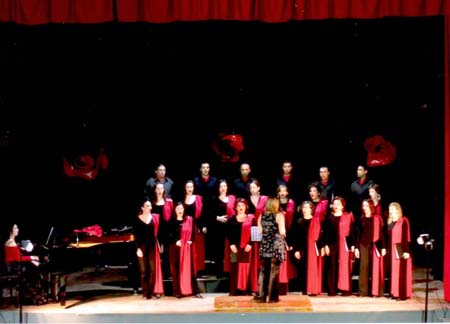
A snapshot from a cultural event in Chania.

During the summer period, a variety of cultural events take place on a daily basis. Theatrical plays, concerts and several exhibitions from Greek and foreign artists are organized either by the municipality or by individuals. A venue which hosts many of these events is a theater located in the east bulwark of the Old Town ("Anatoliki Tafros"). Also, several festivals, conferences and sport events take place in Chania, especially between May and September.

A major role in the city's cultural life is played by the Municipal Cultural Corporation of Chania (DI.P.E.X.) which organizes a significant part of the events taking place throughout the year.

There is a French, a German, an Italian and a Swedish consulate in Chania.

== Sports ==
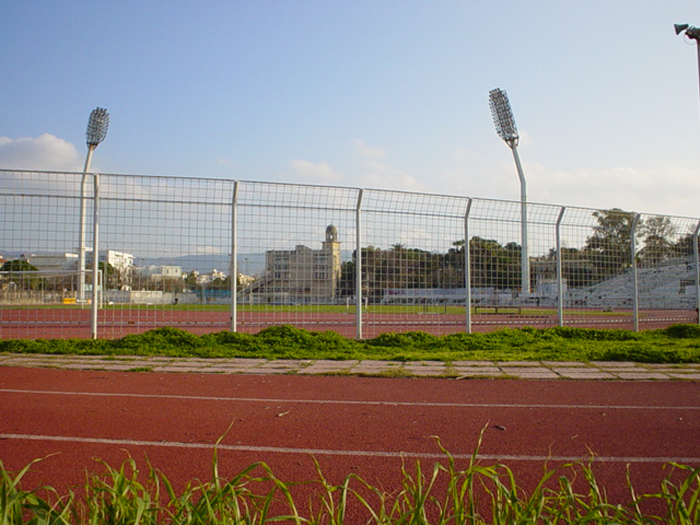
The old Stadium of Chania.

Water sports are very popular in Chania. The local water polo team, Nautical Club of Chania, N.O.X. has managed to be a protagonist in the primary league of the Greek national championship for years. Several athletes of this team have also played for Greece men's national water polo team, which has achieved major international successes.

Football and basketball are also very popular in the town, however not as successful. The main football team is Chania City F.C. (whose home ground is the Perivolia Municipal Stadium). Platanias FC (originally based at Maleme stadium near the town of Platanias) played in the top tier Greek Super League between 2012-2013 and 2017-2018. Platanias also played at Perivolia stadium during this period before returning to the smaller Maleme stadium after relegation.

The main clubs for athletics are "Eleftherios Venizelos" and "Kydon". The "Antisfairisi" club is specialized in tennis, table tennis and also has a significant tradition in chess. Many of the above sports are being practiced in the old Stadium of Chania, built in 1935 with the financial support of Elena Venizelou, then wife of Eleftherios Venizelos.

There is an open swimming pool for water sports in the suburb of Nea Chora. A new indoor pool, which was built on the nearby Akrotiri Peninsula in 2006, has not yet opened to the public because of the estimated operational costs.

A modern indoor stadium for basketball, volleyball and other indoor sports and events, called Chania Kladissos Indoor Hall, was also built in 2005 near Nea Chora (Kladissos area).

There is an active climbing and hiking club (Greek Mountaineering Club of Chania, E.O.S. Chanion) organizing weekly excursions of varying difficulty on the mountains of Crete and several other longer term missions in mainland Greece and abroad.

== Education and research ==
Educational institutions located at the greater area of the city are:

- Technical University of Crete
- The Chania branch of the Technological Educational Institute of Crete
- The Mediterranean Agronomic Institute of Chania
- The Merchant Marine Academy of Crete (AEN KRITIS)

Other research and intellectual institutes and societies in Chania are:

- The National Research Foundation "Eleftherios K. Venizelos"
- The Mediterranean Architecture Centre (KAM)
- The Institute of Olive Tree and Subtropical Plants of Chania
- The Institute of Cretan Law
- The Historical, Laographical and Archaeological Society of Crete
- Institute of Regional Press, Chania

Primary and secondary schools are mainly public in Chania (as in all cities in Greece). However, there has been a slow development of some private high schools recently. Among the "Eniaia Lykeia" (Unified Upper Secondary Schools) of the town there is an autonomous Ecclesiastical Lyceum in Agios Mattheos.

== Economy ==
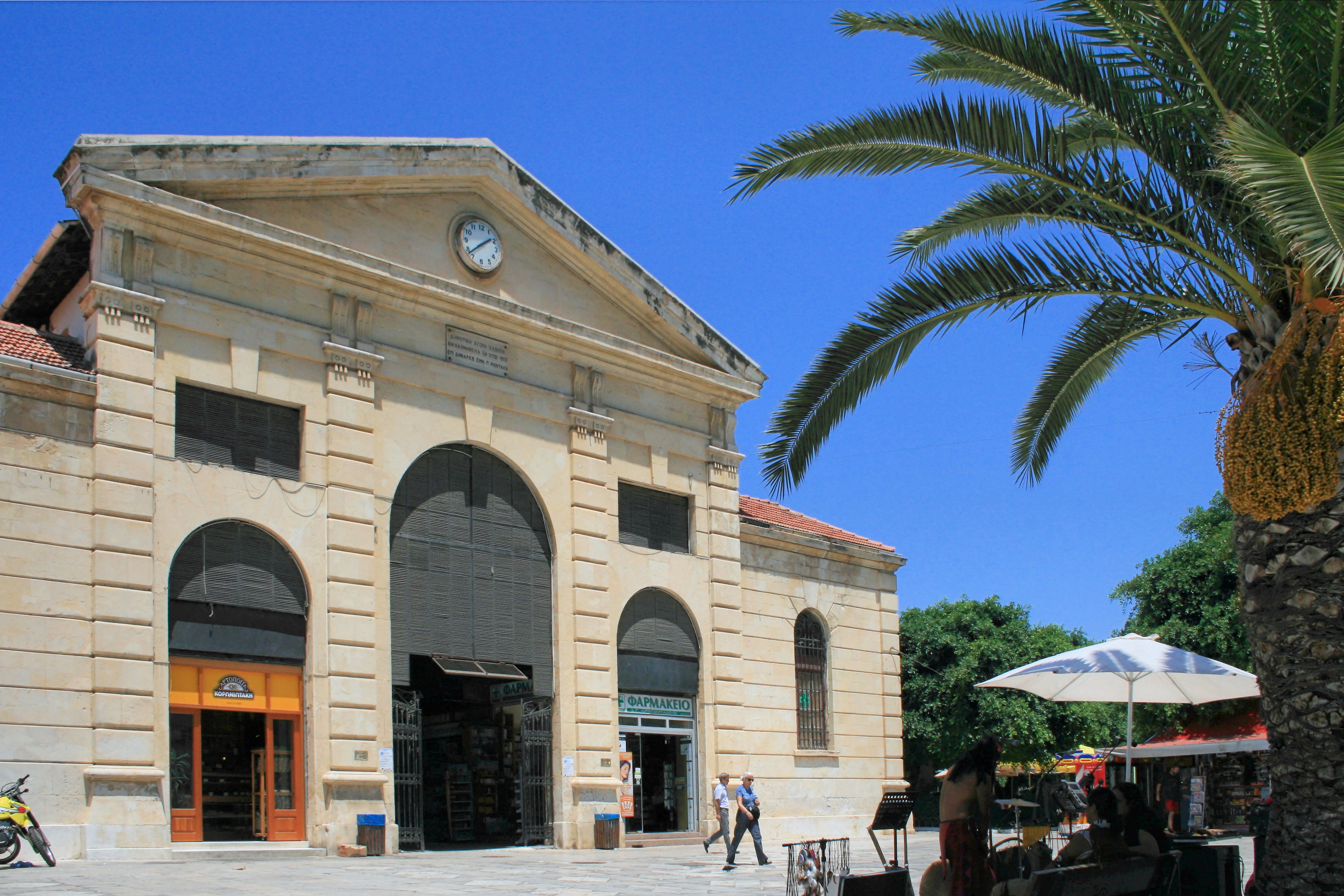
The central market ("Agora")

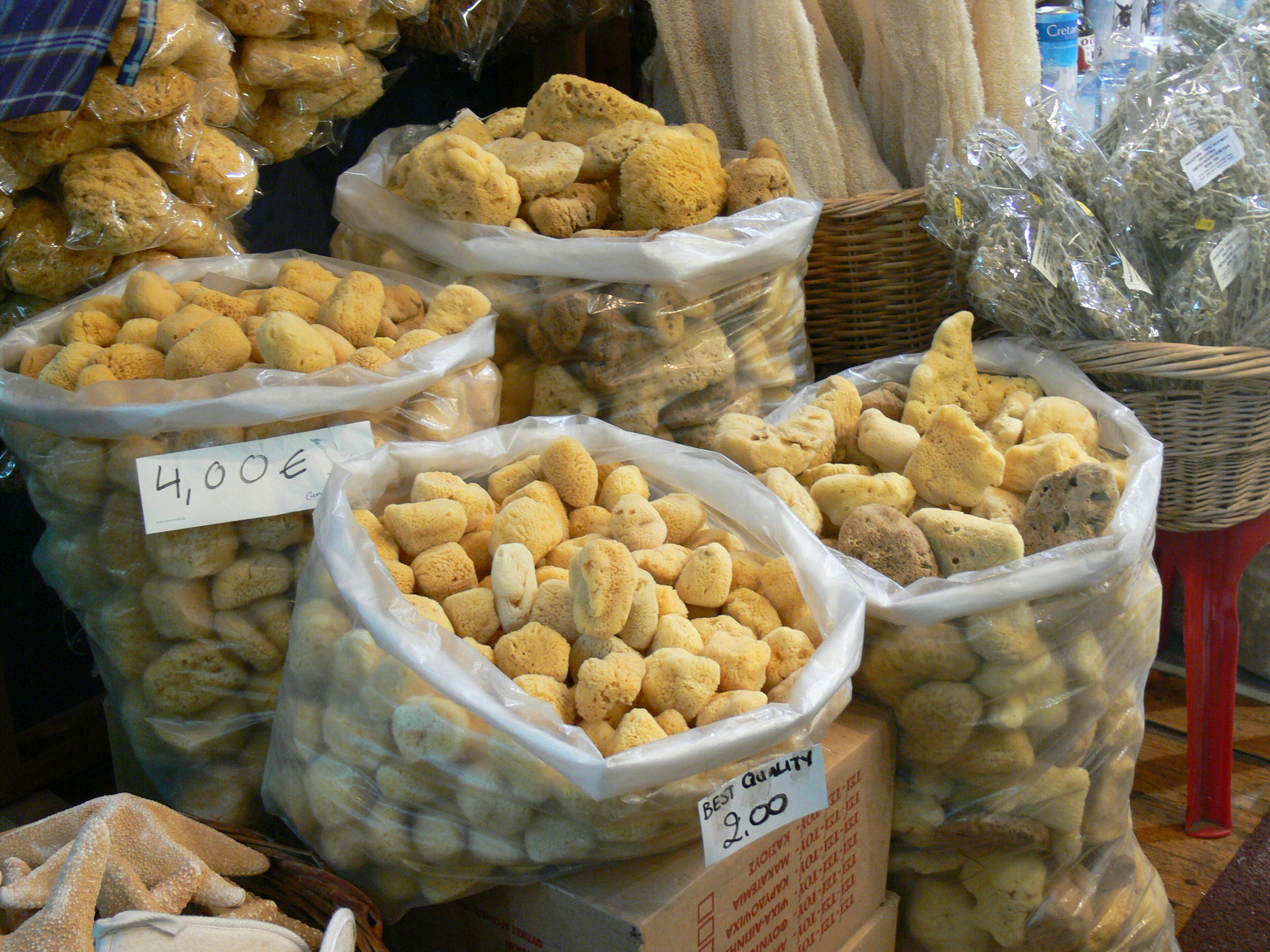
Sponges for sale in the Agora

Two main sources of wealth in Chania are agriculture and tourism. A large portion of the city's residents (not necessarily farmers) own many hectares of agricultural land where several plants are being cultivated, the most common ones being olive trees and citrus. Other important products include wine, avocados, dairy, honey etc. The organization of the Agricultural August has been a recent attempt to promote local quality products including a series of activities organised by the Prefecture of Chania since 1999 has proved very successful.

On the other hand, starting from the early 1970s, tourism has developed rapidly. Nowadays the tertiary sector is becoming more and more important for the locals, since an increasing number of them are participating in the business.

An important centre of the economic activities in the town is the Chania Chamber of Commerce and Industry (E.B.E.X.).

Chania, has seen notable changes in its luxury residential market, reflecting its growing appeal to affluent tourists and expatriates. According to a report titled "Chania Construction Market Trends for 2025-2028" the annual change in luxury residential prices in 2024 for Chania has been significantly increased to 26% compared to 2021. This trend indicates a rising demand for high-end accommodations and properties, further boosting the tourism and real estate sectors.

== Health care ==
The main hospital in the city is the General Hospital "Agios Georgios". Other health institutions include the Crete Naval Hospital, the branch of the National Centre for Emergency Medical Care (E.K.A.B.), and the Clinic of Chronic Disease. The Chania branch of the Organisation Against Drugs (Ο.ΚΑ.ΝΑ.) opened in 2003.

The city has a number of private clinics (e.g., Iasis and Central Clinic of Chania), as well as medical centres specialising in various areas.

== Transport ==
The city is served by Chania International Airport (IATA code: CHQ) 14 km from Chania on the Akrotiri Peninsula. The airport is named after Daskalogiannis, a Sfakiot hero who was skinned alive by the Ottomans in the 18th century.

Souda, some 7 km (4.3 mi) east of Chania, is the city's port, with daily ferries to Piraeus. Souda also hosts Crete Naval Base, a major Greek and NATO base. Kissamos port, 41 km (25.5 mi) to the west of Chania, has ferry connections to Kythira Island, Antikythera Island, and the Peloponnese region.

The A90 motorway runs along the north coast of Crete connecting Chania to Kissamos in the west and Heraklion and Sitia to the east. It is currently being upgraded to motorway standard and is expected to be completed by 2030.

== Notable residents ==
- Elpis Melena (1818–1899), born as Marie Espérance von Schwartz, German writer
- Eleftherios Venizelos (1864–1936), prime minister of Greece 1910–1920, 1924, 1928–1932, 1933; widely considered as the most important statesman of modern Greece born in the village Therisso
- Alexis Minotis (1898–1990), stage and screen actor active between the 1930s–1980s
- Constantine Mitsotakis (1918–2017), politician, prime minister of Greece 1990–1993, and later the honorary president of the New Democracy party. Father of prime minister Kyriakos Mitsotakis and former foreign minister Dora Bakoyianni.
- George Psychoundakis (1920–2006), Cretan WW II hero and author
- John Craxton (1922–2009), painter and British honorary consul
- Maro Douka (1947–), novelist
- Ioanna Karystiani (1952–), novelist
- Christos Sartzetakis (1929–2022), President of the Third Hellenic Republic from 1985 to 1990
- Mikis Theodorakis (1925–2021), composer
- Nikos Christodoulakis (1952–), politician, economics professor and electronics engineer, Minister for Economy and Finance of Greece from 2001 to 2004
- Nana Mouskouri (1934–), singer, one of the top-selling female singers of all time
- John Aniston (1933–2022), actor and father of well-known American actress Jennifer Aniston
- Eftichios Vlahakis (1935–2014), Greek-American entrepreneur
- Antonia Papatznaki (1960-), Visual artist
- Charis Galanakis (1981–), agricultural, food and environmental scientist
- Triantafillia Manolioudaki (1986–), Water polo Player
- Mihalis Anastasakis (1994–), Hammer throw athlete
- Christos Frantzeskakis (2000–), Hammer throw athlete
- Apostolos Papastamos (2001–), 2020 Olympic swimmer
- Stefanos Kasselakis (1988–), candidate for the 2023 SYRIZA leadership

== Twin towns – sister cities ==
Chania is twinned with:

- Engomi, Cyprus
- Famagusta, Cyprus
- Paphos, Cyprus
- Polis, Cyprus
- Axioupoli, Greece
- Ermoupoli, Greece
- Karpathos, Greece
- Žilina, Slovakia

== Gallery ==
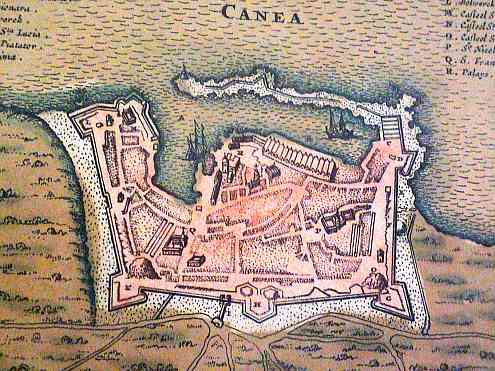
Map of Chania, 1680

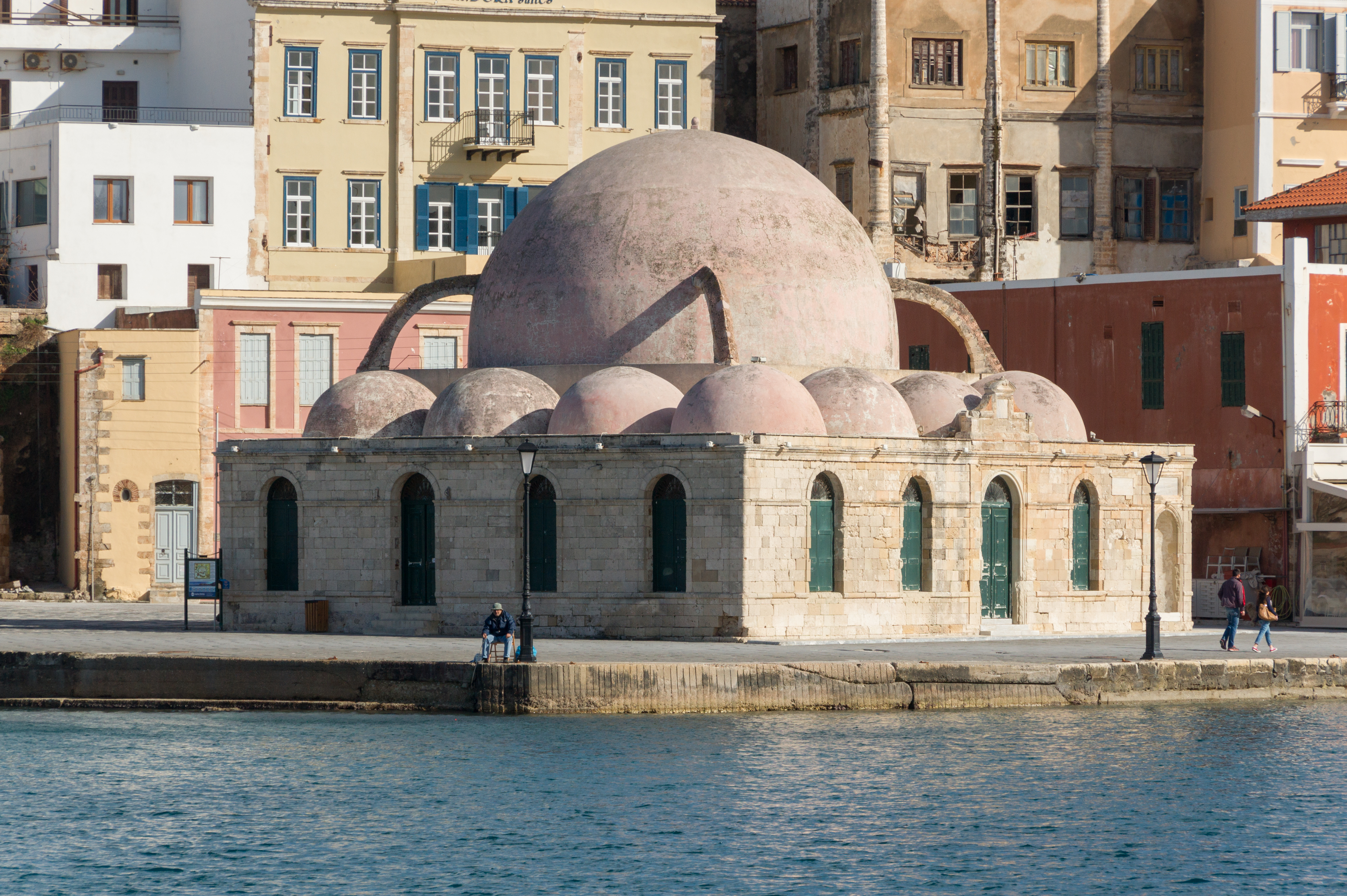
Küçük Hasan Pasha Mosque, Ottoman mosque now used as an exhibition hall

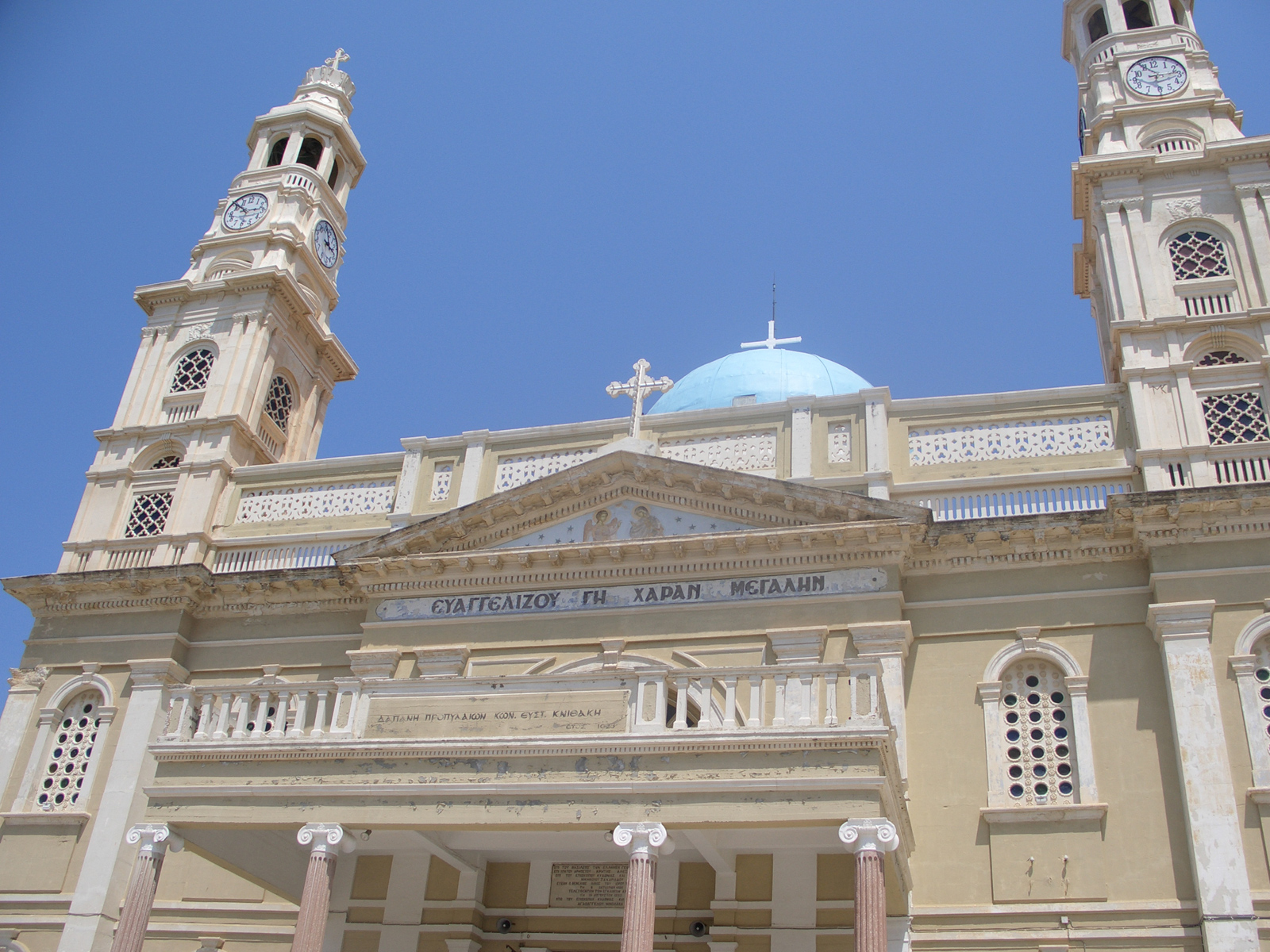
Evangelistria church

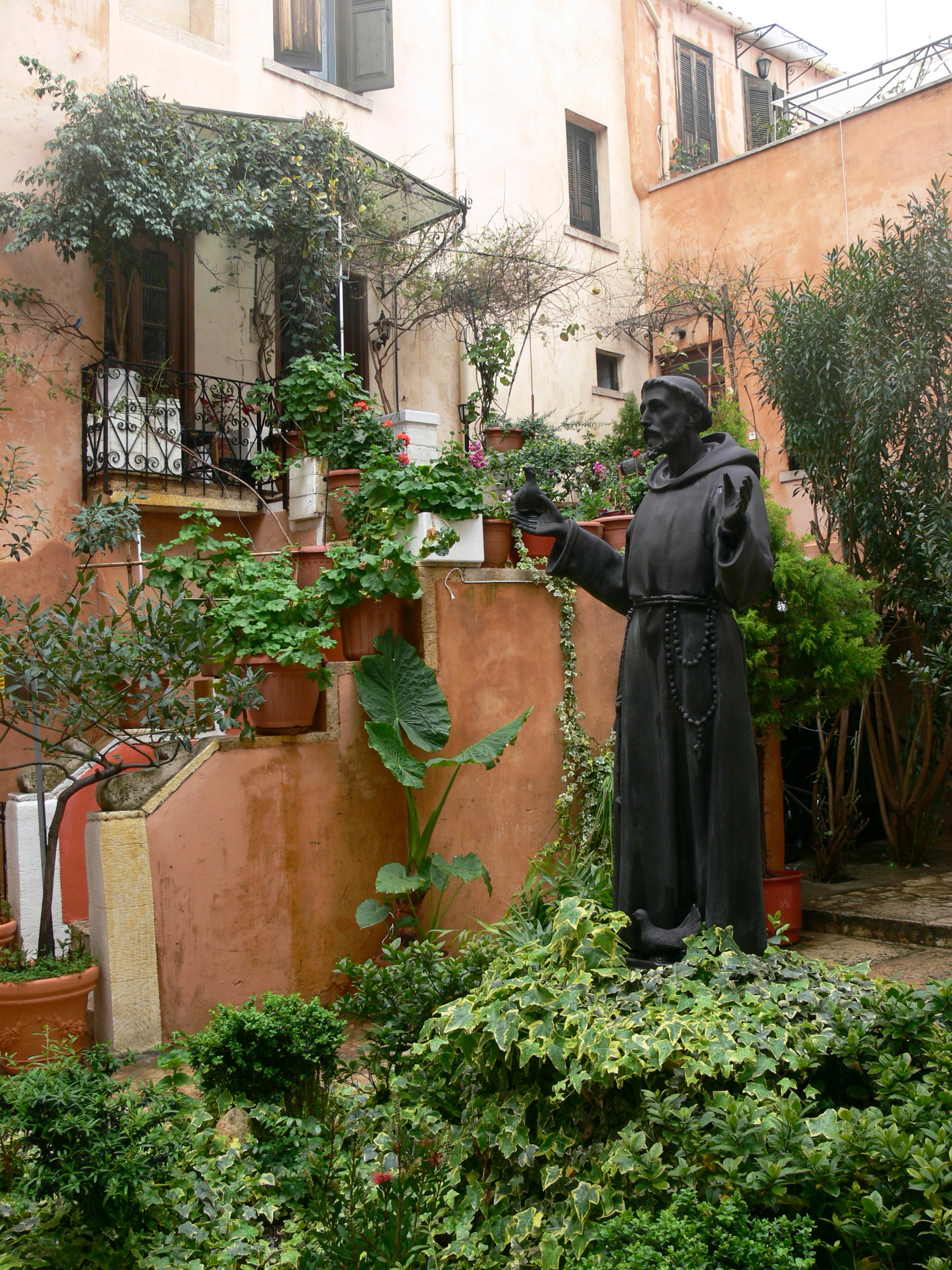
Statue of Francis of Assisi outside the Catholic church of Chania

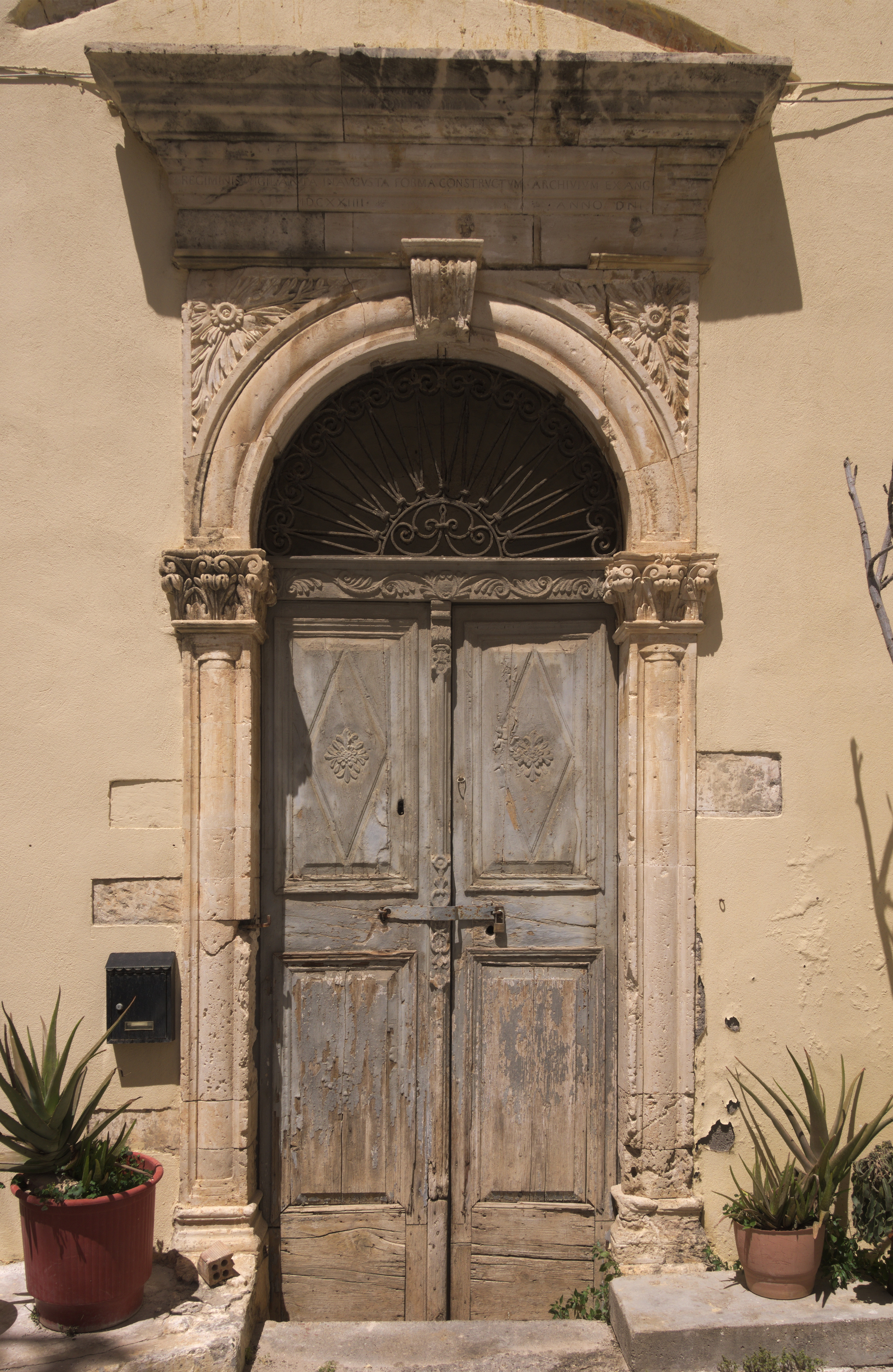
View from the old Venetian quarter

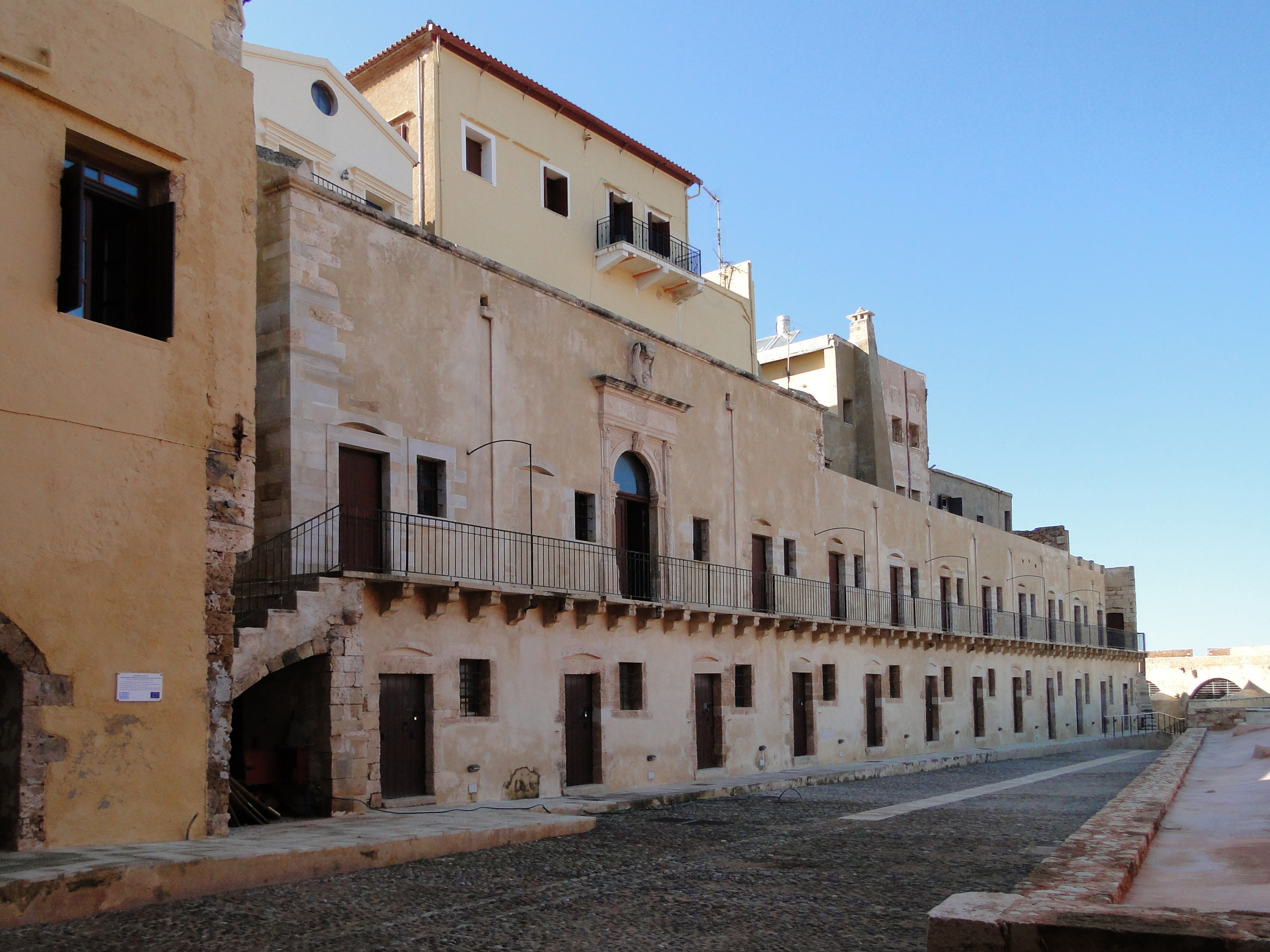
Inside the Firkas Fortress

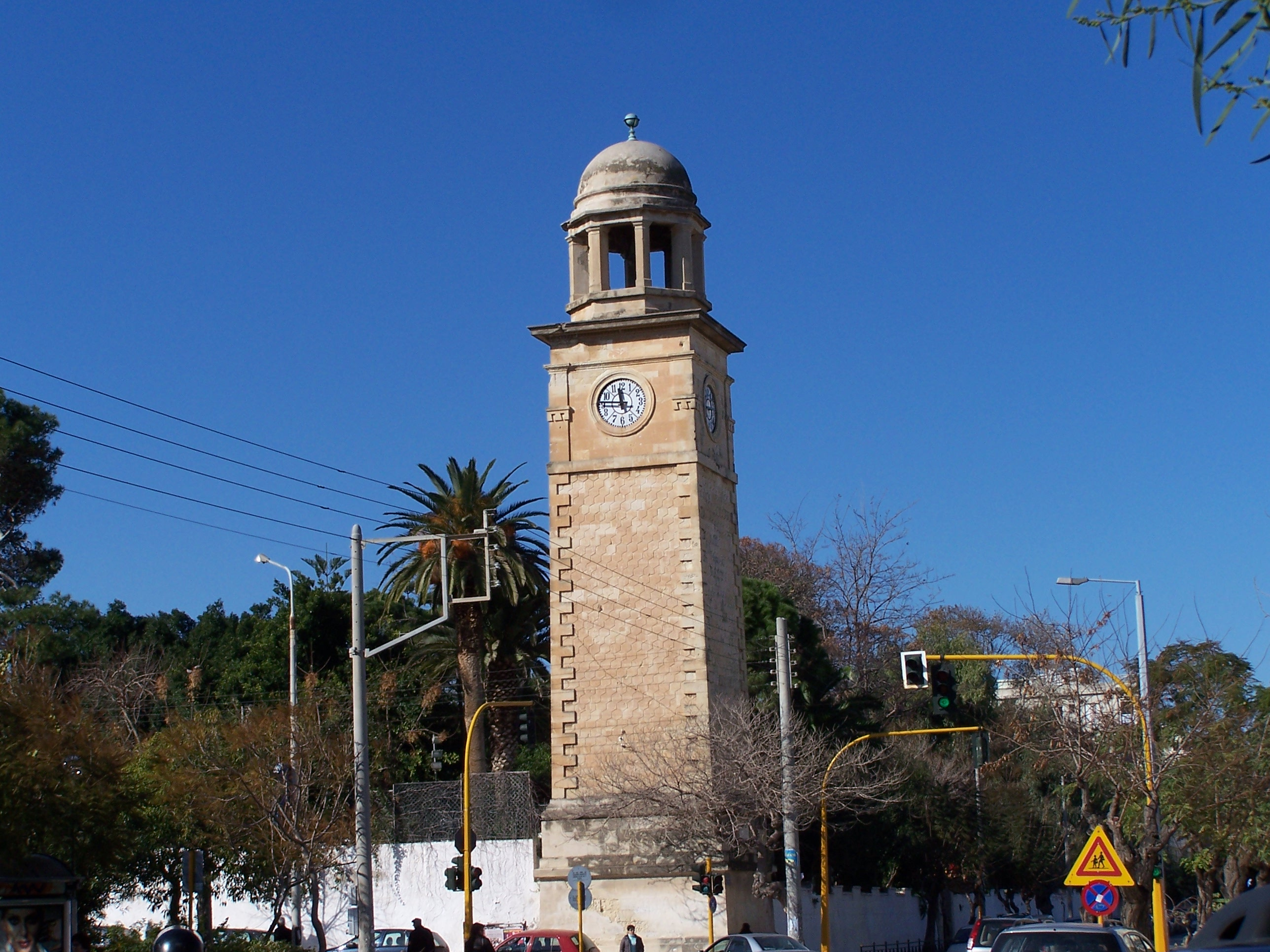
Clock tower of Chania

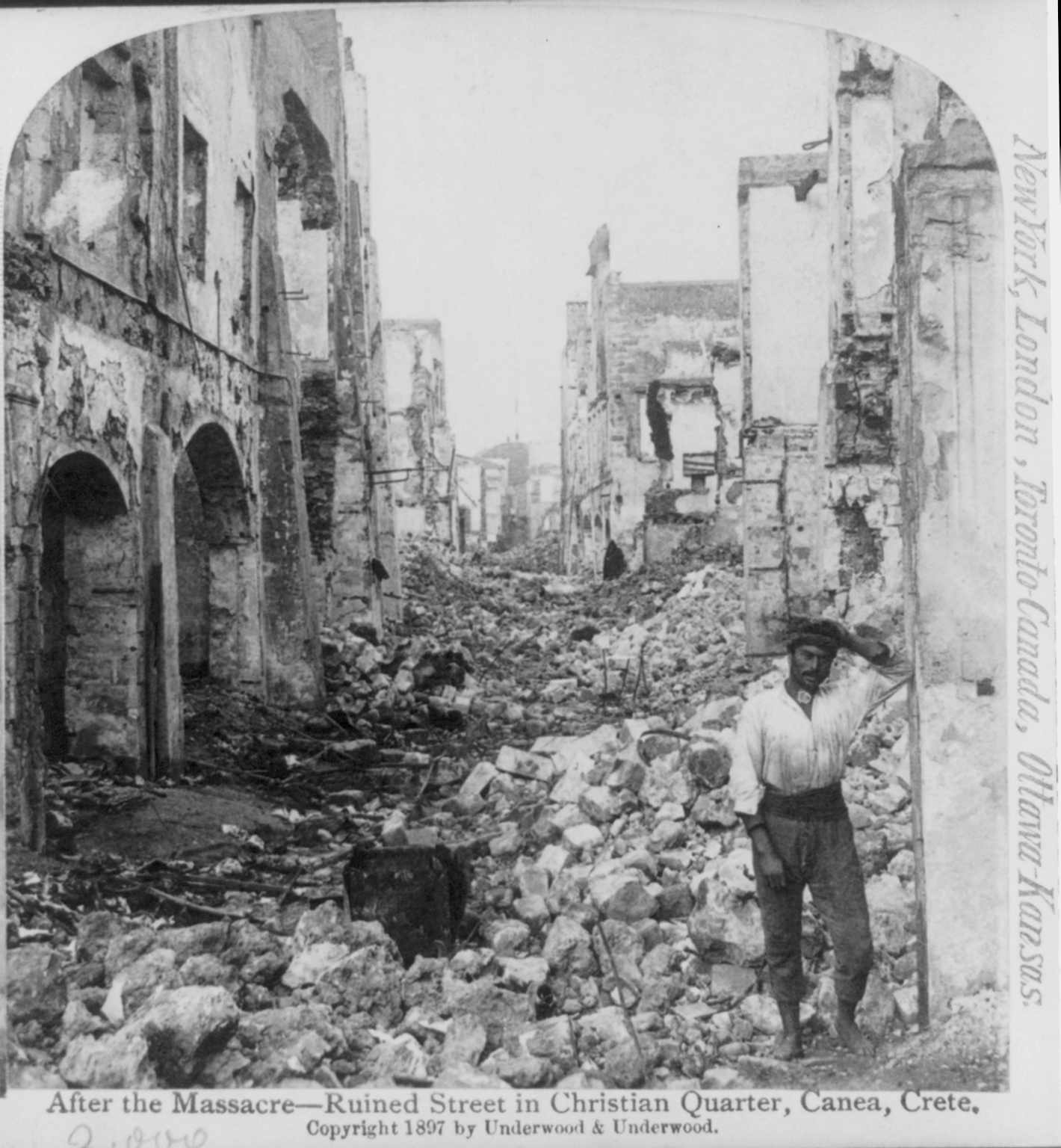
A ruined street in Chania's Christian quarter following fighting between the town's Christians and Muslims, 1897.

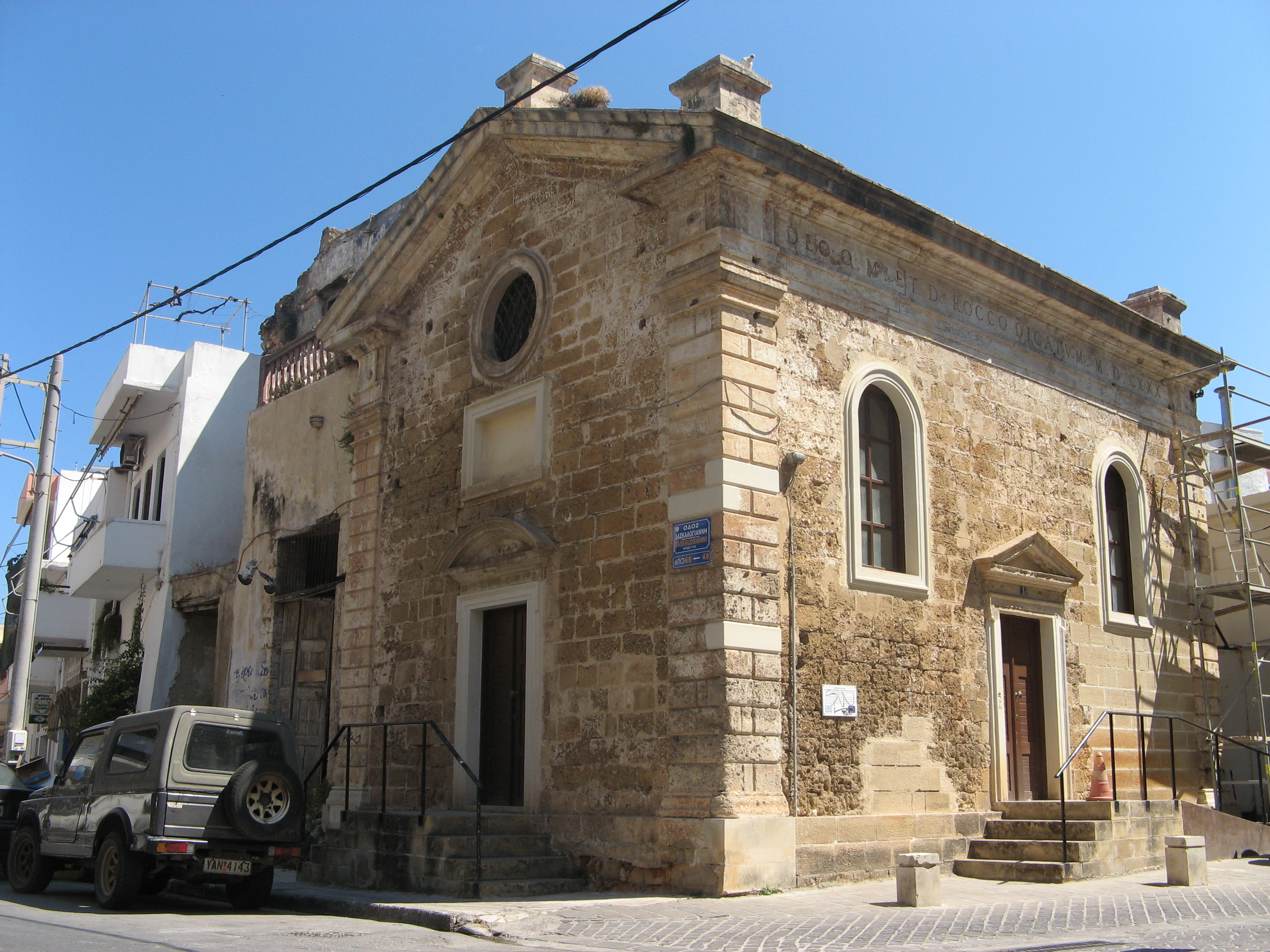
The church of Saint Rocco in Splantzia.

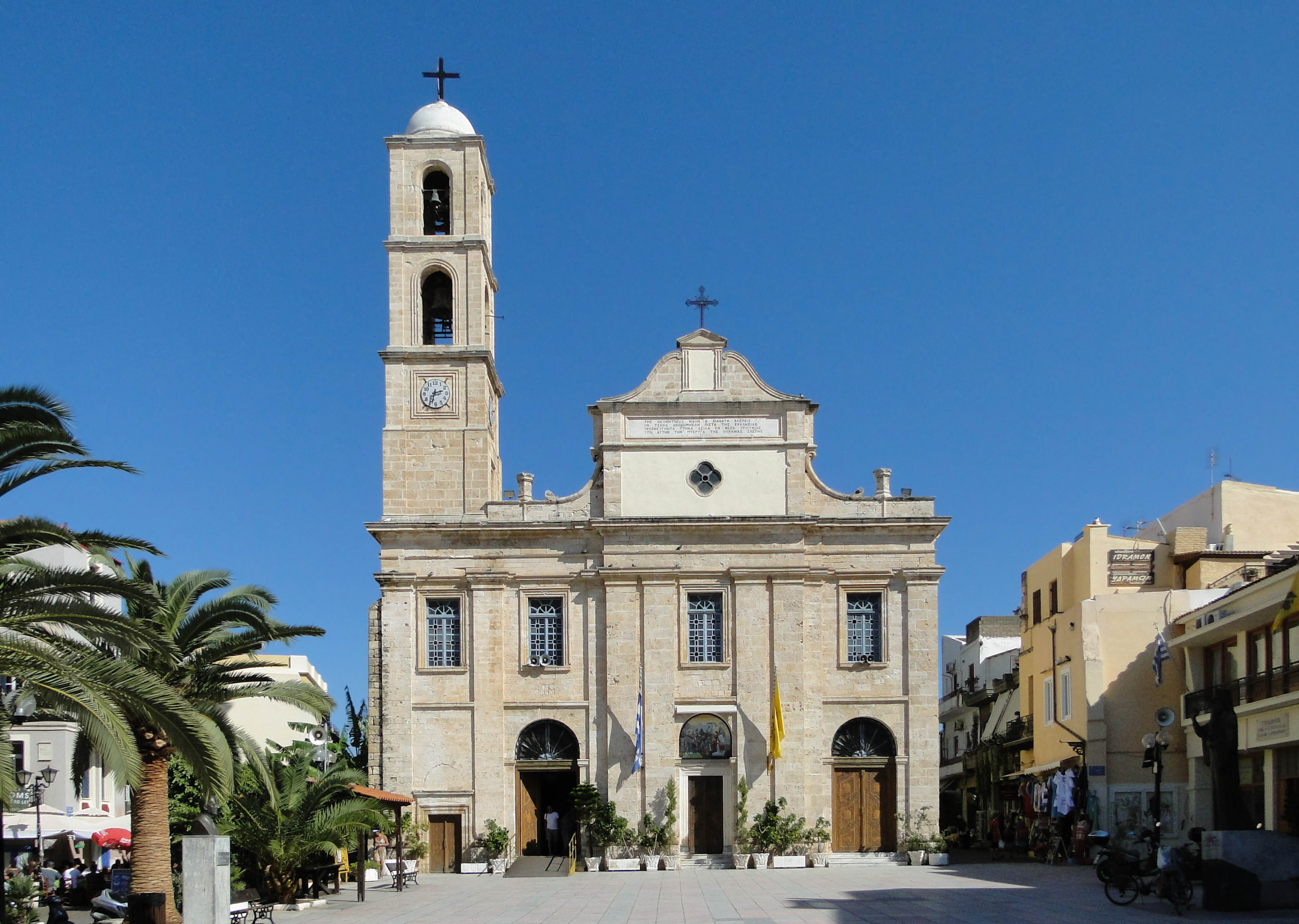
The Orthodox Cathedral.

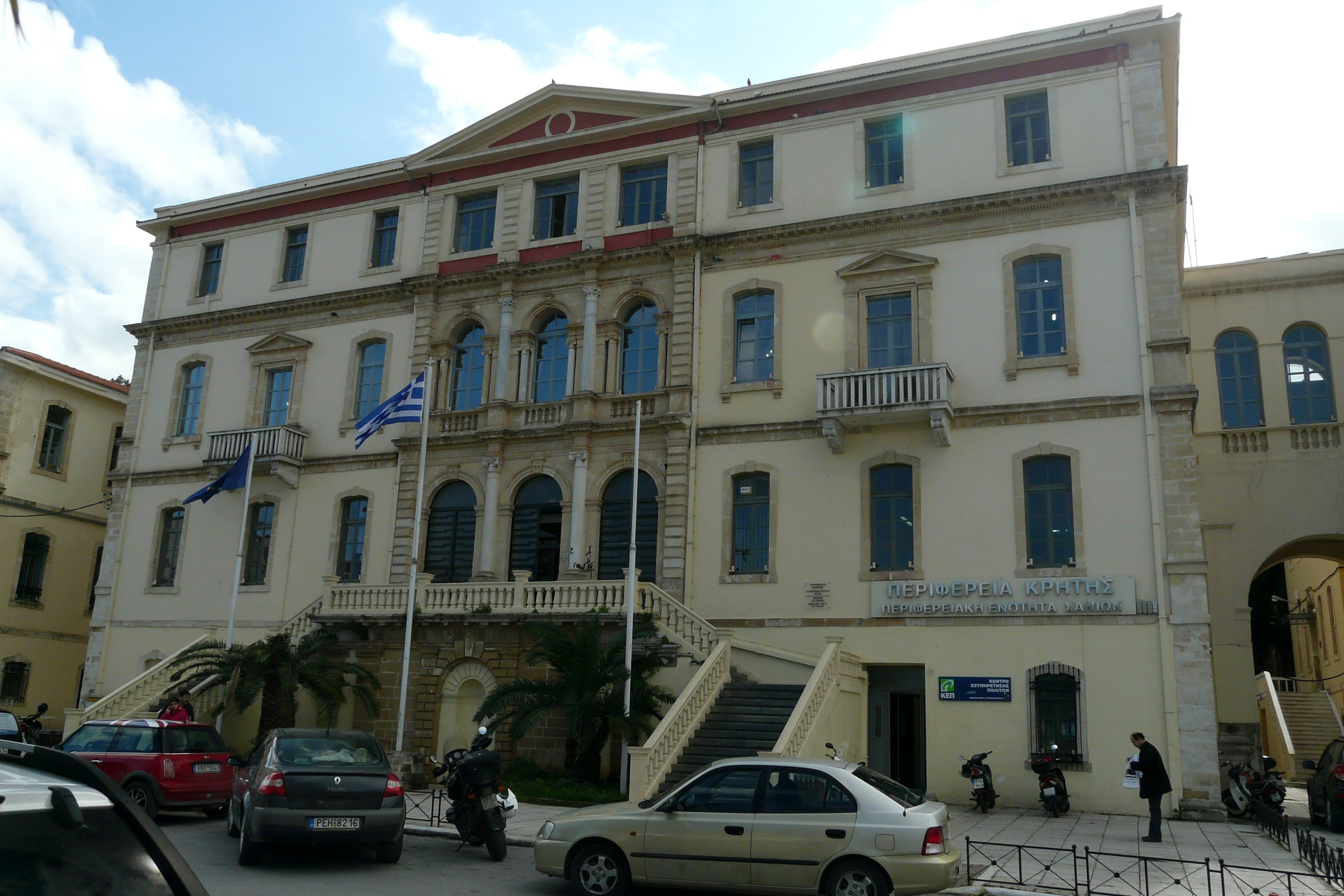
Prefecture building, Eleftherias Square

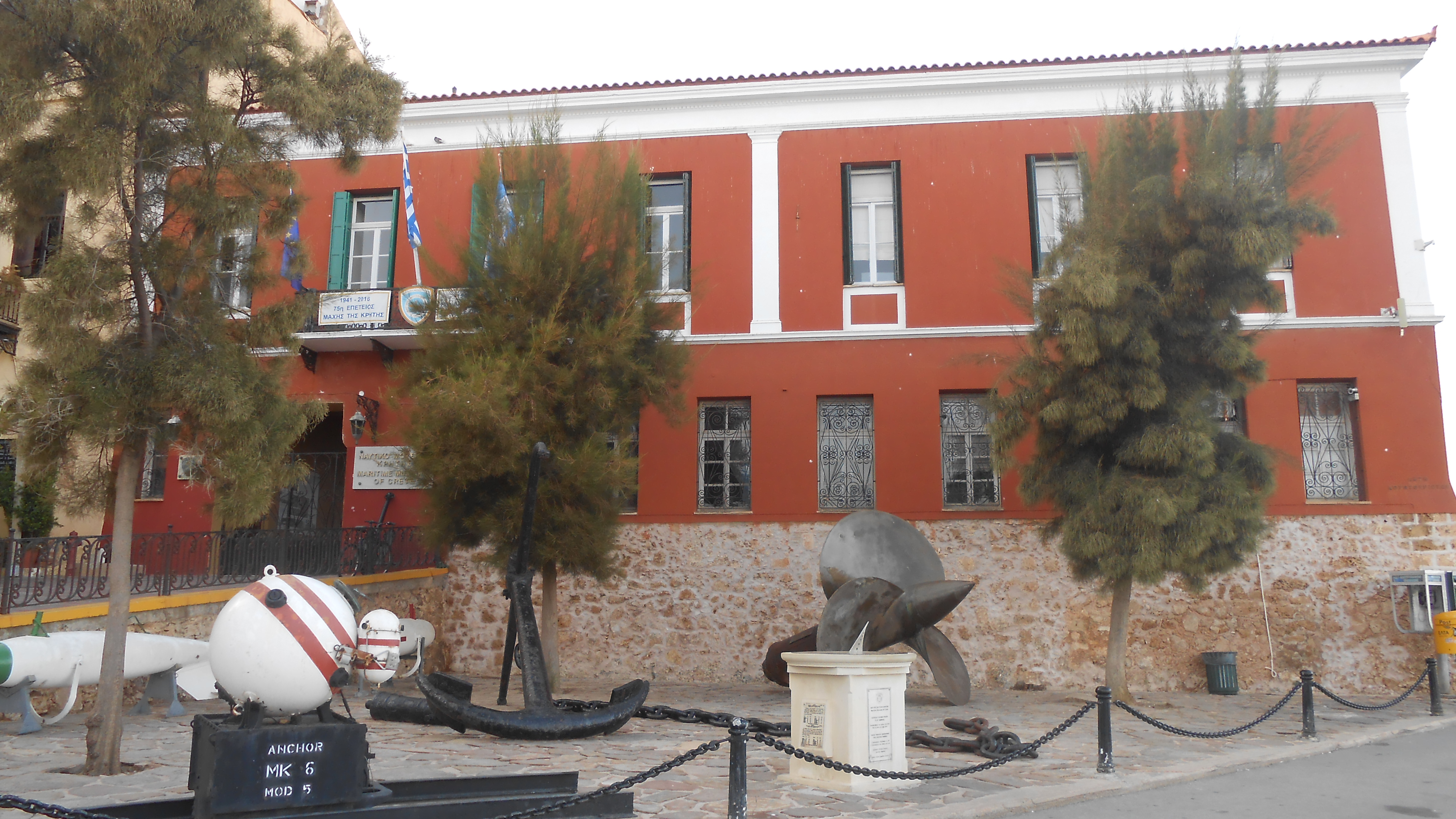
Maritime Museum of Crete

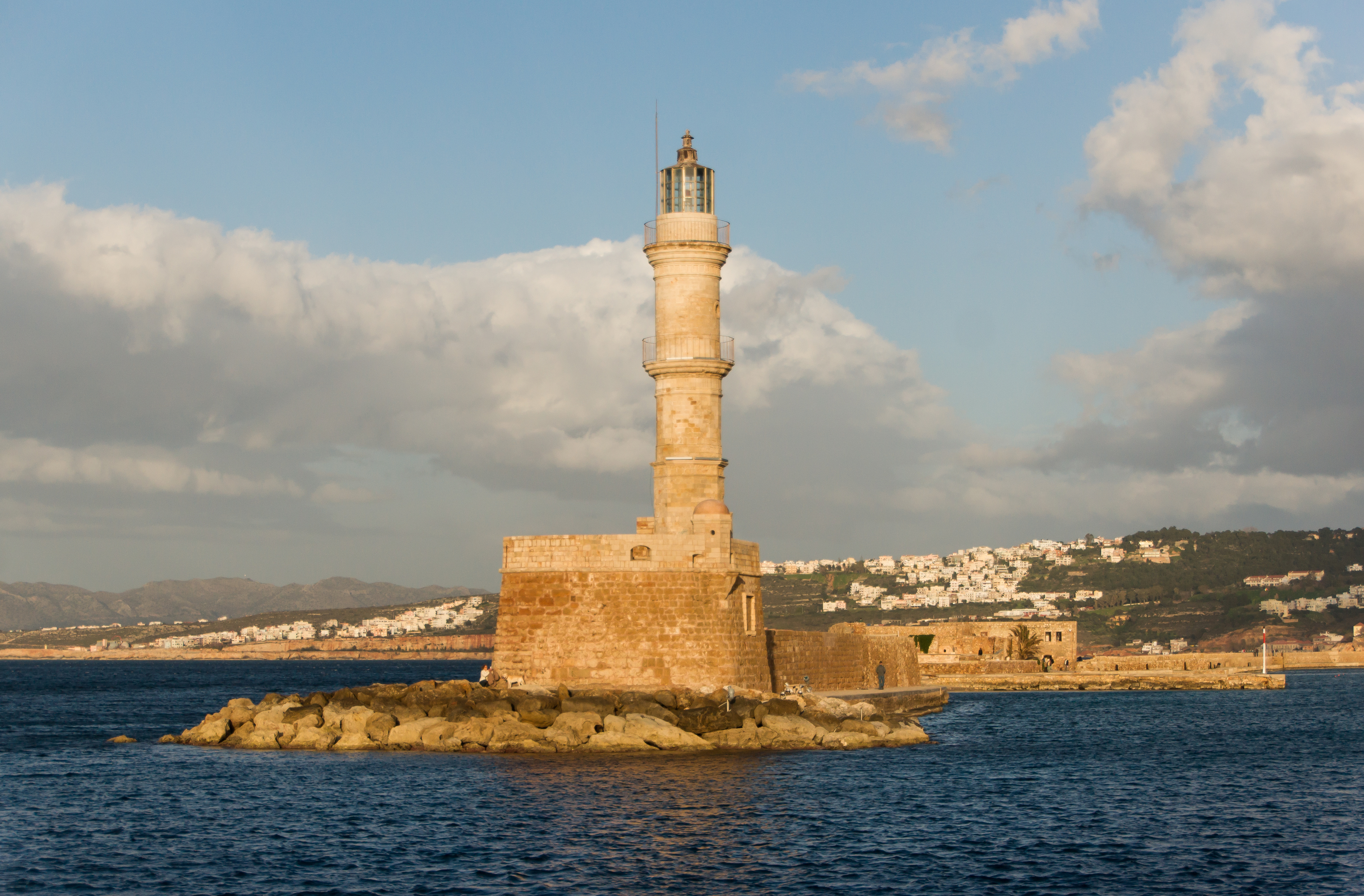
Chania Lighthouse

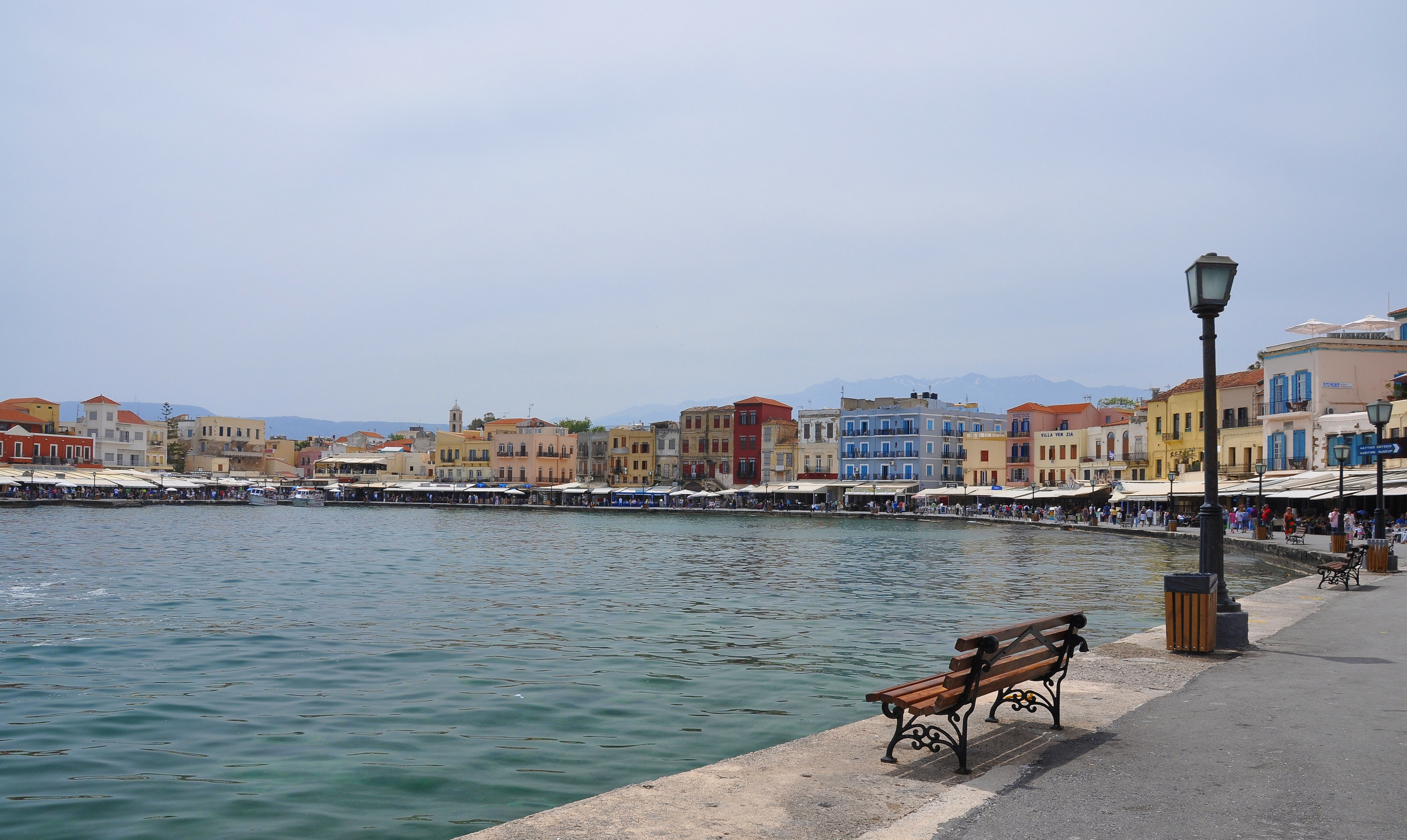
View of the promenade

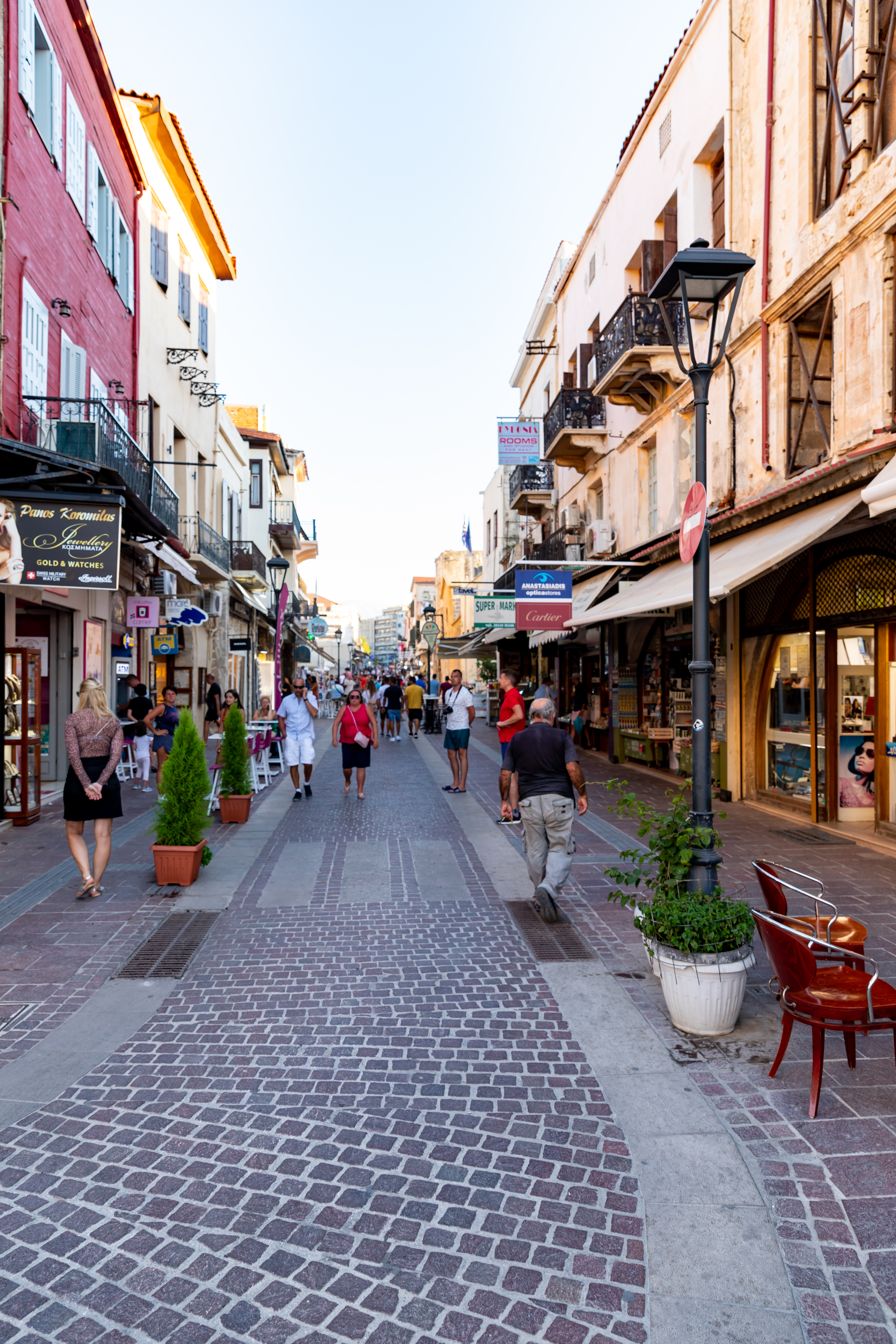
A street in the old town

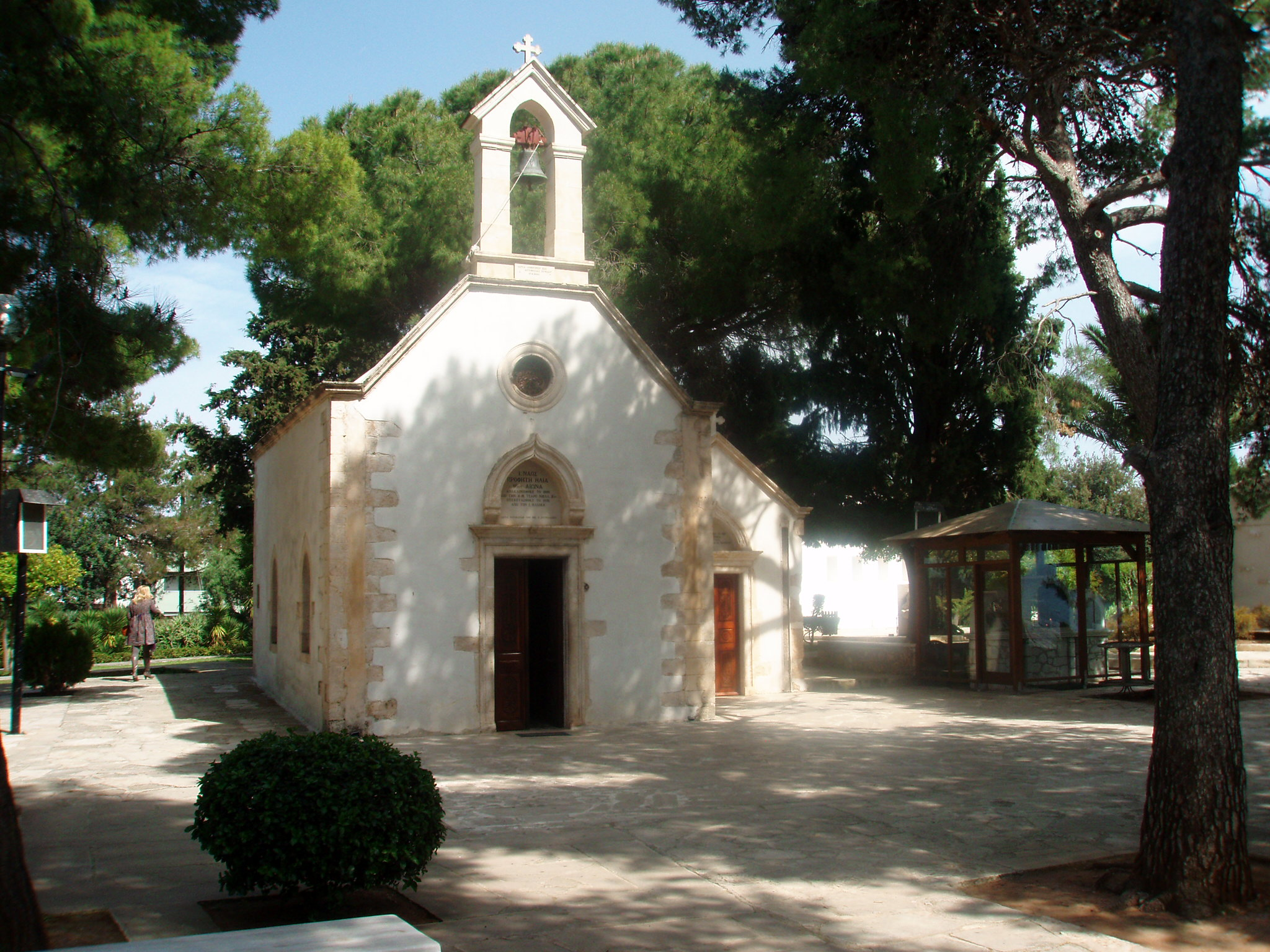
Church of St Elijah at the Venizelos Graves

== See also ==
- Cretan cuisine
- Chania Power Station
- List of settlements in the Chania regional unit
- Mount Tityros
- Presentation of the Virgin Mary Cathedral, Chania (Greek Orthodox)
- Assumption Cathedral, Chania (Roman Catholic)
