= Maro Douka =

Greek writer (born 1947)

- Born: 1947 (age 78–79); Chania, Greece
- Occupation: Novelist
- Writing career
- Period: 1974–present

Maro Douka (Greek: Μάρω Δούκα; born 1947) is a Greek novelist. She has lived in Athens since 1966 and she studied History and Archaeology at the University of Athens. She belongs to the so-called Genia tou 70, which is a literary term referring to Greek authors who began publishing their work during the 1970s; her debut work, Η Πηγάδα, based on her imprisonment in 1967 by the Military Junta, was published in 1974, just a few months after the Metapolitefsi.

She was awarded the Nikos Kazantzakis Prize of the Municipality of Heraklion for Η αρχαία σκουριά and the Greek State Prize for Literature for Η πλωτή πόλη (declining the latter). Αθώοι και φταίχτες, was awarded the Balkanika Prize for Literature, the Kostas and Eleni Ouranis Prize of the Academy of Athens and the Cavafy prize. She has also been awarded the N. Themelis prize for her last novel Έλα να πούμε ψέματα.

She is a founding member of the Hellenic Authors' Society. At the 2014 local elections, she was elected to the City Council of Athens under the "Anoihti Poli" Syriza ticket, led by the candidate Gabriel Sakellaridis.

== Works ==
=== Novels ===
- Η αρχαία σκουριά (Fool's Gold), 1979 (translated into English, French, Italian, Serbian and Albanian).
- Η πλωτή πόλη (The Floating City), 1983 (translated into German)
- Οι λεύκες ασάλευτες (The Immobile Aspens), 1987
- Εις τον πάτο της εικόνας (At the Bottom of the Picture), 1990 (translated into French)
- Ένας σκούφος από πορφύρα (Come Forth, King), 1995 (translated into English and Italian)
- Ουράνια μηχανική (Celestial Mechanics), 1999 (translated into Italian)
- Αθώοι και φταίχτες (The Innocent and the Guilty), 2004 (translated into Serbian, Turkish and Lithuanian)
- Το δίκιο είναι ζόρικο πολύ (Justice is something very hard), 2010
- Έλα να πούμε ψέματα (Come, let us tell lies), 2014
- Πύλη Εισόδου, 2019
- Να είχα, λέει, μια τρομπέτα, 2022

=== Short fiction ===
- Η Πηγάδα (The Cauldron), 1974
- Πού ’ναι τα φτερά; (Where are the Wings?), 1975
- Καρέ φιξ (Carré Fixe), 1976
- Γιατί εμένα η ψυχή μου (Because my soul), 2012

=== Non-fiction ===
- Ο πεζογράφος και το πιθάρι του (The Writer and his Jar), 1992
- Τα μαύρα λουστρίνια (The Black Leather Shoes), 2005
- Τίποτα δεν χαρίζεται (Nothing is for granted), 2016

=== Theater ===
- Σας αρέσει ο Μπραμς; (Do you like Brahms?), 2001
