= Van Vlahakis =

American entrepreneur

- Born: Eftychios Vlahakis; January 14, 1935; Chania, Crete, Greece
- Died: April 6, 2014 (aged 79); Key Largo, Florida, US

Eftychios Vlahakis (Greek: Ευτύχιος Βλαχάκης; January 14, 1935 – April 6, 2014), known as Van Vlahakis, was an American entrepreneur of Greek origin, regarded as a pioneer of environmentally friendly cleaning products.

== Early life ==
Vlahakis was born in Chania, Crete, but in fall 1953 at the age of 18 immigrated to Chicago in search of a better future. There he lived in homeless shelters and supported himself with jobs in bars and restaurants. In parallel, he studied chemistry at Roosevelt University and earned a bachelor's degree in 1958.

== Business career ==
After graduating Vlahakis worked in the cleaning products industry. During this time his exposure to harsh chemicals, that made him suffer from headaches and other irritations, led him to develop a safer alternative. In 1967 Vlahakis founded Venus Laboratories in his garage and sold environmentally friendly cleaners. Venus expanded quickly due to the safer formulas that attracted a new audience of people interested in plant-based alternatives. In 1989, the company's name was changed to the current Earth Friendly Products. Today Earth Friendly Products operates four sustainable manufacturing facilities in the United States, and its ECOS plant-based laundry detergent and household cleaning products are sold at major club stores, grocery retailers, and natural foods stores in the U.S. and internationally.

Vlahakis' life story was the basis for the 2013 film A Green Story.
