= List of settlements in the Chania regional unit =

This is a list of settlements in the Chania regional unit, Greece.

- Afrata
- Agia Marina
- Agia Roumeli
- Agia
- Agia Eirini
- Agios Ioannis
- Alikampos
- Alikianos
- Amygdalokefali
- Anopoli
- Anoskeli
- Aptera
- Armenoi
- Aroni
- Asfendos
- Asi Gonia
- Askyfou
- Chairethiana
- Chania
- Chora Sfakion
- Chordaki
- Chrysavgi
- Daratsos
- Deliana
- Drakona
- Drakona
- Drapanias
- Elos
- Emprosneros
- Epanochori
- Episkopi
- Faleliana
- Fournes
- Fres
- Fylaki
- Galatas
- Gavalochori
- Georgioupoli
- Gerani
- Glossa
- Gramvousa
- Impros
- Kaina
- Kakodiki
- Kakopetros
- Kalamitsi
- Kalamitsi
- Kalathenes
- Kallergiana
- Kaloudiana
- Kalydonia
- Kalyves
- Kamisiana
- Kampanos
- Kampoi
- Kampos
- Kandanos
- Karanos
- Kares, Apokoronas
- Kares, Platanias
- Kastellos
- Kefalas
- Kefali
- Kissamos
- Kokkino Chorio
- Kolymvari
- Kontomari
- Kontopoula
- Koufos
- Koukounara
- Koulkouthiana
- Kounoupidiana
- Kournas
- Kyparissos
- Lakkoi
- Lousakies
- Machairoi
- Malathyros
- Malaxa
- Maleme
- Manoliopoulo
- Maza
- Melidoni
- Meskla
- Modi
- Mournies
- Mouzouras
- Neo Chorio, Apokoronas
- Neo Chorio, Platanias
- Neriana
- Nerokouros
- Nipos
- Nochia
- Ntere
- Omalos
- Orthouni
- Paidochori
- Palaia Roumata
- Palaiochora
- Panethimos
- Pappadiana
- Patsianos
- Pemonia
- Perivolia, Kissamos
- Perivolia, Theriso
- Pervolakia
- Plaka
- Platanias
- Platanos
- Platyvola
- Plemeniana
- Polemarchi
- Polyrrinia
- Potamida
- Prases
- Psathogiannos
- Ramni
- Ravdoucha
- Rodopos
- Rodovani
- Rokka
- Sarakina
- Sasalos
- Sellia
- Sempronas
- Sfakopigadi
- Sirikari
- Sirili
- Skafi
- Skaloti
- Skines
- Sklavopoula
- Souda
- Sougia
- Spilia
- Stalos
- Sternes
- Strovles
- Stylos
- Tavronitis
- Temenia
- Theriso
- Topolia
- Tsikalaria
- Tzitzifes
- Vafes
- Vamos
- Vamvakopoulo
- Varypetro
- Vasilopoulo
- Vathi
- Vatolakkos
- Vlacheronitissa
- Vlatos
- Vothiana
- Voukolies
- Voulgaro
- Voutas
- Vouves
- Vryses
- Vryses
- Xamoudochori
- Xirosterni
- Zounaki
- Zympragou

== By municipality ==
Gavdos

== See also ==
- List of towns and villages in Greece
