= Zympragos =

Zympragos Ζυμπραγός
- Community
- Location within Greece
- Coordinates: 35°26′N 23°45′E
- Country: Greece
- Administrative region: Crete
- Regional unit: Chania
- Municipality: Platanias
- Municipal unit: Kolymvari

Population (2021)
  - Community: 78
- Time zone: UTC+2 (EET)
  - Summer (DST): UTC+3 (EEST)

Zympragos (Greek: Ζυμπραγός) is a village in Chania regional unit of the island of Crete, Greece. It was part of the former Kissamos Province and belongs to the municipality of Platanias. It has 78 residents (2021 census).

The village is located at an elevation of about 350 meters above sea level. It lies in an agricultural region with significant production of olive oil. It is 35 km southwest of Chania. The biggest church of the village is the church of Saint George.

The village is about 3 km south of the town of Voukolies. Other neighboring villages are: Dromonero, Anoskeli, Fotakado and Palaia Roumata.

== See also ==
- List of communities of Chania
