= Mousouroi =

Mousouroi Μουσούροι
- Municipal unit
- Location within the regional unit

- Location within Greece
- Coordinates: 35°27′N 23°55′E
- Country: Greece
- Administrative region: Crete
- Regional unit: Chania
- Municipality: Platanias

Area
  - Municipal unit: 191.744 km^{2} (74.033 sq mi)

Population (2021)
  - Municipal unit: 3,618
  - Municipal unit density: 18.87/km^{2} (48.87/sq mi)
- Time zone: UTC+2 (EET)
  - Summer (DST): UTC+3 (EEST)
- Postal code: 730 05
- Area code: 28210
- Vehicle registration: ΧΝ, XB
- Website: Mousouroi Website

Mousouroi (Greek: Μουσούροι, Δήμος Μουσούρων), is a former municipality in the Chania regional unit, Crete, Greece. Since the 2011 local government reform it is part of the municipality Platanias, of which it is a municipal unit. The municipal unit has an area of 191.744 km^{2} (74.033 sq mi). The municipality is named after the medieval noble Mousouros family that existed in the area.

It was part of the former Kydonia Province. The municipal unit extends from the hinterland of the town of Chania to the mountains of south Crete. Many tourists pass through Mousouroi on their way to Omalos and the start of the Samaria Gorge walk, which is in Mousouroi. Mousouroi is bordered by Voukolies in the southwest, Platanias in the northwest, Theriso to the east and East Selino in the southwest with Sfakia in the southeast.

The municipal unit includes the following communities:

Community	Population (2021)	Area
Alikianos	866	5.302
Fournes	452	9.804
Karanos	102	5.777
Koufos	153	3.369
Lakkoi	219	55.573
Meskla	268	22.435
Orthouni	65	20.634
Prases	110	27.511
Sempronas	68	14.331
Skines	563	8.228
Psathogiannos	105	3.599
Vatolakkos	647	15.181

== See also ==
- List of communities of Chania
