= Artemis (island) =

Island in Greece

Native name: Άρτεμις
- Interactive map of Artemis

Geography
- Coordinates: 35°16′00″N 23°32′21″E
- Archipelago: Cretan Islands

Administration
- Greece
- Region: Crete
- Regional unit: Chania

Demographics
- Population: 0 (2001)

Artemis (Greek: Άρτεμις), also called Prasonisi (Greek: Πρασονήσι, "leek island"), is a small uninhabited islet close to the southern coast of Crete in the Libyan Sea. It is located south-east of Elafonisi. Administratively, it is within the municipality of Innachori, in Chania regional unit.

== See also ==
- List of islands of Greece
