= Nea Kydonia =

Nea Kydonia Νέα Κυδωνία
- Municipal unit
- Location within the regional unit

- Location within Greece
- Coordinates: 35°30′N 23°57′E
- Country: Greece
- Administrative region: Crete
- Regional unit: Chania
- Municipality: Chania

Area
  - Municipal unit: 21.5 km^{2} (8.3 sq mi)

Population (2021)
  - Municipal unit: 11,597
  - Municipal unit density: 539/km^{2} (1,400/sq mi)
- Time zone: UTC+2 (EET)
  - Summer (DST): UTC+3 (EEST)
- Postal code: 731 00
- Area code: 28210
- Vehicle registration: ΧΝ, XB
- Website: www.nea-kydonia.gr

Nea Kydonia (Greek: Νέα Κυδωνία) is a former municipality in the Chania regional unit, Crete, Greece. Since the 2011 local government reform it is part of the municipality Chania, of which it is a municipal unit. The municipal unit has an area of 21.457 km^{2} (8.285 sq mi). It is situated on the western outskirts of Chania. It saw fierce fighting during the Battle of Crete during World War II and there the main prisoner of war camp for Allied soldiers in Western Crete was in Galatas.

The seat of the municipality of Nea Kydonia was in the village of Daratsos. Galatas has a popular beach at Kalamaki and a port called Kato Galatas. Agia Marina, Stalos and Daratso are other principal settlements of the municipality, as well as the uninhabited island of Agii Theodori. It was part of the former province of Kydonia.

== Ancient history ==
Nearby in the modern city of Chania, is the ancient city of Kydonia, over whose ruins the modern city has been built. Kydonia was a powerful Cretan city in the period 600 to 200 BC.

== See also ==
- List of settlements in the Chania regional unit
- Chania Plain
