= Omalos =

Omalos Ομαλός
- Settlement
- Location within Greece
- Coordinates: 35°20′N 23°54′E
- Country: Greece
- Administrative region: Crete
- Regional unit: Chania
- Municipality: Platanias
- Municipal unit: Mousouroi
- Community: Lakkoi

Area
  - Total: 15 km^{2} (5.8 sq mi)
- Elevation: 1,041 m (3,415 ft)

Population (2021)
  - Total: 22
  - Density: 1.5/km^{2} (3.8/sq mi)
- Time zone: UTC+2 (EET)
  - Summer (DST): UTC+3 (EEST)
- Postal code: 73005
- Area code: +30 28210

Omalos (Greek: Ομαλός) is a small village in western Crete, in the Mousouroi unit of the Chania region. The Greek word Ομαλός means even, plain, regular, or smooth, referring to the plateau.

== Description ==
Omalos is situated at the northeastern corner of the Omalos Plateau (οροπέδιο του Ομαλού), 38 km south of Chania in the White Mountains (Lefka Ori). The plateau has an area of 15 km^{2}, and lies on the intersection of three districts, namely the Mousouroi unit of Platanias (previously Kydonia), Sfakia and East Selino. Although the settlement is in Mousouroi, most of the plateau lies in East Selino.

The plateau has three approaches, from the west, from the Chania-Sougia road, from the north at Omalos and from the south where one descends through the Samariá Gorge to the coast at Agia Roumeli on the Libyan Sea. Omalos itself is about 5 km from the entrance to the gorge at Xyloskalo, and derives most of its importance from its association with trekking. An old stone mule track connects Omalos with Agia Eirini to the west, from whence access to the next gorge to the west, the Agia Eirini Gorge is made.

The cooler climate and fertile soil lends itself to growing vegetables and fruit such as potatoes and apples, together with cereals. Small round stone houses (mitata) are used for making local cheese (graviera). In the warmer seasons shepherds bring their flocks onto pastures (madares, μαδάρες) on the slopes of the Lefka Ori.

== Geography ==
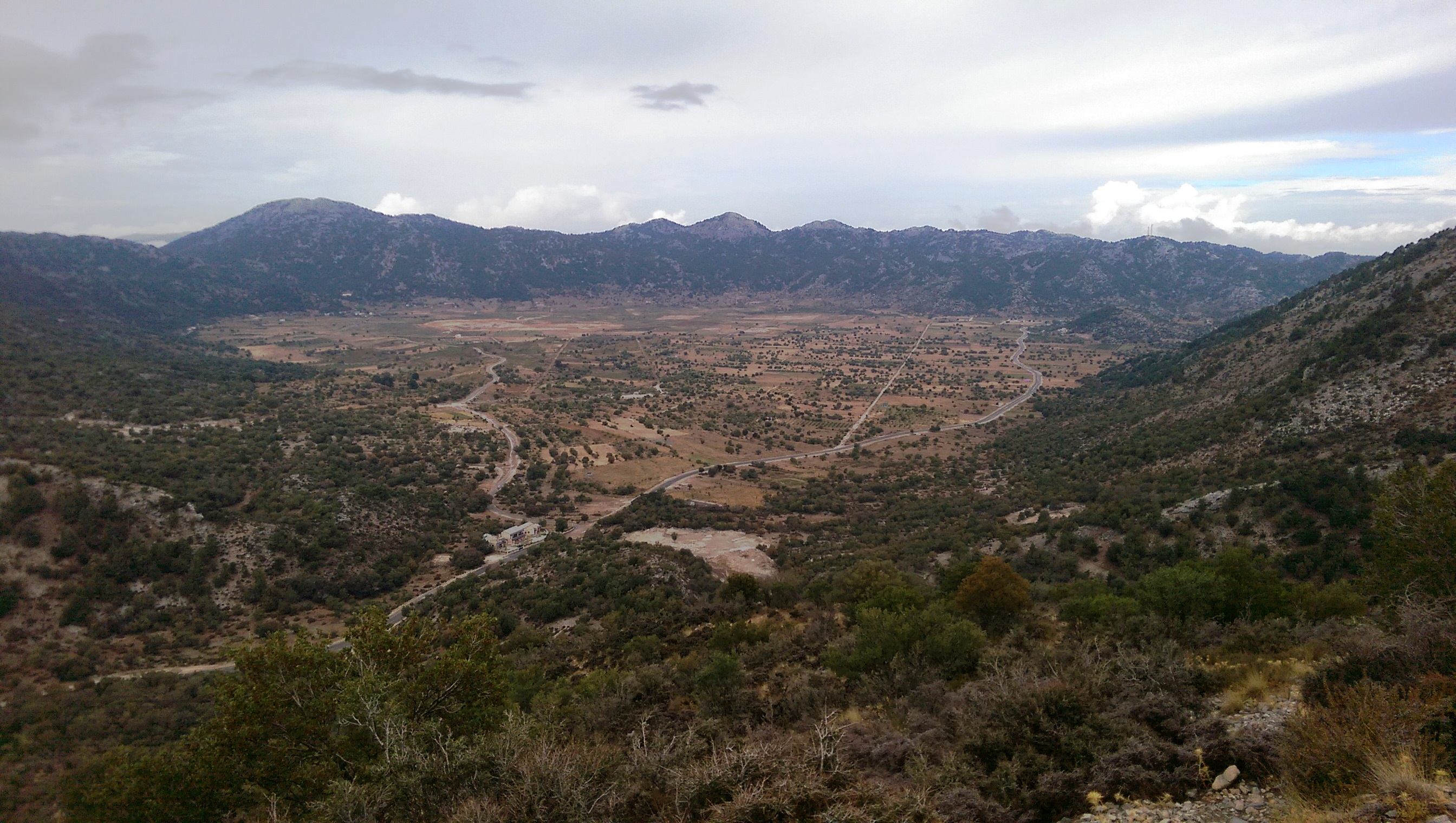
Omalos plateau

Originally a lake, it is thought to have lost its waters through the Tzani Cave. The cave is found to the right of the winding road from Omalos, descending towards Chania, about 1.6 km from Omalos.

At Xyloskalo (1250m), two peaks rise - Gingilos (2080m) and Volakias (2116m), which legend associates with the throne of Zeus, who was born in Crete. Further west are Agathopi (1768m) and Psilafi (1984m), supposedly Zeus' racing grounds, but now slalom ski racing.

== History ==
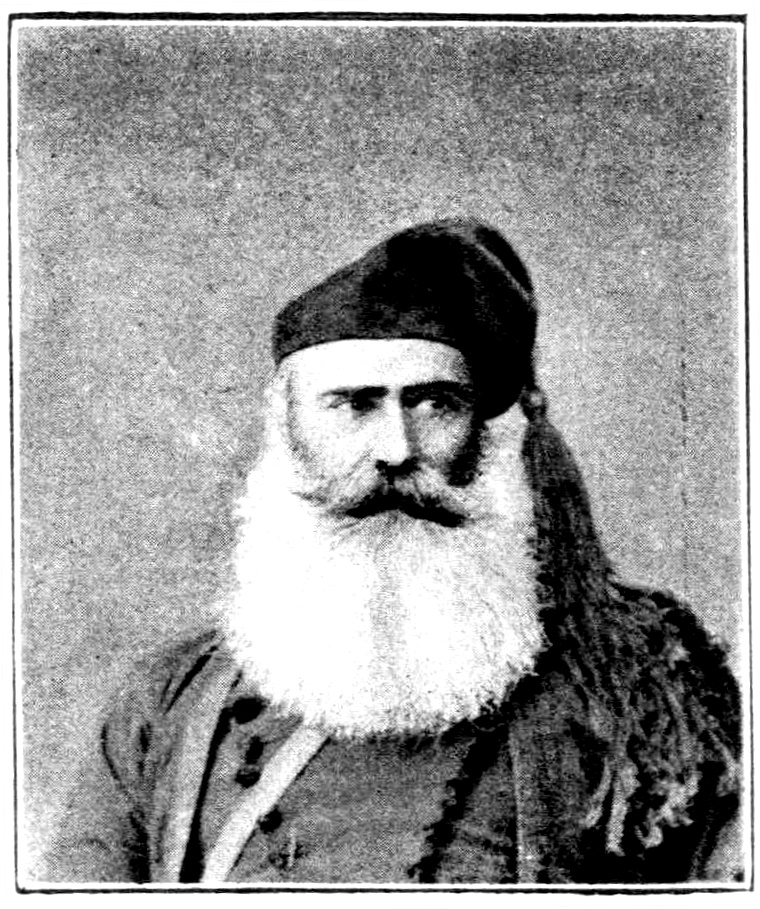
Hatzimihalis Yiannaris 1833-1916,. Photo dated 1890

During the uprisings against the Ottoman Empire. the Turks rarely managed to penetrate the plateau. The name Omalos is said to have derived from a revolutionary song "Πότε θα κάνει ξαστεριά πότε θα Φλεβαρίσει να πάρω το τουφέκι μου...να κατεβώ στον Ομαλό"

The Tzani cave is named after Tzanis Markos a revolutionary chieftain in the early years of the Turkish invasion who made it his lair. He was nicknamed "Fobos" (fear). The cave is about 2.5 km long, and descends 241 metres. It is actually a covered gorge.

The Cretan revolutionary Hatzimichalis Giannaris (1833-1916) was born in nearby Lakkoi, and was prominent in the 1855-1869 conflicts, captured but escaped from prison in Chania and then exiled to Odessa. In 1912 he was elected to the Greek parliament. Although he died in Chania his wish was to be buried in Omalos, where by the Tzani cave stands a church dedicated to him.

During World War II the plateau was used as an airfield.
