= Stalos =

Town in Greece

Stalos Σταλός
- Community
- Location within Greece
- Coordinates: 35°30′N 23°56′E
- Country: Greece
- Administrative region: Crete
- Regional unit: Chania
- Municipality: Chania
- Municipal unit: Nea Kydonia

Population (2021)
  - Community: 931
- Time zone: UTC+2 (EET)
  - Summer (DST): UTC+3 (EEST)

Stalos is a town on the island of Crete in Greece. It had a population of 931 (2021) and since the local government reform it is part of the municipality Chania. It is 8 km west from the city of Chania and the nearby beach at Kato Stalos is a popular resort in summer that forms a continuous strip with nearby Agia Marina and Platanias.
