= Stylos =

Village in Greece

Stylos Στύλος
- Community
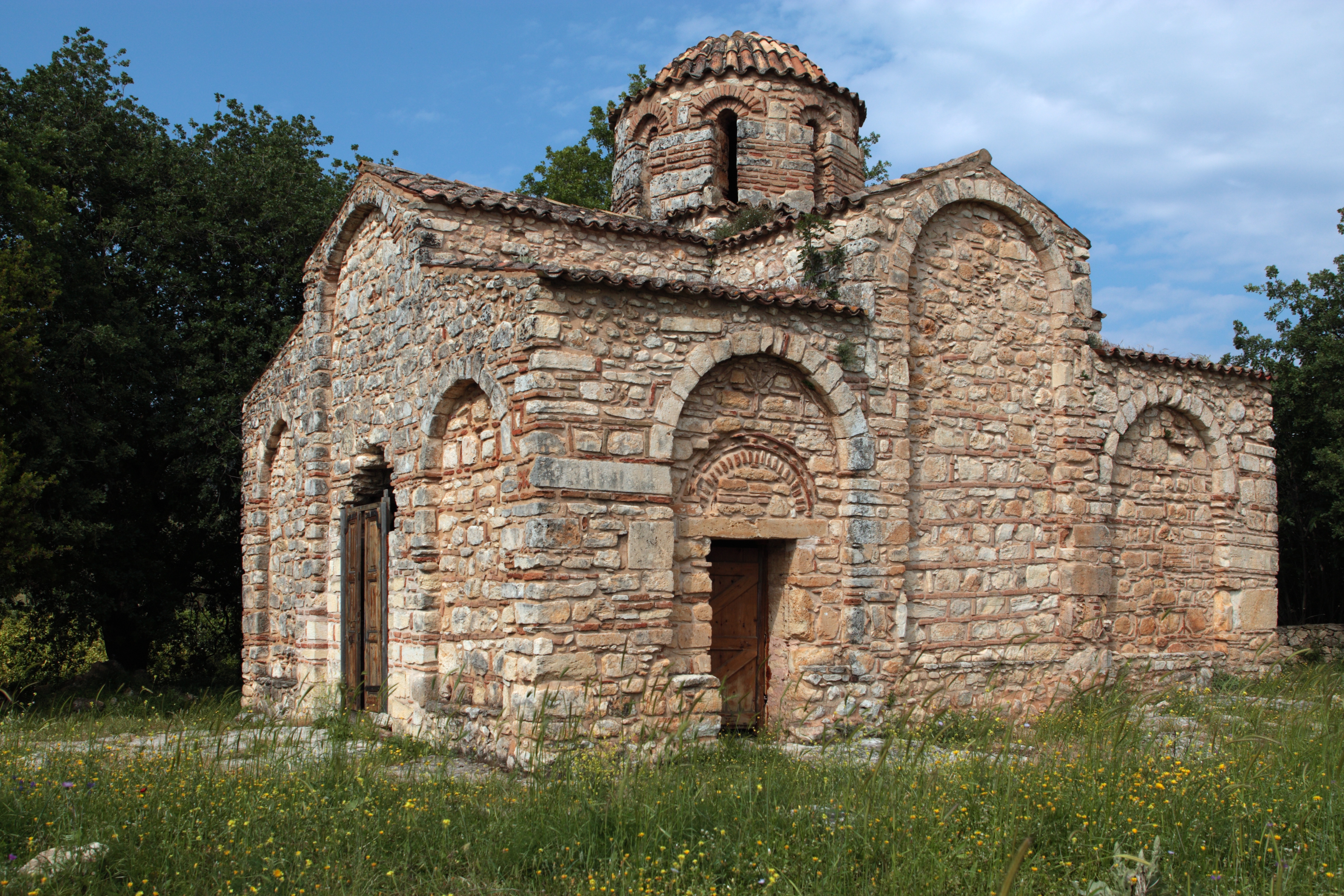
- The church of the Panagia Serviotissa

- Location within Greece
- Coordinates: 35°26′55″N 24°7′49″E
- Country: Greece
- Administrative region: Crete
- Regional unit: Chania
- Municipality: Apokoronas
- Municipal unit: Armenoi

Population (2021)
  - Community: 448
- Time zone: UTC+2 (EET)
  - Summer (DST): UTC+3 (EEST)

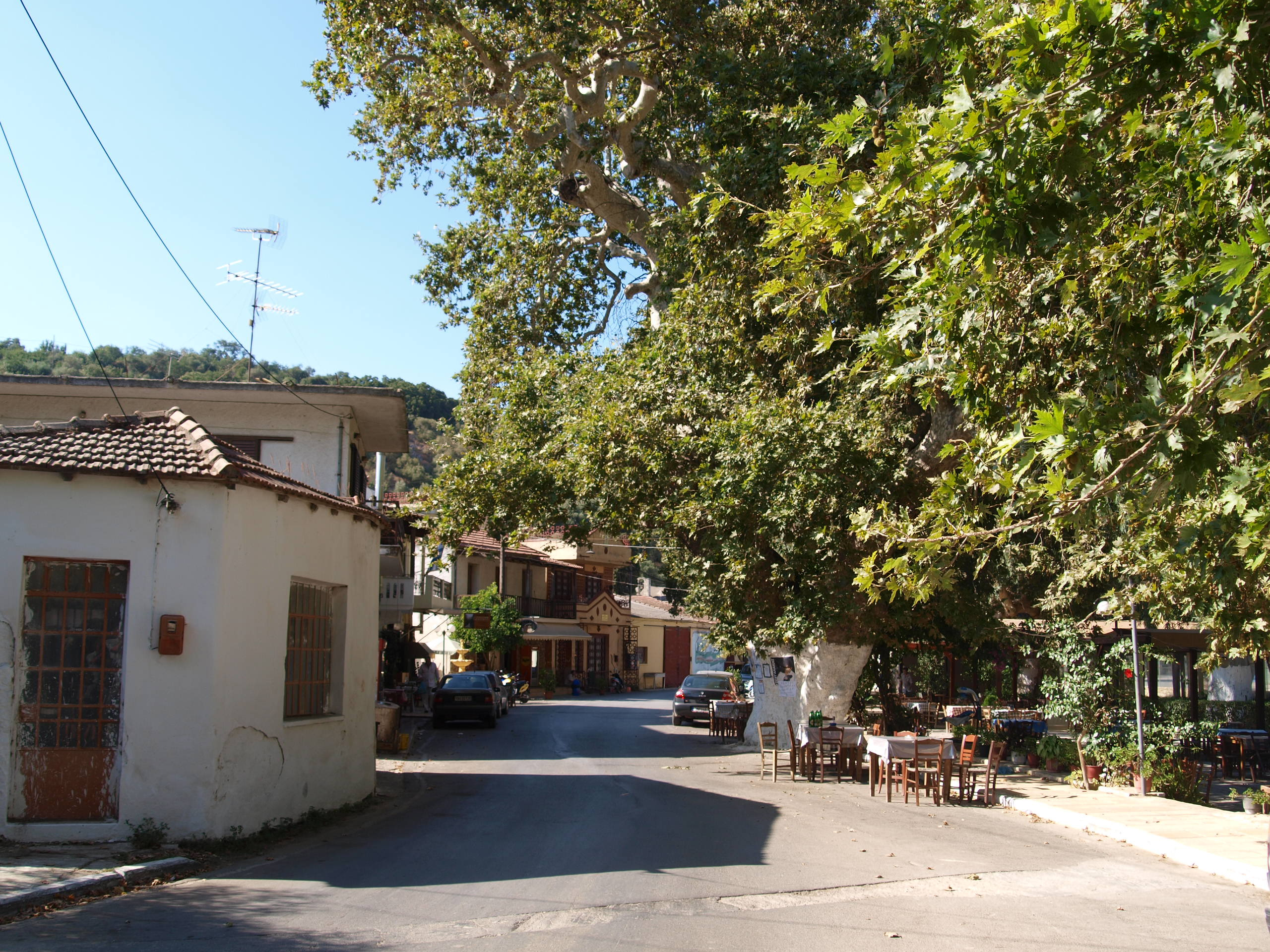
The village in summer.

Stylos or Stilos (Greek: Στύλος) is a village and part of the Apokoronas municipal unit in the Chania regional unit of the Greek island of Crete. The Greek etymology of the name of the village is 'column' or 'pillar'. No existing topographical or surviving architectural feature could account for this naming.

In the Minoan time a large and important Minoan settlement (mentioned in Linear B as a-pa-ta-wa) was located here. When it declined, its name was given to the city of Aptera that was built approximately 1.5 km away from Stylos.

The village is laid out to the south side of the road from Megala Chorafia to Neo Chorio. The two-aisled Byzantine Church of St. John the Theologian stands by the village road, as does a modern domed church. Next to the Church of St. John, the fossilized remains of the extinct Sirenia sea mammal Metaxytherium medium, can be seen.

The Etanap (Greek ΕΤΑΝΑΠ Α.Ε. - Επιτραπέζιο Νερό ΣΑΜΑΡΙΑ) bottling plant in the village provides mineral water under the Samaria brand.

On 26 and 27 May 1941, during the Battle of Crete, Stylos was the site of a battle between the New Zealand and Australian rear guard forces and the Austrian 85th Mountain Regiment that successfully delayed the Nazi invaders' pursuit of the Allied retreat to Sfakia. Allied troops that were left behind after the evacuation were subsequently sheltered by locals at great risk of Nazi reprisal. A number of steel helmets from the period hang on the wall of the old village shop.

The land to the north between Stylos and Megala Chorafia is believed to be an important Minoan site, possibly associated with Aptera, or maybe ancient Aptera itself. No systematic excavations have been done but two kilometres north-west of the village at Sternaki there is an excavated Minoan settlement which includes a potter's kiln, a four-roomed building and a Late Minoan tholos tomb with a long road.

Closer to the village, to the north east of the road to Megala Chorafia, the church of Panagia Serviotissa in the monastery of Agios Ioannis can be seen in the middle of the orange groves. The church can be reached by a narrow track. The church is one of the best examples of Byzantine architecture in Crete. It was built in the middle of the second Byzantine period, the twelfth century, and shows influences of previously developed new forms of church architecture which originated in Constantinople. The church has a typical domed cross-in-square plan whose supporting drum is on the intersection of the two aisles. The church was restored in the early 21st century as part of a programme of church restoration throughout the regional unit.

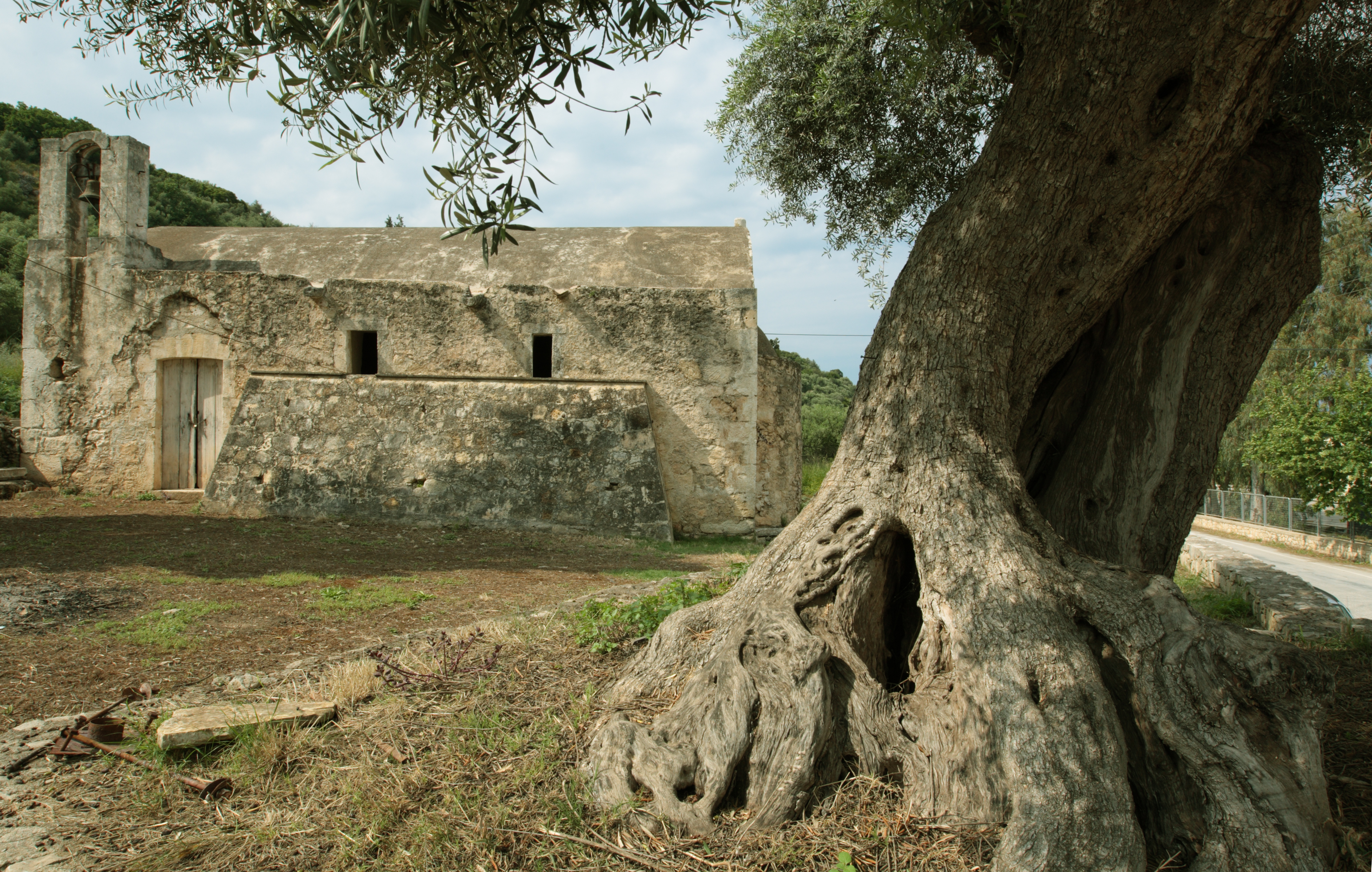
The St. John the Theologian Church in Stylos

North of the village lies the Gorge of Dyktamos, a popular hiking destination.
