= Theriso =

Theriso Θέρισο
- Municipal unit
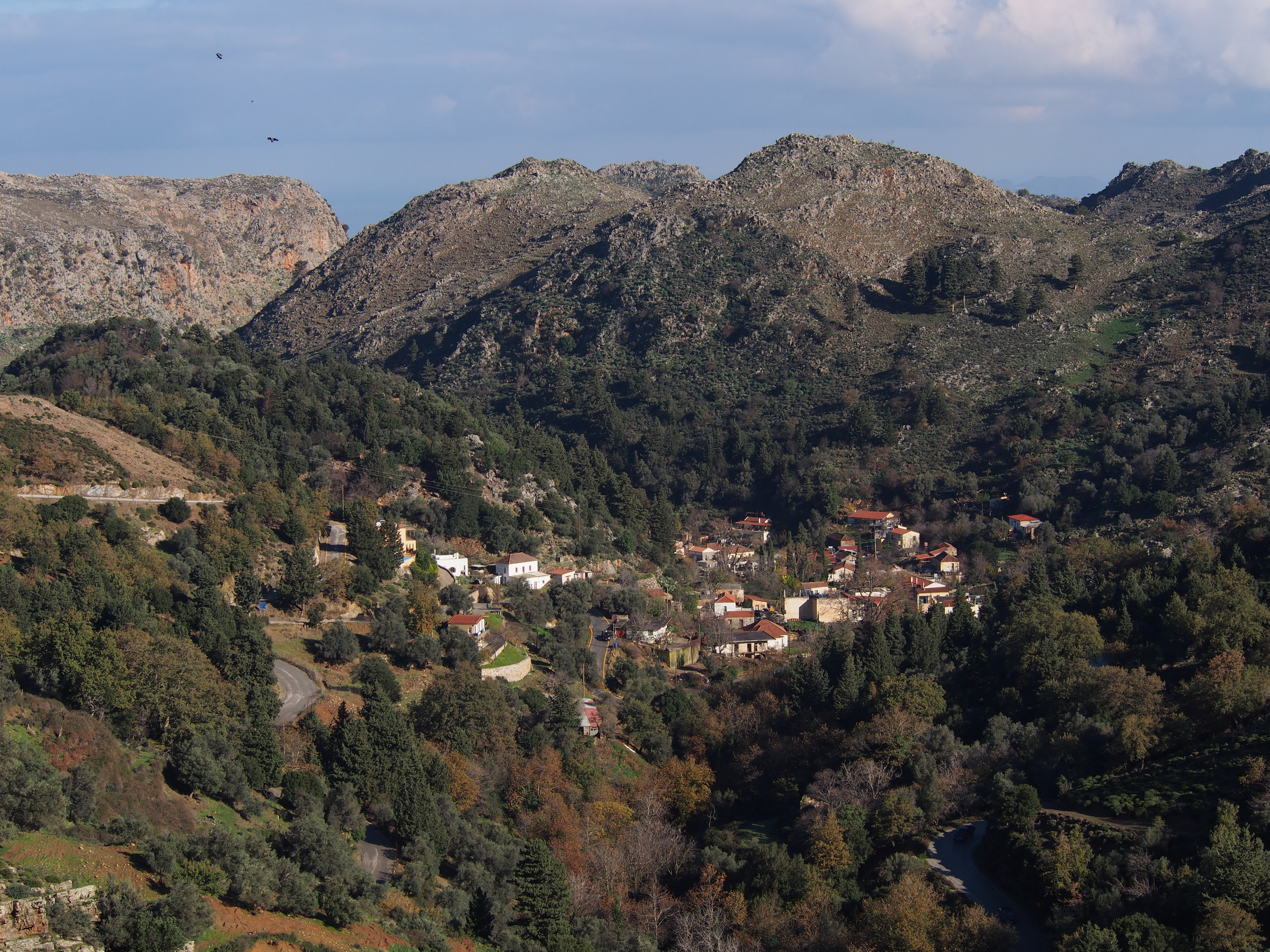
- View of Theriso

- Location within the regional unit

- Location within Greece
- Coordinates: 35°24′17″N 23°59′04″E
- Country: Greece
- Administrative region: Crete
- Regional unit: Chania
- Municipality: Chania

Area
  - Municipal unit: 74.1 km^{2} (28.6 sq mi)

Population (2021)
  - Municipal unit: 8,914
  - Municipal unit density: 120/km^{2} (312/sq mi)
  - Community: 120
- Time zone: UTC+2 (EET)
  - Summer (DST): UTC+3 (EEST)
- Postal code: 731 00
- Area code: 28210
- Vehicle registration: ΧΝ, XB
- Website: Theriso Website

Theriso (Greek: Θέρισο, Δήμος Θερίσου) is a village and former municipality in the Chania regional unit, Crete, Greece. Since the 2011 local government reform it is part of the municipality Chania, of which it is a municipal unit. The municipal unit has an area of 74.106 km^{2} (28.612 sq mi). It was part of the former Kydonia Province, which covered the central part of Chania Prefecture.

The town of Theriso is located to the south of Chania at the top of the Theriso gorge. The 14 km drive up the gorge is considered spectacular and is popular with Chania residents for the cooler temperatures and grill restaurants of the village. Theriso is a historic village and the birthplace of the mother of Eleftherios Venizelos. In 1905, Venizelos organised the Revolutionary Assembly in the village that ousted Prince George of Greece and precipitated the independence of Crete and its union with Greece (see Theriso revolt).

The municipal unit of Theriso extends from the outer suburbs of Chania, principally Perivolia and the village Agia, up the gorge beyond Theriso itself into the White Mountains (Lefka Ori). The head town of the municipality was Vamvakopoulo near Chania. The municipal unit also includes Theriso, Agia and Varipetro. It is bordered by Mousouroi to the west and Keramia to the east.

== See also ==
- List of communities of Chania
