= Malaxa =

Malaxa (Greek: Μαλάξα) may refer to:

- Malaxa, Crete, a village in the Chania regional unit on Crete, Greece
- Malaxa Mountain, a landform at Malaxa on the island of Crete, Greece
- Malaxa (car), Romanian car

== People with the surname ==
- Nicolae Malaxa (1884–1965), Romanian engineer and industrialist
