= Modi, Chania =

Modi Μόδι
- Community
- Location within Greece
- Coordinates: 35°30′07″N 23°52′44″E
- Country: Greece
- Administrative region: Crete
- Regional unit: Chania
- Municipality: Platanias
- Municipal unit: Platanias

Population (2021)
  - Community: 262
- Time zone: UTC+2 (EET)
  - Summer (DST): UTC+3 (EEST)
- Postal code: 73014

Modi is a village located on the northern shore of Western Crete, 15 kilometers north of Chania. It is part of the municipality of Platanias, and of the Chania regional unit.
