= Malaxa Mountain =

Coordinates: 35.465°N 24.072°E

Malaxa Mountain is a mountain at Malaxa on the island of Crete in the country of Greece. This mountain feature is situated in northwestern coastal Crete in the vicinity of the city of Chania. Trypali limestone is a dominant rock of Malaxa Mountain. The ancient city of Kydonia held sway over lands to the south of it across the Chania Plain all the way to Malaxa Mountain.

== See also ==
- Kastelli Hill
