= Kampoi =

Kampoi Κάμποι
- Community
- Location within Greece
- Coordinates: 35°25′5″N 24°4′10″E
- Country: Greece
- Administrative region: Crete
- Regional unit: Chania
- Municipality: Chania
- Municipal unit: Keramia

Population (2021)
  - Community: 134
- Time zone: UTC+2 (EET)
  - Summer (DST): UTC+3 (EEST)

Kampoi (Greek: Κάμποι) is a village and community in the municipal unit of Keramia, in the municipality of Chania, on the island of Crete, Greece. The Keramia area lies in the northern foothills of the White Mountains and consists of small, scattered settlements.

In the 2021 census, the village of Kampoi had 92 residents, while the wider Community of Kampoi, including Madaro and Tsakistra, had a total population of 134.

Kampoi has a documented history of involvement in the Cretan uprisings against Ottoman rule, including revolutionary activity during the 19th century. The village was also affected by the German occupation of Crete in 1944. Its surrounding mountain landscape has traditionally supported agriculture and livestock farming, and local cultural traditions include "rizitika" singing and the seasonal use of the high pastures of the White Mountains.

== Name ==
The name Kampoi (Κάμποι) is the plural of the Greek word kampos (κάμπος), meaning a plain or flat rural area. Historian Stergios Spanakis describes the village as being situated on a small plateau on the northern slopes of the White Mountains and connects this geographical setting with the place name. A local tradition recorded in a later historical account associates the founding of the settlement with two brothers of the Vlastos family. According to the tradition, one described the site he had chosen as a small plain (kampoulaki), while the other observed that the area contained several such plains, giving rise to the name Kampoi.

== Geography ==
Kampoi is situated in the northern foothills of the White Mountains, within the predominantly mountainous municipal unit of Keramia. The Municipality of Chania describes much of Keramia as mountainous terrain characterized by limestone landforms.

The village lies at an elevation of approximately 560 metres above sea level. A meteorological station operated by the National Observatory of Athens and hosted at the Cultural Center of Kampoi Keramia is located in the village at this elevation.

=== Weather and climate ===
The weather of Kampoi is influenced by its elevation and its position on the northern side of the White Mountains. Crete has substantial local variation in precipitation because of its mountainous topography, with the White Mountains receiving some of the highest precipitation totals on the island.

Local weather can change rapidly under strong downslope winds. The National Observatory of Athens has cited measurements from the Kampoi weather station during a foehn-wind event on 17 April 2021, when changes in wind direction were accompanied by temperature rises and falls of as much as 13 °C within a short period. The station also records episodes of heavy mountain rainfall; during 24–26 April 2026, rainfall totals exceeded 130 mm at Kampoi and several other stations in the Chania regional unit.

== Demographics ==
In the 2011 census, the Community of Kampoi had a permanent population of 92, comprising 57 residents in Kampoi, 15 in Madaro and 20 in Tsakistra. By the 2021 census, the community’s population had increased to 134, with 92 residents in Kampoi, 12 in Madaro and 30 in Tsakistra.

=== Population history ===
Historical census records show a substantial decline in the population of Kampoi village during the second half of the 20th century, followed by an increase between 2011 and 2021. The figures below refer to the settlement of Kampoi itself rather than the wider community, whose composition changed over time.

Population of Kampoi
Census year	Population
1951	340
1961	230
1971	174
1981	167
1991	179
2001	127
2011	57
2021	92

== Administrative history ==
The Community of Kampoi was established in 1925 with Kampoi as its administrative seat. It originally included Kampoi, Katochori, Tsakistra and Madaro; Katochori was transferred to the Community of Kontopoula later that year. In 1951, the settlement of Gero Prinos (Greek: Γέρω Πρίνος), now written Geroprinos (Greek: Γερωπρίνος), was officially recognized and attached to the Community of Kampoi. In 1996, Kampoi, Madaro, Tsakistra and Gero Prinos were incorporated into the Municipality of Keramia, and the former community was abolished. Gero Prinos ceased to be recognized as a separate administrative settlement in 2001.

The Municipality of Chania continues to publish a separate settlement-boundary map for Geroprinos, alongside maps for Kampoi, Madaro and Tsakistra.

Under the 2010 Kallikratis local-government reform, the Municipality of Keramia was incorporated into the enlarged Municipality of Chania. From 2011, Kampoi became part of the municipal unit of Keramia within the Municipality of Chania.

== History ==
Kampoi is recorded in written sources from the period of Venetian rule in Crete. Francesco Barozzi listed the settlement as Cabus in 1577 in the province of Kydonia. In 1583, records compiled by Kastrofylakas used the forms Cabus or Cambus, while Francesco Basilicata recorded the settlement as Cambus in 1630. Kampoi also appears in the Egyptian census of Crete in 1834, although no population figure was recorded for the settlement.

During the 19th century, Kampoi was associated with several of the Cretan uprisings against Ottoman rule. Among the revolutionaries connected with the village was Ioannis Moutsakis, a hainis and revolutionary who was active in Crete and Samos and was killed at Gramvousa in 1827.

During the Cretan Revolt of 1866–1869, Kampoi again served as a meeting place for revolutionary activity. On 14 September 1866, a revolutionary committee meeting at Kampoi sent a report to King George I in which it rejected Ottoman sovereignty over Crete and declared its support for union with Greece. A local historical account states that Kampoi was burned during the 1866 uprising and that Ottoman forces occupied the village in 1868, constructing a military barracks above it; the barracks was later destroyed by revolutionaries during the uprising of 1878.

Kampoi also played a documented role during the Cretan uprising of 1895–1896. A published account records fighting at Kampoi during the 1895 uprising and states that, after the revolutionary movement spread across Crete, elections for the presidium of the General Revolutionary Assembly of the Cretans were scheduled to take place at Kampoi on 18 August 1896. An archival photograph dated to 1896 and held by the Eleftherios K. Venizelos National Research Foundation depicts a group of revolutionaries under Ioannis Kalogeris at Kampoi.

=== German occupation ===
During the German occupation of Crete, Kampoi was the site of arrests and killings in 1944. On the night of 7–8 May, German forces entered and surrounded the village. During a clash, resident Vasilis Pontikakis was killed, and German troops rounded up men from Kampoi and took them into custody. The events were documented shortly afterward by Petros Papoutsakis, the parish priest of Kampoi, in the 1945 publication Τα μαρτύρια των Καμπιανών υπό των Γερμανών επί Κατοχής (The sufferings of the people of Kampoi under the Germans during the Occupation), which records events in the village in May and November 1944.

A number of prisoners from Kampoi were subsequently transported by the German occupation authorities and placed aboard the Tanais. A later historical account in Haniotika Nea identifies 24 residents of Kampoi among those who died when the ship was sunk in June 1944. On 12 November 1944, Kampoi was also part of the front of the ELAS forces during the Battle of Keramia. A military order dated 14 November and reproduced in a later historical account described a German attack against the 14th Regiment of ELAS extending from Kampoi to Kleftoperama, followed by day-long fighting in which the defending forces retained their positions.

== Landmarks ==
The central square of Kampoi is named for Georgios Papoutsakis, a military officer from the village associated in local historical accounts with the Balkan Wars and the Asia Minor campaign. The square contains a memorial honoring local fighters and fallen residents associated with Greek national liberation struggles. The original monument was unveiled on 10 June 1973. In 1988, the Kampoi Development Association and the local community replaced the earlier monument with a new memorial formed from three large rocks, incorporating a winged Glory plaque from the previous monument. The memorial records names connected with several periods of Greek and Cretan history, including the Cretan uprisings against Ottoman rule, the Balkan Wars, the Asia Minor campaign, the German occupation and the Greek Civil War.

=== Churches ===
The parish serving Kampoi and Madaro is listed by the Holy Metropolis of Kydonia and Apokoronas as the Church of Saint John the Theologian (Greek: Ιερός Ναός Αγίου Ιωάννου του Θεολόγου Κάμπων-Μαδαρού Κυδωνίας).

At Kampoi, a two-aisled church dedicated to Saint John the Theologian and the Dormition of the Theotokos was built in 1636, according to a historical survey published by the Holy Metropolis.

The feast of Saint John the Theologian is observed at Kampoi on 8 May. The Metropolis has documented a Divine Liturgy there followed by a memorial service in the central square for the victims of May 1944 and other local fighters.

The same ecclesiastical historical survey lists the churches of Saint Gerasimos and Saint Paraskevi at Kampoi among churches dating to the 19th century. A local historical account records that the Church of Saint Gerasimos was renovated in 1905 and again in 1976.

== Culture and traditions ==
Rizitika singing remains part of the cultural life of Kampoi. The Cultural Association of Kampoi Keramia maintains a traditional singing group that participates in village commemorations and cultural events. The Municipality of Chania has included a rizitiko performance by the association in the annual commemoration for the victims of 8 May 1944 held in the central square of Kampoi. In 2019, the Cultural Association marked ten years of activity with a village festival at which association members performed traditional dances and sang rizitika.

The local song tradition has also been recorded in print. In 2009, Eleftheria Athousaki published Ριζίτικοι παλμοί της Μαδάρας: ριζίτικα, ρίμες, δίστιχα (Rizitika rhythms of the Madara: rizitika, rhymes and couplets), a collection whose subtitle identifies its material as songs in the old idiom of Kampoi Keramia following the Second World War.

== Economy and agriculture ==
Kampoi forms part of the predominantly rural municipal unit of Keramia, where primary-sector activity remains an important part of the local economy. The Municipality of Chania identifies agriculture and livestock farming as characteristic activities of the area and lists olive oil and wine among its notable products.

A municipal strategic plan for 2014–2019 described livestock farming and agriculture as the principal primary-sector activities in Keramia, with limited processing including wine bottling. The same plan also noted the development of beekeeping and horticultural cultivation in the area.

== Natural environment and trails ==
Kampoi provides access to mountain routes in the northern foothills of the White Mountains. The Municipality of Chania has included the routes from Kampoi to the Volika mountain refuge and Mile, and from Psychro Pigadi to Chalase, in projects for the development and marking of hiking trails in the Keramia area.

=== Volika refuge ===
The Volika mountain refuge is located in the White Mountains above Kampoi. It was built in 1958 by the Chania Mountaineering Club and is one of the oldest mountain refuges on Crete. The club lists the refuge at an elevation of about 1,400 metres and describes the traditional route from Kampoi as an uphill hike of approximately three hours.

The construction of the refuge was supported by the Community of Kampoi and residents of the surrounding area. At the time, there was no road to the building site, and construction materials were transported by pack animals from Katochori. The old mountain path from Kampoi toward Volika was also associated with the transport of natural ice from the high White Mountains to Chania before mechanical refrigeration; ice was carried down from mountain sinkholes by pack animals.

=== Pastoral heritage ===
The mountain area above Kampoi also preserves traces of the community's traditional pastoral life. Ampelia (Greek: Αμπέλια), at an elevation of about 1,230 metres, is described in local accounts as an old pastoral settlement. The surrounding area contains remains of traditional shepherd shelters known as mitata, associated with the seasonal use of the high mountain pastures.

A stone chapel dedicated to the Prophet Elijah was built at Ampelia by the Traditional Cultural Association of Kampoi and the local community. The feast at the chapel includes traditional ''rizitika'' singing, local wine and traditional food.

=== Psychro Pigadi ===
Psychro Pigadi (Greek: Ψυχρό Πηγάδι) is a mountain area approximately 8 km from Kampoi, reached by a paved road and characterized by cypress woodland and a source of cold water. In 2023, the Municipality of Chania established an astronomy walking trail in the area, with access points at Drakona and Psychro Pigadi and designated locations for observing the night sky.
