= Gerani =

Gerani may refer to:

- Gerani, Cyprus, village in Northern Cyprus
- Gerani, Chania, village in the municipality of Platanias, Crete, Greece
- Gerani, Rethymno, village in the municipality of Rethymno, Crete, Greece
