= Agioi Apostoloi, Chania =

Beach on Crete, Greece

Agioi Apostoloi is a beach in village of Chania in the municipal unit in South Greece, West side of Crete Island, Greece. That is located near on the seaside of Crete island.

It is actually formed from three connected coves and is very popular with Greeks and tourists alike.

== See also ==
- Chania
- List of settlements in the Chania regional unit
