= Pappadiana =

Community in Greece

Pappadiana Παππαδιανά
- Community
- Location within Greece
- Coordinates: 35°26′N 24°2′E
- Country: Greece
- Administrative region: Crete
- Regional unit: Chania
- Municipality: Chania
- Municipal unit: Keramia

Population (2021)
  - Community: 170
- Time zone: UTC+2 (EET)
  - Summer (DST): UTC+3 (EEST)

Pappadiana (Greek: Παππαδιανά) is a community in the municipal unit of Keramia, Chania regional unit on the island of Crete, Greece. It has 170 residents (2021 census), and consists of the villages Achlades, Gerolakkos, Loulos and Panagia.
