= Inachori =

Inachori Ιναχώρι
- Municipal unit
- Location within the regional unit

- Location within Greece
- Coordinates: 35°22′N 23°36′E
- Country: Greece
- Administrative region: Crete
- Regional unit: Chania
- Municipality: Kissamos

Area
  - Municipal unit: 136.7 km^{2} (52.8 sq mi)

Population (2021)
  - Municipal unit: 908
  - Municipal unit density: 6.64/km^{2} (17.2/sq mi)
- Time zone: UTC+2 (EET)
  - Summer (DST): UTC+3 (EEST)
- Postal code: 730 12
- Area code: 28220
- Vehicle registration: ΧΝ

Inachori (Greek: Ιναχώρι, before 2006: Ινναχώρι - Innachori) is a group of villages and a former municipality in the Chania regional unit, Crete, Greece. Since the 2011 local government reform, it is part of the municipality Kissamos, of which it is a municipal unit. The municipal unit has an area of 136.716 km^{2} (52.786 sq mi). The name means 'nine villages'. It is a shady, hilly area in the southwest of the island.

Inachori is rugged and remote and known for its chestnuts. It is increasingly popular with tourists, particularly the white sand beach and warm shallow waters at Elafonisi.

The seat of the municipality was Elos. Settlements of Inachori include:

- Elos
- Perivolia
- Kefali
- Vathi
- Kampos
- Strovles
- Vlatos
- Amygdalokefali
- Chrysoskalitissa

== See also ==
- List of settlements in the Chania regional unit
