= Spilia Museum of Kissamos =

Crete museum

Coordinates: 35.4956°N 23.6544°E

Spilia Museum of Kissamos is a museum in Kissamos, Crete, Greece.
