= Meskla =

Meskla Μεσκλά
- Community
- Location within Greece
- Coordinates: 35°24′13″N 23°57′22″E
- Country: Greece
- Administrative region: Crete
- Regional unit: Chania
- Municipality: Platanias
- Municipal unit: Mousouroi

Population (2021)
  - Community: 268
- Time zone: UTC+2 (EET)
  - Summer (DST): UTC+3 (EEST)

Meskla (Μεσκλά) is a village in the municipality of Platanias, a regional unit of Chania, western Crete, in Greece. According to the 2021 census it has 268 inhabitants. It is built on an altitude of 200 meters, at the northern foothills of the White Mountains, in the valley of the river Keritis. It is 21 km away from the city of Chania and 4 km from the village of Fournes. In the past it was a community of the province of Kydonia which included, besides Meskla, the village of Zourva.

== Population ==
Census	1900	1920	1928	1940	1951	1961	1971	1981	1991	2001	2011	2021
Population	617	569	619	826	628	704	600	540	527	425	333	268
