= Katonisi =

Greek island in the Libyan Sea

Native name: Κατονήσι
- Interactive map of Katonisi

Geography
- Coordinates: 35°10′40″N 24°14′07″E
- Archipelago: Cretan Islands

Administration
- Greece
- Region: Crete
- Regional unit: Chania

Demographics
- Population: 0 (2001)

Katonisi (Greek: Κατονήσι, "lower island") is an uninhabited islet close to the southern coast of Crete in the Libyan Sea. It is administered from the municipality of Sfakia, in Chania regional unit.

== See also ==
- List of islands of Greece
