= Elafonisi =

Island in Crete, Greece

Native name: Ελαφονήσι
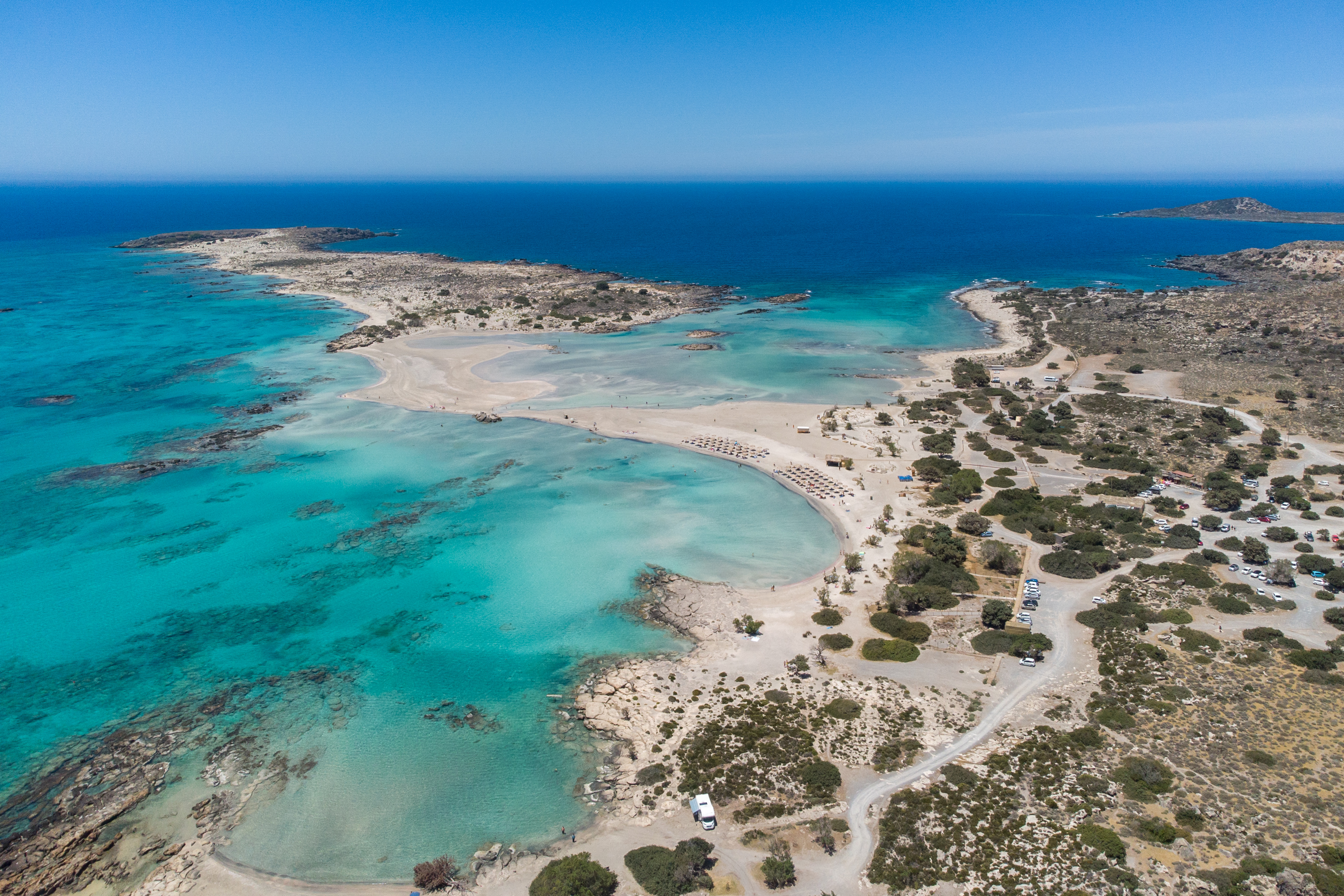
- Southeastern coast of Elafonisi

- Location within Greece

Geography
- Coordinates: 35.27°N 23.532°E
- Archipelago: Cretan Islands
- Area: 1.5 km^{2} (0.58 sq mi)

Administration
- Greece
- Region: Crete
- Regional unit: Chania
- Municipality: Kissamos

Demographics
- Population: 0 (2001)

Additional information
- Vehicle registration: ΧΝ

Elafonisi (Greek: Ελαφονήσι [elafoˈnisi], "Deer Island") is an island located close to the southwestern corner of the Mediterranean island of Crete, of which it is administratively a part, in the municipality of Kissamos of the regional unit of Chania. When the weather is fine it is possible to walk to the island through the shallow water. The island is a protected nature reserve. It is known for its pink sand beaches, created by tidal and wave-induced deposits of pigmented microorganisms living in a symbiotic relationship with native seaweed.

== Greek War of Independence ==
At the highest point on the island there is a plaque that commemorates a tragic event. On Easter Sunday of 18 April 1824 several hundred Greeks, mostly women and children, were killed on Elafonisi by Ottoman soldiers. To avoid advancing Turkish Ottoman troops, forty armed men had taken refuge on the island with women, children and old folk where they were waiting for a ship to take them to the Ionian Islands. The Ottoman soldiers had decided to camp on the beach opposite the island. One of their horses walked along the shallow water to the island and the people hiding on the island were discovered. According to several sources there were between 640 and 850 people in total, most of whom were killed and the remaining survivors were sold into slavery in Egypt.

== Shipwreck of the Imperatrix ==
A large wooden cross commemorates a shipwreck from 22 February 1907. It was an Österreichischer Lloyd passenger steamer, called the Imperatrix. Due to strong northwest winds 38 people died in a lifeboat that tried to reach the shore. They were all buried on the island. The Imperatrix still lies on the seabed in front of the island's cliffs and was the reason that a lighthouse was built on an island hilltop.

The lighthouse was destroyed during the Second World War by the occupying German troops.

== Gallery ==
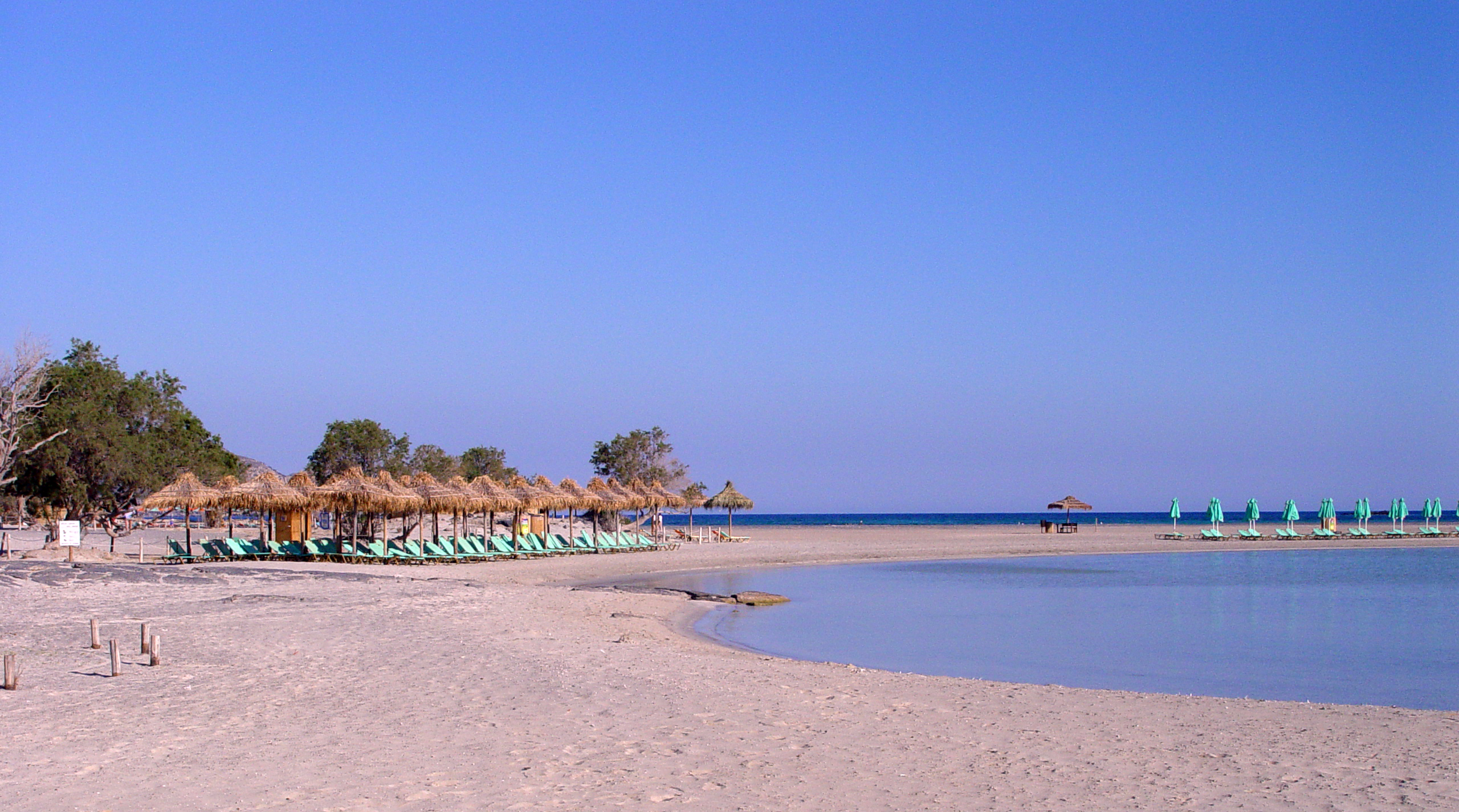
Elafonisi beach

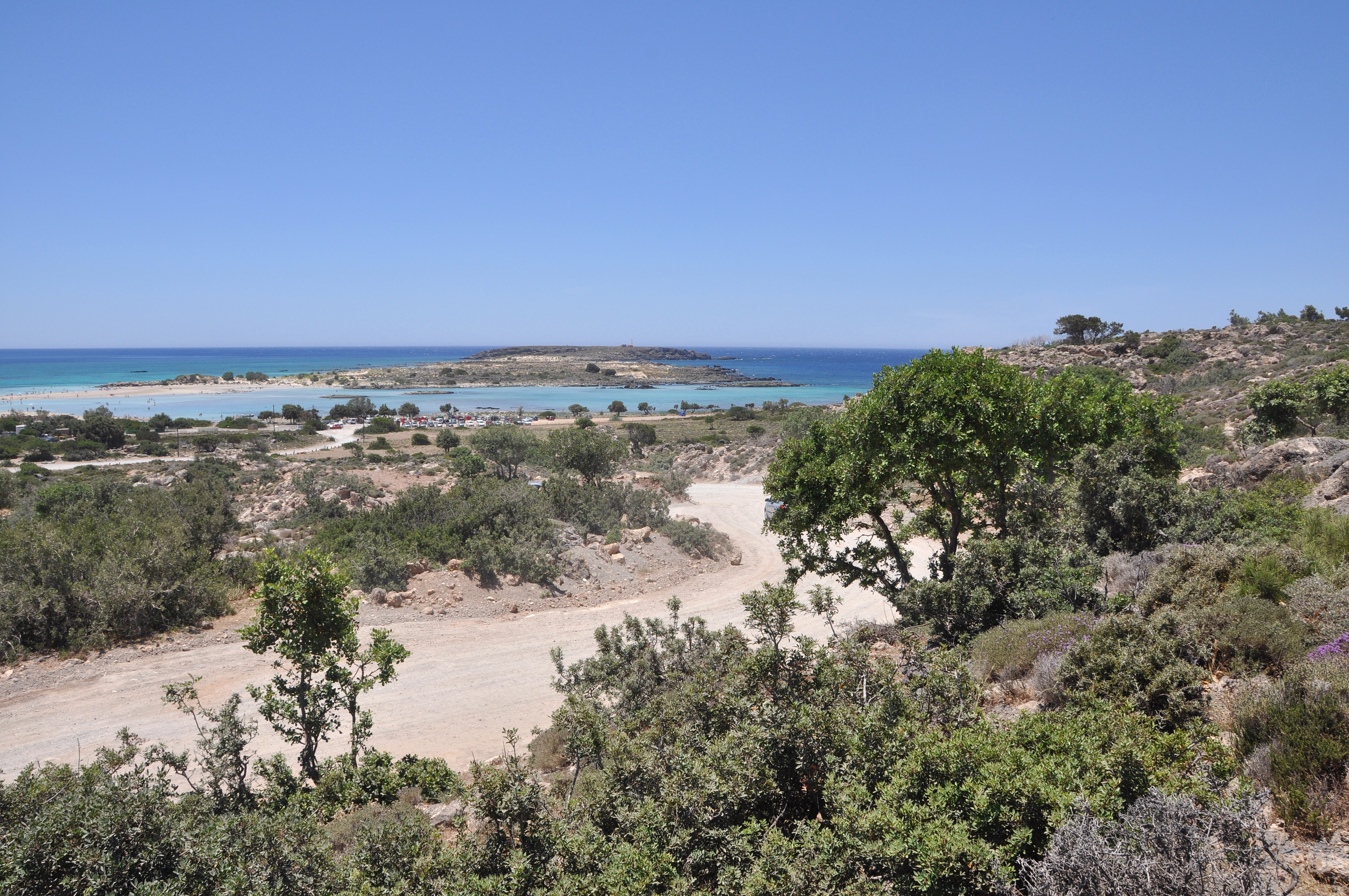
Elafonisi island in the distance from the coast of Crete.

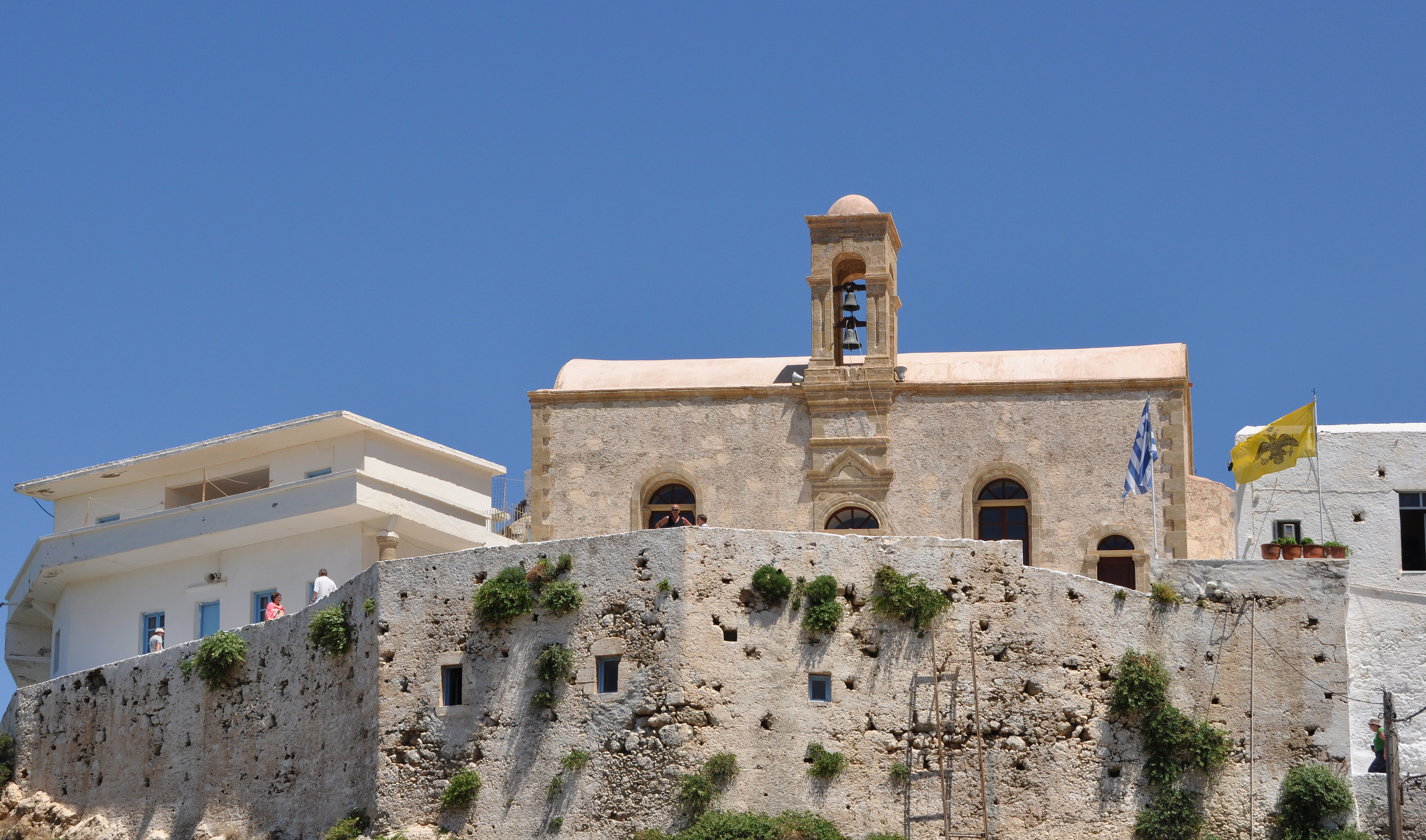
Chrysoskalitissa monastery.

== See also ==
- List of settlements in the Chania regional unit
