= Alikianos =

Alikianos Αλικιανός
- Community
- Location within Greece
- Coordinates: 35°27′N 23°55′E
- Country: Greece
- Administrative region: Crete
- Regional unit: Chania
- Municipality: Platanias
- Municipal unit: Mousouroi

Population (2021)
  - Community: 866
- Time zone: UTC+2 (EET)
  - Summer (DST): UTC+3 (EEST)

Alikianos (Greek: Αλικιανός) is the head village of the Mousouroi municipal unit in Chania regional unit, Crete located approximately 12.5 kilometers southwest of Chania. Alikianos is best known outside the island for the fierce fighting which took place there during the 1941 Battle of Crete, during which the 8th Greek Regiment (Provisional) aided by the local population, helped cover the retreat of the 10th New Zealand Division, to which it was attached. In retribution, the German paratroopers executed many civilians from Alikianos and the nearby villages.

== See also ==
- Alikianos executions
