= Mouzouras =

Akrotiri, Chania, Crete village/community

Mouzouras Μουζουράς
- Community
- Location within Greece
- Coordinates: 35°32′N 24°09′E
- Country: Greece
- Administrative region: Crete
- Regional unit: Chania
- Municipality: Chania
- Municipal unit: Akrotiri

Population (2021)
  - Community: 312
- Time zone: UTC+2 (EET)
  - Summer (DST): UTC+3 (EEST)

Mouzouras (Greek: Μουζουράς) is a village and a community in the municipal unit of Akrotiri, Chania regional unit, on the island of Crete, Greece. The community consists of the settlements Mouzouras, Agia Zoni, Galini and Kalorrouma.
