= Sirikari =

Sirikari Σηρικάρι
- Community
- Location within Greece
- Coordinates: 35°25′N 23°38′E
- Country: Greece
- Administrative region: Crete
- Regional unit: Chania
- Municipality: Kissamos
- Municipal unit: Kissamos
- Elevation: 512 m (1,680 ft)

Population (2021)
  - Community: 79
- Time zone: UTC+2 (EET)
  - Summer (DST): UTC+3 (EEST)
- Postal code: 73010
- Area code: 28220

Sirikari (Greek: Σηρικάρι) is a small mountain village (elevation 512 m) located in western Crete, in the regional unit of Chania, Greece. It is part of the municipality of Kissamos. It is 55 km to the west from Chania and 17 km to the south from Kissamos. Sirikari differs from other typical Greek villages in that it comprises 12 scattered neighbourhoods (Kioliana, Micheliana, Kontokrithiana, Stratigianna, Megalo Chorio, Aghios Ioannis, Katsikandarianna, Tsichlianna, Sineniana, Tzortzianna, Kostogiannides and Marouliana or Felesiana). The ones that are not populated anymore are Micheliana and Marouliana or Felesiana). The name is suggested to derive from the Byzantine surname Sirikarios, which means the person who makes silk linen, generally the silk-worker.

== History and population ==
The settlement is mentioned in three Venetian census reports. The name's etymology along with the presence of a Byzantine church (Aghioi Apostoloi), suggest that a settlement with the same name has been in the area since Byzantine times. The village saw its population drop dramatically over the past decades and now comprises 132 people (2001 census).

== Attractions ==
=== Chestnut forest ===
Sirikari has a big chestnut forest which is typical of the region. There is also a small river that runs through it which makes it a very nice scenery. The biggest annual festival (paniyiri) is held in this chestnut forest. Chestnuts are one of the main sources of the local agricultural economy.

=== Sirikari - Polyrrhenia Gorge ===
A beautiful gorge exists between Sirikari and the ancient acropolis of Polyrrhenia. A moderate path runs the gorge and it is an activity suggested by travel guides and local agents.

=== Agrotourism ===
Agrotourism is well established in the area. A few years ago, Milia (Greek: Μηλιά), a nearby abandoned village, was refurbished and opened as an eco-friendly inn.

=== Churches - Paniyiria ===
Villages in Greece have many small scattered churches and Sirikari is no exception. Each church holds an annual festive liturgy on the day of the saint's name celebration. After the liturgy, a paniyiri is held which involves live music, dancing and much food and wine. The biggest paniyiri in the area is Panagia's which is held on the 15th of August every year and draws crowds from the surrounding areas and villages. The paniyiri is held in the chestnut forest. Another very well known paniyiri is the Holy Cross one held on the 13th and 14 September every year.

The church of Aghioi Apostoloi was built in 1427. It is one of the Byzantine churches of the area worth visiting.
