= Kalyves =

Kalyves Καλύβες
- Community
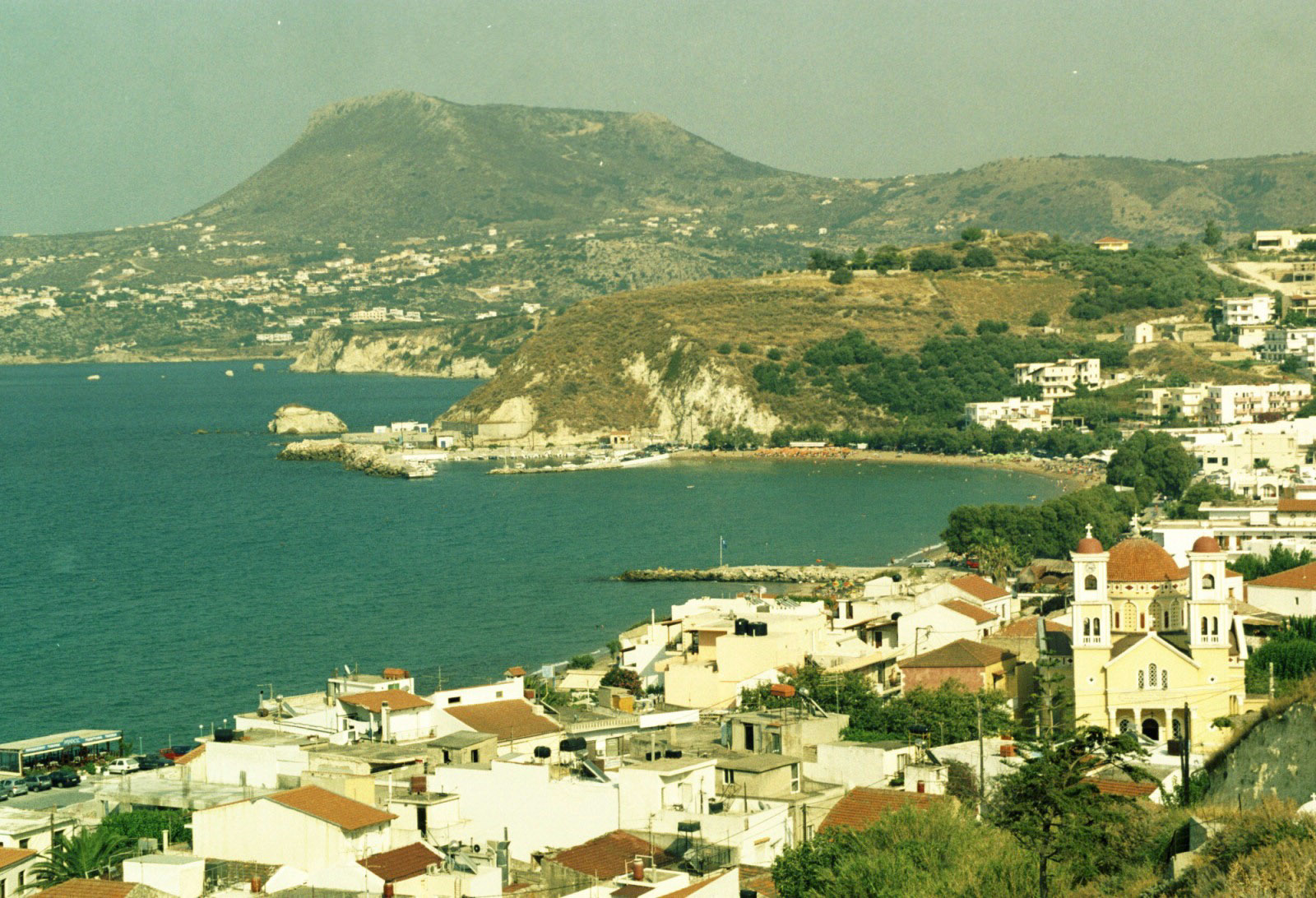
- Kalives on Souda Bay

- Location within Greece
- Coordinates: 35°27′N 24°10′E
- Country: Greece
- Administrative region: Crete
- Regional unit: Chania
- Municipality: Apokoronas
- Municipal unit: Armenoi

Population (2021)
  - Community: 1,457
- Time zone: UTC+2 (EET)
  - Summer (DST): UTC+3 (EEST)
- Vehicle registration: ΧΝ

Kalyves (Greek: Καλύβες) is a large village in Crete, Greece. It is the main village in the municipal unit of Armenoi.

== Description ==
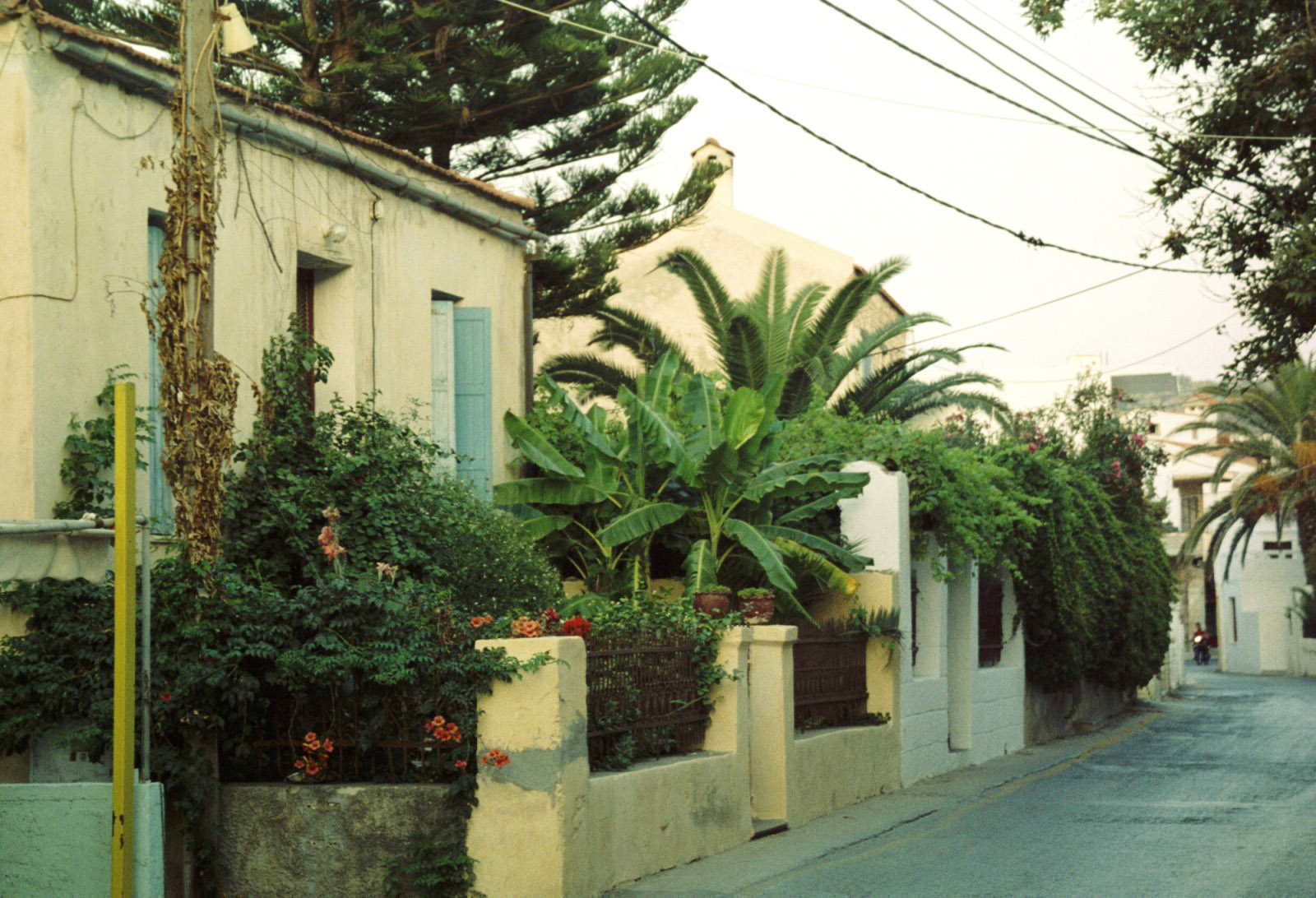
Kalives town

Kalyves is a seaside village of Apokoronas, 19 km east of Chania that borders the ancient town of Aptera.

== Historical population ==
Year	Village population	Community population
1981	1,069	-
1991	1,284	-
2001	1,285	1,408
2011	1,429	1,603
2021	1,304	1,457

== See also ==
- List of settlements in the Chania regional unit
