= Neo Chorio, Crete =

Neo Chorio Νέον Χωρίο
- Community
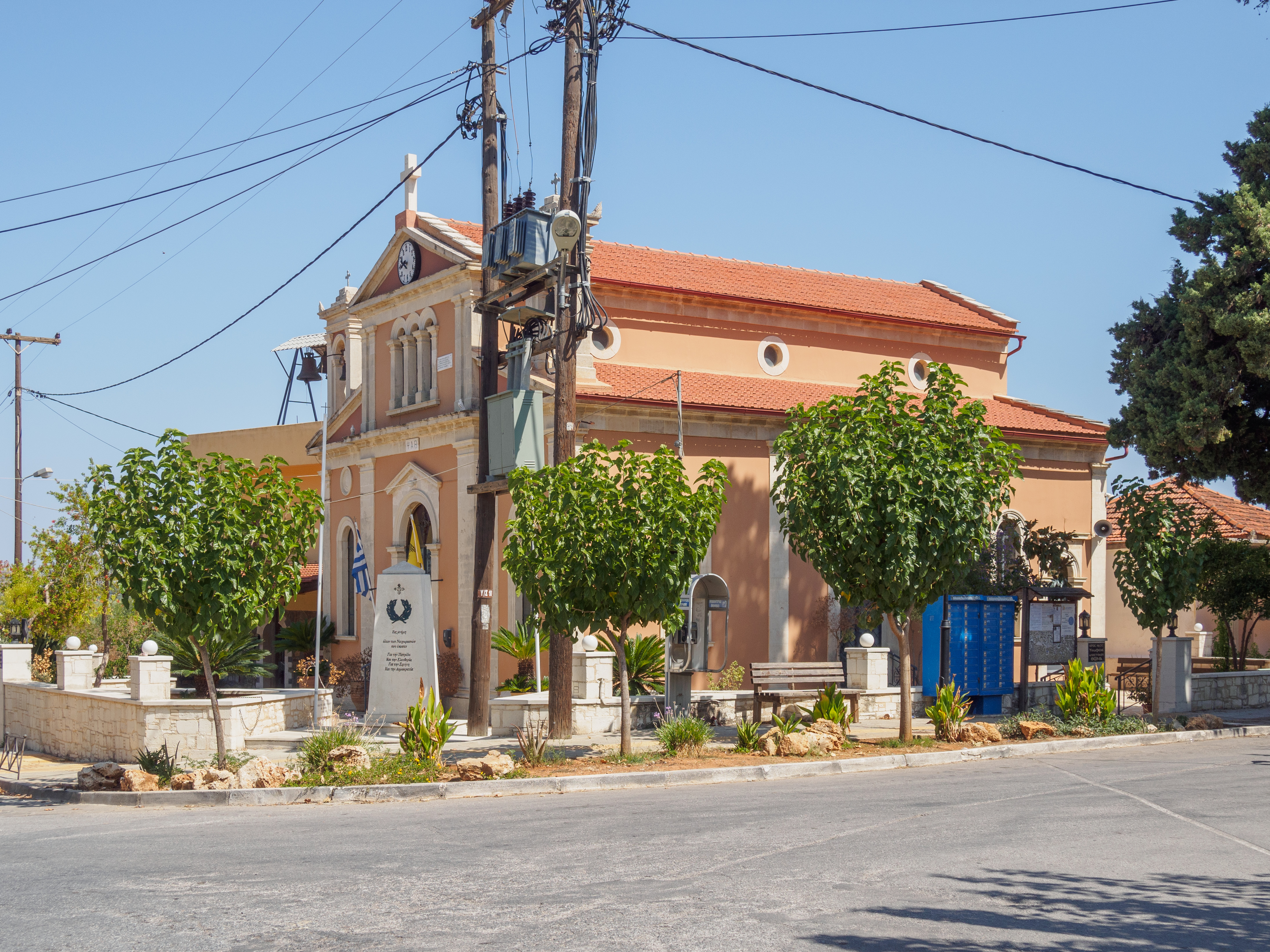
- The church of Saint Thomas, the main church of the village

- Location within Greece
- Coordinates: 35°25′20″N 24°08′29″E
- Country: Greece
- Administrative region: Crete
- Regional unit: Chania
- Municipality: Apokoronas
- Municipal unit: Armenoi

Population (2021)
  - Community: 590
- Time zone: UTC+2 (EET)
  - Summer (DST): UTC+3 (EEST)

Neo Chorio is a village located 25km (15.5 miles) southeast of Chania in the center of Apokoronas. It was named Neo ("new") Chorio because it was a new village, but it was built on the ruins of an old village which was destroyed during the raids in Crete. It is built on a stone hill on a plain that is crossed by the river Mantamas. Smaller rivers include: the Anavreti, the Koliakoudes, etc. According to tradition, the small town was originally settled in the Late Minoan era, on a site located in the northernmost part of the village where it still stands today. According to the census of 1881, the village had only 451 inhabitants. At the village square, there is a plane tree which is many centuries old. Under this tree, there is a famous well. The plane tree and the well have been there since the Venetian domination. In the past, water was supplied by the rivers Koliakoude and Mantama. Later, when the village was destroyed, the inhabitants moved south and people collected water from the Koliakoude river. Even today, there are still many wells and cisterns within the village, the most important of which is the well of Anavreti. Agios Thomas’s church is located in the village’s square and is a royal rhythm church. In the Turkish domination this church was used as a cemetery and a school. The Agios Gerasimos is a graphic little church which was built on a rock at the edge of the village going towards to Bryses. The Agios Therapontas church is Byzantine rhythm and was built in 1971. Today, the cemetery is located on a hill 100 meters high, located near the church of Koimisi tis Theotokou. During the Turkish domination, priests and nuns took on the role of teachers and secretly taught the Greek language to the children of the village. The only school in the village was built in 1900. A fort (Koules) was built by the Turks to control the passage from Apokoronas to Keramia.

== Bibliography ==
1. Παπαδάκη Α., " Το Νιο Χωριό: μια φορά κι έναν καιρό", εκδόσεις ΕΡΕΙΣΜΑ, Χανιά 2011 this book is written by a well-known author named Papadaki Alkyoni and published by "ΕΡΕΙΣΜΑ". The title of the book is "Neo chorio: once upon a time"
