= Cisamus (Aptera) =

Town of ancient Crete

Coordinates: 35°28′16″N 24°09′15″E

Cisamus or Kisamos (Ancient Greek: Κίσαμος) was town of ancient Crete and was the port of Aptera. It appears as one of two towns of the name in the Peutinger Table.

Its site is tentatively located at Kalami.
