= Keramia =

Keramia Κεραμιά
- Municipal unit
- Location within the regional unit

- Location within Greece
- Coordinates: 35°25′N 24°2′E
- Country: Greece
- Administrative region: Crete
- Regional unit: Chania
- Municipality: Chania

Area
  - Municipal unit: 89.7 km^{2} (34.6 sq mi)

Population (2021)
  - Municipal unit: 738
  - Municipal unit density: 8.23/km^{2} (21.3/sq mi)
- Time zone: UTC+2 (EET)
  - Summer (DST): UTC+3 (EEST)
- Postal code: 731 00
- Area code: 28210
- Vehicle registration: ΧΝ
- Website: Keramia Website

Keramia (Greek: Κεραμιά, Δήμος Κεραμιών) is a former municipality in the Chania regional unit, Crete, Greece. Since the 2011 local government reform it is part of the municipality Chania, of which it is a municipal unit. The municipal unit has an area of 89.722 km^{2} (34.642 sq mi). It is part of the former Kydonia Province.

Keramia covers the high villages in the foothills of the White Mountains (Lefka Ori) to the south of the city of Chania. Though apparently close to Chania, the access to the villages of Keramia is by narrow winding hill roads, and hence the area is little developed or visited by tourists.

The seat of the municipality was Gerolakos. The municipal unit also includes Malaxa, Katochori, Kontopoula and Drakona.

== See also ==
- List of communities of Chania
