= Gerani, Chania =

Village in Greece

Gerani Γεράνι
- Community
- Location within Greece
- Coordinates: 35°31′01″N 23°52′34″E
- Country: Greece
- Administrative region: Crete
- Regional unit: Chania
- Municipality: Platanias
- Municipal unit: Platanias

Area
  - Community: 6.398 km^{2} (2.470 sq mi)

Population (2021)
  - Community: 1,102
  - Density: 172.2/km^{2} (446.1/sq mi)
- Time zone: UTC+2 (EET)
  - Summer (DST): UTC+3 (EEST)

Gerani is a village and a community situated in the municipality of Platanias, Crete, Greece. It has a population of 1,102 according to the 2021 census, and it covers 6.398 square kilometers (2.470 sq mi). It is 14 kilometers (8.7 mi) from Chania, right next to the sea. The Gerani beach is awarded with the Blue Flag. There are plenty of traditional tavernas, car rental companies, supermarkets and hotels in the village.
