= Aptera (Greece) =

Archaeological site and ancient city in Western Crete, Greece

Coordinates: 35.4629°N 24.1420°E

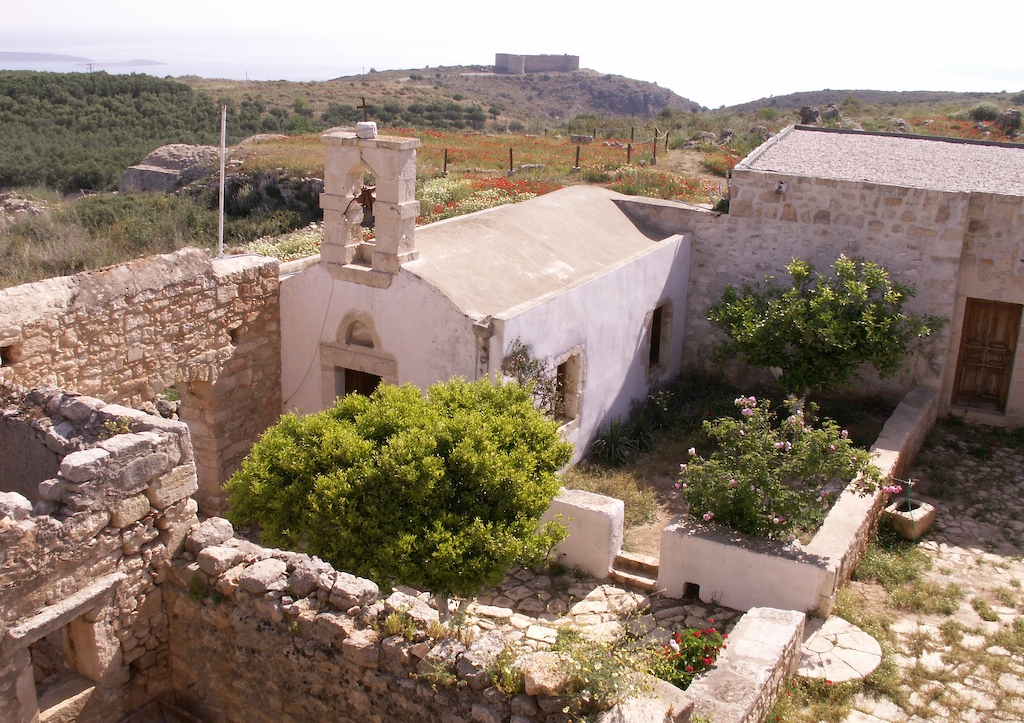
Monastery at Aptera.

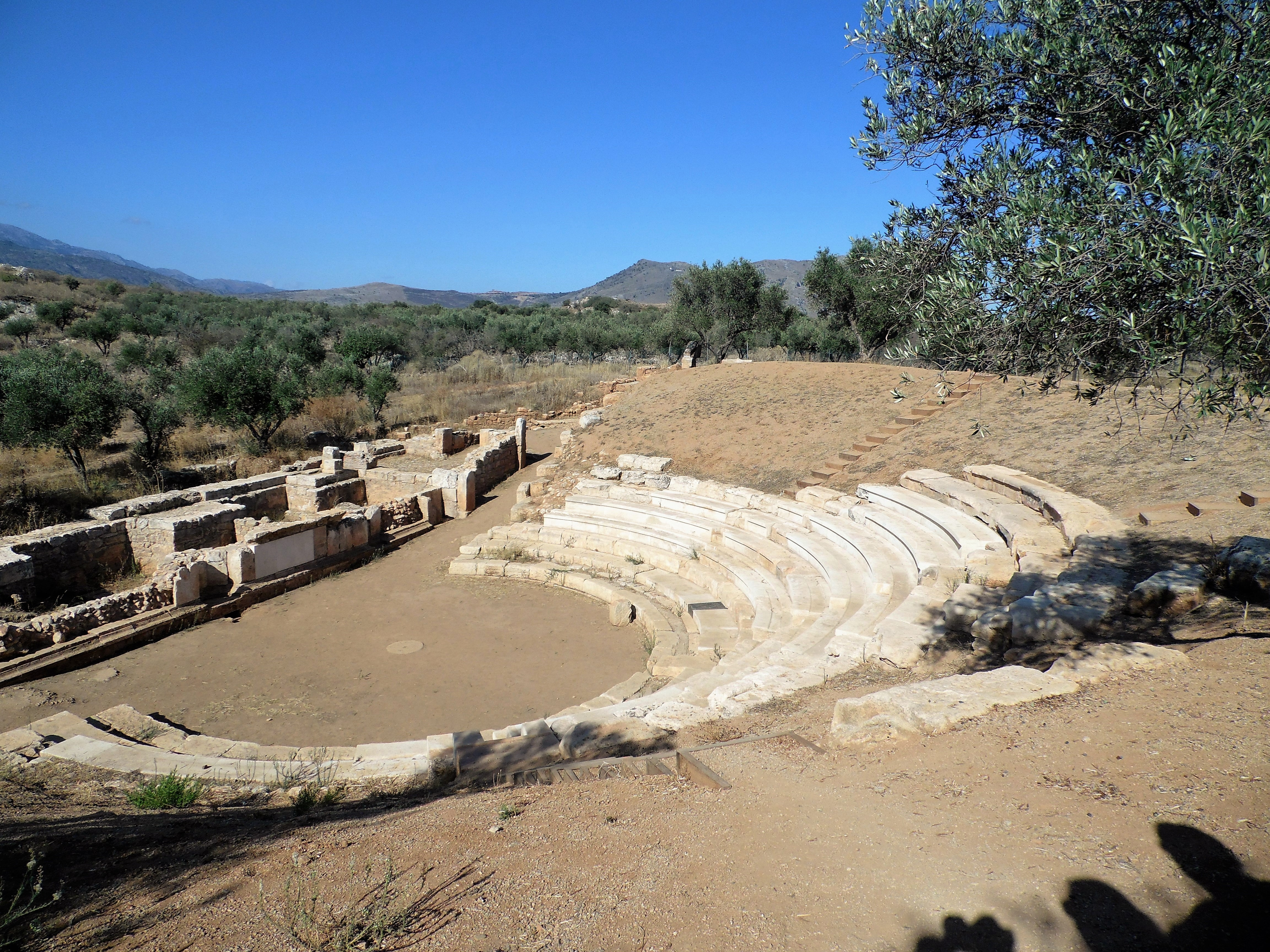
Ancient theater of Aptera

Aptera (Ἄπτερα or Ἀπτερία) or Apteron was an ancient city, now an archaeological site in Kalives in western Crete, a kilometre inland from the southern shore of Souda Bay, about 13 km east of the city of Chania in the municipality of Chania.

== History ==
It is mentioned (A-pa-ta-wa) in Linear B tablets from the 14th-13th centuries BC. With its highly fortunate geographical situation, the city-state was powerful from Minoan through Hellenistic times, when it gradually declined. However, the Minoan settlement of the Bronze Age was located about 1.5 km away from Aptera, at the place of the modern Stylos settlement.

In Greek mythology, Aptera was the site of the legendary contest between the Sirens and the Muses, when after the victory of the Muses, the Sirens lost the feathers of their wings from their shoulders, and having thus become white, cast themselves into the sea. The name of the city literally means "without wings", and the neighbouring islands Leucae means "white".

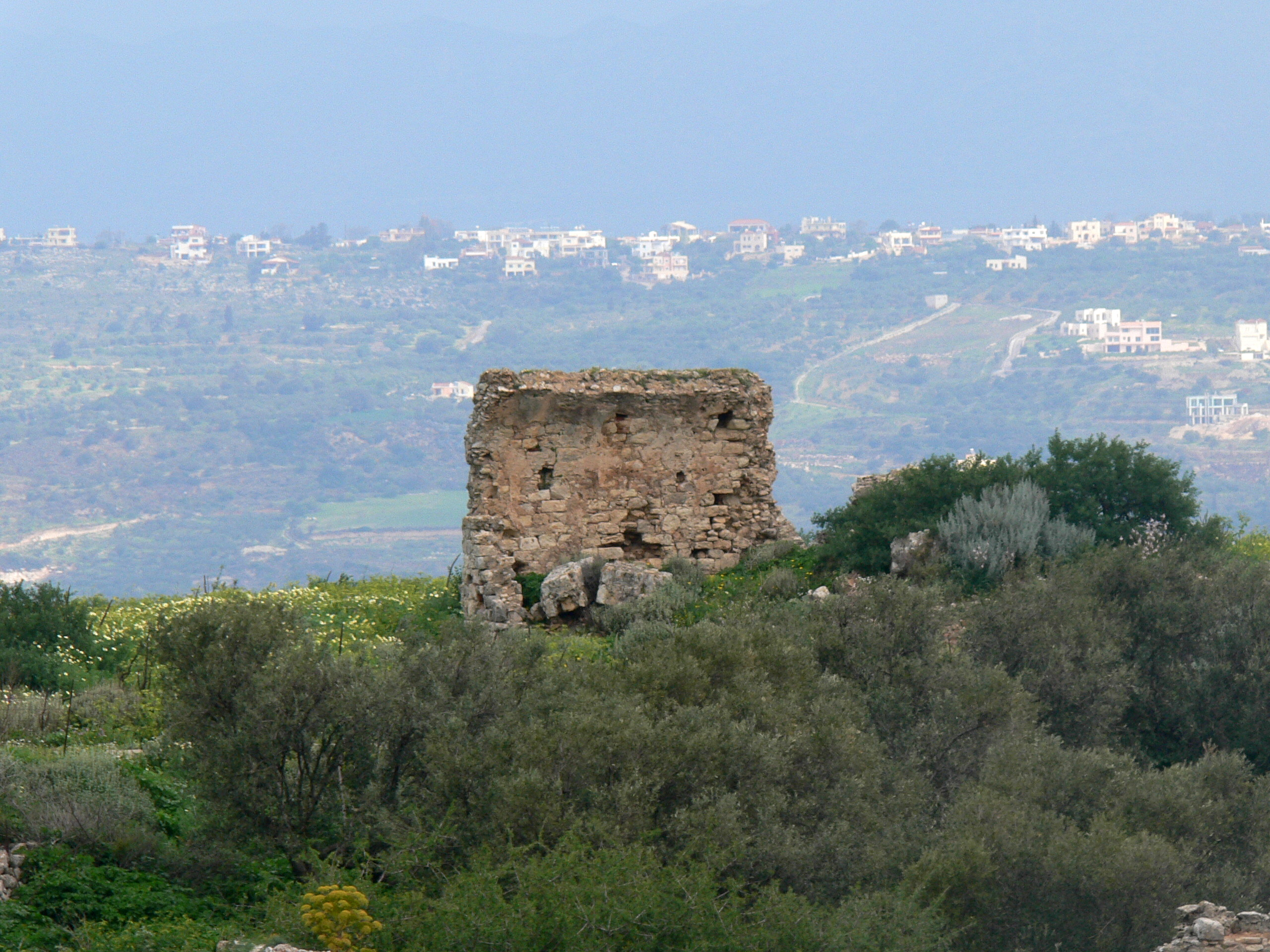
Aptera

In the third century BC, Aptera was at war with Kydonia, a prominent ancient city in northwestern Crete. In much of the Greek Archaic Period, Aptera was under the control of Kydonia. During the Lyttian War in 220 BC, Aptera was at one time in alliance with Knossos but was afterwards compelled by the Polyrrhenians to side with them against that city. The port of Aptera according to Strabo was Cisamus.

It was destroyed by earthquake during the 7th century. By the 12th century, a monastery of St. John Theologos had been built on the site; it continued in operation until 1964. The site is now maintained by the Greek Ministry of Culture, Department of Antiquities. The hilltop, about 150 metres above the sea, commands views of Souda Bay and the Akrotiri Peninsula to the north, the Lefka Ori (White Mountains) to the south, and Kalives and the Turkish Izzedin Fortress to the east; the city of Chania is not quite visible to the west.

There are several structures within the square monastery enclosure, including a chapel and a two-story block of monks' cells. The surrounding site is notable for a two-part temple from the 5th century BC, a large three-vaulted Roman cistern, Roman baths, and parts of several Doric temples. An ancient theater and a Roman peristyle villa have also been discovered on the site.

== See also ==
- Khania Plain
