= Chania Plain =

Landform on the island of Crete, Greece

The Chania Plain is a relatively level landform spreading southward from the city of Chania on the island of Crete in the present day country of Greece. The Chania Plain has been used as a logical study area for air pollution transport in the vicinity of Chania. In ancient times the city of Kydonia, the site of present-day Chania, controlled an expansive area which included the Chania Plain lying to its south at least to Malaxa Mountain.

== See also ==
- Kastelli Hill
- Polichne
- Malaxa
