= Kolymvari =

Place in Greece

Kolymvari Κολυμβάρι
- Municipal unit
- Location within the regional unit

- Location within Greece
- Coordinates: 35°32′N 23°47′E
- Country: Greece
- Administrative region: Crete
- Regional unit: Chania
- Municipality: Platanias

Area
  - Municipal unit: 150.0 km^{2} (57.9 sq mi)

Population (2021)
  - Municipal unit: 4,139
  - Municipal unit density: 27.59/km^{2} (71.47/sq mi)
  - Community: 1,079
- Time zone: UTC+2 (EET)
  - Summer (DST): UTC+3 (EEST)
- Postal code: 730 06
- Area code: 28240
- Vehicle registration: ΧΝ, XB
- Website: Kolymvari Website

Kolymvari (Greek: Κολυμβάρι, Δήμος Κολυμβαρίου), also known as Kolymbari (Greek: Κολυμπάρι), is a coastal town at the southeastern end of the Rodopou peninsula on the Gulf of Chania. Kolymvari was formerly a municipality in the Chania regional unit, Crete, Greece. Since the 2011 local government reform it has been a municipal unit of the municipality Platanias. It was also formerly part of the Kissamos province, which covered the northwest of Chania Prefecture. The municipal unit has an area of 149.99 km^{2} (57.91 sq mi), including the mostly uninhabited and barren Rodopou peninsula to the west and some villages to the south: Rodopou, Afrata, Vasilopoulo, Spilia, Kares, Episkopi, Vouves, Glossa, Panethimos, Nochia, Deliana, Drakona, Ravdouchas, Kalidonia, and Kamisiana.

Kolymvari has only rocky beaches and is thus not as popular with tourists as the nearby resorts of Maleme and Platanias. Near the town is the historic Moni Gonia Monastery. The Spiliakos river enters the sea at Kolymvari.

== See also ==
- List of communities of Chania
