= Kissamos =

Kissamos Κίσσαμος
- Municipality
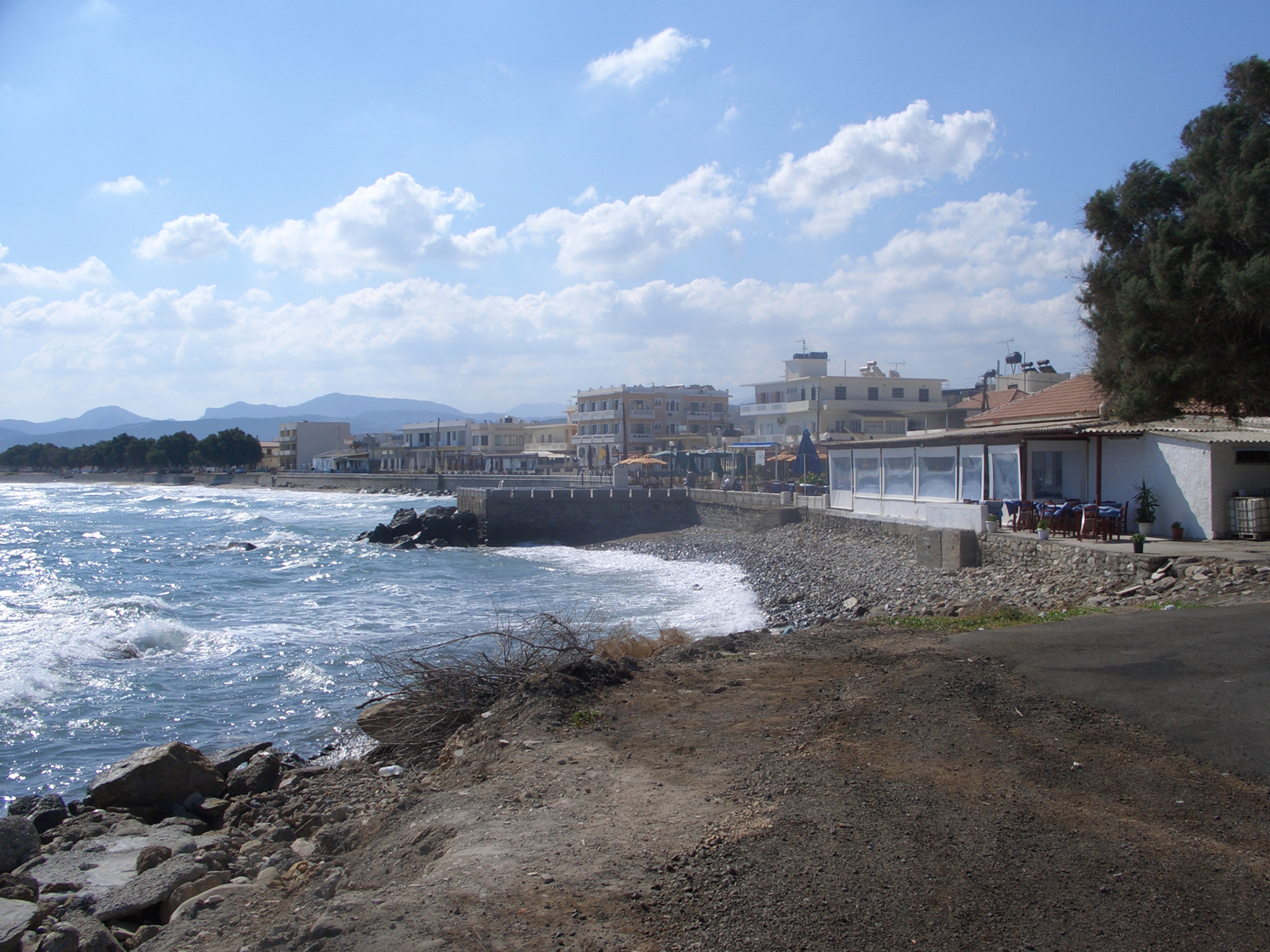
- Kissamos

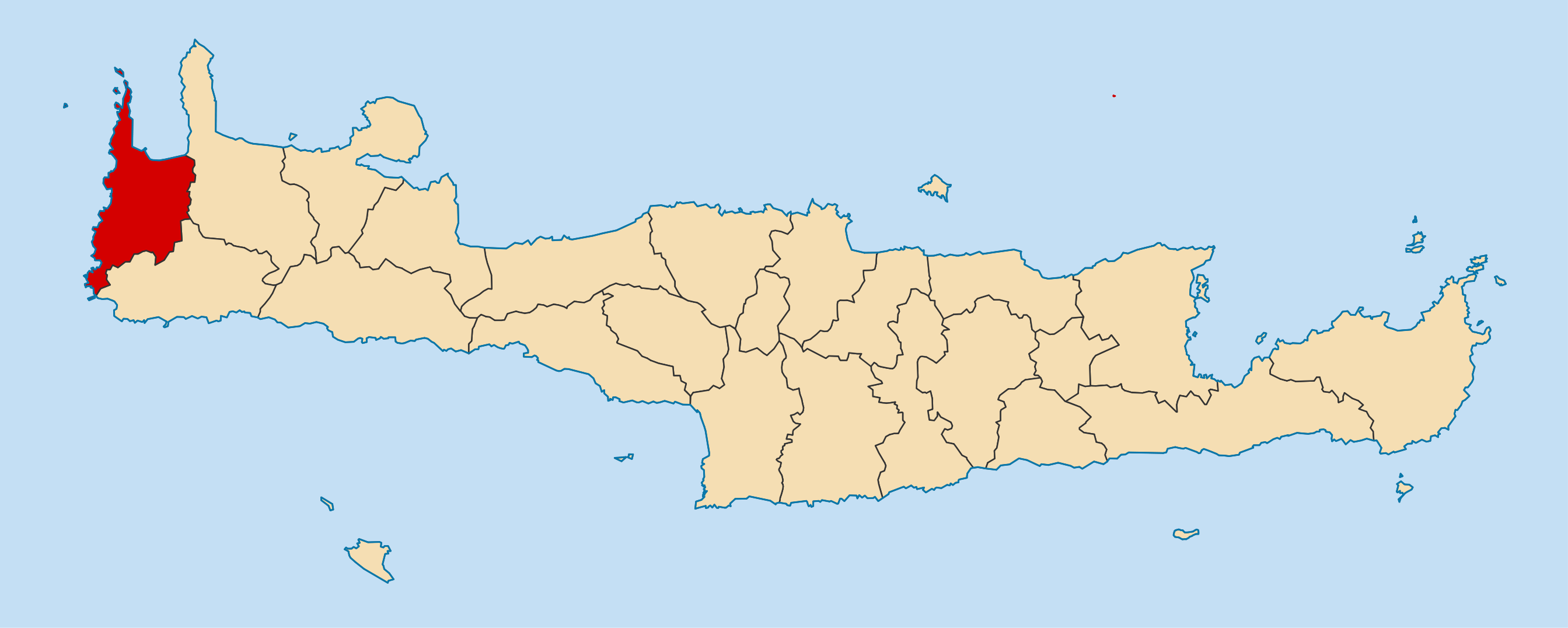

- Location within Greece
- Coordinates: 35°29′N 23°39′E
- Country: Greece
- Administrative region: Crete
- Regional unit: Chania

Government
  - Mayor: Georgios Mylonakis (since 2019)

Area
  - Municipality: 341.0 km^{2} (131.7 sq mi)
  - Municipal unit: 149.0 km^{2} (57.5 sq mi)

Population (2021)
  - Municipality: 10,632
  - Density: 31.18/km^{2} (80.75/sq mi)
  - Municipal unit: 7,608
  - Municipal unit density: 51.06/km^{2} (132.2/sq mi)
  - Community: 4,321
- Time zone: UTC+2 (EET)
  - Summer (DST): UTC+3 (EEST)
- Postal code: 734 00
- Area code: 28220
- Vehicle registration: ΧΝ, XB

Kissamos (Greek: Κίσσαμος) is a town and a municipality in the west of the island of Crete, Greece. It is part of the Chania regional unit and of the former Kissamos Province which covers the northwest corner of the island. The town of Kissamos is also known as Kastelli Kissamou and often known simply as Kastelli after the Venetian castle that was there. It is now a port and fishing harbour, with a regular ferry from the Peloponnese via Kythira. A town museum is located in the old Venetian governor's palace and there have been important archaeological finds in the town, including fine mosaics, dating from the Roman city of Kisamos (Κίσαμος, Latinized as Cisamus). The head town of the municipality (Δήμος Κισσάμου) is Kastelli-Kissamos itself.

== History ==
Strabo said that ancient Cisamus was dependent on Aptera and was its naval arsenal. The Peutinger Table distinguishes two port towns in Crete called Cisamus, Modern Kissamos (at 35°29′38″N 23°39′25″E) is much further west than where Aptera is now placed (at 35°27′46″N 24°8′31″E). It was excluded already by Pashley in 1837 as being, of the two ancient maritime Cretan cities named Kisamos, the one associated with Aptera. In the past, when the port of Aptera was thought to be present-day Kissamos, some supposed Aptera to be identical with Polyrrhenia, and Kissamos to be the port of Polyrrhenia. However, Strabo and other ancient sources say that Polyrrhenia's port was at Phalasarna on the west coast.

== Ecclesiastical history ==
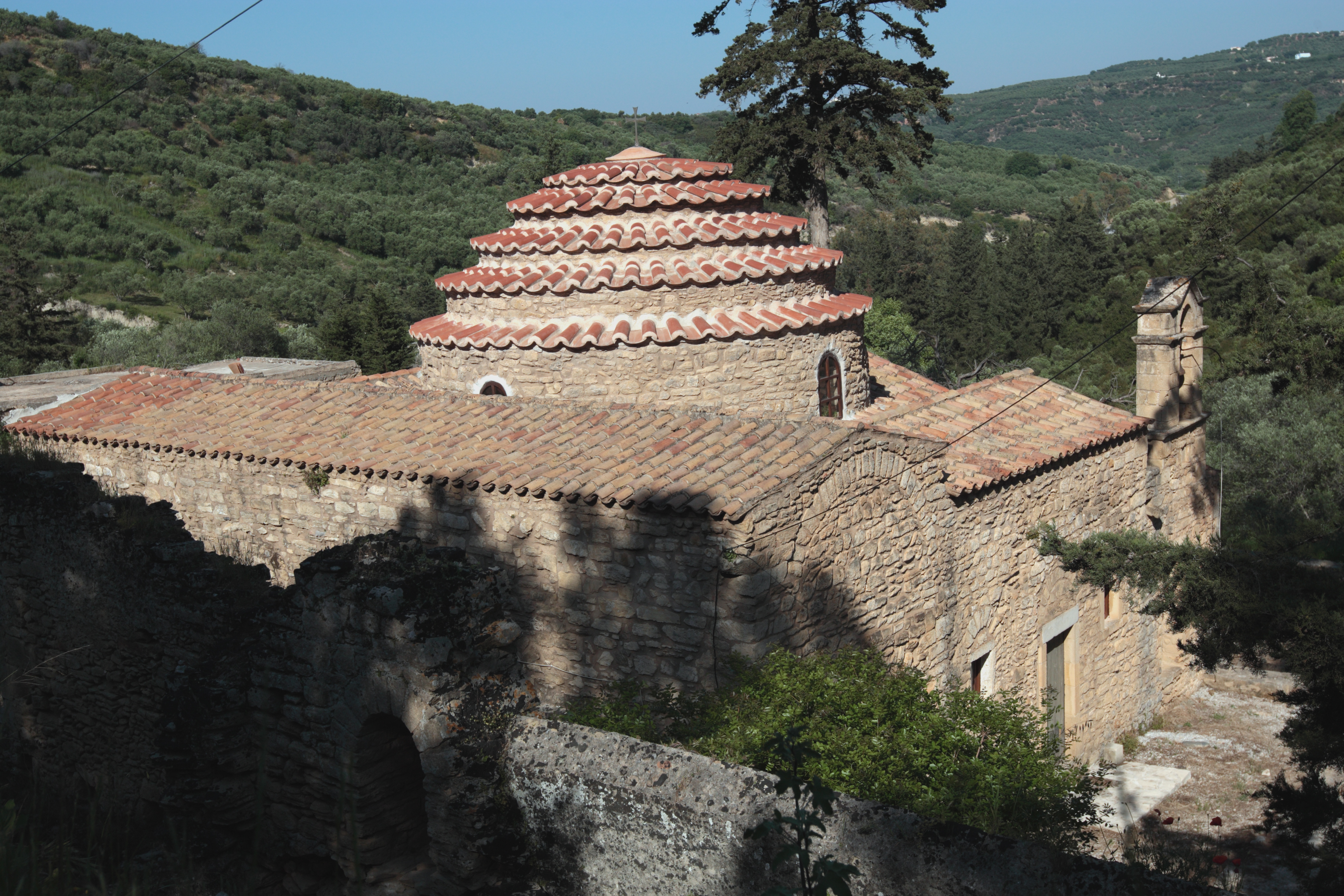
The Rotunda of Michael Archangelos in Episkopi - Kissamos

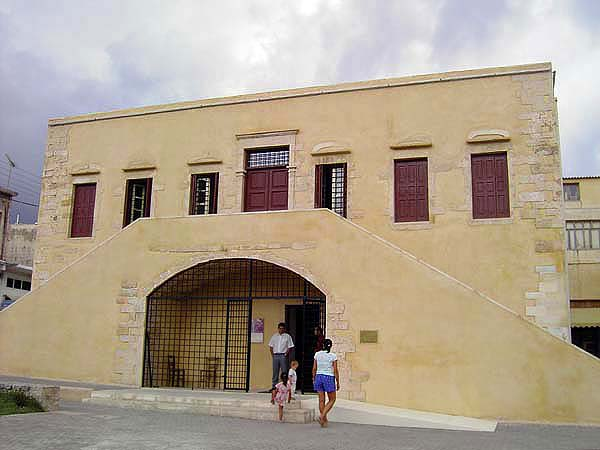
Kissamos archeological museum

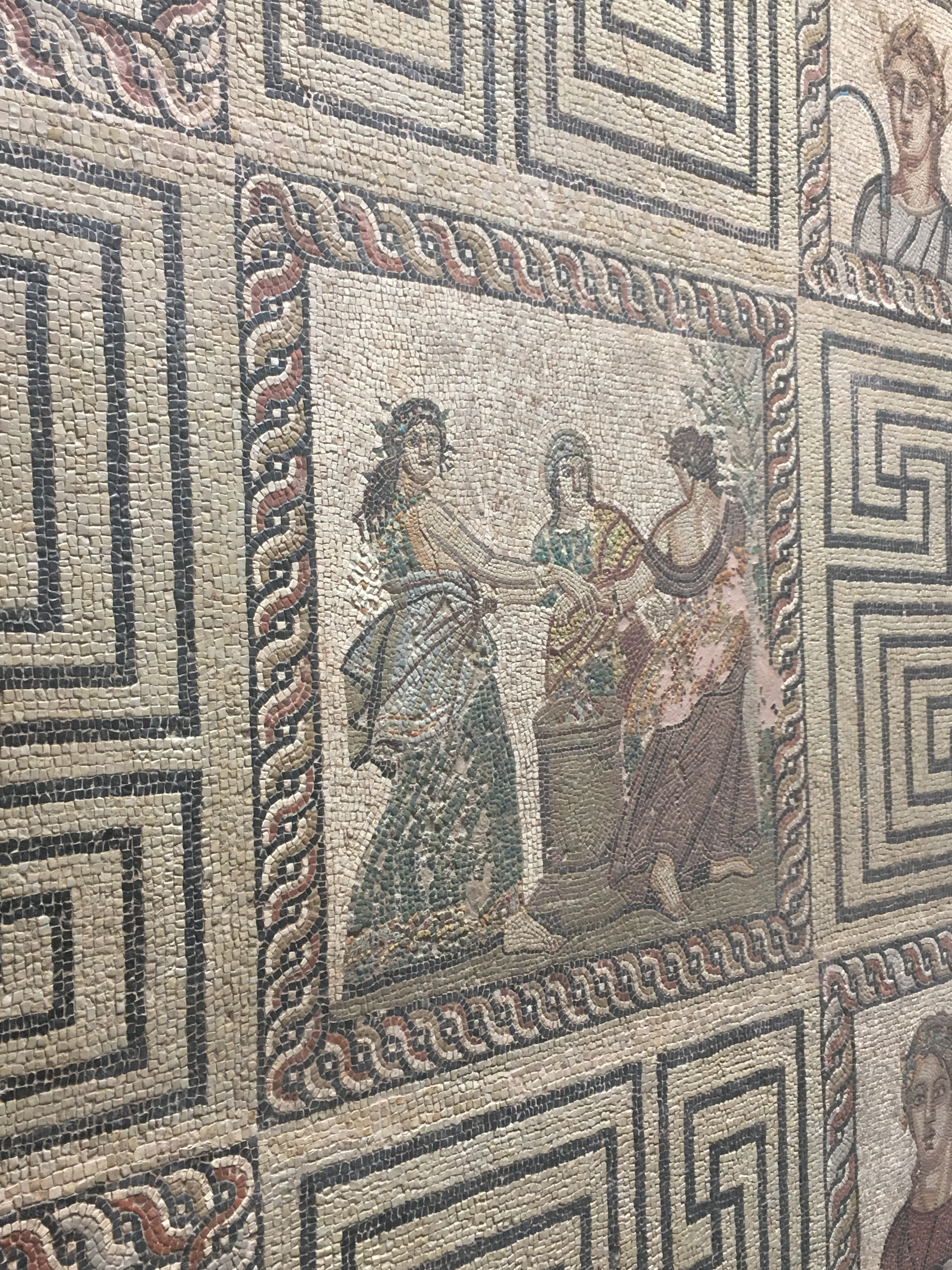
Mosaic in museum

Ancient Cisamus became a Christian bishopric, a suffragan of the metropolitan see of Gortyna, the capital of the Roman province of Crete. Only two of its first-millennium bishops are named in extant contemporary documents: Theopemptus (according to 18th-century Lequien), Nicetas (according to 20th-century Janin) at the Trullan Council in 692, and Leo at the Second Council of Nicaea in 787.

=== Orthodox bishopric ===
The bishopric is still a residential see of the Eastern Orthodox Church of Crete.

=== Latin diocese ===
After the Venetian conquest of Crete in 1212, Kissamos became a Latin Church diocese. The names of more than 20 residential Latin bishops from then until the end of the 16th century are known, including:

- Angelo Barbarigo (1383 – 1406.09.21)
- Prospero Santacroce (1548.03.22 – 1572?)

The Latin residential bishopric of Latin: Cisamus (Curiate Italian Cisamo) was suppressed in around 1600, and only a titular bishopric remains.

== Municipality ==
Kissamos municipality

The municipality of Kissamos was formed at the 2011 local government reform by the merger of three former municipalities, which became municipal units:

- Kissamos
- Inachori
- Mythimna

The municipality has an area of 341.018 km^{2} (131.668 sq mi) and the municipal unit has an area of 149.034 km^{2} (57.542 sq mi). The municipal unit of Kissamos includes the Gramvousa peninsula (Chernisos Gramvousas Χερσόνησος Γραμβούσας) in the northwest and the adjacent Gramvousa islets, as well as the islet of Pontikonisi, and the villages of Sfinari, Koukounaras, Polirinia, Platanos, Lousakia, Sirikari, Kallergiania and Kalathena. It forms the extreme western part of the Chania regional unit, and of Crete. It is bordered by Platanias to the East, and by Kantanos-Selino to the south.

== Former province ==
The province of Kissamos (Greek: Επαρχία Κισσάμου) was one of the provinces of the Chania Prefecture. Its territory corresponded with that of the current municipality of Kissamos, and the municipal units of Kolymvari and Voukolies (partly). It was abolished in 2006.

== Notable locals ==
- Manos Katrakis (1908–1984), actor
- Giorgis Koutsourelis (1914–1994), Cretan music composer

== See also ==
- List of communities of Chania

== Sources and external links ==
- Municipality description
- Kissamos TV Official Website
- The district of Kissamos
- GCatholic with Latin residential and titular incumbent biography links
