= Malaxa, Crete =

Malaxa Μαλάξα
- Community
- Location within Greece
- Coordinates: 35°28′N 24°04′E
- Country: Greece
- Administrative region: Crete
- Regional unit: Chania
- Municipality: Chania
- Municipal unit: Keramia

Population (2021)
  - Community: 150
- Time zone: UTC+2 (EET)
  - Summer (DST): UTC+3 (EEST)

Malaxa (Greek: Μαλάξα) is a village in the Chania regional unit on Crete in Greece. The 2021 census counted a population of 150 people in the village. In ancient times the Malaxa area was under the sphere of influence of the nearby powerful city of Kydonia. Malaxa lies on the feet of the Lefka Ori, and is separated from the large city of Chania by the Chania Plain.
