= Kydonia Province =

Abolished Greek province

Kydonia Province Επαρχία Κυδωνίας
- Province of Greece
- 2006
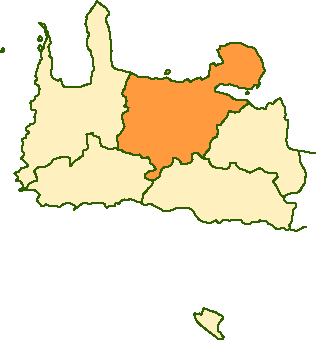
- Capital: Chania

Kydonia Province (Greek: Επαρχία Κυδωνίας) was one of the province of Chania Prefecture, Crete, Greece. Its territory corresponded with that of the current municipalities Chania and Platanias, except the municipal units Kolymvari and Voukolies (partly). It was abolished in 2006.
