= Kastelli Hill =

Landform in Chania, Greece

Coordinates: 35.5173°N 24.0196°E

Kastelli Hill (Greece)

Kastelli Hill (also Kasteli; Greek: Λόφος Καστέλλι or Καστέλι) is a landform at the city of Chania on the island of Crete in the present day country of Greece. The Minoan city of ancient Cydonia was centered on Kastelli Hill, which later was selected by the Romans as the site of an acropolis.

== Archaeological excavations at Kastelli Hill ==
Archaeological evidence indicates continuous inhabitation from the Neolithic until present time, except for a minor hiatus during the Late Bronze Age. Yannis Tzedakis initiated excavations at Kastelli Hill 1964–1969. The then director of the Swedish Institute at Athens Carl-Gustav Styrenius was contacted to discuss a potential collaboration and the Greek-Swedish collaboration was initiated in 1969. Since the 1970's danish archaeologists made significant contributions to the project. Besides uncovering an impressive urban settlement, the excavations at Kastelli Hill firmly identify an important Minoan centre on western Crete, it was previously believed that Minoan influence was limited the eastern half of the island. Swedish archaeologists carried out new excavations in 1989 - 1990, where five Linear B tablets were found, the only ones found outside of Knossos since the beginning of the 20th century. In 2010 the Danish Institute at Athens joined the project as a full participant, a collaboration that continued until the end of active field work in 2014. During excavations, extensive remains of structures and large amounts of pottery were uncovered. Among the more spectacular founds were two Linear A tablets and several seal stamps.

== See also ==
- Swedish Institute at Athens

== Sources ==
- Swedish Institute at Athens - Kastelli hill, Chania: https://www.sia.gr/en/articles.php?tid=366&page=1

== See also ==
- Minoan civilisation
