= Agia Marina, Crete =

Agia Marina Αγία Μαρίνα
- Community
- Location within Greece
- Coordinates: 35°31′N 23°56′E
- Country: Greece
- Administrative region: Crete
- Regional unit: Chania
- Municipality: Chania
- Municipal unit: Nea Kydonia

Area
  - Community: 5.324 km^{2} (2.056 sq mi)

Population (2021)
  - Community: 1,679
  - Density: 315.4/km^{2} (816.8/sq mi)
- Time zone: UTC+2 (EET)
  - Summer (DST): UTC+3 (EEST)
- Postal code: 731 00
- Area code: 28210
- Vehicle registration: ΧΝ, XB

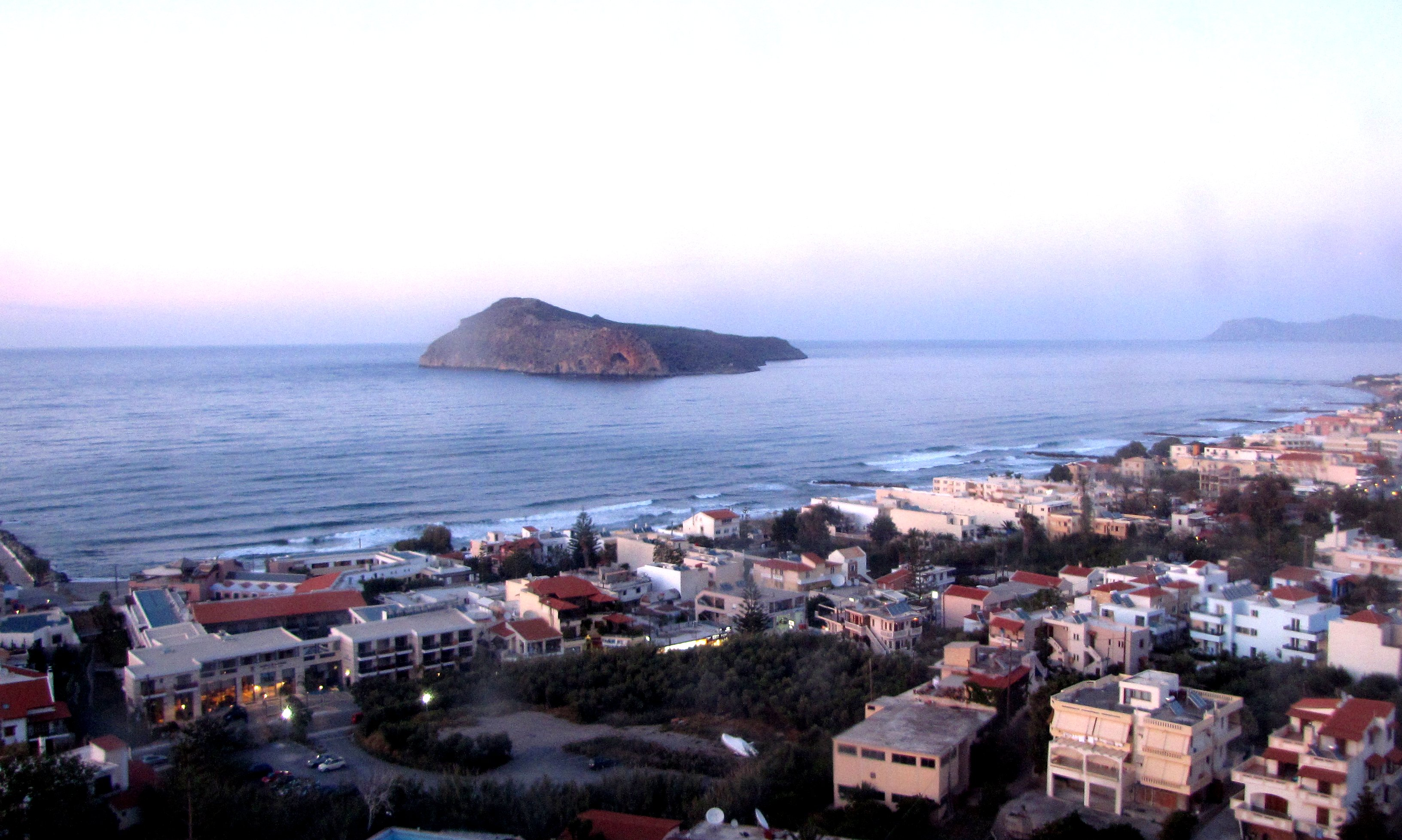

Agia Marina is a town on the island of Crete in Greece. Since the 2011 local government reform it is part of the municipality Chania, of which it is a community. It has a population of 1,679 (2021 census) and covers an area of 5.324 km^{2} (2.056 sq mi). It is 10 km west from Chania.
