= Armenoi =

Armenoi Αρμένοι
- Municipal unit
- Location within the regional unit

- Location within Greece
- Coordinates: 35°27′N 24°10′E
- Country: Greece
- Administrative region: Crete
- Regional unit: Chania
- Municipality: Apokoronas

Area
  - Municipal unit: 55.3 km^{2} (21.4 sq mi)
- Elevation: 600 m (2,000 ft)

Population (2021)
  - Municipal unit: 3,159
  - Municipal unit density: 57.1/km^{2} (148/sq mi)
  - Community: 411
- Time zone: UTC+2 (EET)
  - Summer (DST): UTC+3 (EEST)
- Postal code: 730 08
- Area code: 28250
- Vehicle registration: ΧΝ

Armenoi (Greek: Αρμένοι, also transliterated as Armeni) is a village and former municipality in the Chania regional unit, Crete, Greece. Since the 2011 local government reform it is part of the municipality Apokoronas, of which it is a municipal unit. The municipal unit has an area of 55.292 km^{2} (21.348 sq mi). The seat of the municipality is in the village of Kalyves.

Armenoi is located inland from Kalyves on the north coast of the island, at the mouth of Souda Bay. A relatively large village, it lies on good agricultural land in the Apokoronas, with groves of avocado, orange and olives around. The village has two large tavernas of good reputation, a grill in summer months and a kafenion, as well as a butcher and general store. The village is shaded by platania trees (Oriental Plane) and the Kiliaris river. The church of Ag. Nikolaos is large and imposing, giving an air of wealth to the village.
