= Voukolies =

Voukolies Βουκολιές
- Municipal unit
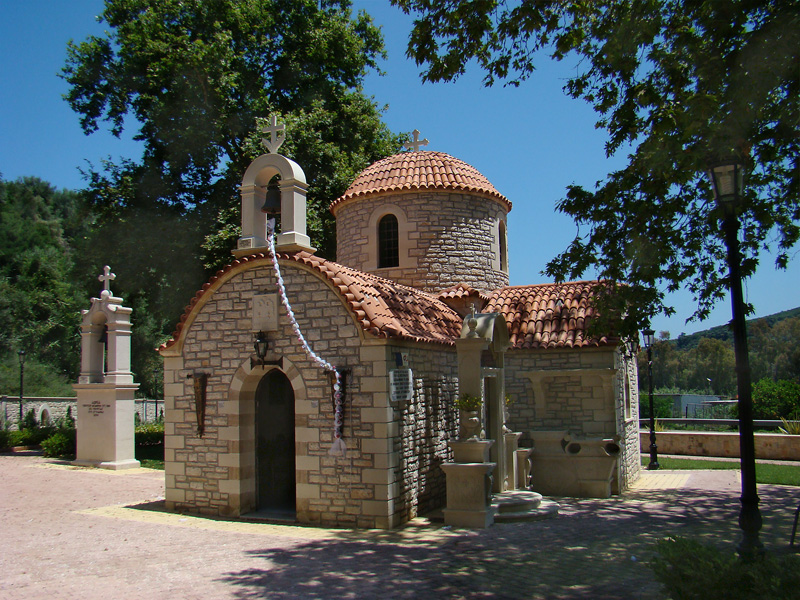
- Near Koulkouthiana

- Location within the regional unit

- Location within Greece
- Coordinates: 35°29′N 23°49′E
- Country: Greece
- Administrative region: Crete
- Regional unit: Chania
- Municipality: Platanias

Area
  - Municipal unit: 75.1 km^{2} (29.0 sq mi)

Population (2021)
  - Municipal unit: 2,877
  - Municipal unit density: 38.3/km^{2} (99.2/sq mi)
  - Community: 939
- Time zone: UTC+2 (EET)
  - Summer (DST): UTC+3 (EEST)
- Postal code: 730 02
- Area code: 28240
- Vehicle registration: ΧΝ, XB
- Website: Voukolies Website

Voukolies (Greek: Βουκολιές, Δήμος Βουκολιών) is a town and former municipality in the Chania regional unit, Crete, Greece. Since the 2011 local government reform it is part of the municipality Platanias, of which it is a municipal unit. The municipal unit has an area of 75.110 km^{2} (29.000 sq mi). It was part of the former Kissamos province which covered the northwestern part of Chania Prefecture. Voukoulies is a large village with an important Saturday morning market. The municipal unit of Voukoulies extends from Tavronitis on the north coast to the foothills of the White Mountains (Lefka Ori). The seat of the municipality was Voukolies itself. The municipal unit also includes Tavronitis, Neriana, Kakopetros, Polemarchi, Neo Chorio, Anoskeli and Palea Roumata.

== See also ==
- List of communities of Chania
