= Platanias =

Platanias Πλατανιάς
- Municipality
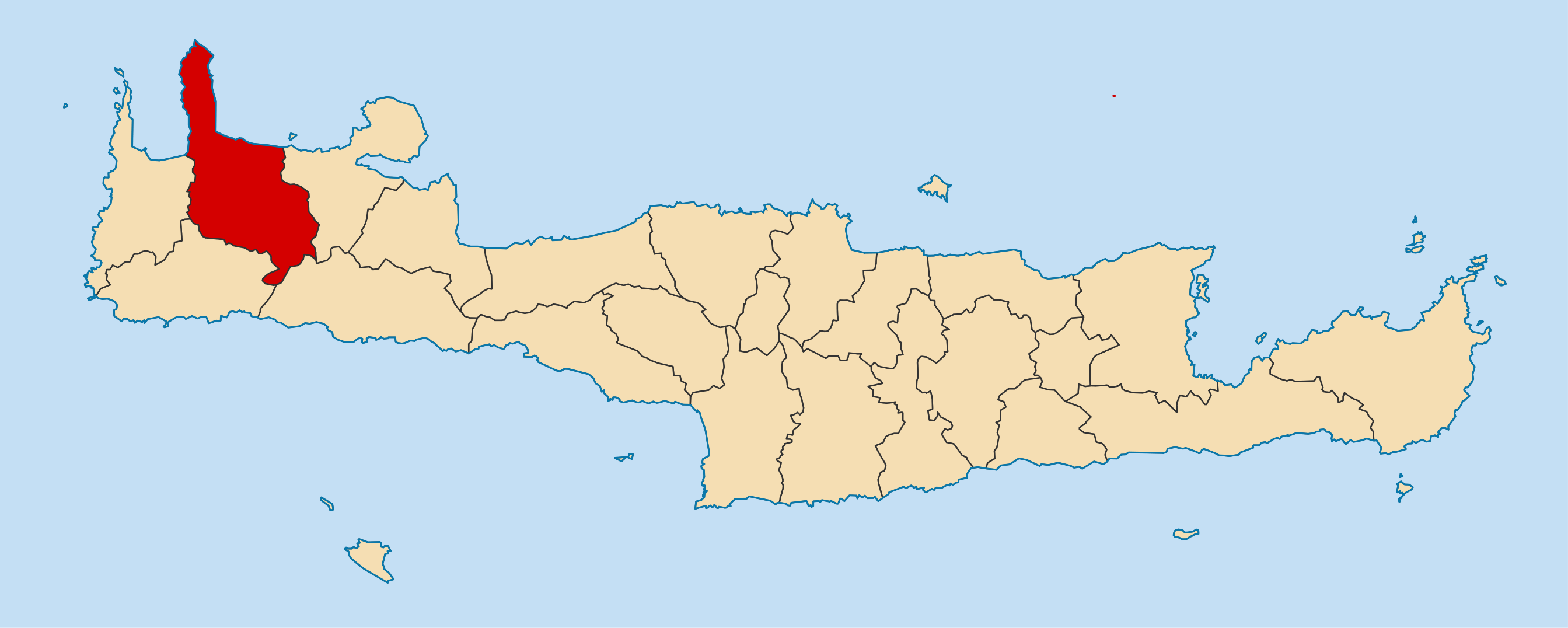

- Location within Greece
- Coordinates: 35°31′N 23°54′E
- Country: Greece
- Administrative region: Crete
- Regional unit: Chania

Government
  - Mayor: Ioannis Malandrakis (since 2011)

Area
  - Municipality: 491.8 km^{2} (189.9 sq mi)
  - Municipal unit: 74.9 km^{2} (28.9 sq mi)
- Elevation: 10 m (33 ft)

Population (2021)
  - Municipality: 15,299
  - Density: 31.11/km^{2} (80.57/sq mi)
  - Municipal unit: 4,665
  - Municipal unit density: 62.3/km^{2} (161/sq mi)
  - Community: 953
- Time zone: UTC+2 (EET)
  - Summer (DST): UTC+3 (EEST)
- Postal code: 730 14
- Area code: 28210
- Vehicle registration: ΧΝ, XB

Platanias (Greek: Πλατανιάς) is a village and municipality on the Greek island of Crete. It is located about 10 km (6.2 mi) west from the city of Chania and east of Kissamos, on Chania Bay. The seat of the municipality is the village Gerani. Platanias (and the neighbouring village of Agia Marina) is a popular tourism village with beaches, several hotels, restaurants, bars, nightclubs and souvenir shops. The area is especially popular with Scandinavian tourists with the season running from April to October. Not far from the coast is the island of Agioi Theodoroi.

== Municipality ==
The municipality Platanias was formed at the 2011 local government reform by the merger of the following 4 former municipalities, that became municipal units:

- Kolymvari
- Mousouroi
- Platanias
- Voukolies

The municipality has an area of 491.78 km^{2} (189.88 sq mi), the municipal unit 74.93 km^{2} (28.93 sq mi).

It lies within the Chania regional unit and is numbered 6 on the map of the Chania region. It is on the north coast, forming the eastern shore of Kissamos Bay (Kolpos Kissamou Kόλπος Κισσάμου), and the west and south shores of Chania Bay (Kolpos Chanion Κόλπος Χανίων). It is bordered by Kissamos (5) to the west, Kantanos-Selino (4) to the south, Chania (1) to the east, and Sfakia (7) in the southeast. Its northeast region is the Rodopos Peninsula (Chersonisos Rodopou Χερσόνησος Ροδωπού).

== Historical population ==
Year	Village	Municipal unit	Municipality
1981	630	-	-
1991	719	5,044	-
2001	823	5,118	-
2011	979	5,275	16,874
2021	953	4,665	15,299

== Gallery ==
Municipalities of Chania regional unit. Platanias: 6

Map of former municipality of Platanias, now the municipal unit, bordered by Voukolies on the west and Mousouroi on the east
