= Chania (regional unit) =

Chania Περιφερειακή ενότητα Χανίων
- Regional unit
- Municipalities of Chania

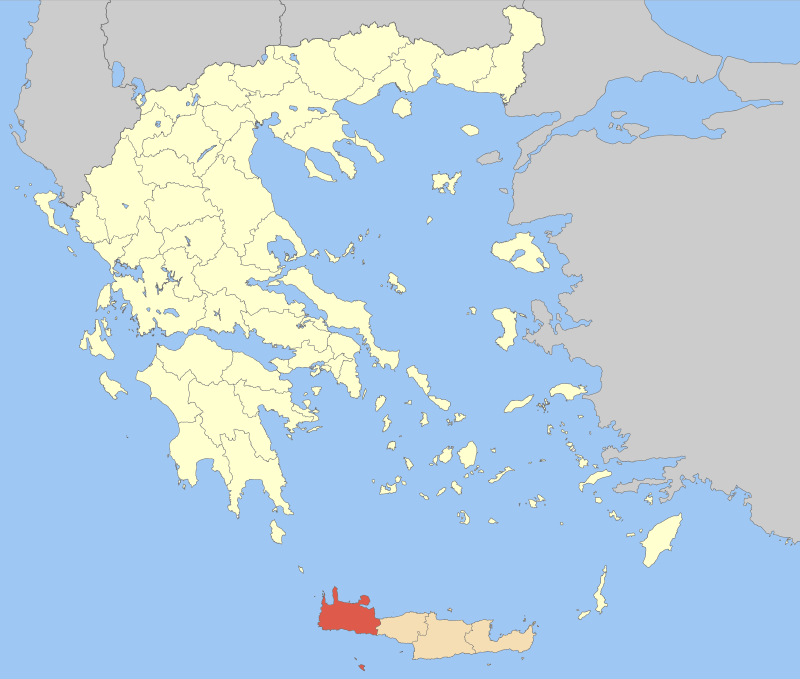
- Chania within Greece

- Location within Greece
- Coordinates: 35°25′N 23°55′E
- Country: Greece
- Administrative region: Crete
- Seat: Chania

Area
  - Total: 2,376 km^{2} (917 sq mi)

Population (2021)
  - Total: 156,706
  - Density: 65.95/km^{2} (170.8/sq mi)
- Time zone: UTC+2 (EET)
  - Summer (DST): UTC+3 (EEST)
- Postal code: 73x xx, 740 55
- Area code: 282x0, 28310
- Vehicle registration: ΧΝ
- Website: www.chania.gr

Chania (Greek: Περιφερειακή ενότητα Χανίων), also spelled Hania, is one of the four regional units of Crete; it covers the westernmost quarter of the island. Its capital is the city of Chania. Chania borders only one other regional unit: that of Rethymno to the east. The western part of Crete is bounded to the north by the Cretan Sea (part of the Aegean Sea) and to the west and south by the Mediterranean Sea and Libyan Sea. The regional unit also includes the southernmost island of Europe, Gavdos.

== Geography ==
Chania regional unit, often informally termed 'Western Crete', is a part of the island which includes the capital Chania, and the districts of Platanias and Apokoronas in the north, and Sfakia and Selino in the far south west corner. Other towns in the Chania prefecture include Hora Sfakion, Kissamos, Palaiochora, Maleme, Vryses, Vamos, Georgioupolis and Kalives.

The natural park of Samariá Gorge, a tourist attraction and a refuge for the rare Cretan wild goat or kri-kri, is in the South of the regional unit.

The White Mountains or Lefka Ori, through which the Samaria, Aradena, Imbros and other gorges run, are the limestone peaks topped by snow until May that occupy much of Chania regional unit. They contain more than 40 peaks over 2,000 meters high. The highest peak in this area is Mt Pachnes, at 2,453 meters above sea level (Crete’s second highest peak). Other prominent peaks are Mt Agkathes (1,511 m) in the eastern Lefka Ori, and Mt Agios Dikaios (1,182 m) in the far west.

The regional unit also includes three headlands, known as the "three heads" of Crete. From west to east, they are: Gramvousa peninsula (with a peak of 725 m), Rodopos peninsula (with a peak of 730 m), and Akrotiri (with a peak of 505 m). The Apokoronas region also has a prominent peak (527 m).

Western Crete is popular with tourists for its spring flowers that linger on into early May in the mountains. Birdwatching is also common, with the lammergeier and golden eagle especially sought for. As an island, Crete has many endemic species of plant and animal.

Crete's only freshwater lake, Lake Kournas, is in the regional unit close to the border with Rethymno regional unit, 47 km from Chania. It is relatively large, with a perimeter of 3.5 km. The lake used to be called 'Korisia' after ancient 'Korion', a city thought to be in the area with a temple to Athena. The lake used to be reportedly full of eels but now is better known for its terrapins and tourists. Tavernas and bicycle rental shops line part of the shore.

There are numerous rivers in the Chania region most flowing from the White Mountains to the north coast. These include, from west to east, the Tavronitis, Keritis (Iardanos), Kladissos, Koiliaris, Almiros, Delfinos and Mouselas rivers.

Chania is the regional unit of Crete that receives the most precipitation. The Exkursionsflora von Kreta by Jahn & Schoenfelder has a precipitation map and text confirming that in general, western Crete (Chania prefecture) has more precipitation than any other region on an average basis.

== Administration ==
The regional unit Chania is subdivided into seven municipalities. These are (number as in the map in the infobox):

- Apokoronas (2)
- Chania (1)
- Gavdos (3)
- Kantanos-Selino (4)
- Kissamos (5)
- Platanias (6)
- Sfakia (7)

=== Prefecture ===
The Chania prefecture (Greek: Νομός Χανίων) was created while Crete was still an autonomous state, and was preserved after the island joined Greece in 1913. As a part of the 2011 Kallikratis government reform, the Chania regional unit was created out of the former prefecture. The prefecture had the same territory as the present regional unit. At the same time, the municipalities were reorganised, according to the table below.

New municipality	Old municipalities	Seat
Apokoronas	Armenoi	Vryses
Apokoronas	Asi Gonia	Vryses
Apokoronas	Vamos	Vryses
Apokoronas	Georgioupoli	Vryses
Apokoronas	Kryonerida	Vryses
Apokoronas	Fres	Vryses
Chania	Chania	Chania
Chania	Akrotiri	Chania
Chania	Eleftherios Venizelos	Chania
Chania	Keramia	Chania
Chania	Nea Kydonia	Chania
Chania	Souda	Chania
Chania	Theriso	Chania
Gavdos	Gavdos	Gavdos
Kantanos-Selino	Kantanos	Palaiochora
Kantanos-Selino	East Selino	Palaiochora
Kantanos-Selino	Pelekanos	Palaiochora
Kissamos	Kissamos	Kissamos
Kissamos	Inachori	Kissamos
Kissamos	Mythimna	Kissamos
Platanias	Platanias	Gerani
Platanias	Voukolies	Gerani
Platanias	Kolymvari	Gerani
Platanias	Mousouroi	Gerani
Sfakia	Sfakia	Sfakia

=== Provinces ===
The provinces were:

- Apokoronas Province - Vamos
- Kissamos Province - Kissamos
- Kydonia Province - Chania
- Selino Province - Kandanos
- Sfakia Province - Chora Sfakion

== Communications ==
- Kydon TV

== Notable people ==
- Eleftherios Venizelos (1864–1936), prime minister of Greece
- Michael Bletsas, Director of Computing at the MIT Media Lab
- Constantinos Daskalakis, Assistant Professor at MIT

== See also ==
- List of settlements in the Chania regional unit
- Chania (constituency)
