= FRES =

FRES or Fres may refer to:

- Fres, a village of Crete, Greece
- Fellow of the Royal Entomological Society
- Flesch Reading Ease Score
- Forest-Range Environmental Study Ecosystems
- Future Rapid Effect System, of the British Ministry of Defense
- Fres Oquendo (born 1973), Puerto Rican heavyweight boxer

== See also ==
- FRE (disambiguation)
