= Riboflavin:NAD(P)+ oxidoreductase =

Riboflavin:NAD(P)+ oxidoreductase may refer to:

- Riboflavin reductase (NAD(P)H), a riboflavin reduction enzyme
- FMN reductase, a flavin mononucleotide reduction enzyme
