= Maza, Crete =

Maza Μάζα
- Community
- Location within Greece
- Coordinates: 35°21′26″N 24°12′48″E
- Country: Greece
- Administrative region: Crete
- Regional unit: Chania
- Municipality: Apokoronas
- Municipal unit: Kryonerida

Population (2021)
  - Community: 277
- Time zone: UTC+2 (EET)
  - Summer (DST): UTC+3 (EEST)

Maza (Greek: Μάζα) is a small village in the municipality of Apokoronas of the Chania regional unit on the island of Crete, Greece. At the time of the 2021 census, it had 104 residents (277 including the villages Fones and Champatha). The village is perched on a mountain slope some 150 m above the valley of the Boutakas (Μπούτακας) river, 1.7 km to the south of the Chania-Rethymno road.

Between the administrative reforms of 1997 and 2011, it belonged to the Kryonerida municipal unit.

== The church of St Nicholas Mazianos ==
In the central square of the village stands a church dedicated to St Nicholas, of unclear medieval date, with an interior painted in 1325/6 by Ioannis Pagomenos. The church is a single-nave barrel-vaulted structure, covered by a tiled saddle roof and ending in an apse to the east. Its dimensions are 6.67 x 4.3 m. A transverse arch divides the interior space into western and eastern bays. The builders used unworked stone, with the door jambs and lintel as the only major exception. The sole window opens into the apse. A notable decorative feature are the three glazed bowls immured in the façade, two above the entrance and the other above the roof tiles of the apse. Colourful glazed open-form ceramics used in this manner are known as bacini and in the Aegean generally date to the period of the Frankish rule.

The dedicatory inscription painted inside on the western wall identifies the artist, the date of the fresco cycle, and its sponsors. One half of the project was funded by Dimitrios Sarakinopoulos and Konstattis Raptis, the other half by Georgios Mauromatis, Konstattinos Sarakinopoulos, "all the people of the village of Maza" and the priest Michael. Pagomenos had painted the church of Panagia at nearby Alikampos ten years earlier, in 1315/6.

Since at least 2012 the key to the church has been available on request from the owner of the adjacent taverna, which boasts an olive tree 600 years old.

== Gallery ==
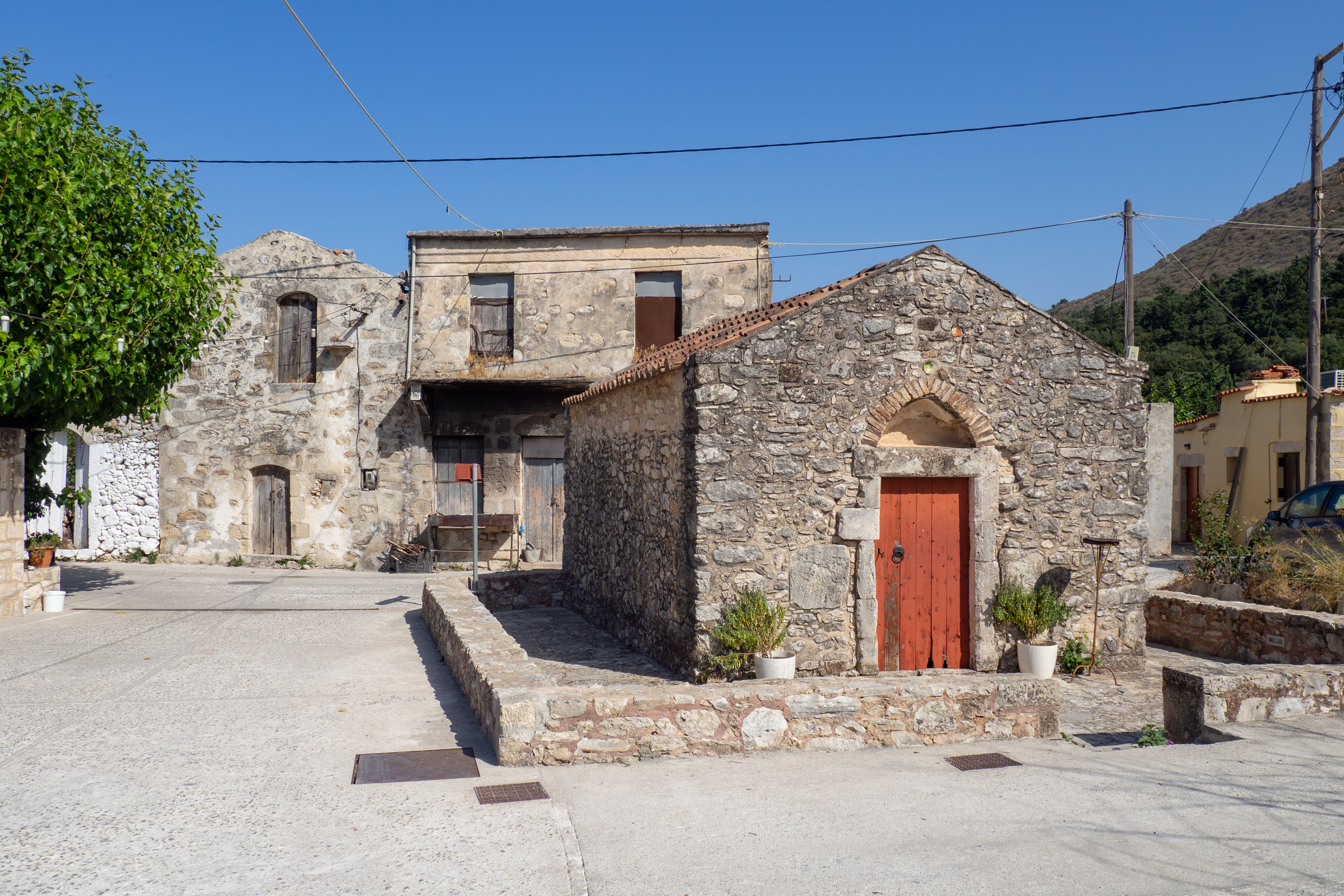
The central square of Maza with the church of St Nicholas from the west

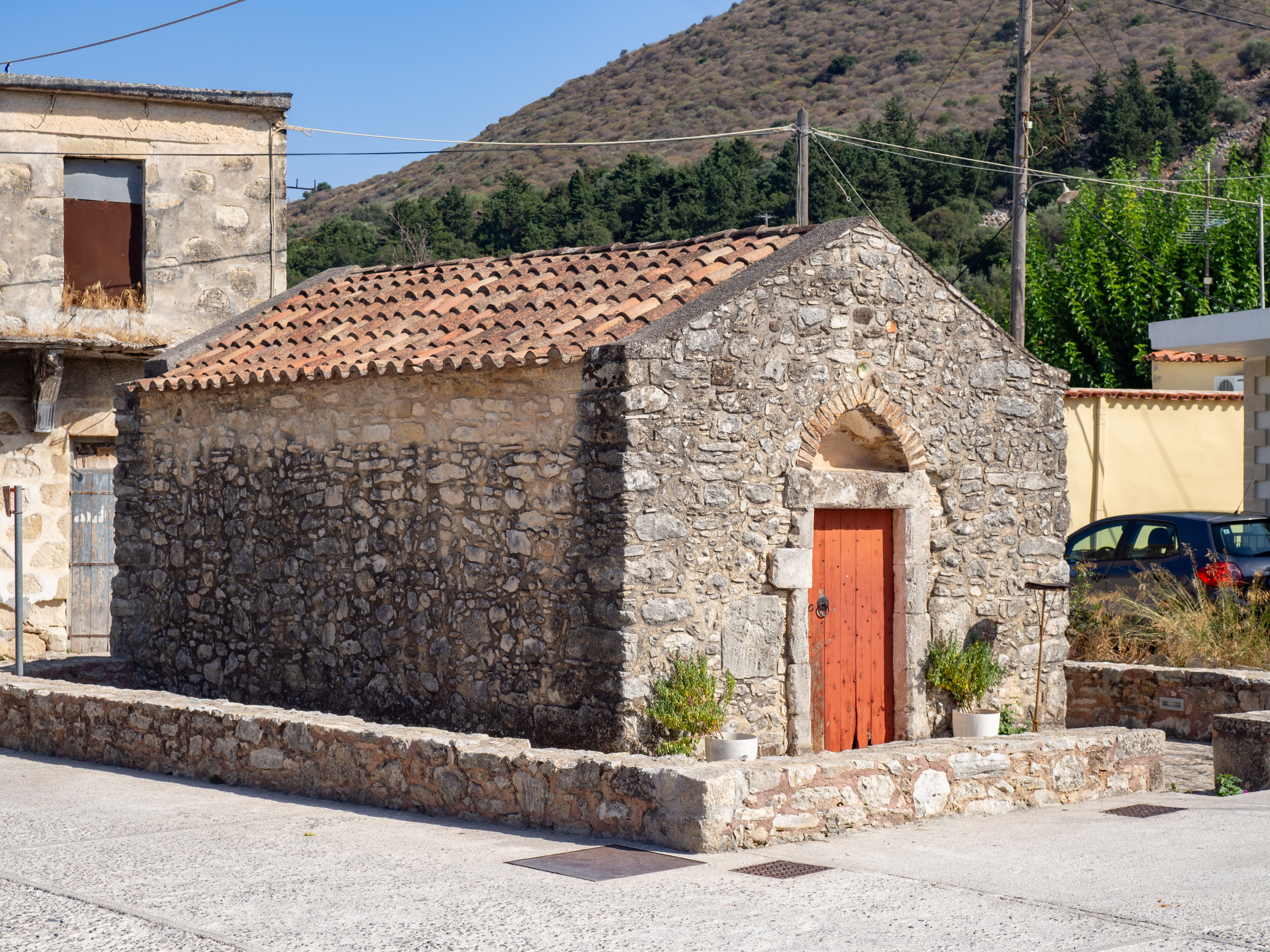
The church of St Nicholas facing north west

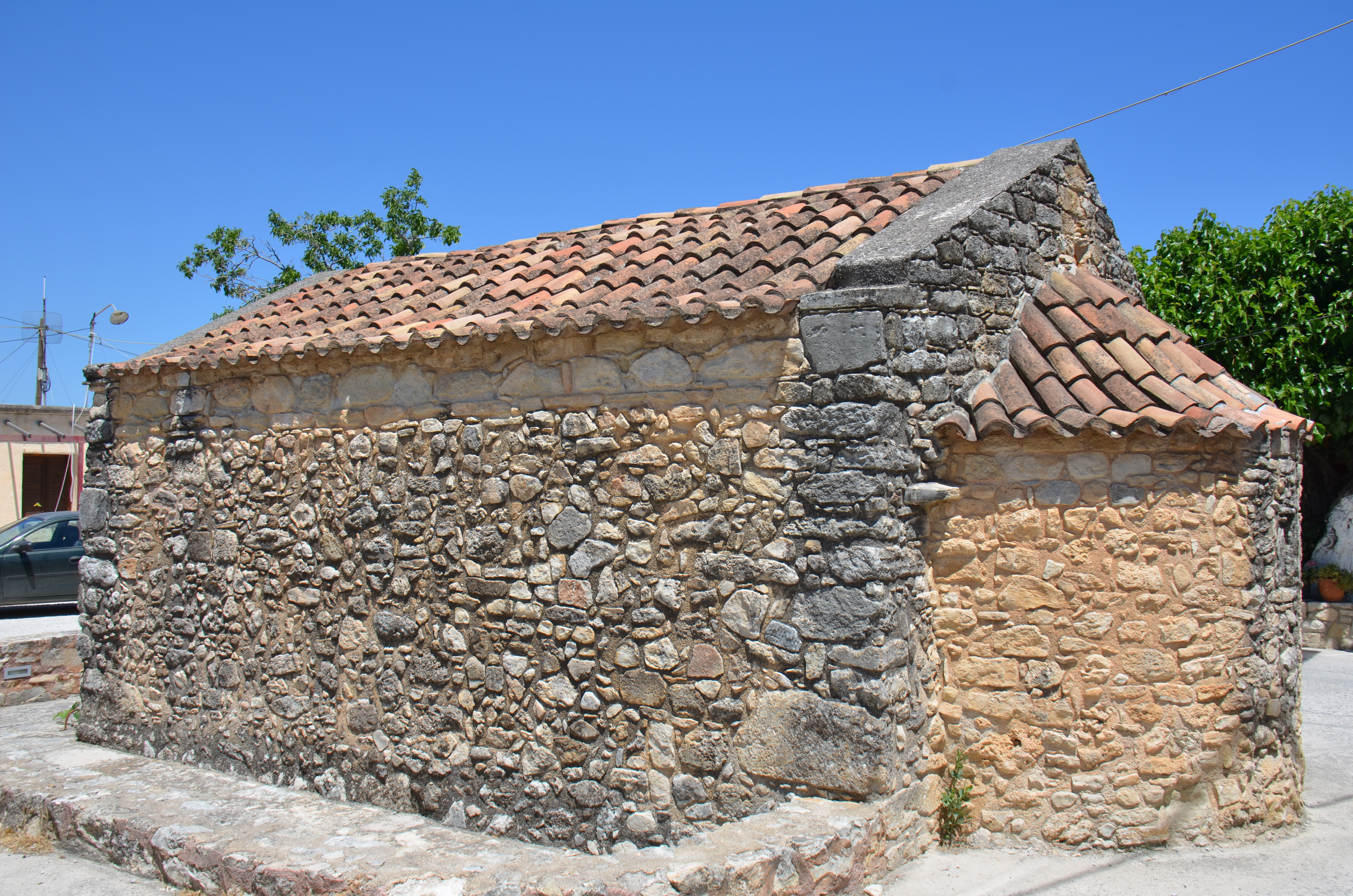
St Nicholas - exterior view of south wall and apse

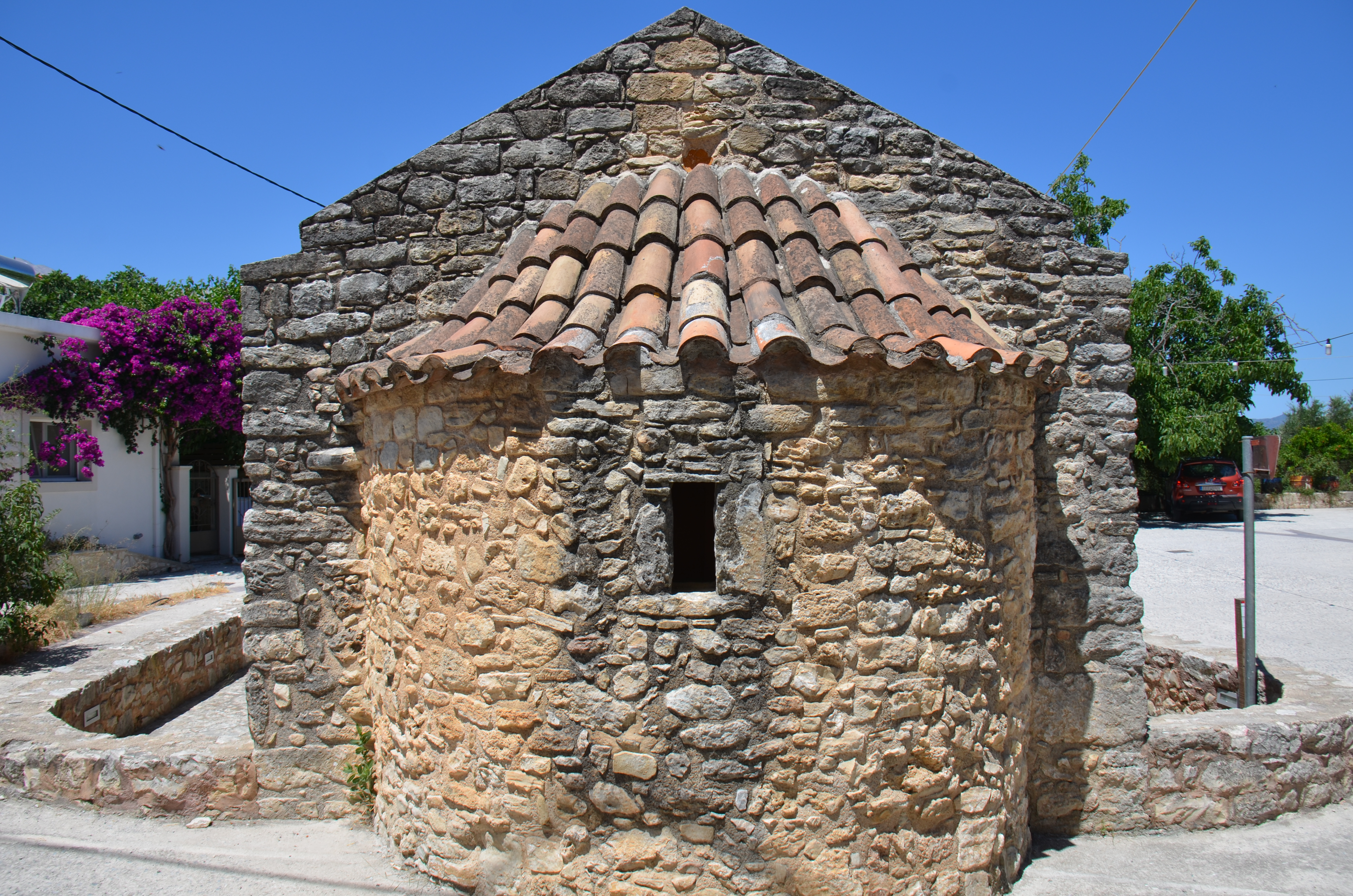
St Nicholas - the apse facing east

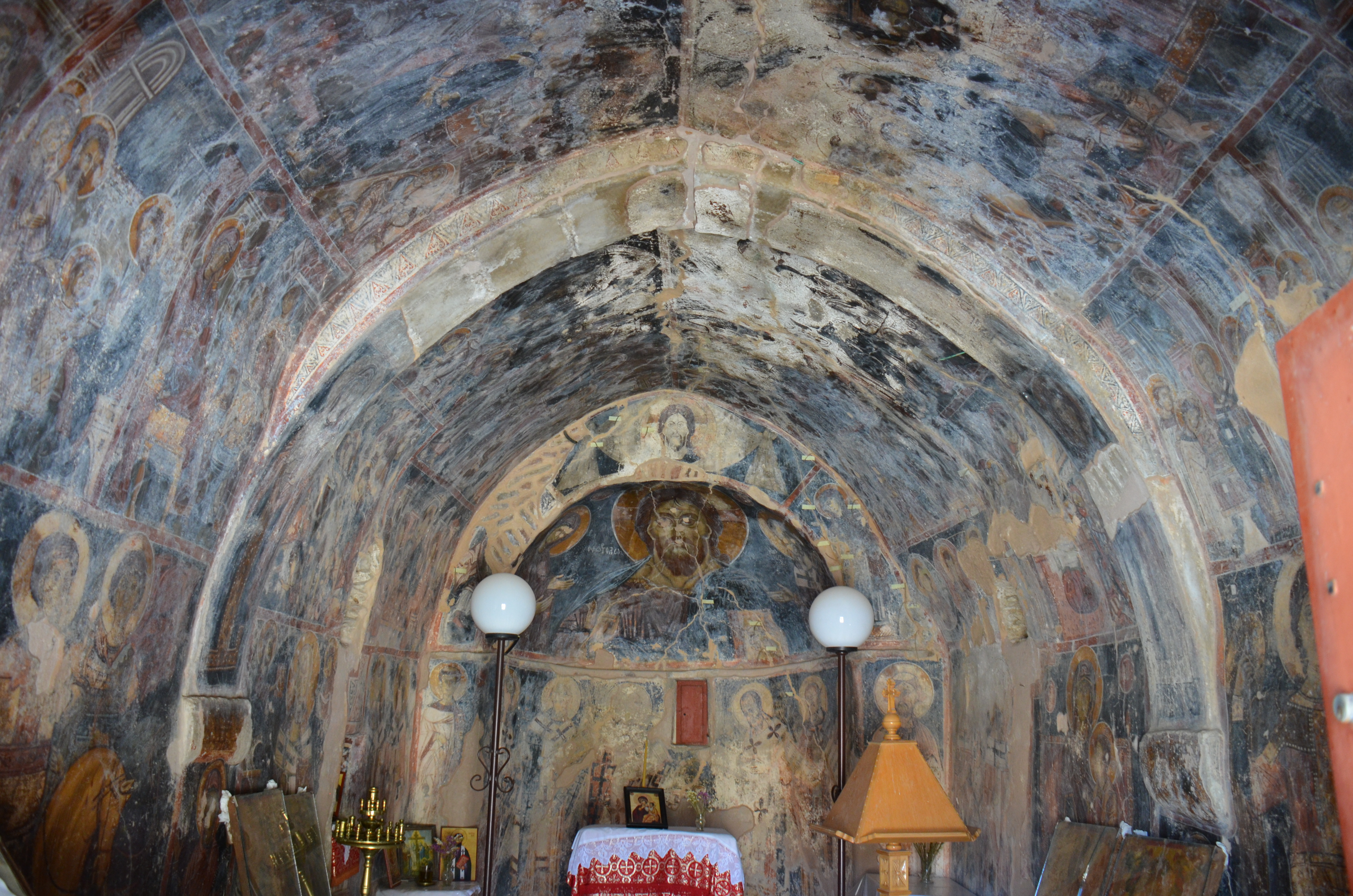
St Nicholas - the interior

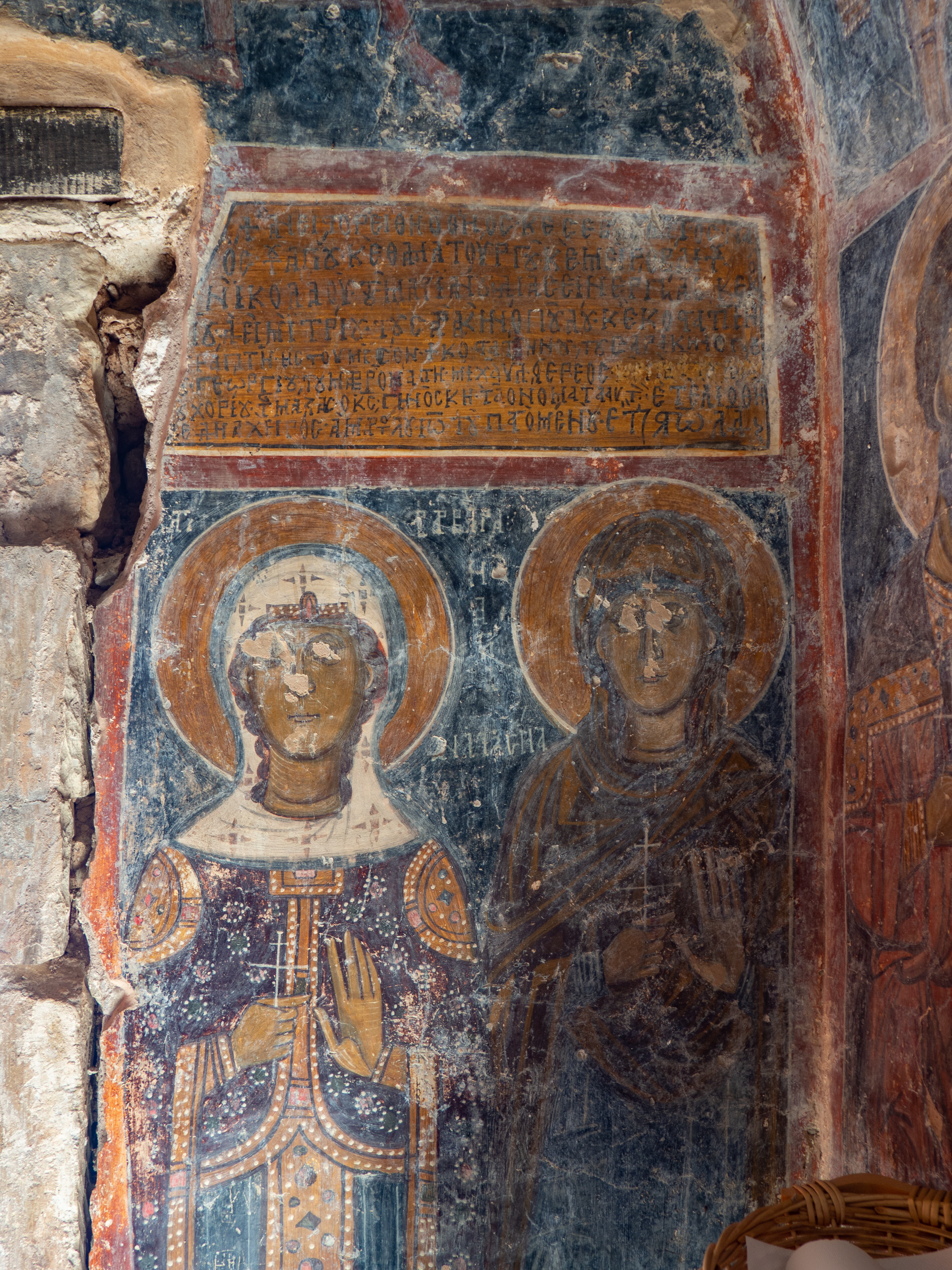
St Nicholas - fresco of St Barbara and St Anastasia and the painted inscription

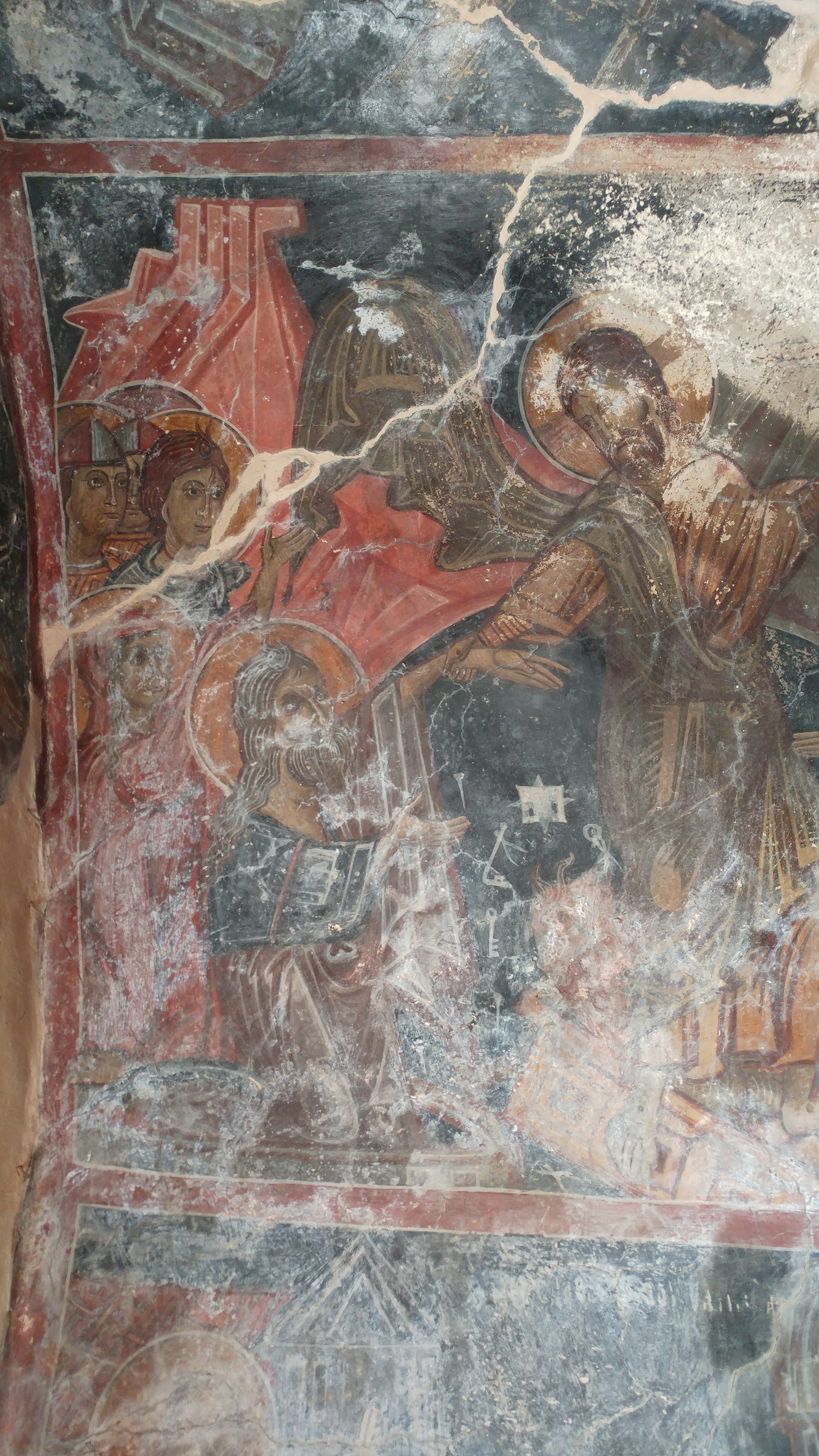
St Nicholas - fresco of the Resurrection

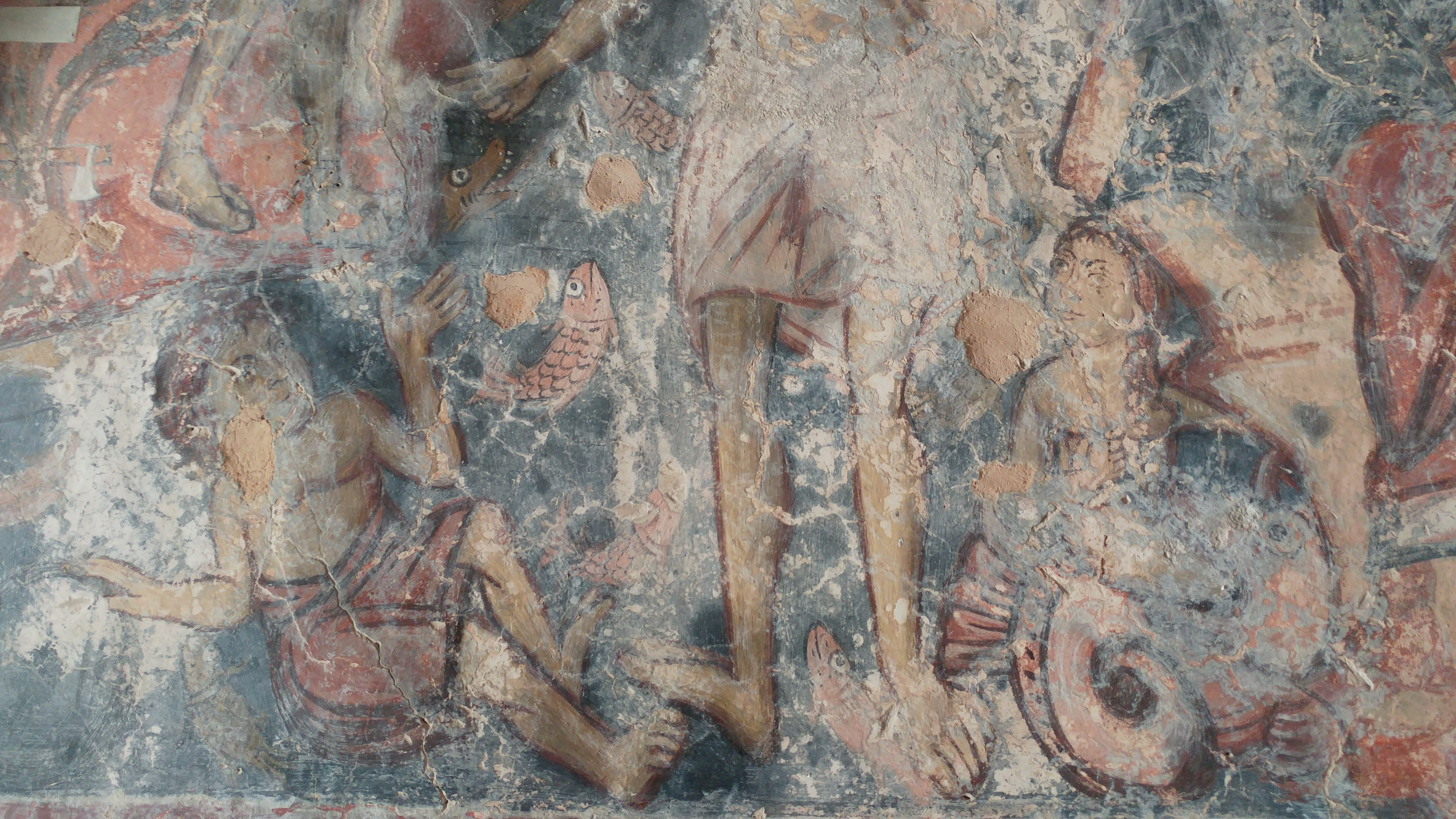
St Nicholas - fresco of the Baptism of Christ (detail)

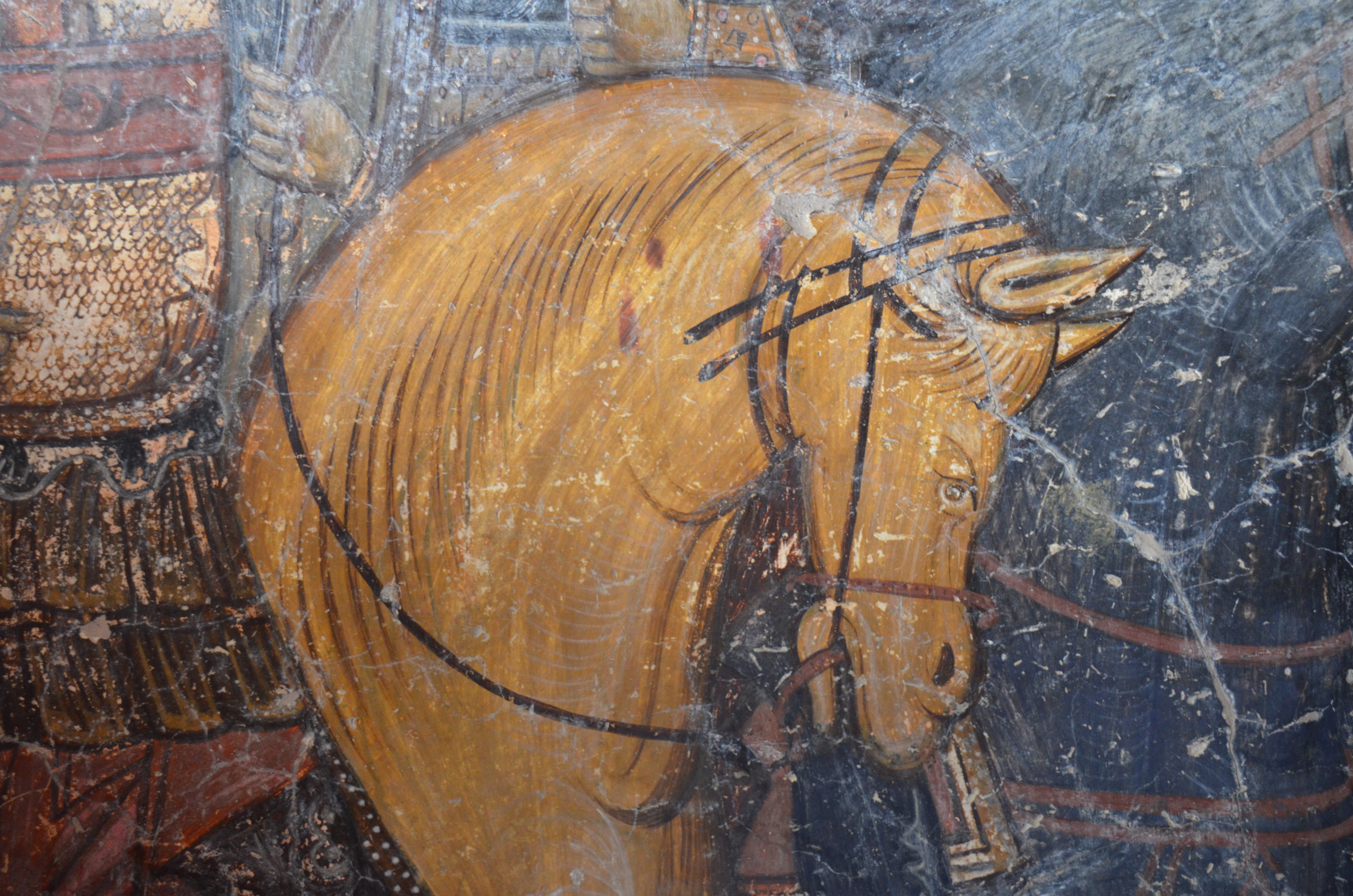
St Nicholas - fresco of St George and St Demetrius (detail)

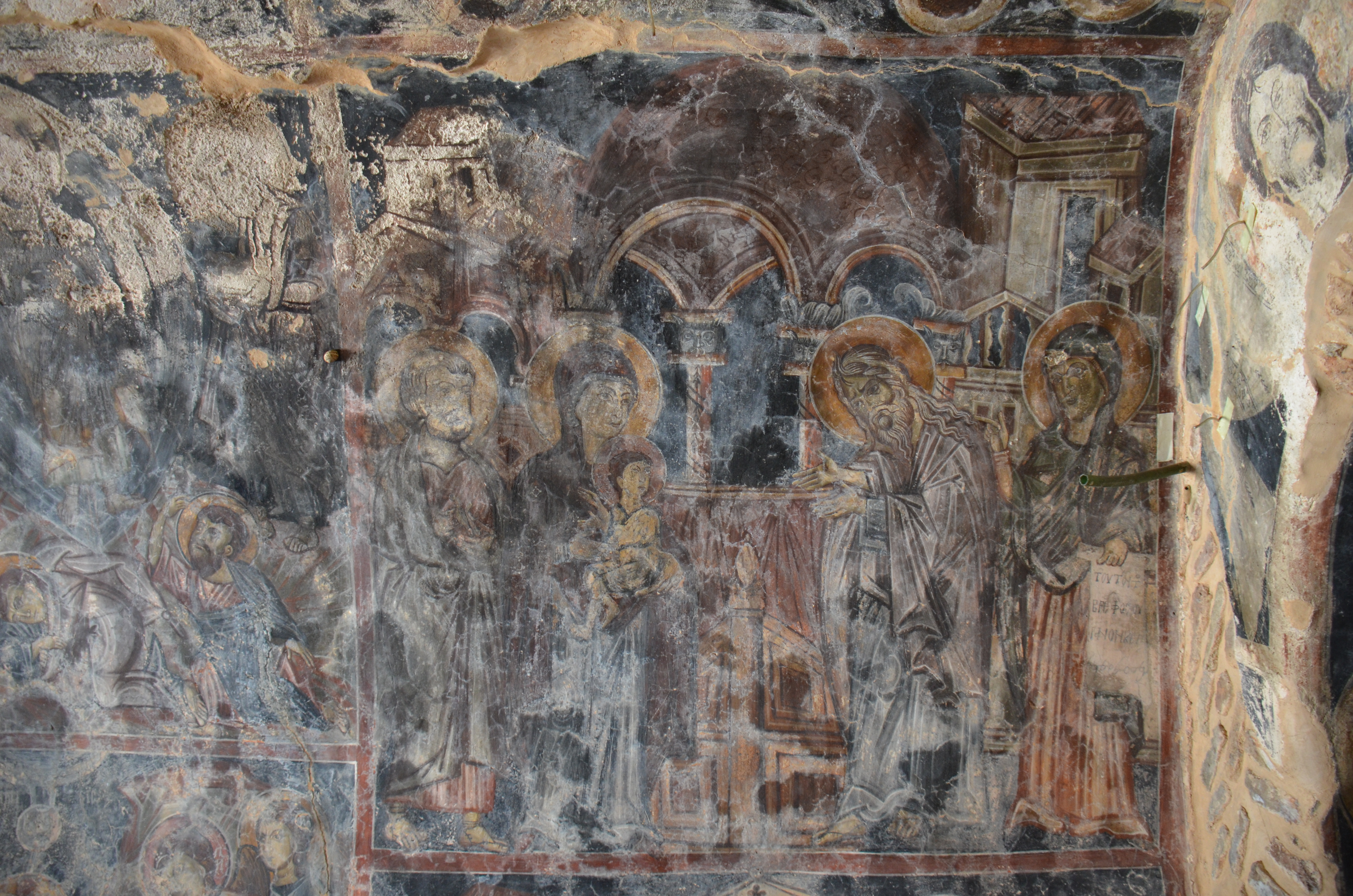
St Nicholas - fresco of the Presentation of Jesus at the Temple

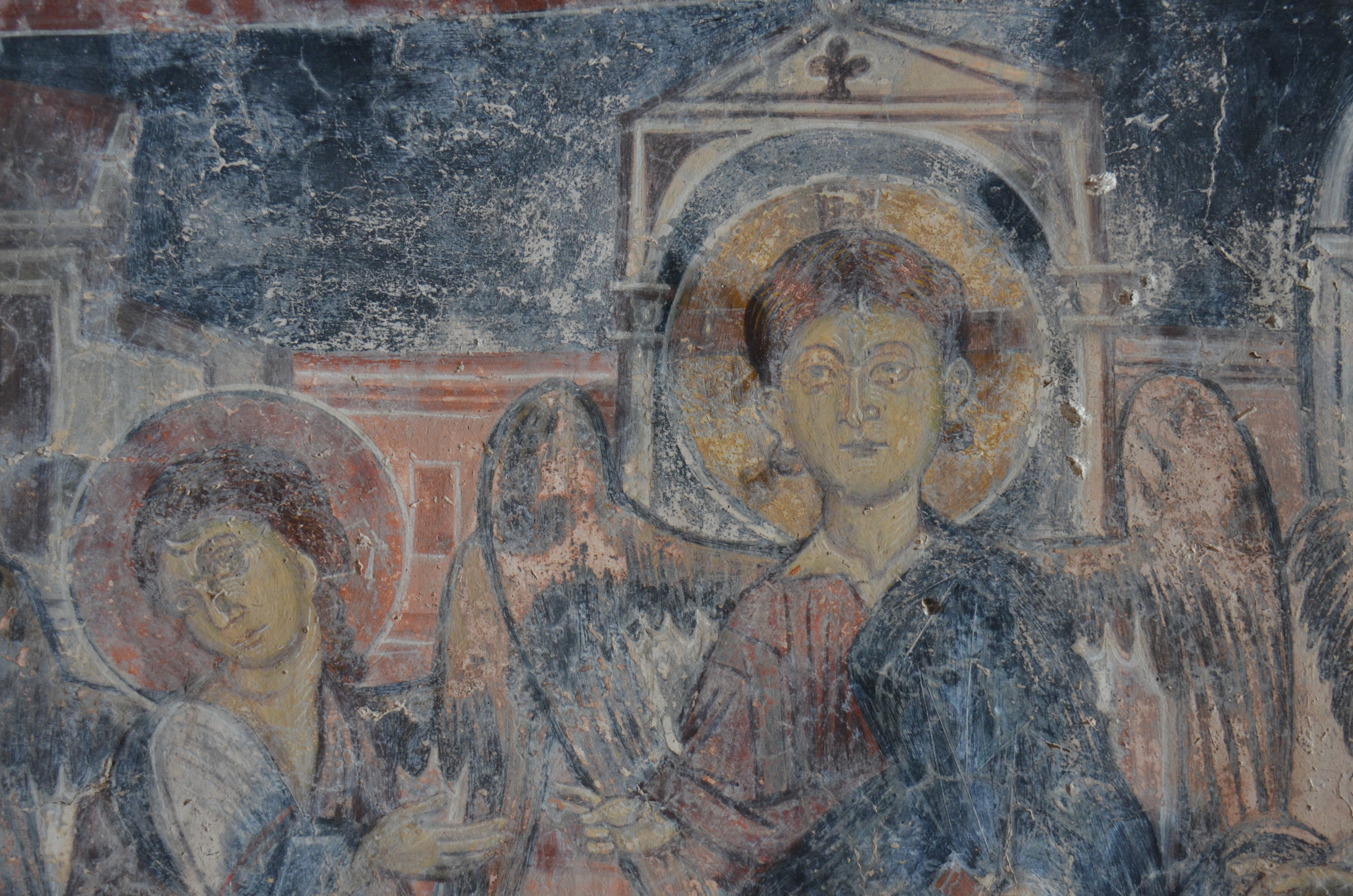
St Nicholas - fresco of the Hospitality of Abraham (detail)

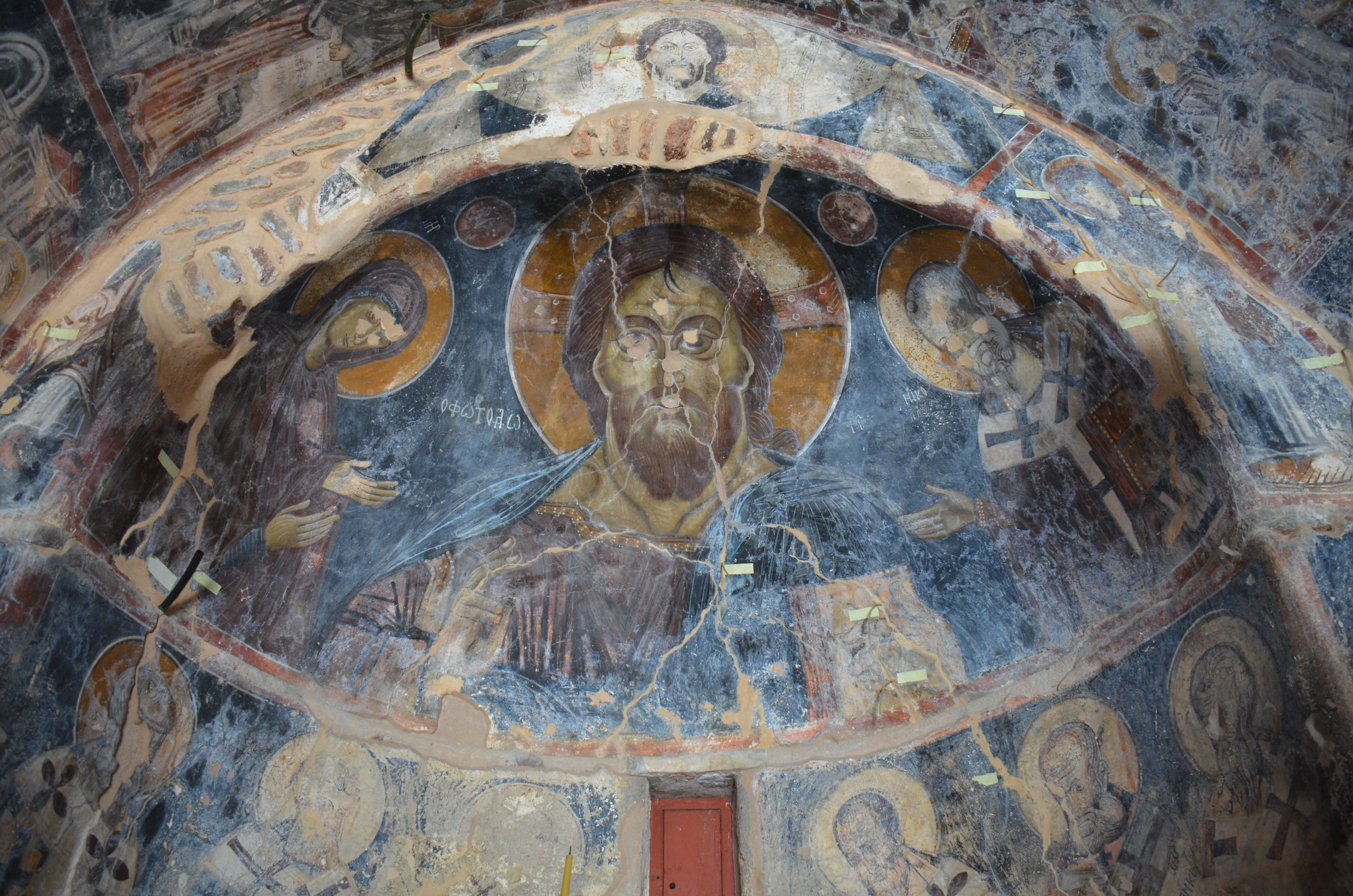
St Nicholas - fresco of the Deesis (with St Nicholas in place of St John the Baptist)

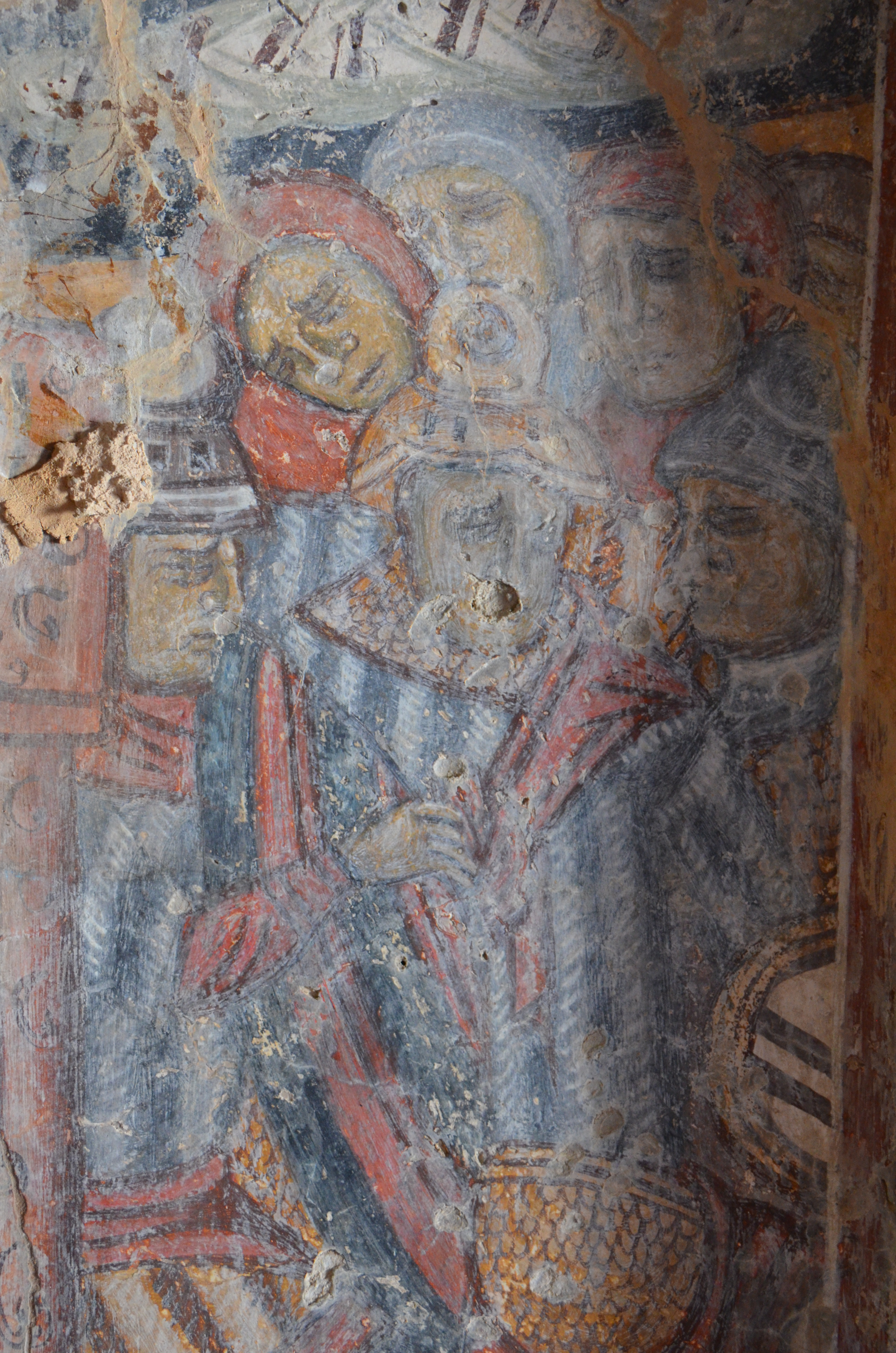
St Nicholas - fresco of the Empty Sepulchre (detail)

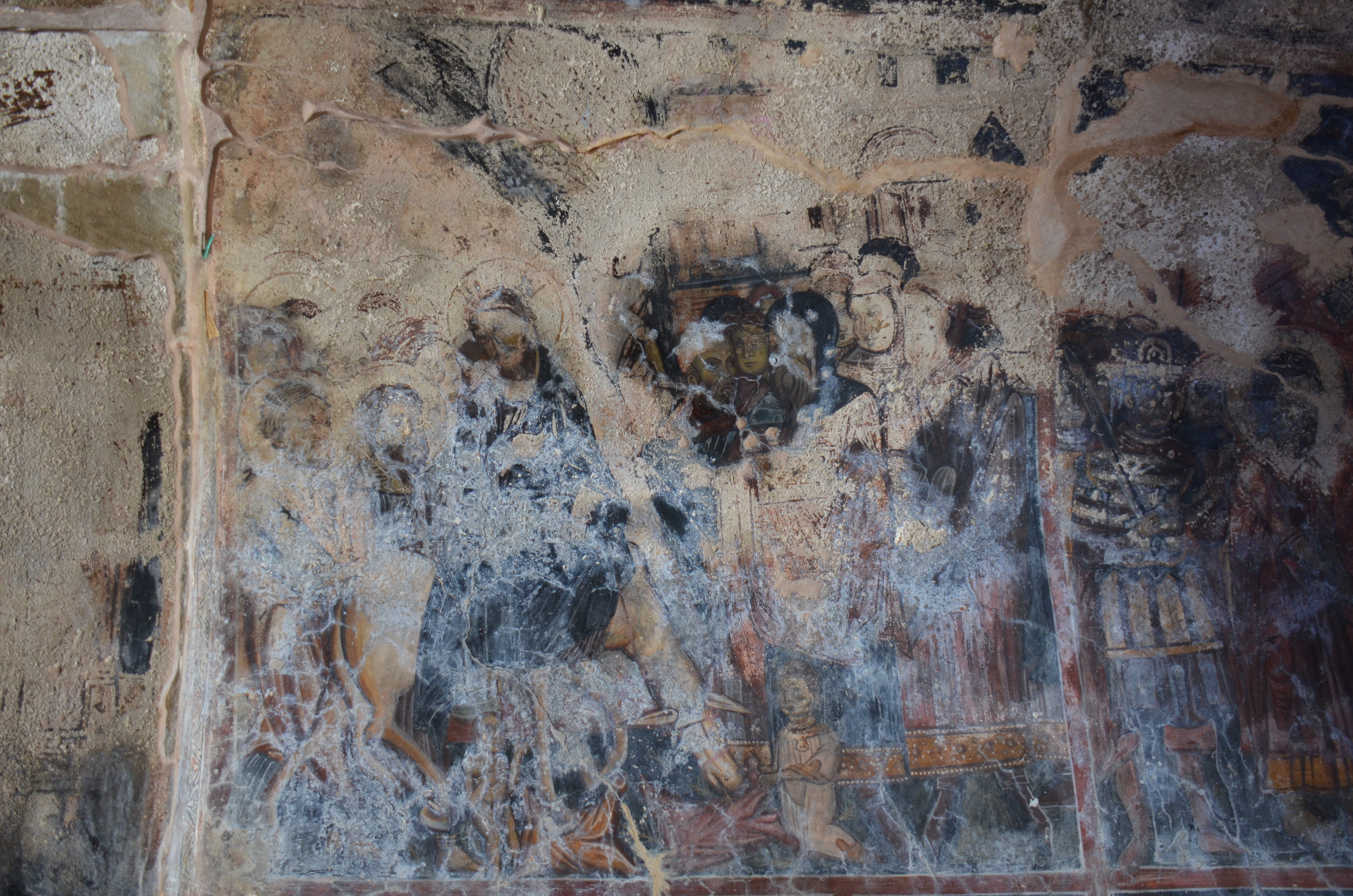
St Nicholas - fresco of the Entry into Jerusalem

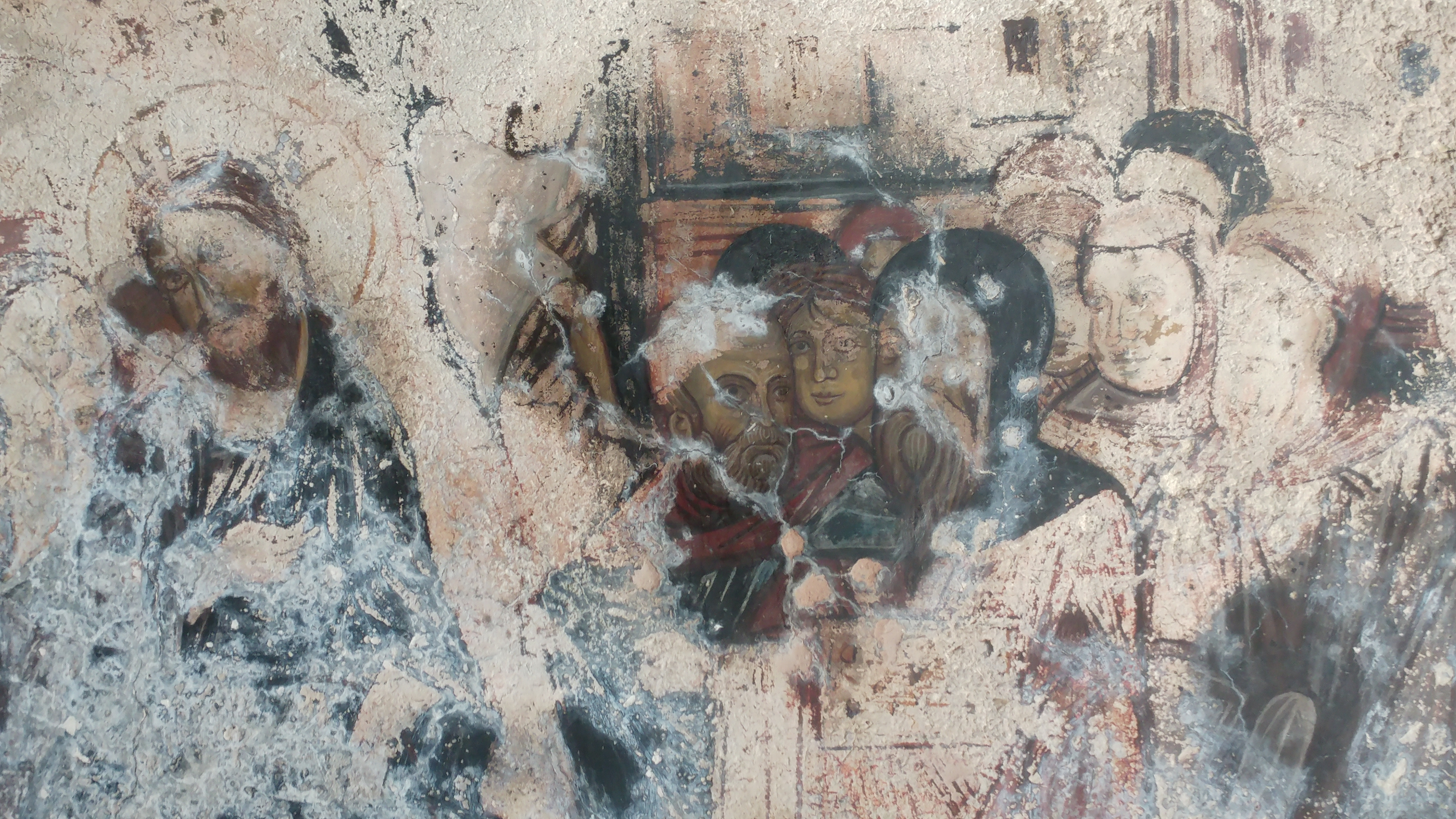
St Nicholas - fresco of the Entry into Jerusalem (detail)

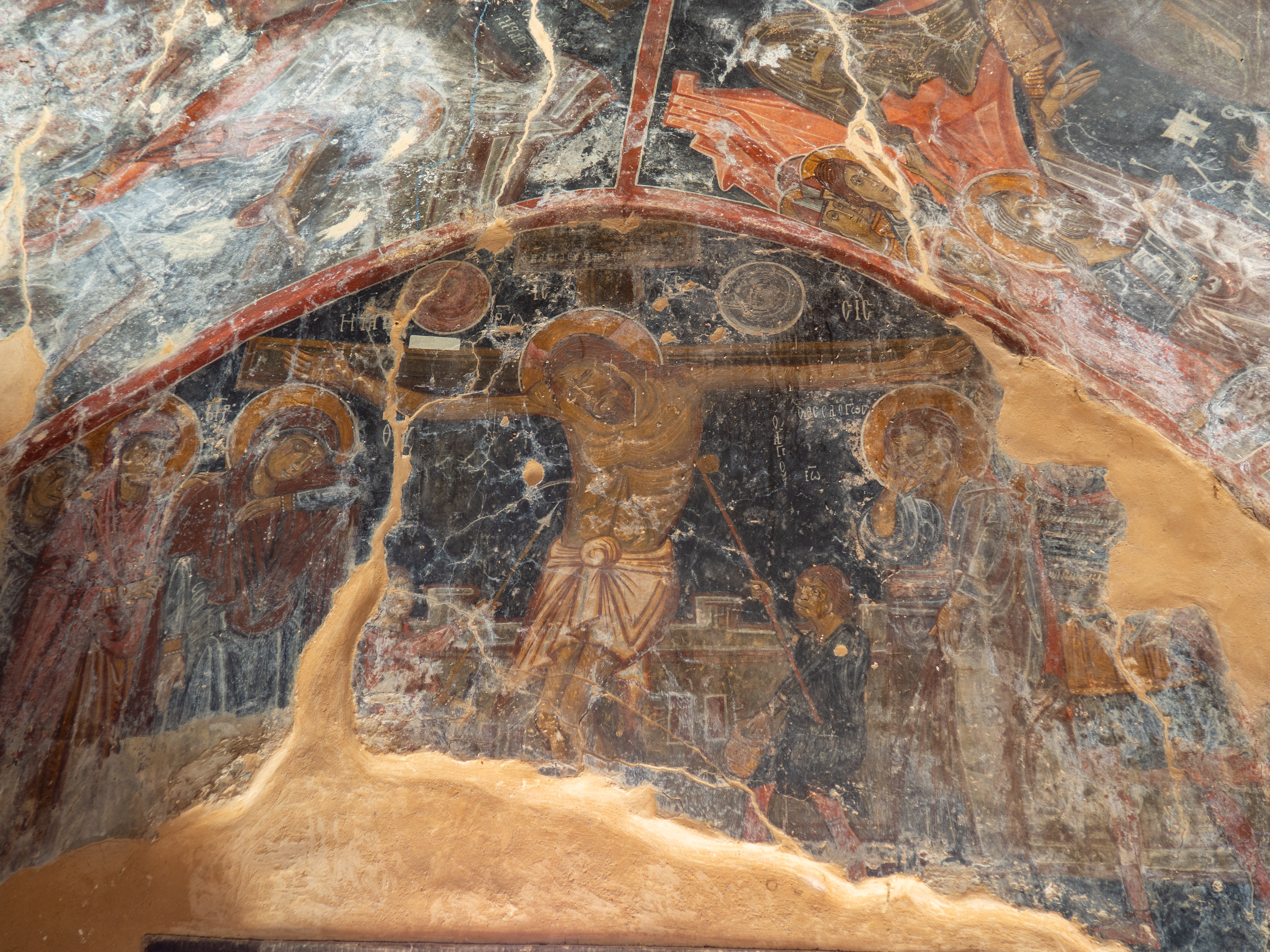
St Nicholas - fresco of the Crucifixion (above the entrance)

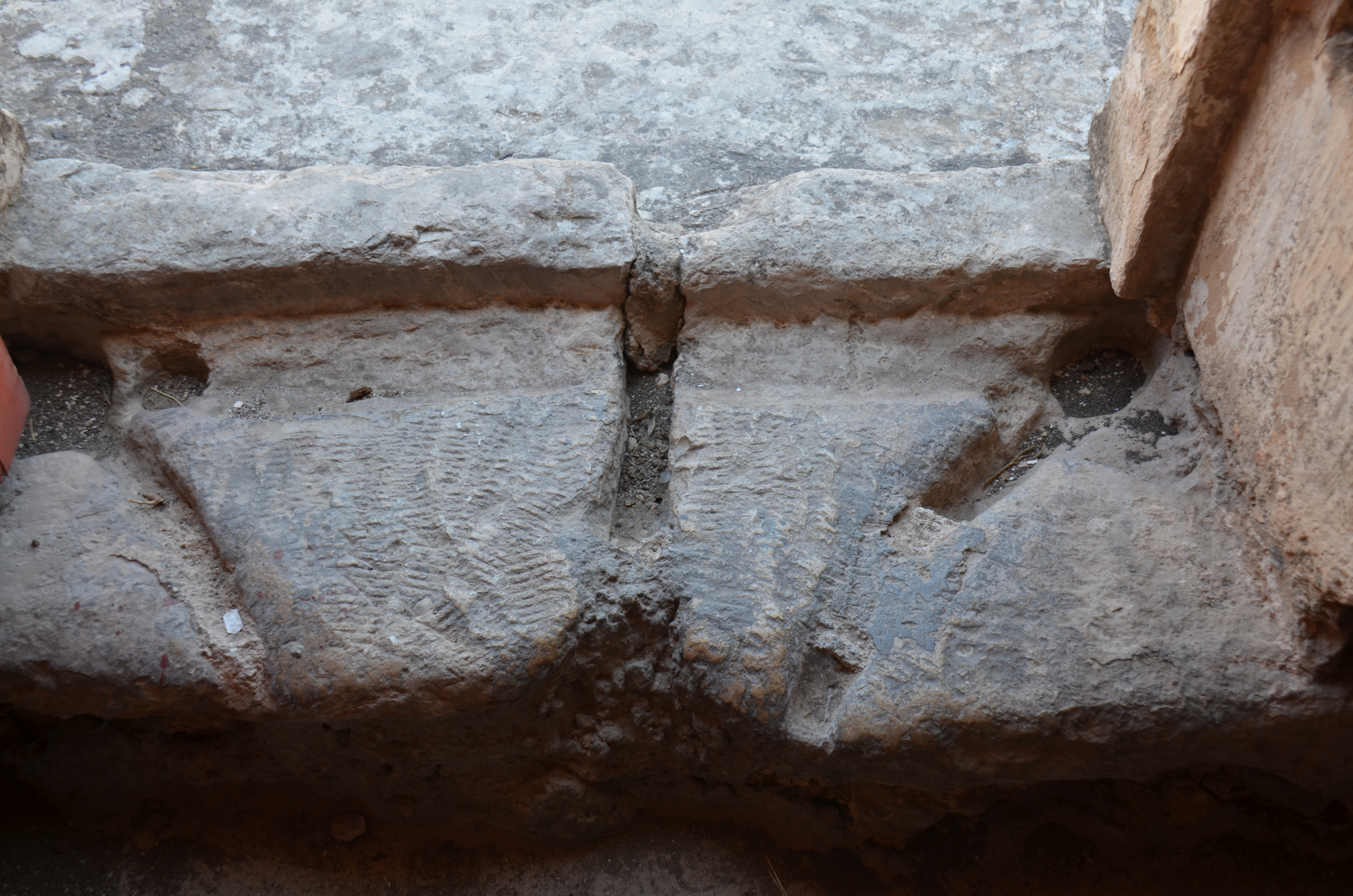
St Nicholas - the threshold piece
