= Cretan revolt (1878) =

Greek rebellion against the Ottoman Empire

Cretan revolt of 1878
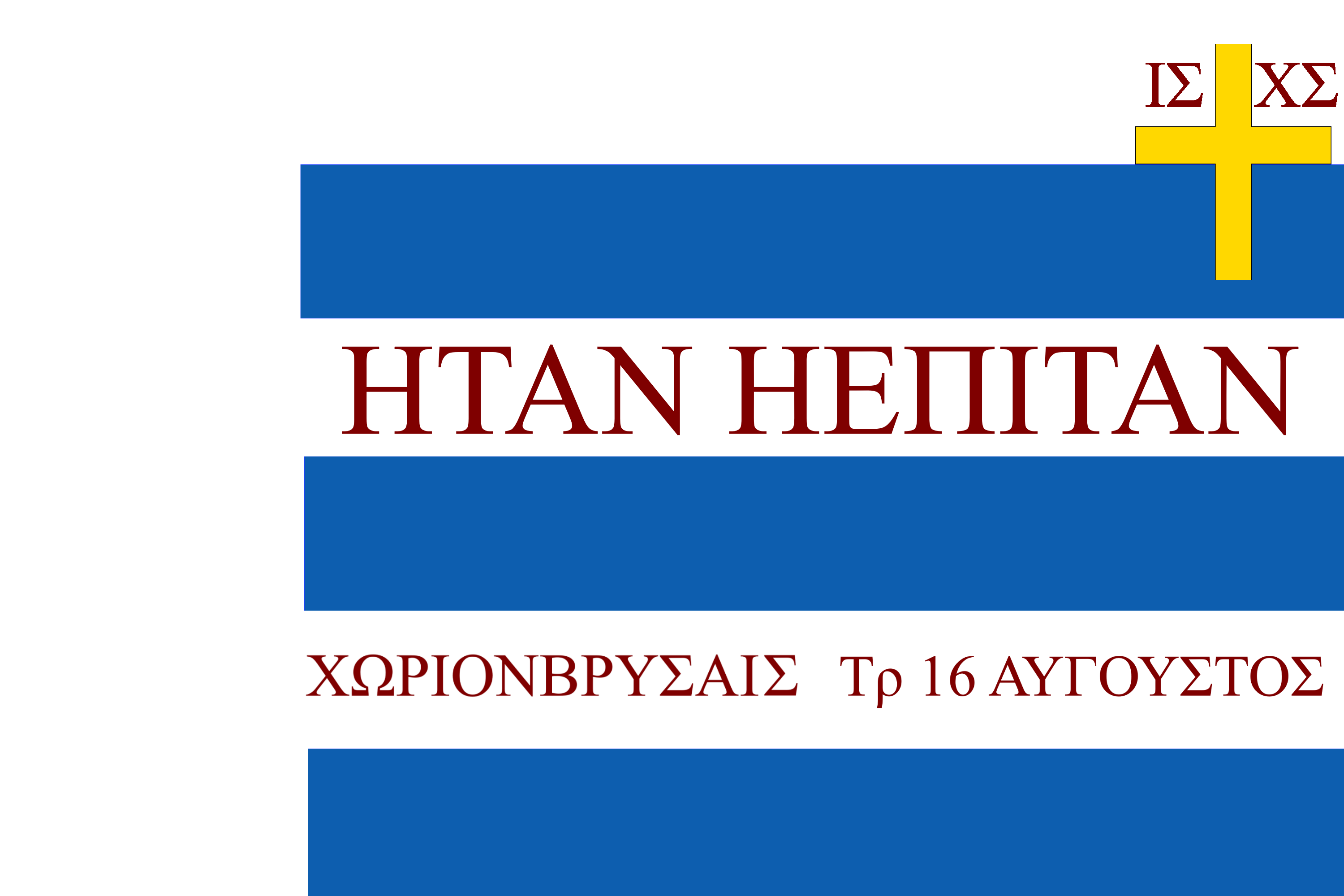
- A revolutionary flag used by Nicholaos Andreakis
Date	January – October 1878
Location	Ottoman Crete (now Crete, Greece)
Result	Cretan victory Concessions granted to the rebels

Belligerents
Greek revolutionaries Supported by: (Kingdom of Greece) Greece	Ottoman Empire

The Cretan revolt of 1878 was an insurrection of the Cretan people against the Ottoman occupation of the island. This insurrection is part of a larger movement for independence from the Ottoman Empire, which Crete was part of since the middle of the 17th century.

This conflict was marked by the Pact of Halepa which ended it and accorded a certain number of concessions to the Cretan people.

== Context ==
Beginning in 1645, the conquest of Crete by the Ottoman Empire was completed in 1669 with the end of the Siege of Candia. The Ottoman period of the history of the island was interspersed with insurrections. In 1821, Greece revolted against the Ottoman occupation, and Crete takes part in the Greek Revolution. But in 1830, in the end of the war, Crete wasn't a part of the new Greek State. The island passed under the authority of Muhammad Ali of Egypt, for the services to the Ottoman Empire in the Greek Revolution in the Peloponnese. This Egyptian parenthesis lasted no more than ten years, and in 1840, Crete returned to the authority of the Sultan. Despite a new attempt of insurrection of the Cretan people, Crete knew a period of relative peace until 1866.

On 30 March 1856, the Treaty of Paris obliged the sultan to apply the hatt-ı hümayun, that is to say the civil and religious equality of Christians and Muslims. The Ottoman authorities in Crete were reluctant to carry out these reforms. After the many conversions of Muslims (mostly old Christians who had converted to Islam and therefore relapses), the Empire tried to return to the liberty of conscience.

The four following decades (until the independence in 1898), the revolts just follow the path opened by the hatt-ı hümayun.

The Cretan Revolt of 1866–1869 made advances for the Cretan people. On 11 November 1867, Ali proposed a new administrative project, the "Organic Law", with a certain number of privileges, notably a limited representation of the Cretan element in the administration of the island, tax breaks, the establishment of a bank and the full equivalence of two languages, Greek and Turkish.

The international events that destabilised the Balkans (revolts of Bosnia-Herzegovina in 1875 and of Bulgaria in 1876, intervention of Serbia and Montenegro on the side of the rebels) came to add to the ambient atmosphere. These movements encouraged the Christian community of Crete to demand reforms. A volition that was amplified while in 1875, the majority of the Christian representatives of the assembly weren't rural, but the doctors and the lawyers were often from the University of Athens. The Cretan assembly forwarded to the Sultan, on 22 May 1876, a series of complaints whose the best representation of Christians in the assembly. On 2 August, the Porte made publicly obvious its denial to accede to all of the complaints, of the foundation of a bank, the establishment of an obligatory public school and the right to publish newspapers.

Another cause of the uprising of 1878 was the outbreak of the Russo-Turkish War in 1877. The start of war of Russia against the Ottoman Empire was viewed as an opportunity for the Cretan people to revolt.

== Revolt of 1878 ==
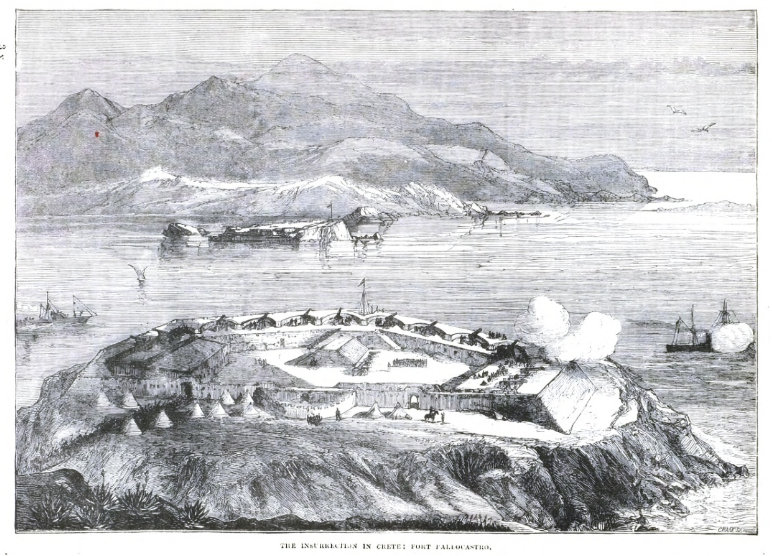
Insurrection in Crete: Fort Faleocastro (Cassell's Illustrated History of the Russo-Turkish War, Part 2, 1890)

Despite the concessions accorded on August 1876, the anger rose among the population. The first armed bands started reuniting in the mountains. The Ottoman administration tried to put a halt to this protestation movement by its root by arresting the deputy of Chania, and one of the emblematic figures of the Christian community. This event was the cause of the first manifestation of the history of Crete, facing the residence of the governor of the island.

In July 1877, a committee of 44 members was elected in the west of the island in order to treat the Cretan question. Three revolutionary committees were organised in Vamos, Chania and Rethymno and were supplied in arms from Athens. On August, a post-revolutionary committee was elected in Chania. The representatives of all these committees were reunited in Fres with the goal of electing a Presidium.

With the conflict turning out against the Ottoman Empire, Greece chose to accentuate its support in Crete. Charilaos Trikoupis, then minister of foreign affairs in the government of Koumoundouros, announced on 27 December the support of Greece in case of revolt.

That was the moment the chiefs of the Cretan war in exile chose to return to the island. Among them, we find Hatzimichalis Giannaris, hero of the Cretan Revolt of 1866–1869, then exiled in Russia, followed by the leaders of the clans of western of Crete. The pan-Cretan revolutionary assembly was reunited in Fres in January 1878.

The Ottoman Empire, involved in its conflict against Russia, couldn't intervene in a significant way in Crete. It preferred to follow the advice of Great Britain and send two emissaries to the island to negotiate with the insurgents. These emissaries were Kostis Adosidis Pasha, old governor of the province of Lasithi, and the Cretan Turk Selim Efendi. Ioannis Tsouderos was in charge of responding to these emissaries, a response that had to include two requirements: the declaration of autonomy of Crete which would pay a tribute to the Sultan, and the election of a governor of Crete of Christian denomination and whose election would be supervised by the Great Powers. The emissaries demanded a delay of ten days to obtain a response of the Sultan. The delay expired without any response.

So the revolt escalated, at first in the west of Crete in mid-January, then in the rest of the island. Like in the preceding revolts, the Turks abandoned the countryside to defend the fortified cities. In mid-March, the rebels controlled the rest of the island, with the exception of strongholds of Ierapetra, Spinalonga, Heraklion, Rethymno, Izzedin, Chania, Kissamos and Gramvousa that couldn't be taken without heavy artillery.

The defeat of the Ottoman Empire by Russia had important consequences for Crete. In July 1878, the consuls of the great powers insisted on establishing a cease-fire, promising that the case of Crete would be discussed at the Congress of Berlin. The Cretan assembly decided to send two representatives to Berlin, what Greece wanted to avoid, suspecting that the Cretans would prefer to negotiate autonomy rather than the union with Greece.

Finally, the great powers imposed nothing more than the return at the concessions of 1866. Unsatisfied, the Cretans maintained the armed struggle. But the difficulties of resupplying, particularly resupplying food, created strife between the leaders of the Cretan clans.

== Pact of Halepa ==
The Ottoman Empire, satisfied knowing the idea of union of Crete with Greece was rejected by the European Powers, accepted to make concessions towards the Cretan population. On October 1878, the Pact of Halepa put an end to the insurrection. This treaty took the name of the contemporary district of Halepa, in Chania.

The Pact of Halepa transformed Crete into a semi-autonomous province with specific privileges. Ratified by a firman of the Sultan on 9 November 1878, the main measures of the treaty were:

- The election of a Christian as a general governor of the island for a duration of 5 years, renewable
- The nomination of a counsellor beside the governor of different denomination from the governor
- The election of an parliamentary assembly of 80 members (49 Christians, 31 Muslims)
- The creation of a Cretan Gendarmerie;
- The recognition of Greek as an official language in the courts and the assembly
- The guarantee of a general amnesty
- A temporary tax exemption
- The authorisation of the maintenance of the association, of the creation of literary circles and of the publication of newspapers

The constitution accorded by the Pact of Halepa can't, in law, be modified by the Ottoman constitution. The first governor was Alexander Karatheodori Pasha.

== Sources ==
- Theocharis Detorakis, History of Crete, Heraklion, 1994
- Paschalis Mitrokilides, Eleftherios Venizelos, the trials of Statesmanship, Edinburgh university press, 2008
