= Kryonerida =

Kryonerida Κρυονερίδα
- Municipal unit
- Location within the regional unit

- Location within Greece
- Coordinates: 35°20′N 24°12′E
- Country: Greece
- Administrative region: Crete
- Regional unit: Chania
- Municipality: Apokoronas

Area
  - Municipal unit: 67.6 km^{2} (26.1 sq mi)
- Elevation: 184 m (604 ft)

Population (2021)
  - Municipal unit: 2,068
  - Municipal unit density: 30.6/km^{2} (79.2/sq mi)
- Time zone: UTC+2 (EET)
  - Summer (DST): UTC+3 (EEST)
- Postal code: 730 07
- Area code: 28250
- Vehicle registration: ΧΝ

Kryonerida (Greek: Κρυονερίδα) is a former municipality in the Chania regional unit, Crete, Greece. Since the 2011 local government reform it is part of the municipality Apokoronas, of which it is a municipal unit. The municipal unit has an area of 67.561 km^{2} (26.085 sq mi). The seat of the municipality of Kryonerida was the large village of Vryses. Vryses became the seat of the new municipality Apokoronas. It is located in foothills of the White Mountains (Lefka Ori).

== Subdivisions ==
The municipal unit Kryonerida is subdivided into the following communities (constituent villages in brackets):

- Vryses (Vryses, Metochi, Filippos)
- Alikampos
- Vafes (Vafes, Arevitis, Achatzikia)
- Emprosneros (Emprosneros, Vatoudiaris)
- Nippos
- Maza (Maza, Fones, Champatha)

== See also ==
- List of settlements in the Chania regional unit
