= Nipos =

Village in Crete, Greece

Nipos Νίπος
- Community
- Location within Greece
- Coordinates: 35°22′48″N 24°10′15″E
- Country: Greece
- Administrative region: Crete
- Regional unit: Chania
- Municipality: Apokoronas
- Municipal unit: Kryonerida

Population (2021)
  - Community: 175
- Time zone: UTC+2 (EET)
  - Summer (DST): UTC+3 (EEST)

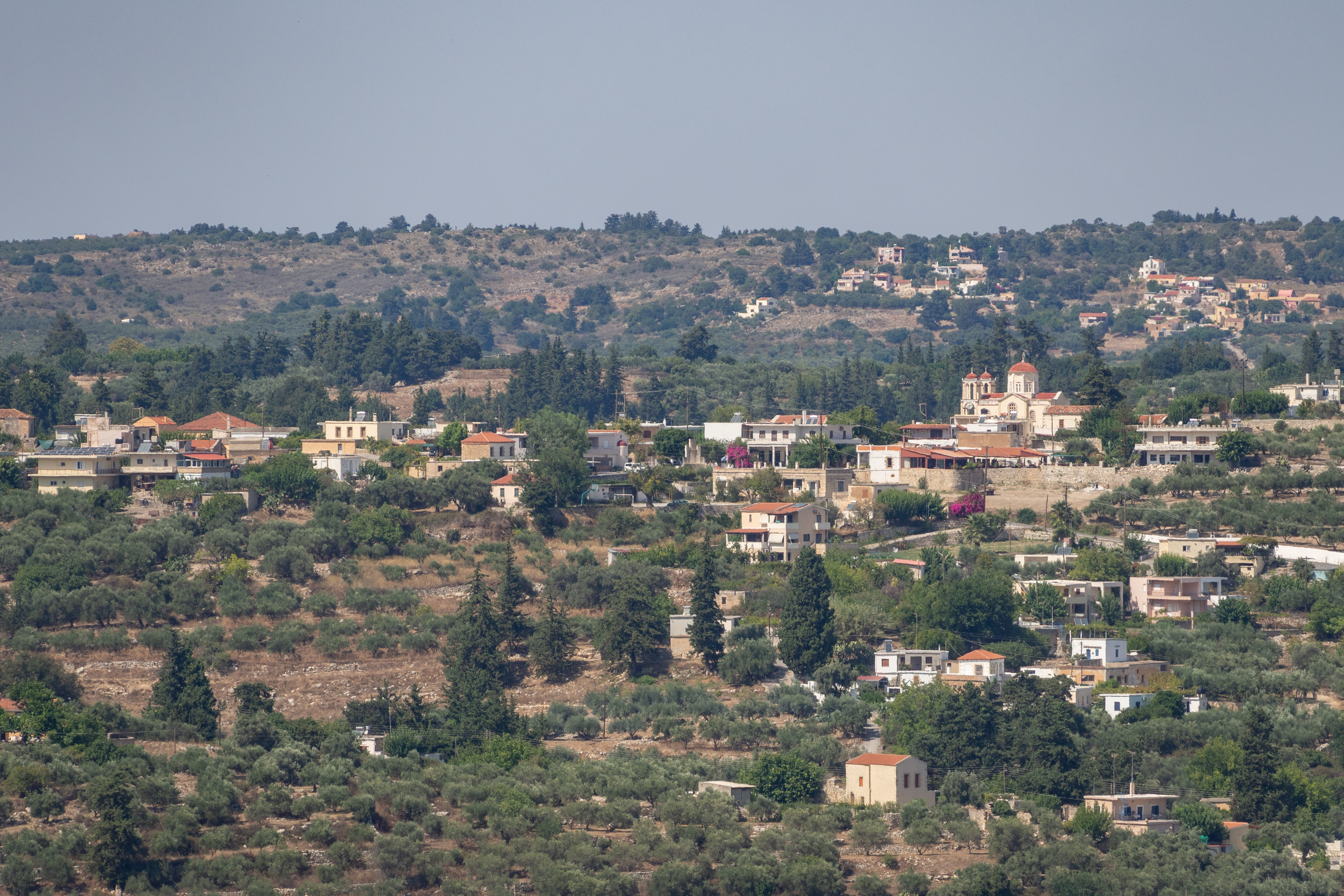
View of Nipos, Crete, from Vafes, a village located to the South of Nipos.

Nipos (Greek: Νίπος) or Nippos (Greek: Νίππος) is a village in Chania regional unit and is 33 km away from the city of Chania. It is part of the municipality of Apokoronas.
