= FRE =

FRE or Fre may refer to:

- Pedro Fré (1924–2014), Brazilian Roman Catholic bishop
- Fré Cohen (1903–1943), Dutch artist
- Federal Rules of Evidence in the United States
- Fleet Ready Escort, a Royal Navy deployment
- Flesch Reading Ease, a readability test
- Formula Regional European Championship (FRE championship), a Formula 3 regional racing league
- FRE Records, a Canadian record label
- Freeplay Energy, a British electronic manufacturer
- Freedom Air (Guam), a defunct airline of Guam, ICAO code FRE
- FRE margin, operating income on fee-related earnings
- Freeport station (Maine), Amtrak code FRE
- The ISO 639-2 code for the French language
- Freshfield railway station, in England
- Riboflavin reductase (NAD(P)H), an enzyme
