= Vryses =

Village in Crete, Greece

Vryses Βρύσες
- Community
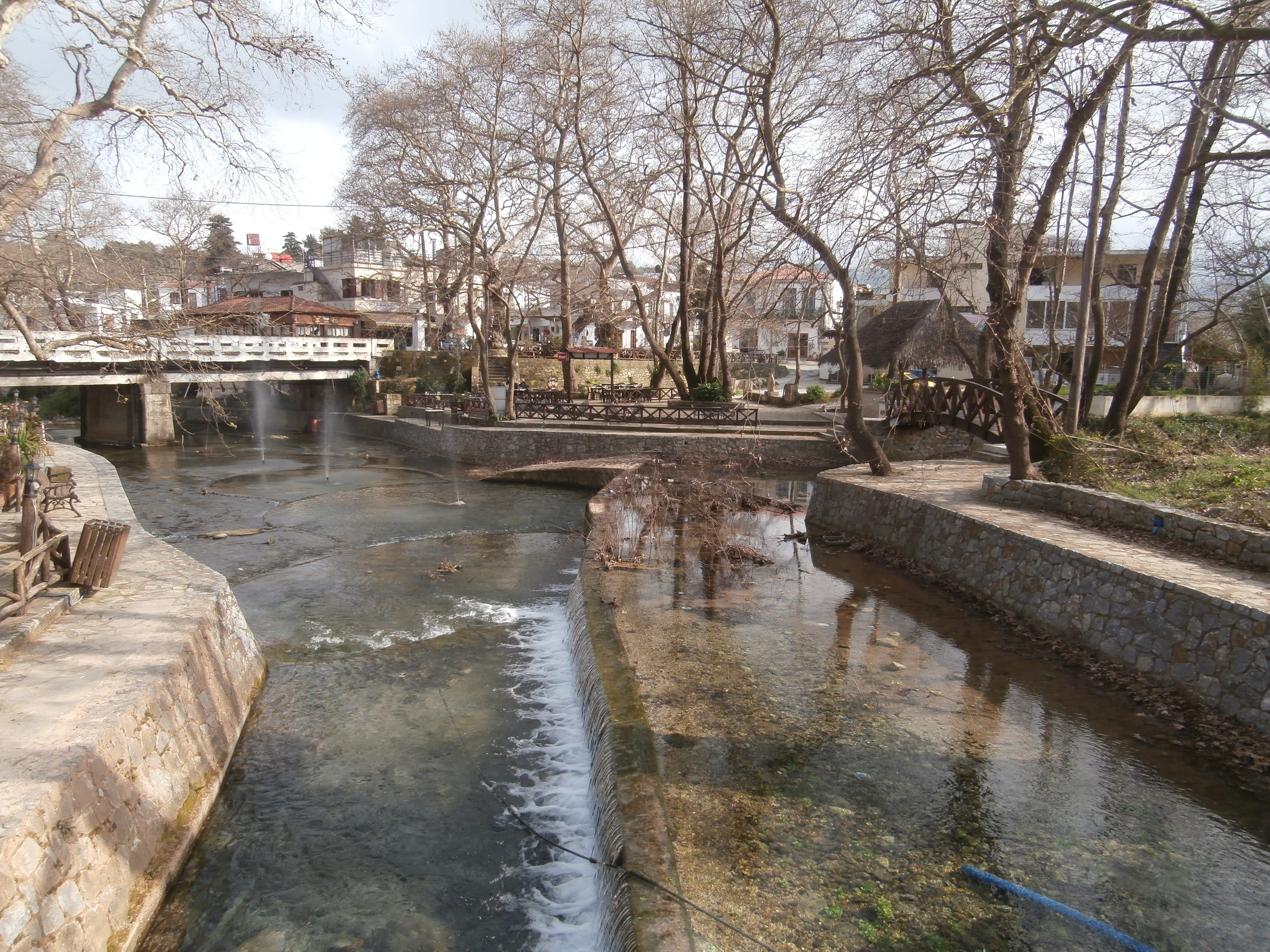
- A view of the river that crosses the village

- Location within Greece
- Coordinates: 35°22′19″N 24°12′00″E
- Country: Greece
- Administrative region: Crete
- Regional unit: Chania
- Municipality: Apokoronas
- Municipal unit: Kryonerida

Population (2021)
  - Community: 854
- Time zone: UTC+2 (EET)
  - Summer (DST): UTC+3 (EEST)

Vryses (Greek: Βρύσες) is a village in Crete, Greece, and the seat of the municipality of Apokoronas. It has a population of 854 inhabitants according to the 2021 census. It is now a popular tourist destination that has maintained its Cretan character.

On New Year's Day 2010 the World Meteorological Organization station of the National Observatory of Athens recorded a maximum temperature of 30.4 °C in Vryses, which is the highest January temperature ever recorded in Greece. Furthermore, Vryses recorded 32.1 °C in February 2010 making it the highest temperature ever recorded in Greece during February.
