= Gavalochori =

Gavalochori Γαβαλοχώρι
- Community
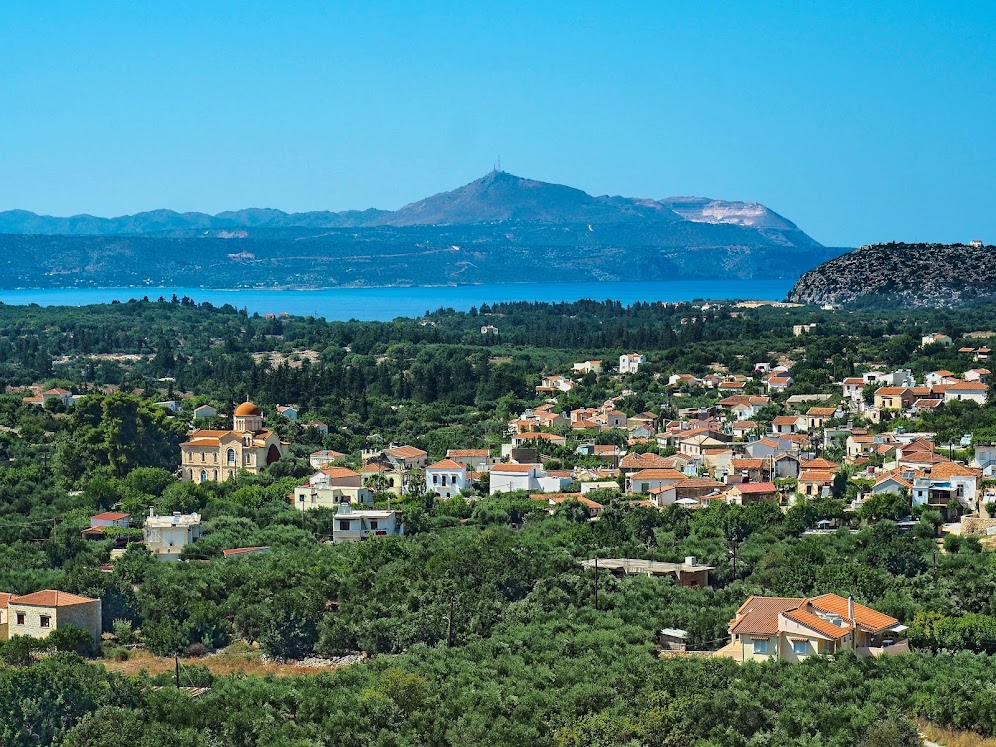

- Location within Greece
- Coordinates: 35°25′28″N 24°12′41″E
- Country: Greece
- Administrative region: Crete
- Regional unit: Chania
- Municipality: Apokoronas
- Municipal unit: Vamos

Population (2021)
  - Community: 612
- Time zone: UTC+2 (EET)
  - Summer (DST): UTC+3 (EEST)

Gavalochori, also spelled Gavalohori (Greek: Γαβαλοχώρι), is a 1000-year-old village located in the northwestern part of the island of Crete, Greece. The village lies in a valley about three kilometers/1.86 miles directly inland from the coast, or four kilometers/2.5 mile by road. Gavalochori is located in the municipality of Apokoronas and has a population of 612 (2021).

Gavalochori is a historic working village and is home to twelve churches, two squares, two tavernas, a kafeneio (coffee shop/pub), a bakery, two markets, an artisan shop, a hair salon, a stone-cutting business, a taxi service, and a civil engineering office. The village is surrounded by olive groves that serve as the agricultural base for the area.

== History ==
Gavalochori has a long and complex history. Evidence of early habitation includes double-bladed axes, vessels, lamps, utensils, and roof tiles from the Minoan age (3000–1450 BC) and coins, house foundations, tiles, and water cisterns from the Mycenaean or Dorian era (1450–1100 BC). In addition, coins, vessels, foundations, and tombs are still in evidence from the Roman (67–395 AD) period. Many buildings in the village derive from Byzantine (961–1204 AD), Venetian (1210–1669 AD), and Turkish times (1669–1898 AD).

The origin story that is often told about Gavalochori is that the village was established when the Byzantine emperor Alexios Komnenos in Constantinople sent 12 nobles to Crete at the turn of the 12th century to prevent an anticipated revolt against him. According to the story, the nobles divided Crete into 12 areas, with each of them ruling one area and often naming it after himself. One of these nobles was Filippos Gavalas, so the name Gavalochori means "village of Gavalas." Most scholars now believe that the document supposedly issued by the emperor that sent the nobles to Crete was forged. It was probably constructed to provide the powerful Cretan landowners, including the Gavalas family, with a legal basis for the maintenance of their properties after the Venetians conquered the island.

Although Gavalochori is 1,000 years old, its written history is currently only available for about the past 300 years. As documents are discovered and analyzed, earlier periods in Gavalochori's history will benefit from a more comprehensive telling of the story of the village. What is known is that, despite its noble beginnings, Gavalochori has not had an easy history. The village was hit with devastating plagues in 1770, 1797, and 1810. A destructive rain fell on Gavalochori in 1862, and torrents of water rushed through the village, destroying houses and other property and drowning a number of residents. The early 20th century was another particularly difficult time for Gavalochori. Unemployment led many men in the village to migrate to America to work in the coal mines. In 1906 alone, 200 men from Gavalochori left, depriving the village of much of its workforce (the village at the time had a population of 1200–1500).

Crete has long had to deal with invaders—Dorians, Romans, Byzantines, Arabs, Venetians, and Turks. Gavalochori residents faced a particularly difficult period of unwanted invasion when, during World War II, German soldiers occupied the village. They used the elementary school as their headquarters, and they also identified rooms in houses that they liked and moved in, with villagers forced to live side by side with their German occupiers. The Germans also ordered the adult men of Gavalochori and surrounding villages to build fortifications at the entrance to nearby Souda Bay.

Life in Gavalochori remained fairly unchanged until the late 1960s, when electricity and a municipal water system were brought to the village. Before that, oil lamps were used to light interior spaces, and the houses had cisterns, typically made of stone, that stored rainwater. The village also had wells that were fed by two underground streams.

Gavalochori is and always has been an agricultural village. Although tourism provides some economic support for villagers today, many people in the village continue to engage in the age-old agricultural practices of raising grapes, olives, and animals. In the past, the making of silk; stone cutting; tanning leather; and the growing of wheat, cotton, sesame, carobs, and figs were major economic drivers of the village, but they are no longer significant commercial activities in Gavalochori.

== Culture ==
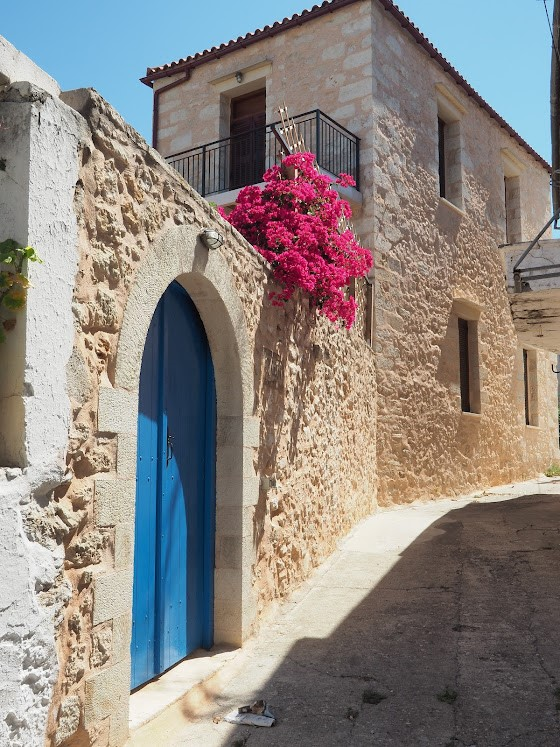
Bougainvillea, Stone House, Gavalochori. Photograph by Terry Dorvinen.

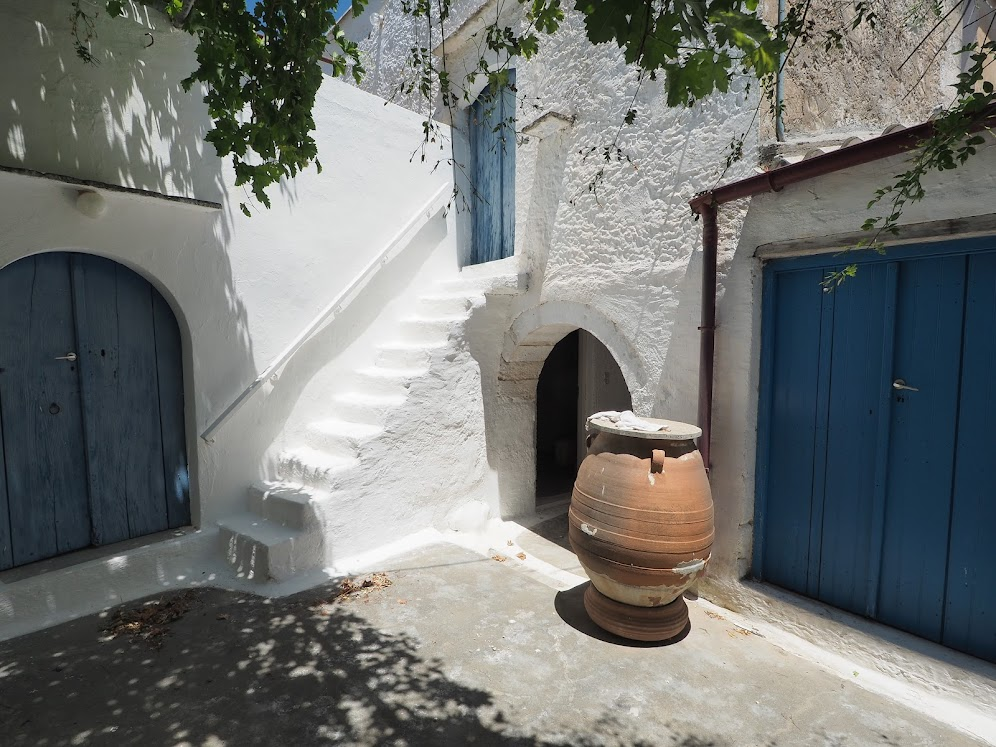
Courtyard, Traditional House, Gavalochori. Photograph by Terry Dorvinen.

Gavalochori has been designated by the Ministry of Culture as a historically preserved place with a landscape of particular natural beauty as well as a site of popular architecture without significant modern alterations. Although new houses are being built in Gavalochori and especially on the hills above the village, Gavalochori has retained its traditional feel in part because so much of its architecture has been preserved. Many of the homes in Gavalochori are 300 to 500 years old and are either one- or two-story houses constructed of three primary materials—stone, soil, and wood. To foster the village's commitment to its history and culture, the Cultural Association of Gavalochori sponsors programs and organizes festivals of various kinds to uphold the traditions of the village.

=== Local Sites ===
Gavalochori has a number of historic sites that provide a glimpse into its long history:

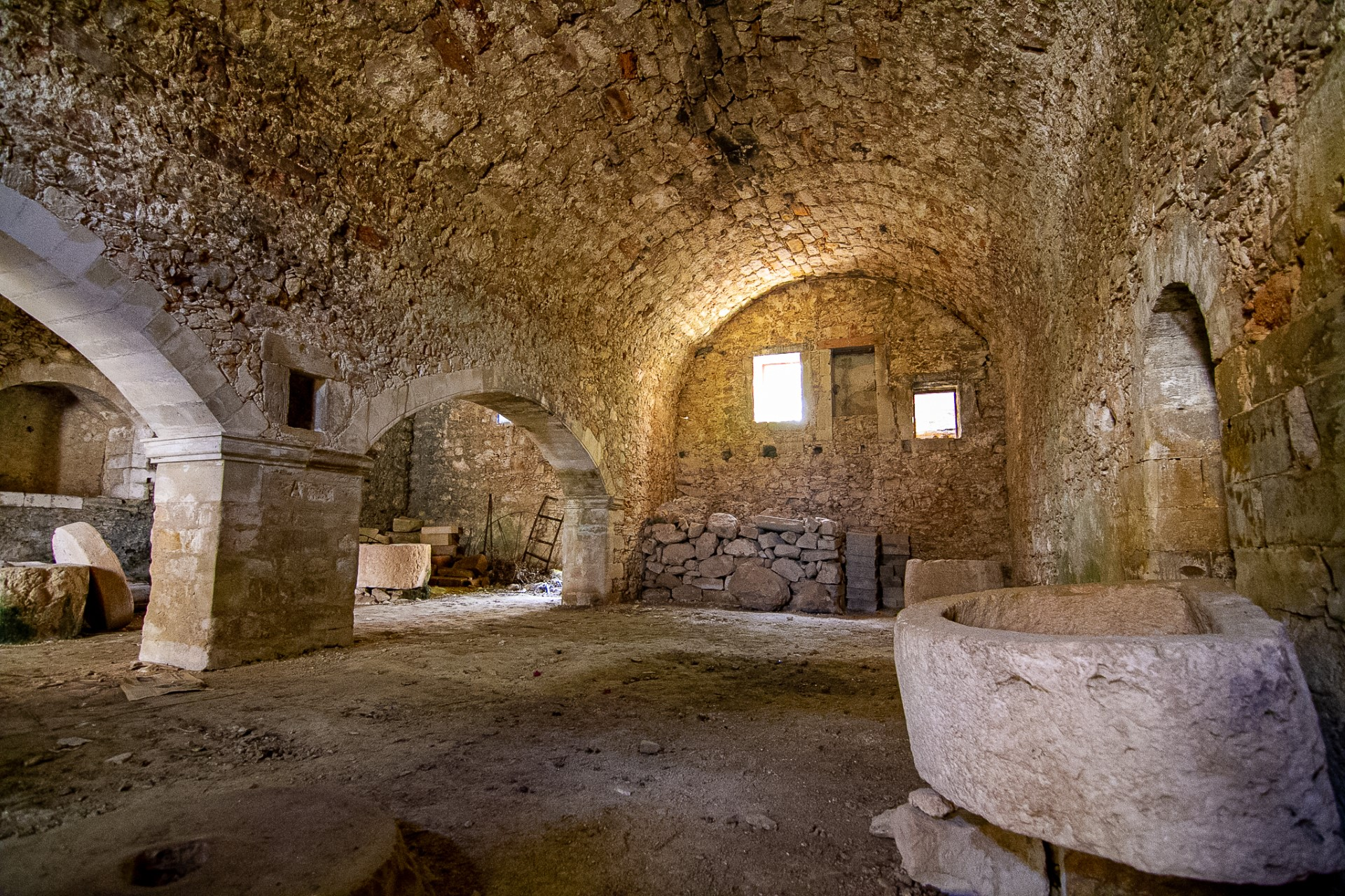
Pre-Industrial Olive Mill, Gavalochori. Photograph by Fábio Castel Garcia.

· A restored 17th century olive mill

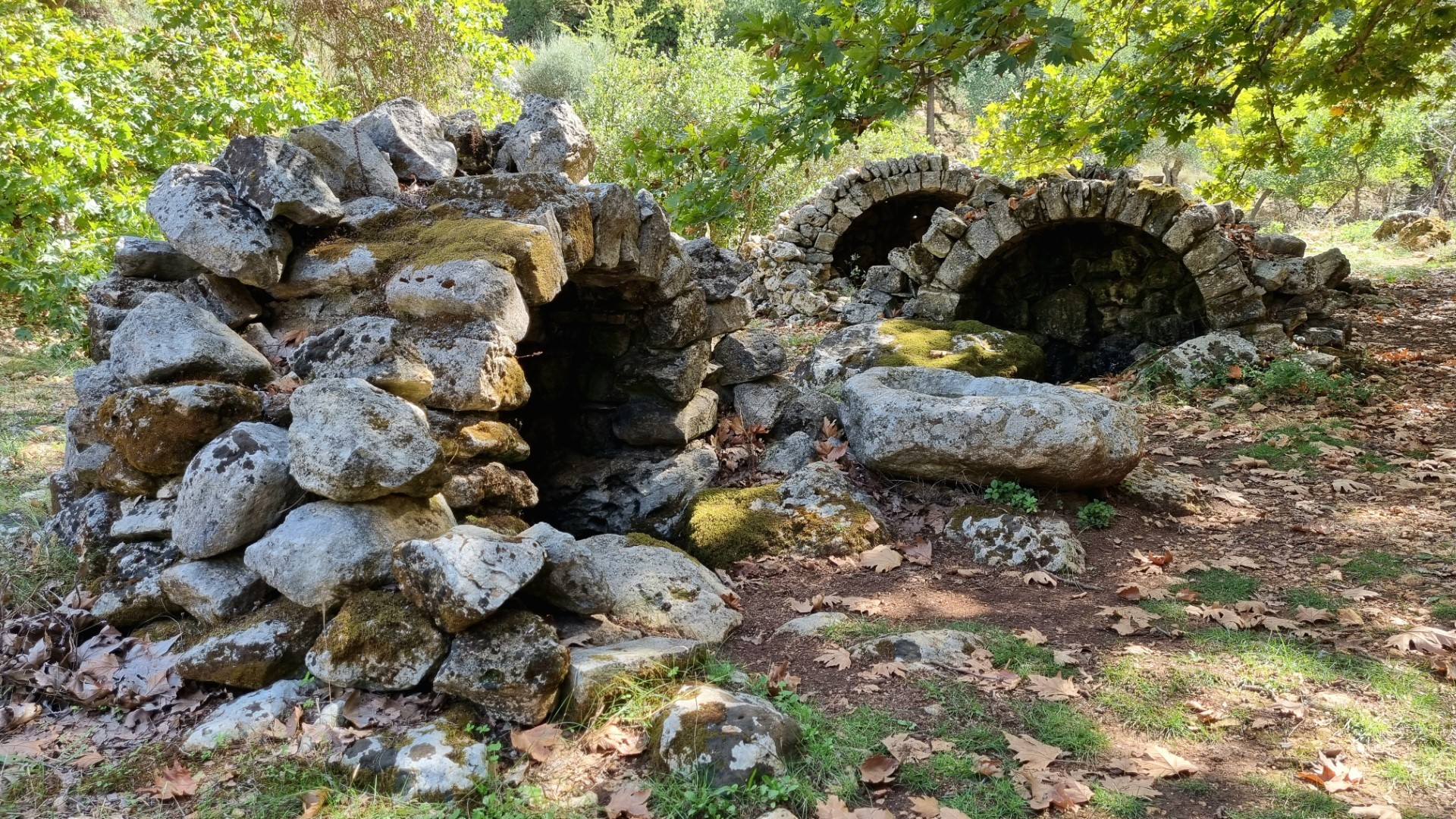
Venetian Wells, Gavalochori. Photograph by Luka Tica.

· Venetian wells that were built in the 15th or 16th centuries

· A folklore museum that displays historic objects made and/or used by residents of Gavalochori and items excavated from nearby archaeological sites

· An elementary school ("old school") built by the villagers in 1913

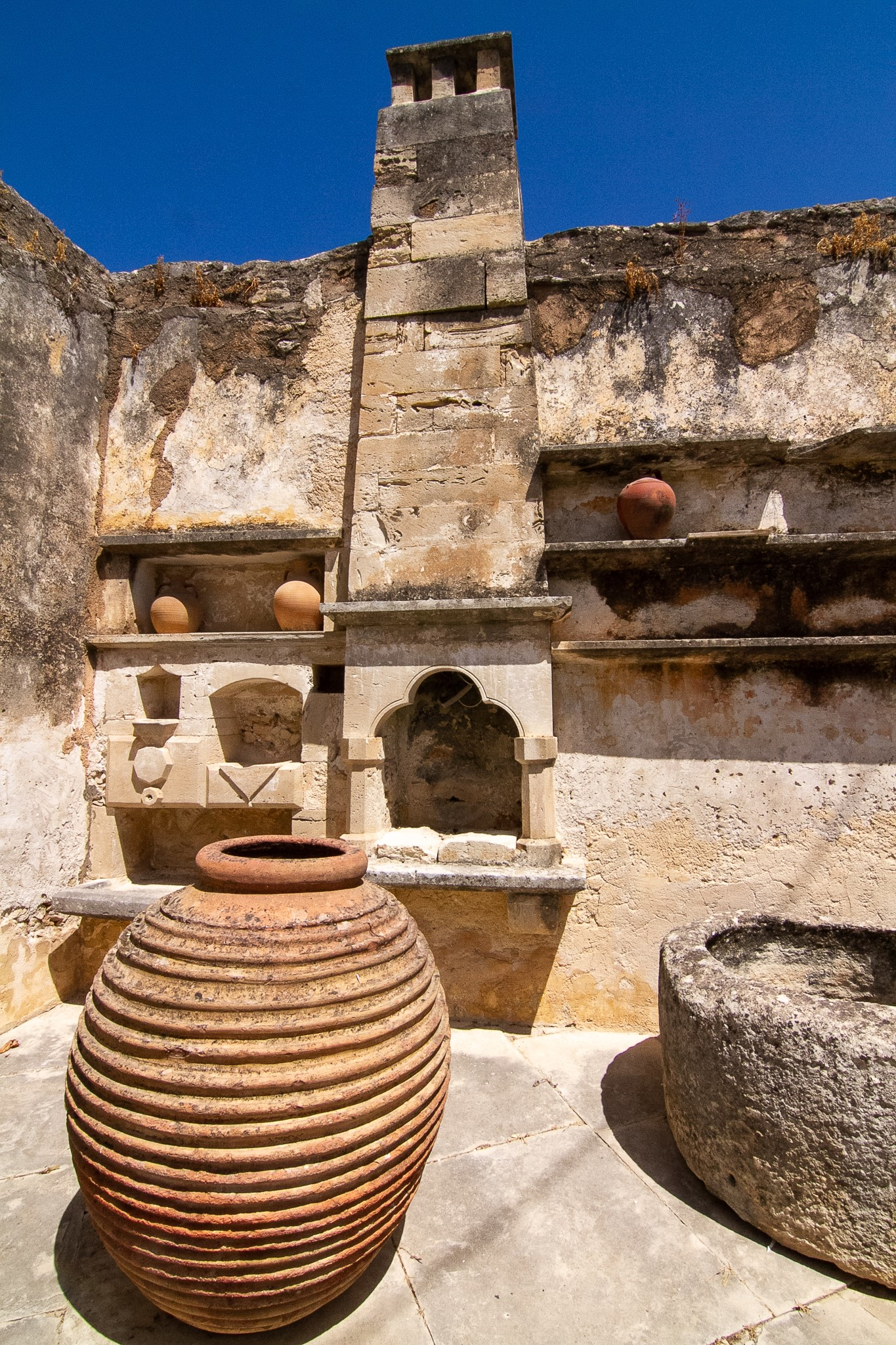
Historic Corner ("Old Kafeneio"), Gavalochori. Photograph by Fábio Castel Garcia.

· Historic Corner ("Old Kafeneio"), a kafeneio (coffeeshop/pub) until occupying Germans cut it in half in order to allow their vehicles to navigate the corner

· Twelve churches:

Church of Saint Anthony, dating to the 17th century

Church of Saint Catherine, dating to 1200 Church of Saint George, dating to medieval times

Church of Saint John, dating to the 17th century

Church of Saint Nectarios, dating from 1980

Church of Saint Phanourios, construction date unknown

Church of Saints Peter and Paul, dating at least to the 17th century

Church of Saints Sergius and Bacchus, dating to 1750

Church of the Holy Cross, dating to 1877

Church of the Nativity of Mary and Church of Saint Charalampos, the first built in 1628 and the second added at an unknown date

Church of Prophet Elijah, dating back at least to the 17th century

=== Nearby Archaeological Sites ===
The closest major archaeological site to Gavalochori is Aptera, which is 17 kilometers (11 miles) away. The site contains layers of ruins dating back to the Minoan period (3000-1450 BC). Set high on a hill, it is the location of a once-prosperous city state. Noteworthy are the large cisterns dating from Roman times.

Another nearby archaeological site is Lappa, which is 32 kilometers (20 miles) from Gavalochori in the village of Argyroupoli. Lappa was a powerful city state dating back at least to 300–400 BC. Its power waxed and waned through the years, but at one time, the city had its own mint and controlled ports on both the north and south coasts of Crete. Ruins at Lappa include numerous Roman tombs, a well-preserved mosaic floor, remains of a Roman bath, and extensive stonework.

=== Live Music ===
Musical events take place at a number of locations in Gavalochori. Live-music events regularly take place at the two tavernas in the village, Gavalianos Kafenes ("Monica's Taverna") and Arismari. In addition, large musical events are presented several times a year in the parking lot next to the old elementary school. In late August or early September, a rock music concert S'Agapame Gavalochori ("We Love Gavalochori") is held at this location.

=== Gavalochori Light Festival ===
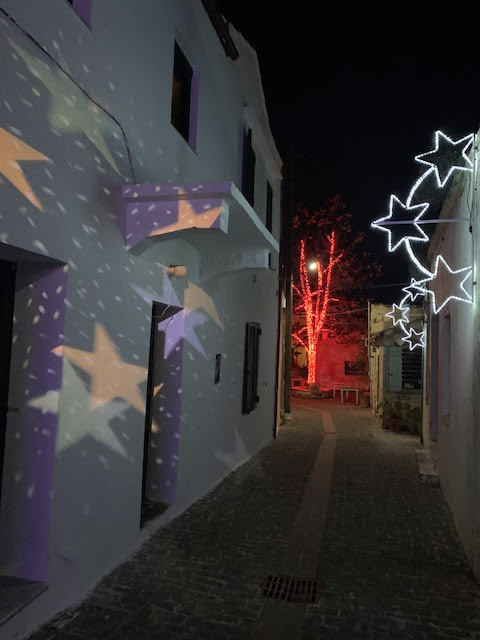
Light Festival, Gavalochori. Photograph by Anthony Radich.

For about a month during the winter holiday season, Gavalochori hosts a light festival, with holiday lights displayed throughout the village. This celebration of light was begun in December 2019. Its opening is marked with a ceremony that features speeches, music, dancing, and mezes in the main square. The lights are usually taken down shortly after Epiphany on January 6.

=== Easter Celebration ===
On the Saturday night before Easter Sunday, Gavalochori hosts a ritual celebrating the resurrection of Jesus. Residents of the village and nearby villages gather in the open area outside of the Church of Saints Sergius and Bacchus, with everyone bringing a candle. At midnight, following a church service, the lights in the church re extinguished until the priest appears with a lighted candle and says, "Δευτε λάβετε φως εκ του ανεσπέρου φοτος και δοξάζεται Χριστός τών αναστάντα εκ

νεκρών!" The priest lights a candle with the "Holy Flame" and lights the candle of someone standing near him. That individual then lights the candle of someone nearby, and the light is transferred from one to another until all of the candles held by the people gathered have been lighted. 

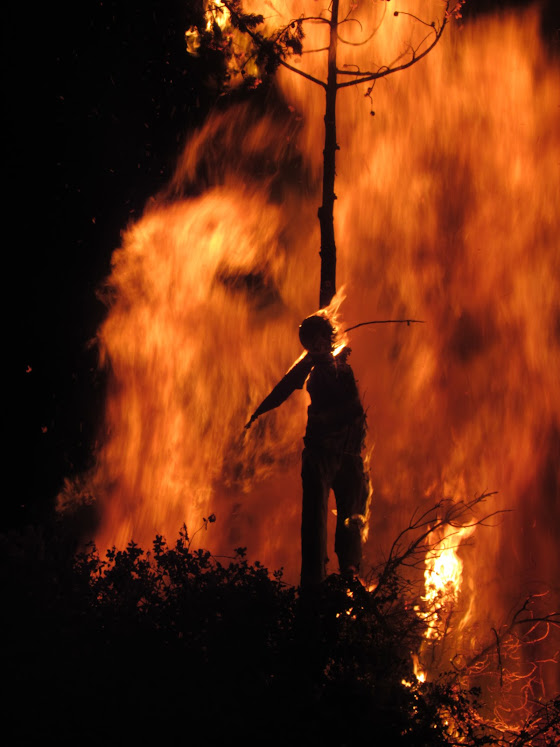
Judas Burning in Effigy, Easter, Gavalochori. Photograph by Sonja Foss.

Outside the church, an effigy of Judas is tied atop a pyre of tree branches that has been prepared in the days leading up to the Saturday service. After everyone's candle is lighted, the pyre is torched, and Judas is burned in effigy, accompanied by firecrackers and fireworks. Following the burning of Judas, everyone moves to the main square, where members of the Cultural Association of Gavalochori serve raki, wine, and hard-boiled eggs dyed bright red to represent the blood of Christ.

=== Kopaneli Lace ===
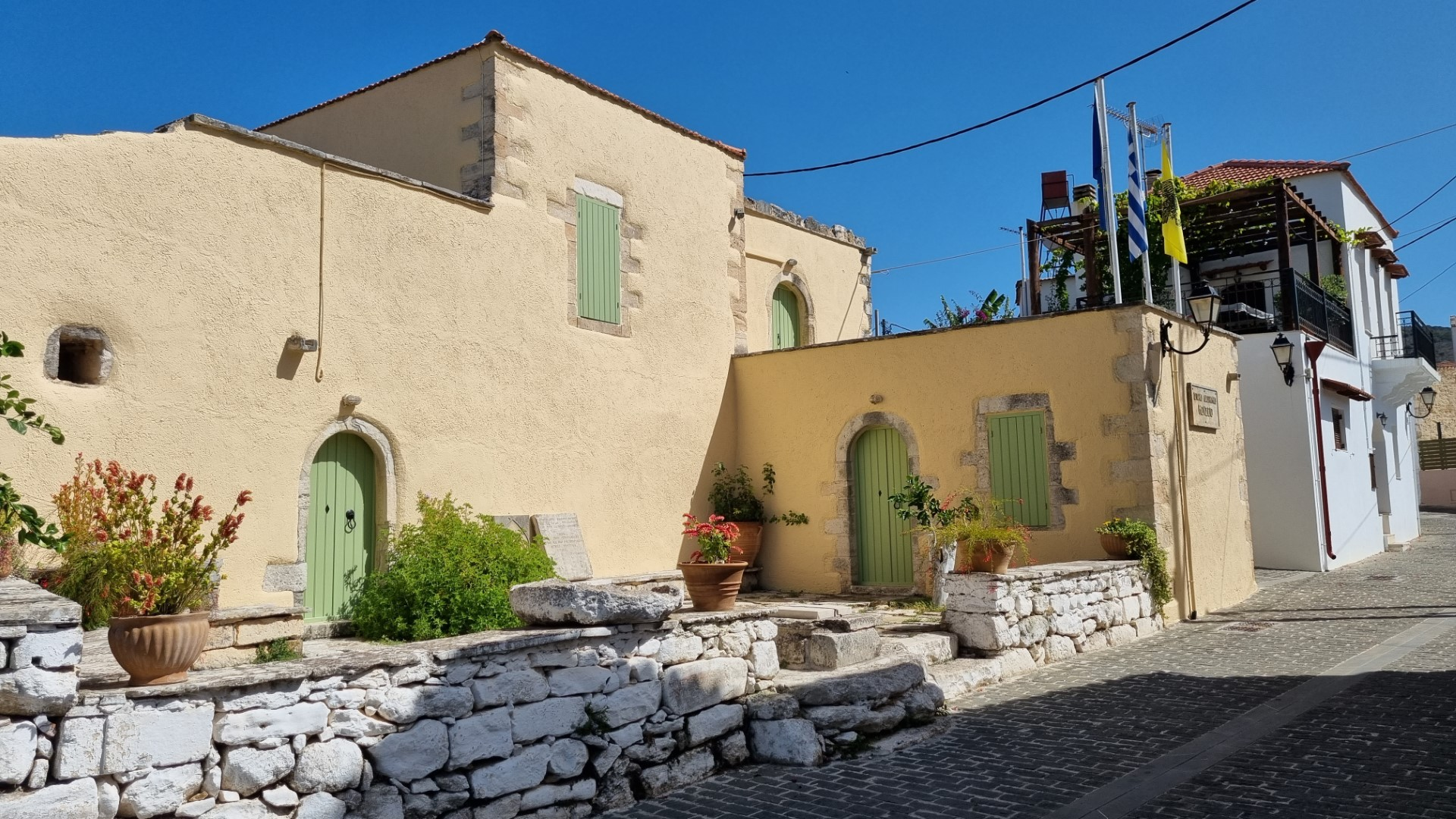
Folklore Museum, Gavalochori. Photograph by Luka Tica.

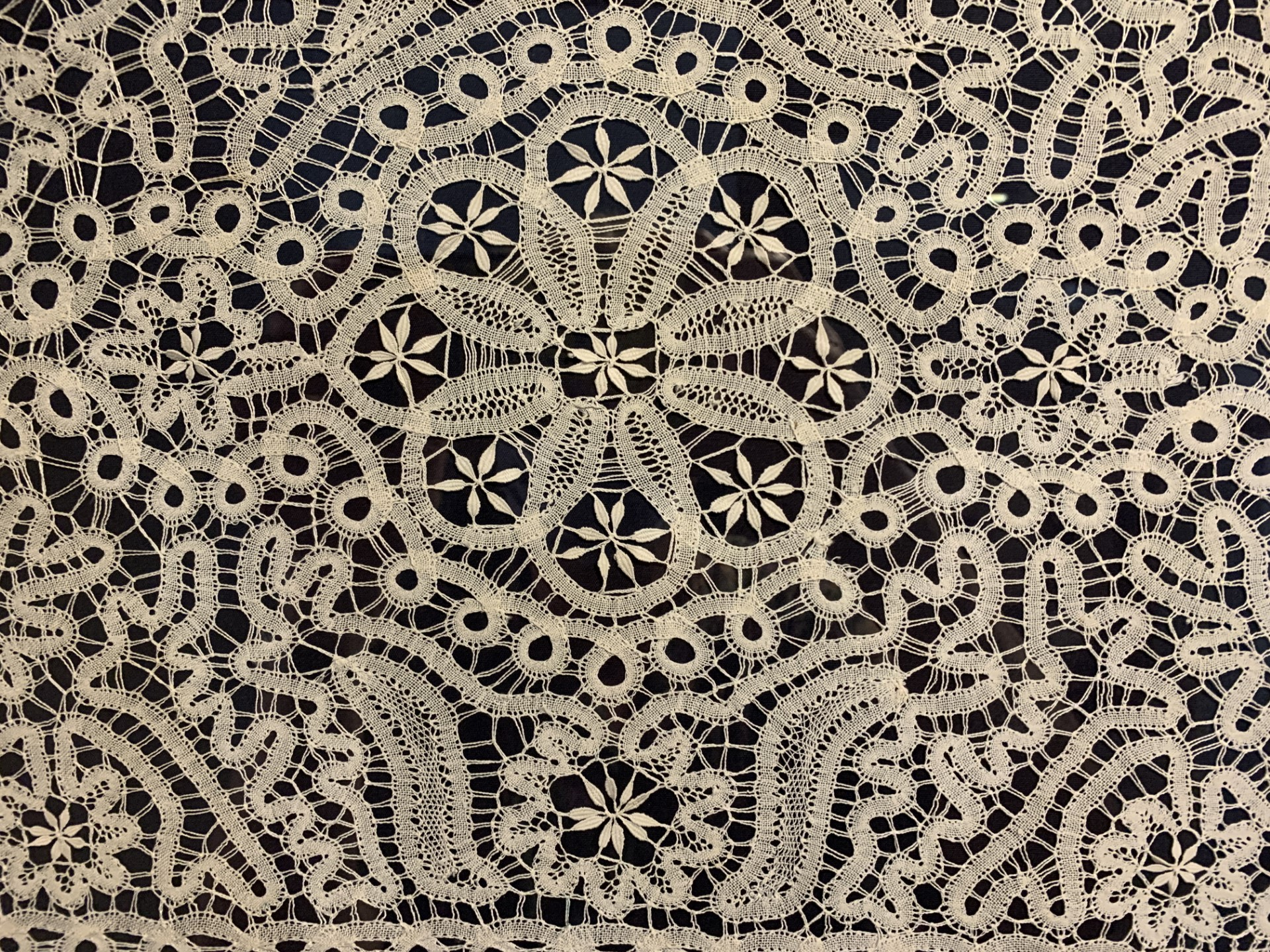
Kopaneli Lace, Folklore Museum, Gavalochori. Photograph by Sonja Foss.

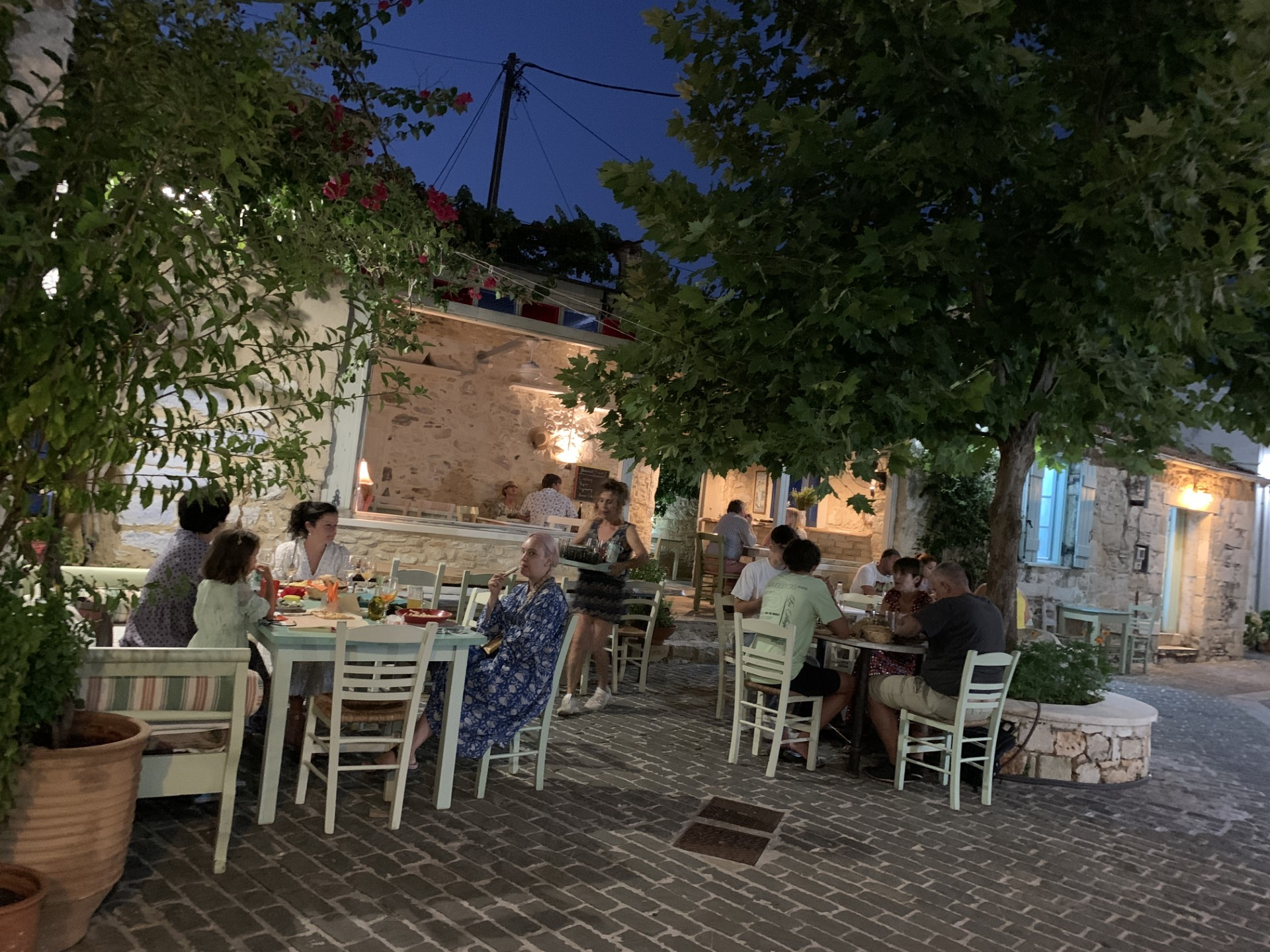
Platanaki Square, Gavalochori. Photograph by Anthony Radich.

Until the end of the 19th century and even as late as 1950 on Crete, silk was produced at home by women who fed the leaves of the local mulberry trees to silkworms. Along with the making of silk, the women of Gavalochori participated in the making of bobbin lace known as kopaneli, in which lace is made from silk thread on a bolster pillow with bobbins. The art of bobbin lace appeared on Crete between 1906 and 1908 when a nun from Gavalochori, Minodora Athanasaki, learned bobbin lace making when she attended school in Athens and then taught it to the rest of the nuns in her convent of Holy Prodromou in Chania. Because there were many nuns in that convent from Gavalochori, the art spread quickly through the village. The art of bobbin lace continues to be practiced by a few women in Gavalochori, and they occasionally gather in one of Gavalochori's public buildings or squares to work together on their lace projects. Samples of the lace and as well as a pillow and bobbins for making the lace can be seen in the Folklore Museum in Gavalochori.

== Recreation and sports ==
Gavalochori is located a short distance from the coast. The nearby beaches offer a variety of rental equipment for water sports such as kayaks, wind-surfing equipment, pedal boats, and catamarans. The area has a number of paths and roadways that take hikers by scenic ruins and through fields and forests.

== Climate ==
The climate of Gavalochori is a temperate Mediterranean climate with hot, dry summers and mild winters. The village has approximately 300 days of sunshine every year.

January and February are the winter months, and the season has a number of rainy days with temperatures ranging from 8–15 °C (46–59 °F). Rainfall measures on average about 15 centimetres (5.9 inches) during this period with about 15 wet days in each of these months. As a result, Gavalochori and the surrounding area are very green in the winter, and the area supports many evergreen and other trees.

Spring in Gavalochori is from March to May, and as the spring progresses, rainfall decreases, and the days turn warm. In March, the average daytime temperature is 20 °C (68 °F), climbing to 26 °C (79 °F) in May. During this period, all of the wildflowers in and around Gavalochori seem to bloom at once.

Summer in the village runs from June through September, and there is almost no rain during this period. The temperature averages between 28 and 35 °C (82 and 95 °F), but recently, due to climate change, Crete has been experiencing heat waves of several days where the temperatures have reached as high as 40 °C (104 °F). The temperature of the nearby sea in the summer months is over 25 °C (77 °F). In the summer, two types of wind may blow across Gavalochori. The meltemi is a strong, cooling, northerly wind, and the sirocco wind blows up from Africa and brings red dust and sand, typically lasting only a day or two.

Autumn in Gavalochori is from October through December, and there are many warm days during this period suitable for swimming. There are more rainy days, however, as the season progresses, with an average rainfall of 10 centimetres (3.9 inches) and 9 wet days in December. The average temperature in October is 20 °C (68 °F), dropping to 14 °C (57 °F) in December.

== Notable Locals ==
Konstantinos Malinos was a fighter who helped Crete resist Turkish rule. Born in 1832 in Agios Pavlos, a part of Gavalochori, he began his revolutionary activity in 1858 and participated in the Cretan revolutions of 1866 and 1878. He also participated in the 1896 battle of Almyrida, which was the last battle the Cretans fought against the Turks. From 1895 to 1899, he served as the mayor of the nearby village of Vamos. Malinos died in 1913, just a few months before the unification of Crete with Greece.

Charalambos I. Papadakis was a lawyer who resisted Turkish rule. Born in Gavalochori in 1866, he participated in many armed attacks against the Turkish army and the Turkish police on Crete. He was arrested in 1892, accused of treason, and imprisoned. Because his guilt could not be proven, however, he was temporarily released on a bond. His arrest did not stop his revolutionary activity, and he was seriously injured in the 1896 battle against the Turks in Almyrida. Papadakis served in various political positions as Crete transitioned from Turkish rule to becoming an autonomous state and then to unification with Greece. He was one of the first members of the Central Commission of the Political Changeover of Crete in 1895 and was bestowed with the power to act on behalf of Crete in the signing of treaties and other such business. In 1912, he was elected deputy of the revolutionary assembly of Chania. Following Crete's incorporation into Greece in 1913, he served as the prefect or high official of Rethymno, Serres, and Sammos.

Katerina Angelopoulou, who was born in Gavalochori, was the mother of Theodoros "Theo" Angelopoulos, a filmmaker, screenwriter, and film producer. He was known for his slow, episodic and ambiguous narrative structures and complex, carefully composed scenes. His films include Days of '36 and Landscape in the Mist; his film Eternity and a Day won the Palme d'Or prize at the Cannes Film Festival in 1998.
