= FMN reductase =

Enzyme

FMN reductase Riboflavin mononucleotide reductase

Identifiers
- EC no.: 1.5.1.29
- CAS no.: 64295-83-6

Databases
- IntEnz: IntEnz view
- BRENDA: BRENDA entry
- ExPASy: NiceZyme view
- KEGG: KEGG entry
- MetaCyc: metabolic pathway
- PRIAM: profile
- PDB structures: RCSB PDB PDBe PDBsum
- Gene Ontology: AmiGO / QuickGO
Search
- PMC: articles
- PubMed: articles
- NCBI: proteins

In enzymology, an FMN reductase (EC 1.5.1.29) is an enzyme that catalyzes the chemical reaction

FMNH_{2} + NAD(P)+ $\rightleftharpoons$ FMN + NAD(P)H + H^{+}

The 3 substrates of this enzyme are FMNH_{2}, NAD^{+}, and NADP^{+}, whereas its 4 products are FMN, NADH, NADPH, and H^{+}.

This enzyme belongs to the family of oxidoreductases, specifically those acting on the CH-NH group of donors with NAD+ or NADP+ as acceptor. The systematic name of this enzyme class is FMNH_{2}:NAD(P)+ oxidoreductase. Other names in common use include NAD(P)H-FMN reductase, NAD(P)H-dependent FMN reductase, NAD(P)H:FMN oxidoreductase, NAD(P)H:flavin oxidoreductase, NAD(P)H_{2} dehydrogenase (FMN), NAD(P)H_{2}:FMN oxidoreductase, SsuE, riboflavin mononucleotide reductase, flavine mononucleotide reductase, riboflavin mononucleotide (reduced nicotinamide adenine dinucleotide, (phosphate)) reductase, flavin mononucleotide reductase, and riboflavine mononucleotide reductase.
