= Apokoronas =

Apokoronas Αποκόρωνας
- Municipality
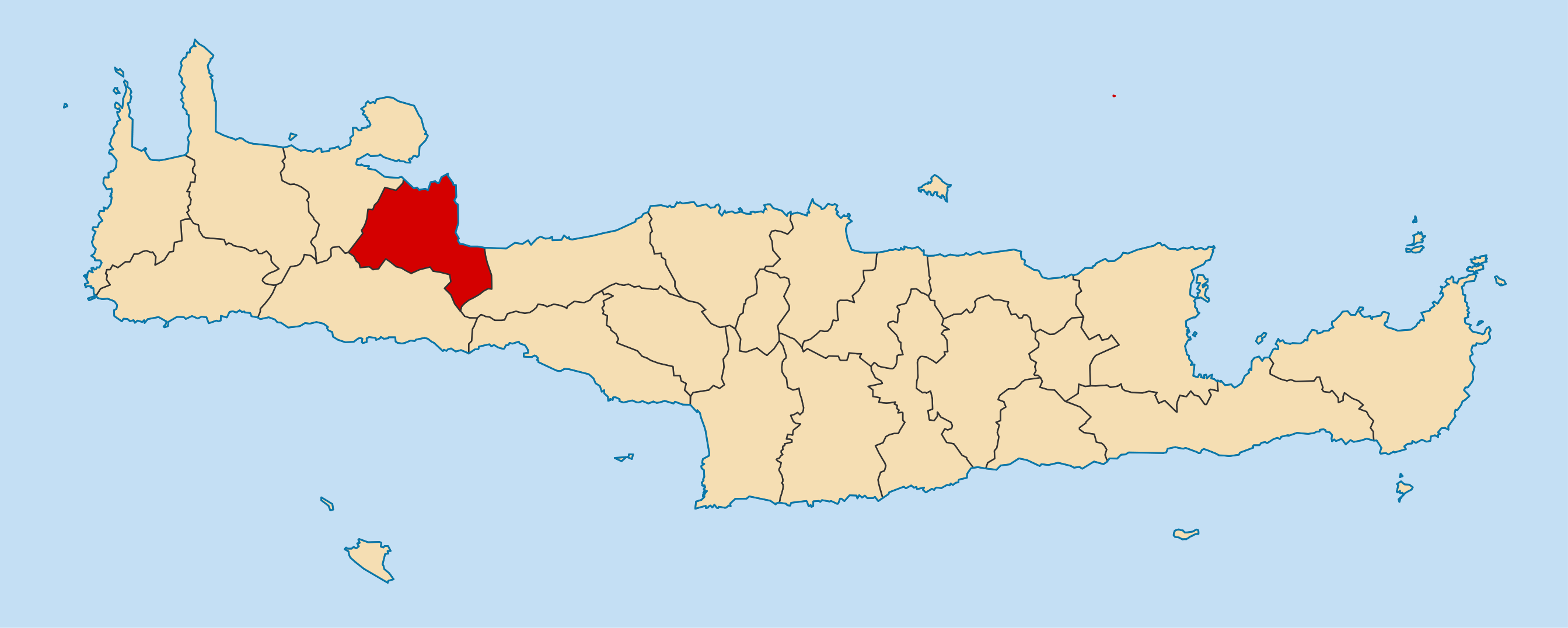

- Location within Greece
- Coordinates: 35°23′N 24°12′E
- Country: Greece
- Administrative region: Crete
- Regional unit: Chania
- Seat: Vryses

Area
  - Municipality: 315.5 km^{2} (121.8 sq mi)

Population (2021)
  - Municipality: 12,247
  - Density: 38.82/km^{2} (100.5/sq mi)
- Time zone: UTC+2 (EET)
  - Summer (DST): UTC+3 (EEST)

Apokoronas (Greek: Αποκόρωνας) is a municipality and a former province (επαρχία) in the Chania regional unit, north-west Crete, Greece. It is situated on the north coast of Crete, to the east of Chania itself. The seat of the municipality is the village Vryses. The municipality has an area of 315.478 km^{2} (121.807 sq mi). It has a total of 75 villages.

== Geography ==
Apokoronas extends from the foothills of the White Mountains north to the coast, in a wide plain with rolling hills. To the east, Cape Drapanon rises above the plain and extends out into the Sea of Crete. The area is very green and fertile, unusual for rocky Crete. The Kiliaris river, known in antiquity as 'Pyknos', runs through the region. Robert Pashley suggested that the name 'Apokoronas' came from the ancient city of Ippokoronas or Ippokoronion, also cited by Strabo. This city may have been located near modern Nipos, or on the site of the Venetian fortress, Castel Apicorono, on an outcrop between Kalyves and Almyrida. The major towns of Apokoronas are Vamos, Armenoi and Vryses, with police, municipal and utility offices as well as taverns and large churches; Kalyves, Almyrida and Georgioupoli are the largest beach resorts. Tourism and agriculture are the major local industries, with much construction and quarrying to satisfy the demands of many foreigners eager to buy or rent properties in what used to be beautiful and traditional villages. Gavalochori is among the more popular villages. Many residents or workers in Chania also have homes in the area.

Apokoronas was the location of much of the filming of the movie Zorba the Greek.

== Municipality ==
The municipality Apokoronas was formed at the 2011 local government reform by the merger of the following 6 former municipalities, that became municipal units:

- Armenoi
- Asi Gonia
- Fres
- Georgioupoli
- Kryonerida
- Vamos

== Province ==
The province of Apokoronas (Greek: Επαρχία Αποκορώνου) was one of the provinces of Chania Prefecture. It covered the same area as the current municipality. It was abolished in 2006.
