= Fres =

Fres Φρες
- Municipal unit
- Location within the regional unit

- Location within Greece
- Coordinates: 35°21′N 24°7′E
- Country: Greece
- Administrative region: Crete
- Regional unit: Chania
- Municipality: Apokoronas

Area
  - Municipal unit: 53.8 km^{2} (20.8 sq mi)
- Elevation: 220 m (720 ft)

Population (2021)
  - Municipal unit: 787
  - Municipal unit density: 14.6/km^{2} (37.9/sq mi)
  - Community: 228
- Time zone: UTC+2 (EET)
  - Summer (DST): UTC+3 (EEST)
- Postal code: 730 08
- Area code: 28250
- Vehicle registration: ΧΝ

Fres (Greek: Φρες) is a village and former municipality in the Chania regional unit, Crete, Greece. Since the 2011 local government reform, it is part of the municipality Apokoronas, of which it is a municipal unit. The municipal unit has an area of 53.819 km^{2} (20.780 sq mi). The municipal unit of Fres has a population of 787 (2021). The city has a large main square surrounded by several cafés where the locals in the village meet and socialize. An archway in Fres leads through to the upper village and to the chapel of Our Lady of the Two Rocks.

It takes in foothills of the White Mountains (Lefka Ori). The settlements in Fres are Paidochori, Pemonia, Tzitzifes, Melidoni and Fres village.

== See also ==
- List of settlements in the Chania regional unit
