= Riboflavin reductase (NAD(P)H) =

Identifiers
- EC no.: 1.5.1.41

Databases
- IntEnz: IntEnz view
- BRENDA: BRENDA entry
- ExPASy: NiceZyme view
- KEGG: KEGG entry
- MetaCyc: metabolic pathway
- PRIAM: profile
- PDB structures: RCSB PDB PDBe PDBsum
Search
- PMC: articles
- PubMed: articles
- NCBI: proteins

Riboflavin reductase (NAD(P)H) (EC 1.5.1.41, NAD(P)H-FMN reductase, Fre) is an enzyme with systematic name riboflavin:NAD(P)^{+} oxidoreductase. This enzyme catalyses the following chemical reaction

reduced riboflavin + NAD(P)+ $\rightleftharpoons$ riboflavin + NAD(P)H + H^{+}

This enzyme catalyses the reduction of soluble flavins.

The structure of the protein suggests that the enzymatic mechanism of flavin reductase is of a bisubstrate-biproduct nature3. Due to its structural features, the enzyme is not able to bind both NAD(P)H and flavin at the same time. Therefore, in the proposed mechanism the flavin reductase first binds NAD(P)H and stabilizes the release of a hydride3. Next, NAD(P)+ is released and the flavin mononucleotide binds to the enzyme. This is followed by further protonation when the hydride attacks a nitrogen atom on the flavin mononucleotide3. Finally, the reduced flavin is released from flavin reductase. If this mechanism is indeed correct, it suggests that the reduction of flavin by flavin reductase is dependent on the enzyme binding first to NAD(P)H3.
