= Sellia, Chania =

Sellia Σελλία
- Community
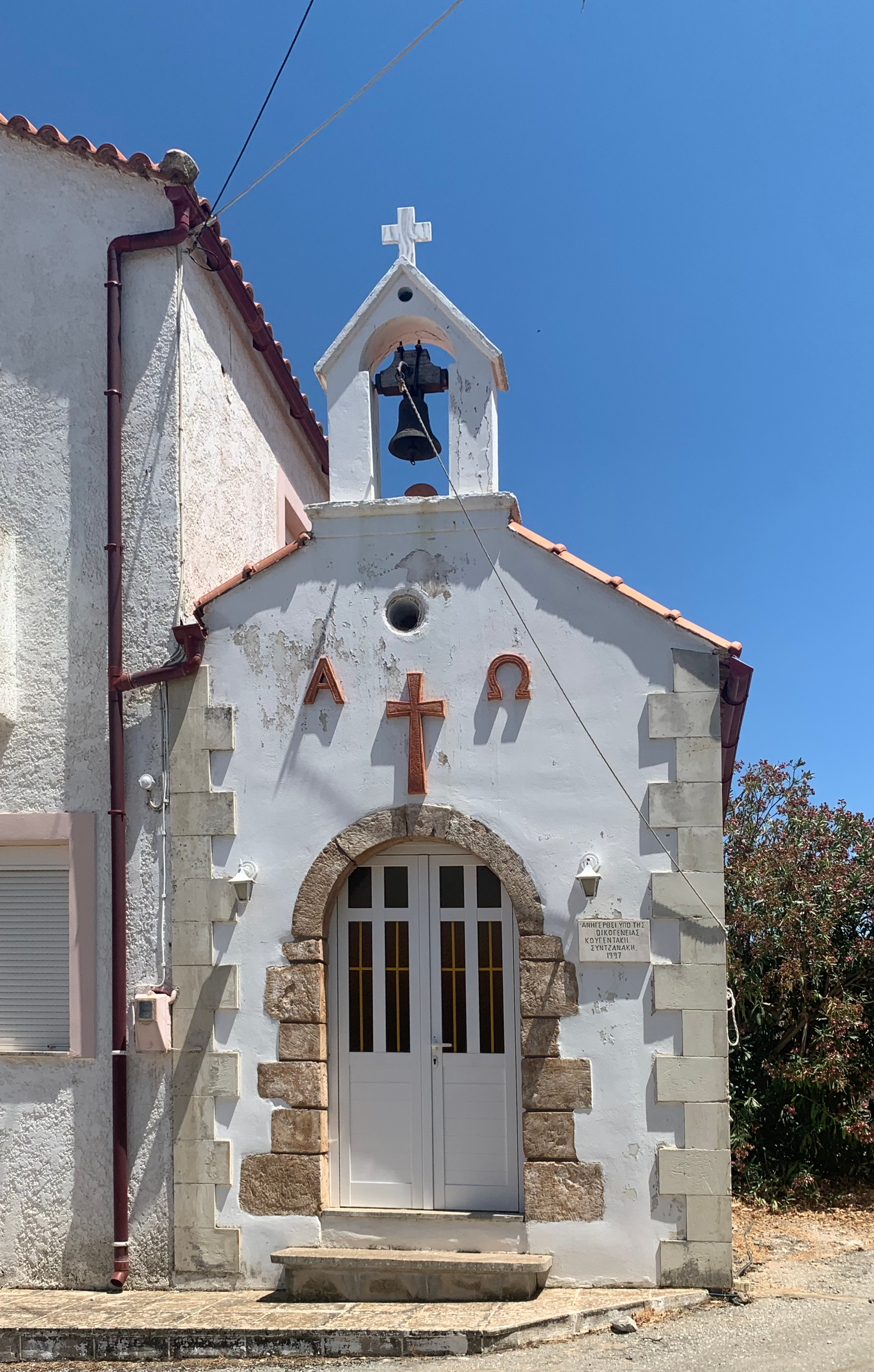
- A church at Sellia

- Location within Greece
- Coordinates: 35°23′37″N 24°14′15″E
- Country: Greece
- Administrative region: Crete
- Regional unit: Chania
- Municipality: Apokoronas
- Municipal unit: Vamos

Population (2021)
  - Community: 119
- Time zone: UTC+2 (EET)
  - Summer (DST): UTC+3 (EEST)

Sellia (Greek: Σελλία) is a small village in Crete, Greece, in the municipal unit of Vamos, in the regional unit of Chania. The village is located in between the towns of Vamos and Georgioupoli on the Drapano Peninsula, close to the north coast of the island, in the Apokoronas region. It has a winter population of 50 and a summer population of about 150. It is divided into Upper and Lower Sellia. It is a very small, quiet rural village with many older homes and plenty of traditional Cretan charm plus views of the Cretan White Mountains and the Mediterranean Sea. There is a kafenion (coffee house) but all services are available in nearby Vamos.
