= Kefalas =

Kefalas Κεφαλάς
- Community
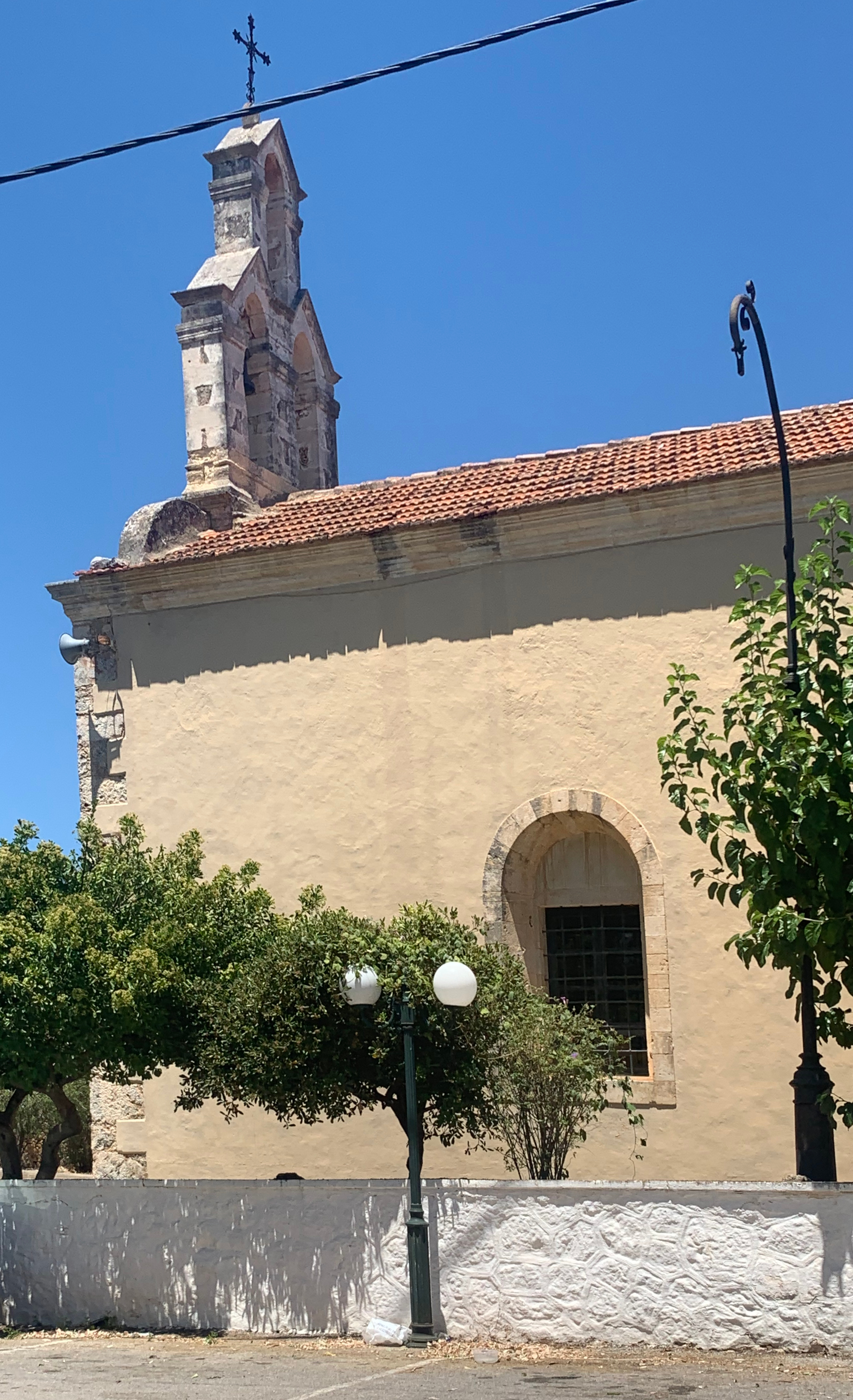
- A church in Kefalas

- Location within Greece
- Coordinates: 35°24′36″N 24°14′42″E
- Country: Greece
- Administrative region: Crete
- Regional unit: Chania
- Municipality: Apokoronas
- Municipal unit: Vamos

Population (2021)
  - Community: 441
- Time zone: UTC+2 (EET)
  - Summer (DST): UTC+3 (EEST)

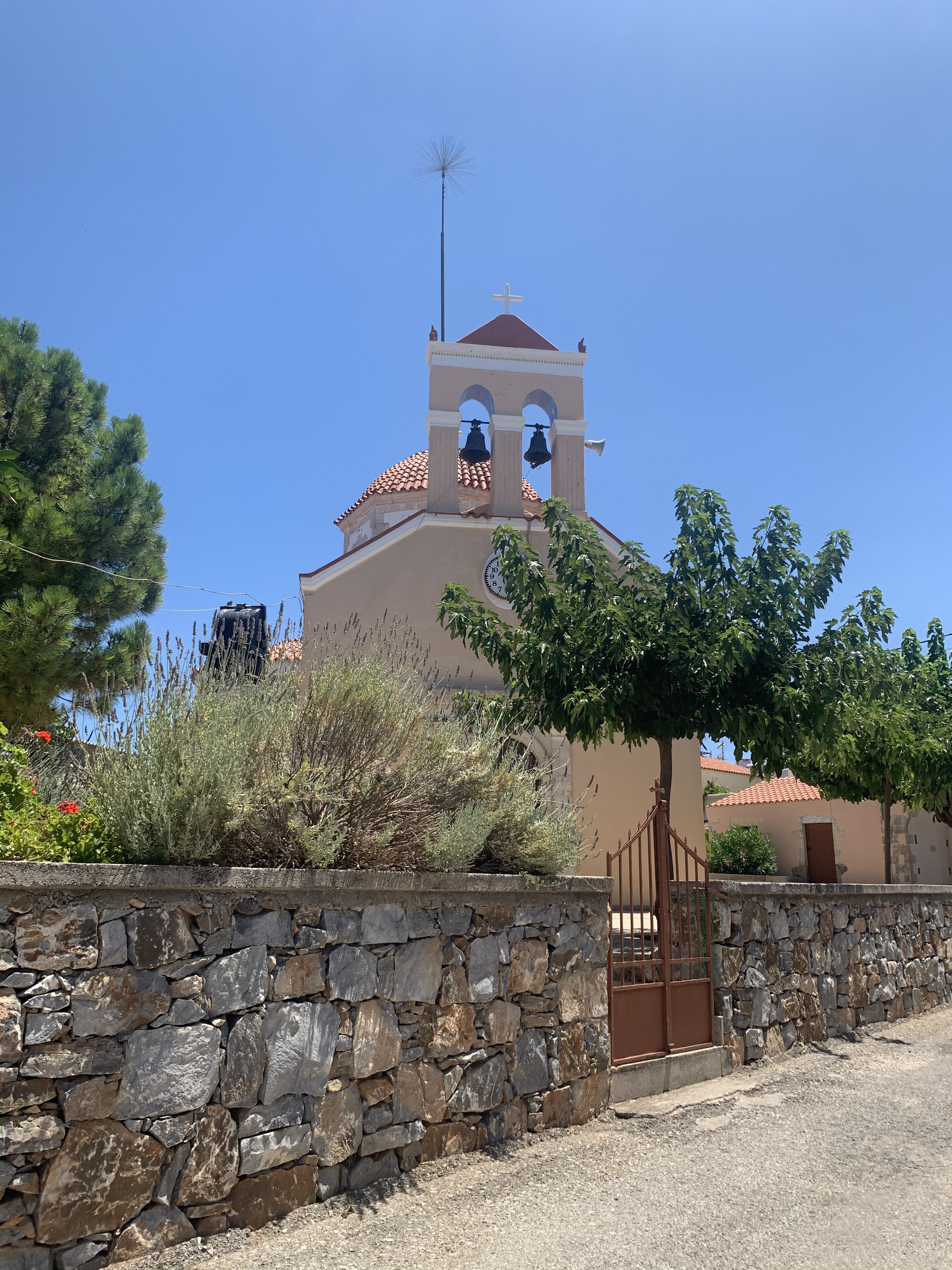
Another church in Kefalas

Kefalas (Greek: Κεφαλάς) is a over 800 years old village on the island of Crete, Greece, 360 m above sea level. It is in the Vamos municipal unit in the Apokoronas municipality. The community consists of the villages Kefalas, Drapanos and Palailoni.

== Overview ==
Kefalas owes its name to the first residents there, called the Kephalades, the leaders of the Byzantine settlers sent to Crete in 1182. It is about five minutes by car from the village of Vamos itself and about 10 minutes to Almyrida beach on the northwest coast of the island. The village is on the northeast edge of the Drapanos peninsula, built facing the sea. Eight churches can be found here. (Local residents talk of up to 25 churches in total, many of which are hidden in private gardens.) There are views from Kefalas to the Bay of Georgioupolis and the Cretan White Mountains.

On the approach to Kefalas from Vamos there is a stone structure with welcome notes in Greek and English. This is the tiny church of The Saint of Miracles, and was built by Vangelis, the museum curator. It is open to the public.

In Kefalas Square there is an old school (renovated and reopened as a School of Environmental Studies). Immediately on the left of the school is an old house, which has been renovated and turned into a museum. It contains artefacts, donated by the villagers, to represent a typical village house from the previous century. An outhouse, across the yard to the rear, holds farming implements and various tools. The museum is open most summer evenings until 10 pm. Entrance is free but small donations are welcomed and help to pay for its upkeep. Also in the square are a taverna, a large church and a statue bearing the names of local people who died during the war.

The village Palailoni is 1 km north of Kefalas. Many old, traditional buildings still remain on the main street which is lined with eucalyptus trees.

On the Drapanos side of Palailoni, is a road at 35°25'21.67"N 24°14'21.68"E, which leads down to Ombrosgialos Bay (sometimes called "Octopus Bay"). There is no beach but a concrete ramp for boat trailers and the local people go swimming there. During summer a temporary snack bar is sometimes open. Between Palailoni and Drapanos is a track at 35°25'33.09"N 24°14'13.30"E, which leads to the ancient Venetian Wells. These stone-lined, water-filled holes measure several metres in diameter and hold goldfish (and mosquitos).

The roads through Kefalas are narrow in places and, as it is impossible to drive a bus or large vehicle through, work has begun on a bypass road, which runs from Palailoni down the hill to Ksirosterni.

At the southern end of Kefalas is a narrow turning at 35°24'24.29"N 24°14'59.39"E onto a tarmac road, which leads to a small church and graveyard, with views towards the Bay of Georgioupolis.

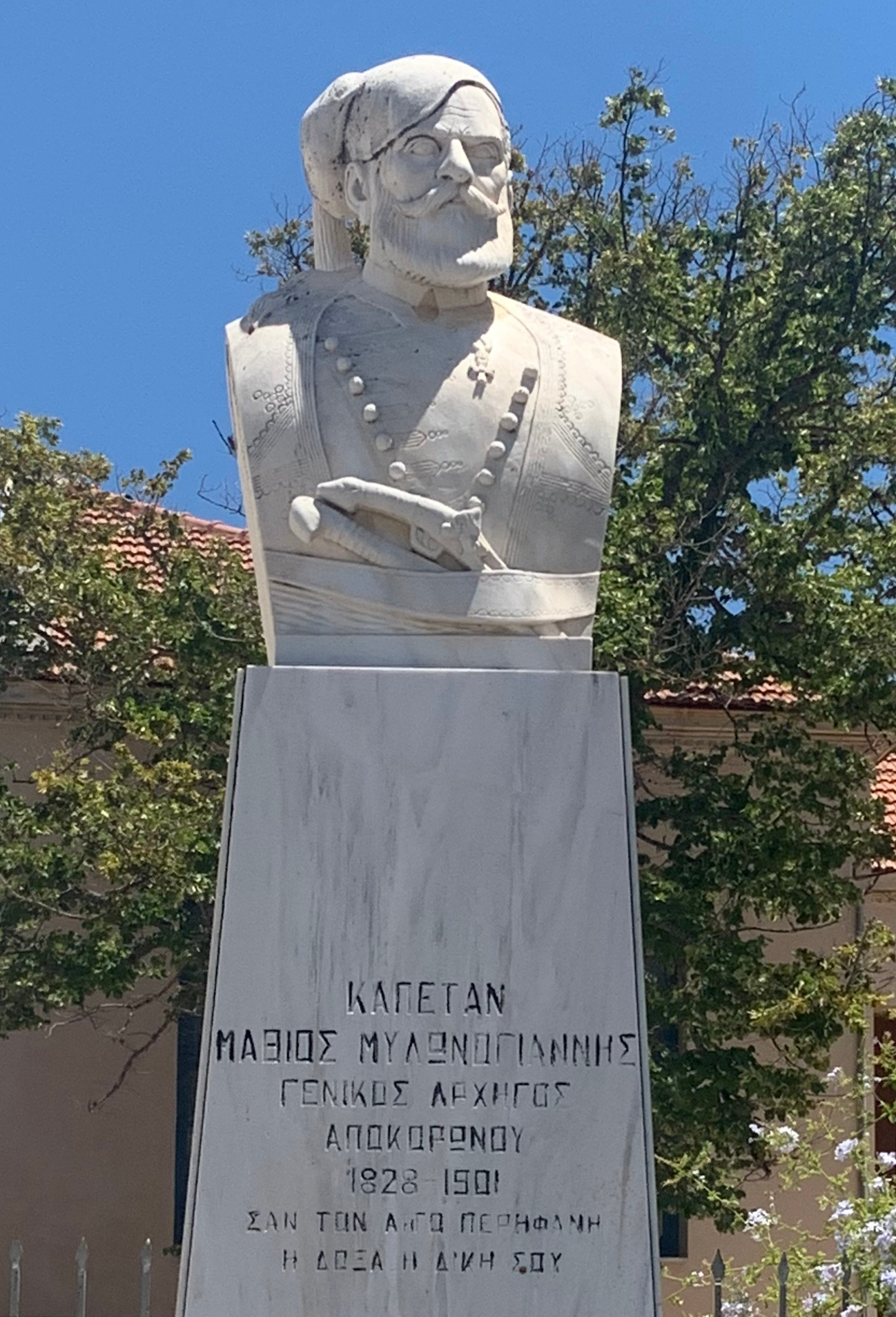

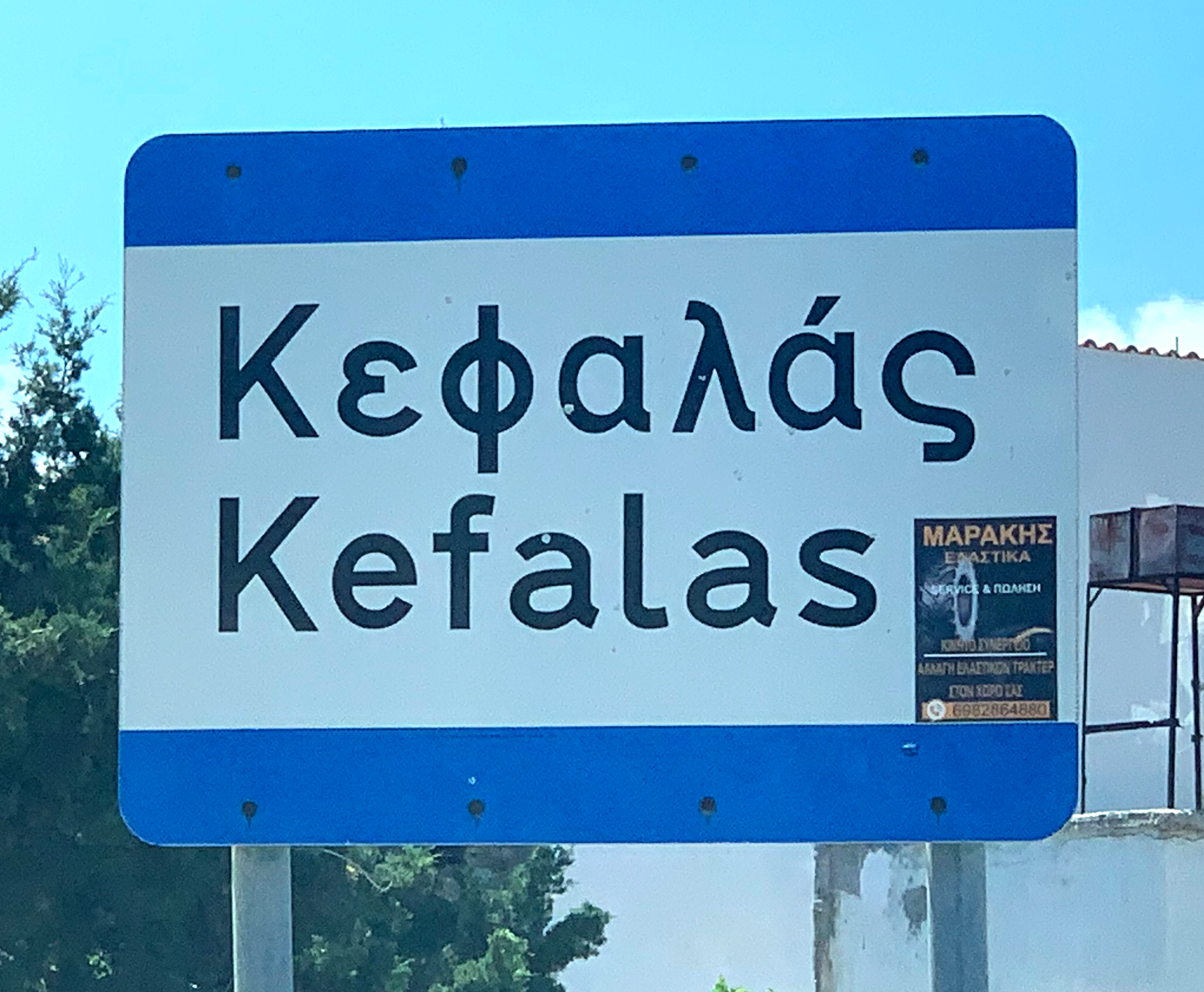

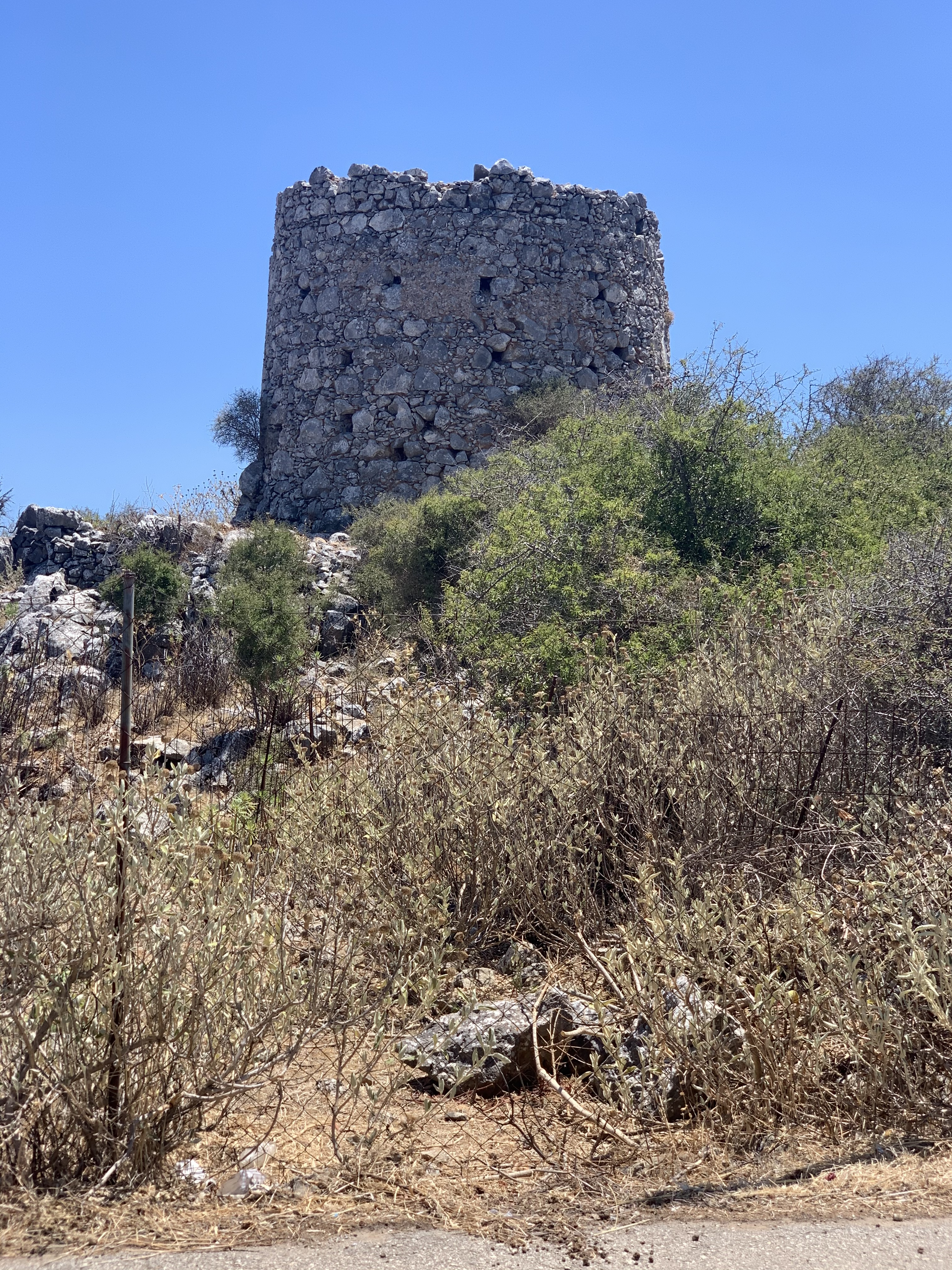
