= Plaka (disambiguation) =

Plaka is an old historical neighbourhood of Athens, Greece.

Plaka or Plakas may also refer to:

== Places ==
- Plaka Bridge, stone one-arch bridge in Greece
- Plaka (Mysia), a town of ancient Mysia, now in Turkey
- Plaka, Achaea
- Plaka, Arcadia, a village in Arcadia
- Plaka, Chania, a village in the Chania regional unit, Crete
- Plaka, Lasithi, a village in Lasithi, Crete
- Plaka, Lemnos, a village in Lemnos, Greece
- Plaka, Milos, the chief town in Greek island Milos
- Plaka, Pieria

== Surname ==
- Christina Plaka (born 1983), comic artist
- Marina Lambraki-Plaka
- Demetra Plakas (born 1960), American musician

== See also ==
- Plaka Pilipino, a Filipino record label of Vicor Music Corporation
