= Drapanos =

Village

Coordinates: 35.435°N 24.23°E

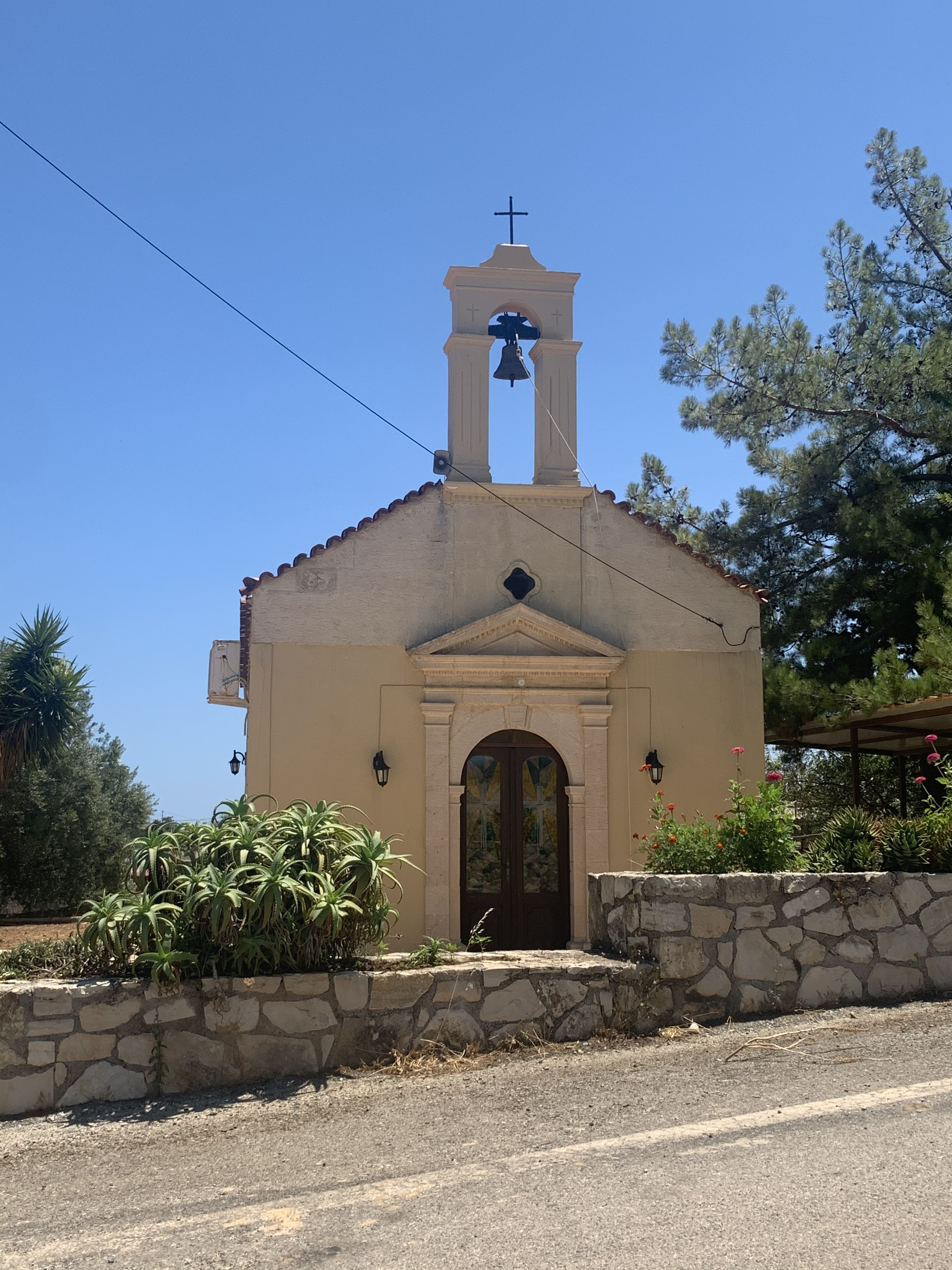
A church in Drapanos

Drapanos is a small, traditional village which is slowly growing, it is high up on Cape Drapano, on the Greek island of Crete in Chania regional unit. It is in the municipality of Apokoronas, and part of the community Kefalas. The village has two tavernas and a small grocery store. Drapanos has mail delivery and is on the Chania bus route (ΚΤΕL). Other services can be found in neighbouring villages such as Plaka or Kefalas, which are only minutes away by car, the nearest beach resort is about ten minutes by car and is called Almyrida.
