= Hydramia =

Coordinates: 35°20′54″N 24°19′03″E

Hydramia (Ancient Greek: Ὑδραμία), or Hydramum or Hydramon (Ὕδραμον), was a town of ancient Crete. According to the Stadiasmus Maris Magni, it was located on the north coast of Crete, 100 stadia east of an unknown location Amphimatrium or Amphimatrion (Άμφιματρίον), probably meaning Amphimalion.

The site of Hydramia is located near modern Dramia.
