= Qurna =

Qurna may refer to:

- Kurna, three village areas near the Theban Hills in Egypt
- al-Qurnah, a city in Iraq
- Battle of Qurna, fought in, Qurna, Iraq
- Lake Kournas, a village and a lake in Crete, Greece
- West Qurna Field, an oil field near Qurna, Iraq
