= Xirosterni =

Xirosterni Ξηροστέρνι
- Community
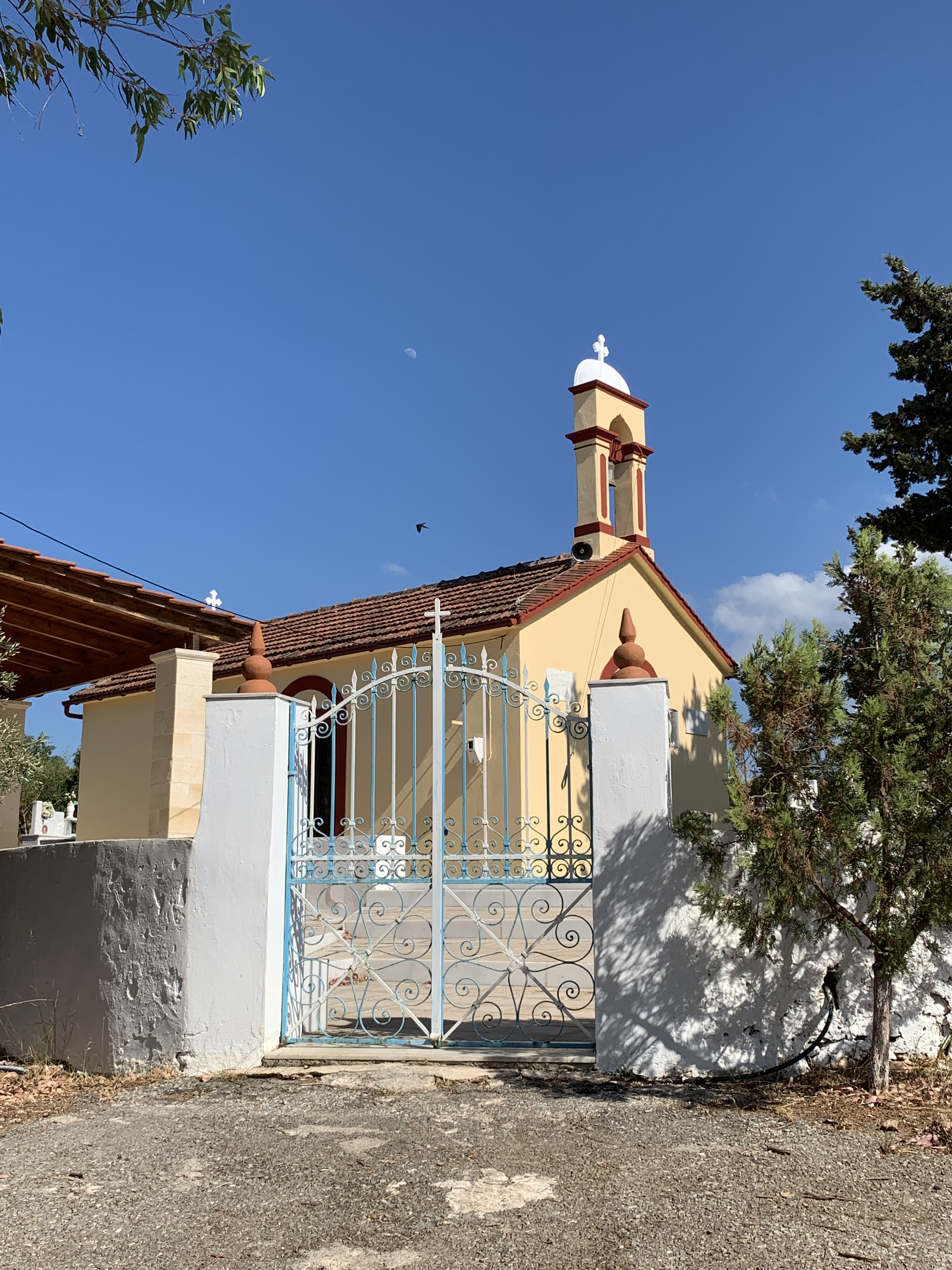
- Church and cemetery near the village of Xirosterni

- Location within Greece
- Coordinates: 35°25′N 24°14′E
- Country: Greece
- Administrative region: Crete
- Regional unit: Chania
- Municipality: Apokoronas
- Municipal unit: Vamos

Population (2021)
  - Community: 221
- Time zone: UTC+2 (EET)
  - Summer (DST): UTC+3 (EEST)

Xirosterni (Greek: Ξηροστέρνι) is a village and a community located in the Apokoronas region close to the northwest coast of the island of Crete, Greece, in Chania regional unit. The community consists of the settlements Xirosterni and Litsarda. It is approximately 25 kilometres (16 mi) from Chania.

== Overview ==
It is a small, traditional village located between Kefalas and Vamos. The village mainly consists of old traditional homes with views of the Cretan White Mountains or the sea. There are no hotels, rental rooms or restaurants here - it is strictly residential. There is however a small café which sometimes serves snacks. The village's previous name was "Viola", which is a Cretan flower. The new name Xirosterni means "dry cistern", or "dry well". During the Ottoman rule a Turk ordered a villager to pull water out of the cistern for his horse to drink. The villager replied that there was no water, to avoid the humiliation of serving the enemy. The Turk then said angrily "why do you call the town Viola? You should call it Xirosterni [Dry cistern]. Every 5th and 6th of August a local festival begins place in which there is Cretan music, dancing and food prepared by the village's people. An old time lyra player (lyra is the main musical instrument in Crete) singing in the town for his friends said: To Xerosterniano nero lene pos ehi avdeles, ma kino to marioliko vgazi omorfous glentzedes, meaning: "They say that the water of Xirosterni has leeches, but this beautiful town gives birth to handsome dancers-singers". Later Nikos Xilouris, a famous singer from Anogia Crete, changed it to: " They say that the water of Xirosterni has leeches, but this beautiful town gives birth to beautiful young women". Every year tourists arrive for the celebration.
