= Corium (Crete) =

Town of ancient Crete

Coordinates: 35°07′38″N 24°39′09″E

Corium or Korion (Ancient Greek: Κόριον) was a town of ancient Crete, near which was a temple to Athena and Lake Koresia (λίμνη Κορησία), which was Crete's only natural freshwater lake.

Its site is located near modern Voulgari Armokastella, Melampes.
