= Agios Nikolaos (Chania) =

Islet on the northern coast of Crete, Greece

Native name: Άγιος Νικόλαος
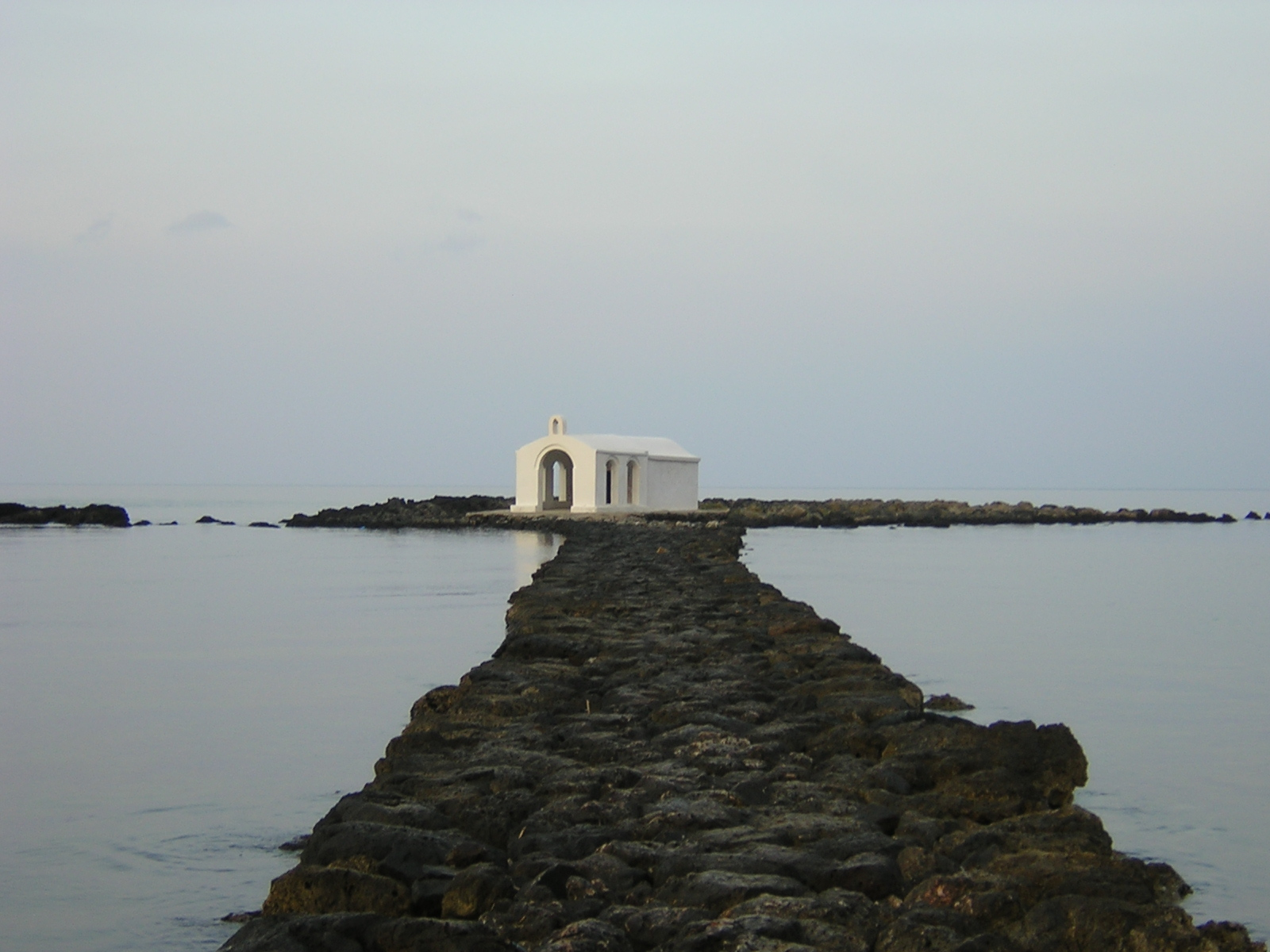
- The church of Agios Nikolaos on the islet of Agios Nikolaos.

- Location within Greece

Geography
- Coordinates: 35.3658°N 24.2637°E
- Archipelago: Cretan Islands

Administration
- Greece
- Region: Crete
- Regional unit: Chania

Demographics
- Population: 0 (2001)

Agios Nikolaos (Greek: Άγιος Νικόλαος, "Saint Nicholas" ) is an islet with a church (Agios Nikolaos) on the northern coast of Crete in the Aegean Sea. Administratively, it is located within the municipality of Georgioupoli, in Chania regional unit.

== See also ==
- List of islands of Greece
