= Kokkino Chorio =

Kokkino Chorio Κόκκινο Χωρίο
- Community
- Location within Greece
- Coordinates: 35°27′14″N 24°13′34″E
- Country: Greece
- Administrative region: Crete
- Regional unit: Chania
- Municipality: Apokoronas
- Municipal unit: Vamos

Population (2021)
  - Community: 191
- Time zone: UTC+2 (EET)
  - Summer (DST): UTC+3 (EEST)

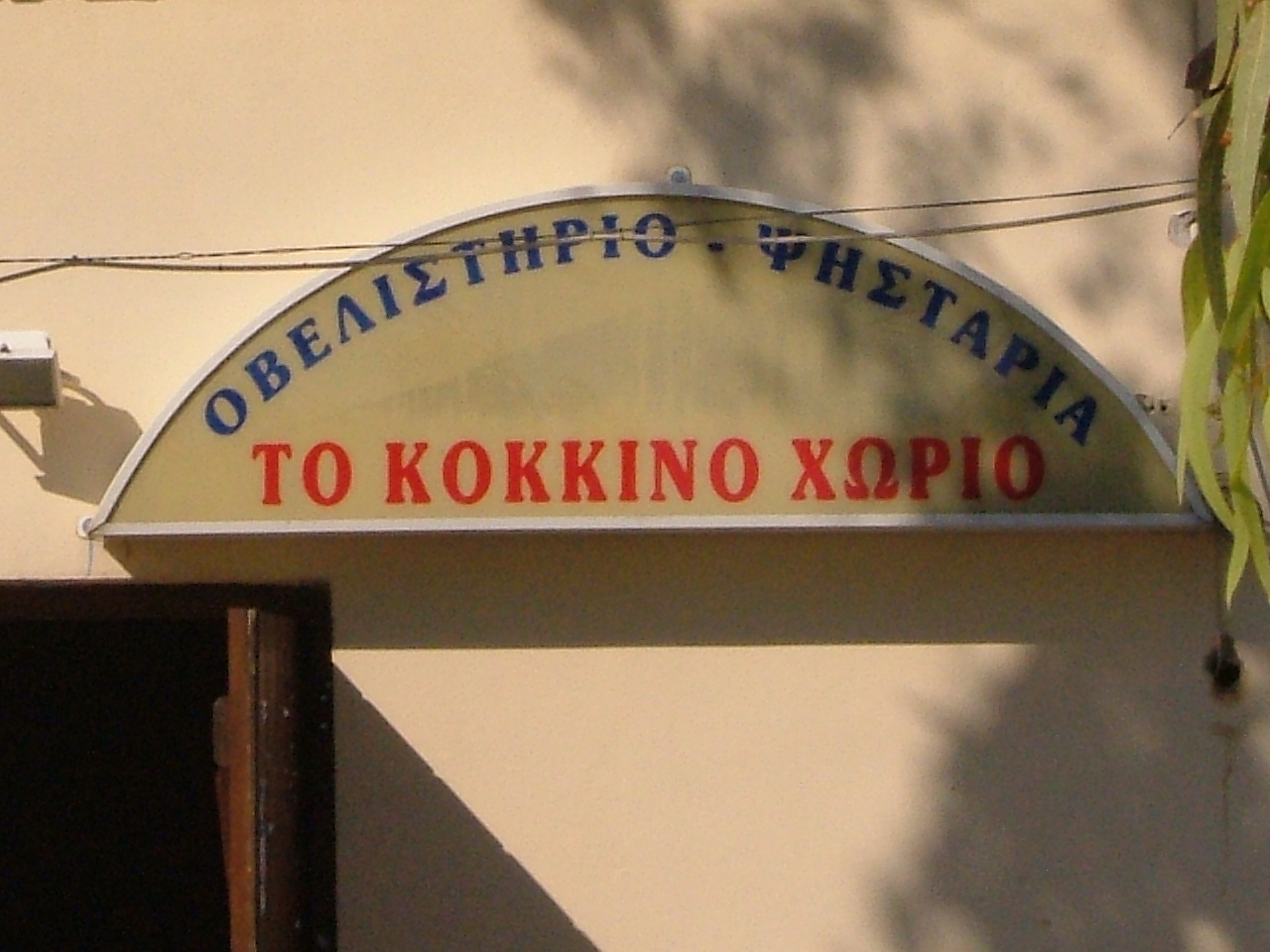
Tavern at Kokkino Chorio

Kokkino Chorio ("Red Village" in English) is a village situated in the Chania regional unit of Crete, Greece.

Kokkino Chorio is located near Plaka, Almyrida, Gavalochori, Kalyves and Kambia.

== History ==
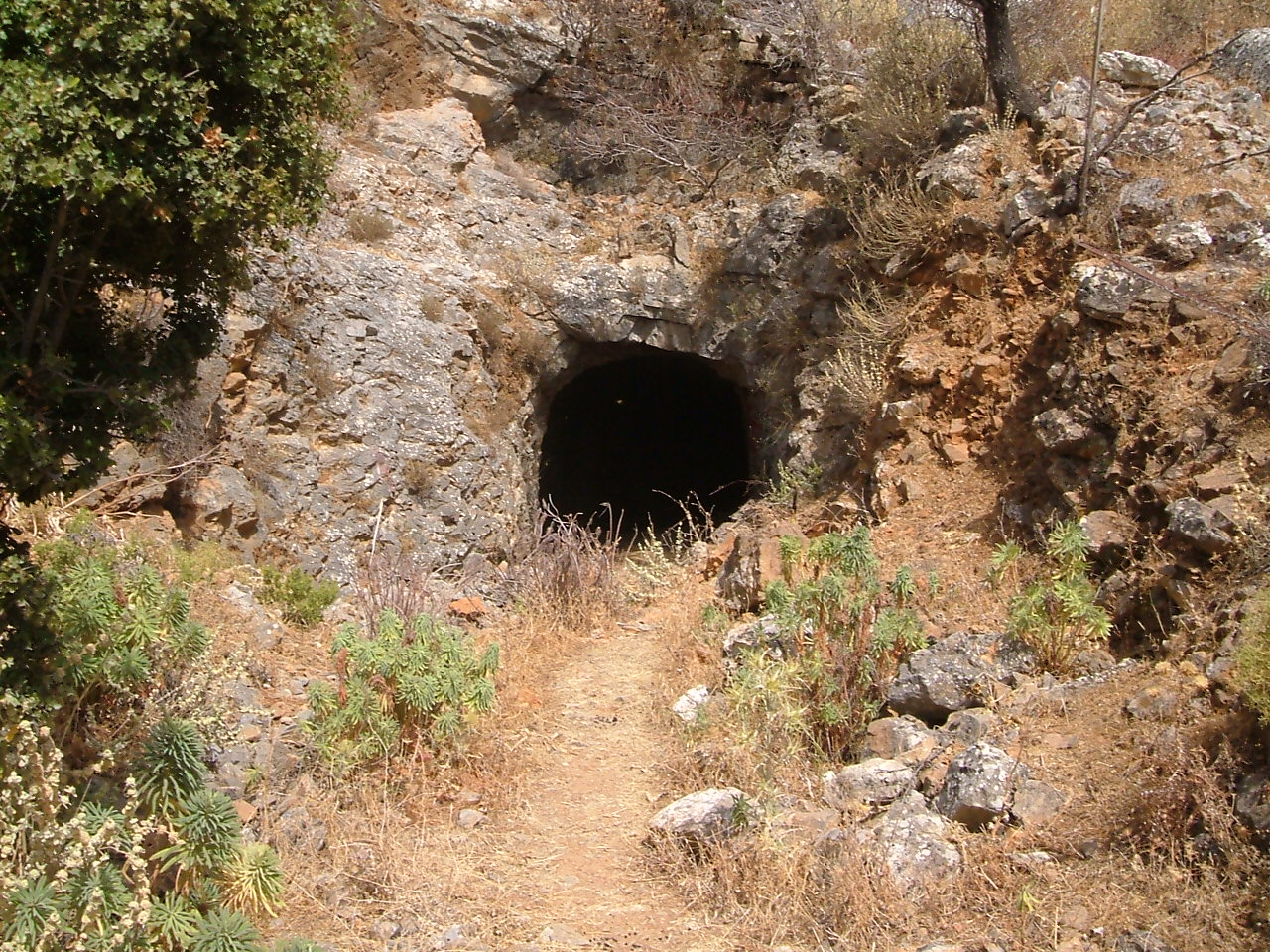
Cave at Kokkino Chorio

The village also plays host to a tunnel complex which was used in World War II by the Nazis as an artillery spotting position. The area has been bought by a local property developer who has subsequently built a large number of houses on the site, obliterating in the process an old gun emplacement. In 2006 a memorial to those killed during world war two was constructed at the entrance to the tunnels. Access to the cave is possible, but there is no interior lighting.

== Culture ==
It was the filming location of the 1964 film Zorba the Greek starring Anthony Quinn, Alan Bates, Irene Papas and many locals.

== Description ==
Kokkino Chorio has three churches: St. George's which is located at the entrance of the cave and used on St. George's Day (April 23); St Katherines in the village which is used on November 25. The main church, used weekly and at other times during Lent/Easter and Advent/Christmas is St. Haralambos and is located in the village square.

Recently a Mini Market has opened in Kokkino Chorio (run by Giorgos) selling a range of goods, from food to household appliances.

There is also a Glass blowing factory in the village with an embryo taverna attached.

Above Kokkino Horio one can see the strangely shaped hill Drapanokefala or Calapodha (so named during the Venetian occupation). The coastline northwest of the village is an extremely interesting place for a stroll due to the ground formation and the caves, such as the cave of Petsi (or Karavotopos). Another cave called Katalimata, located at the centre of the village, is also an interesting site.
