= Kournas, Chania =

Kournas Κουρνάς
- Community
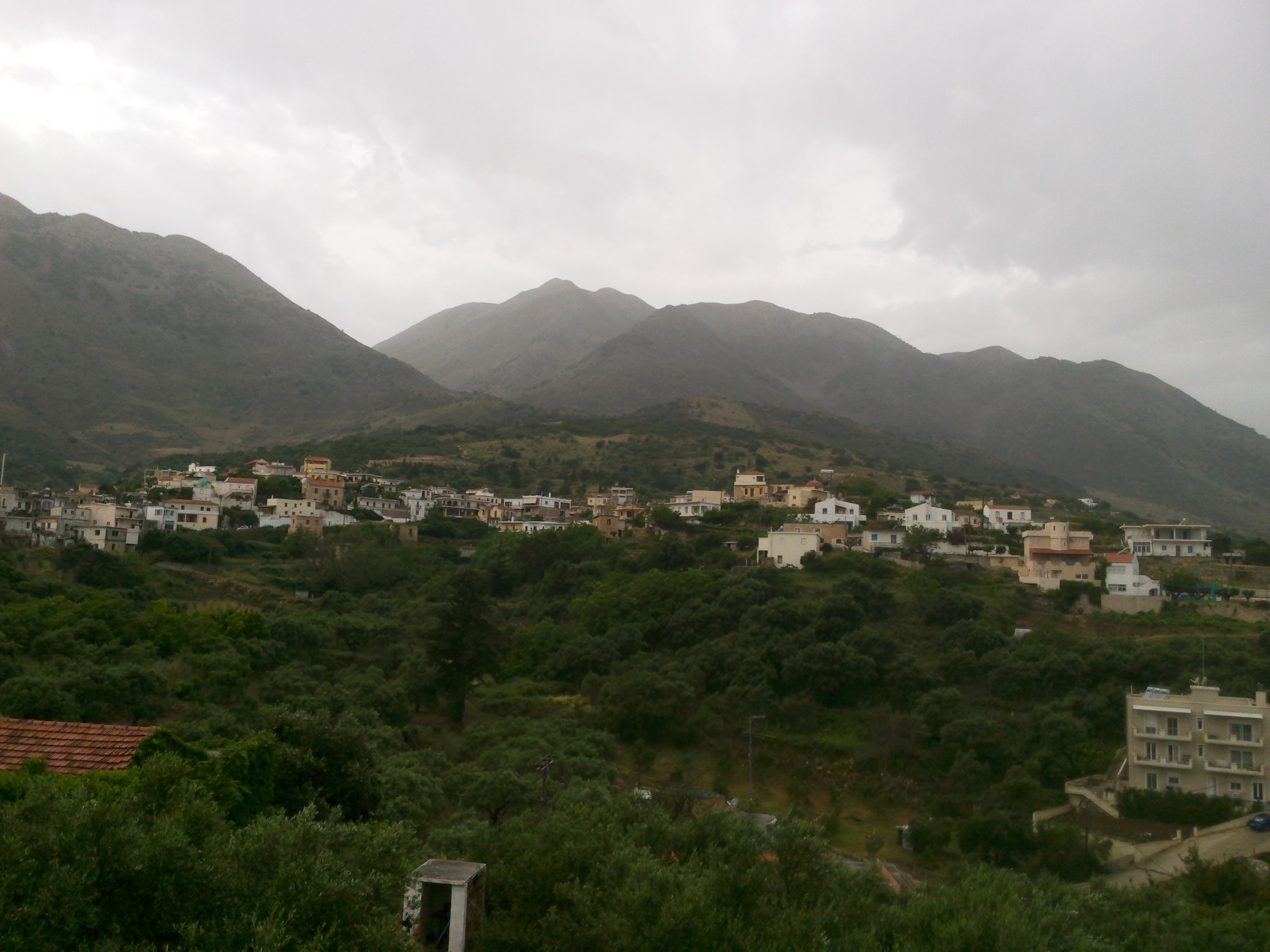
- South view of Kournas

- Location within Greece
- Coordinates: 35°19′N 24°18′E
- Country: Greece
- Administrative region: Crete
- Regional unit: Chania
- Municipality: Apokoronas
- Municipal unit: Kryonerida

Population (2021)
  - Community: 1,038
- Time zone: UTC+2 (EET)
  - Summer (DST): UTC+3 (EEST)

Kournas is a mountainous village and a community of the Municipality of Apokoronas, Chania, on the Greek island of Crete. It has a population of 1,038 citizens (2021). It is located at 200 meters altitude and south-east of the mountain named Dafnomadara (1680 meters).

Kournas is a fairly large village perched on a hill overlooking Lake Kournas. It was in the former Georgioupoli municipality, not far from the town of the same name. A working village which has seen less depopulation than some of its neighbours, Kournas is known for its pottery and many popular taverns.
