= Lake Kournas =

Lake in Crete, Greece

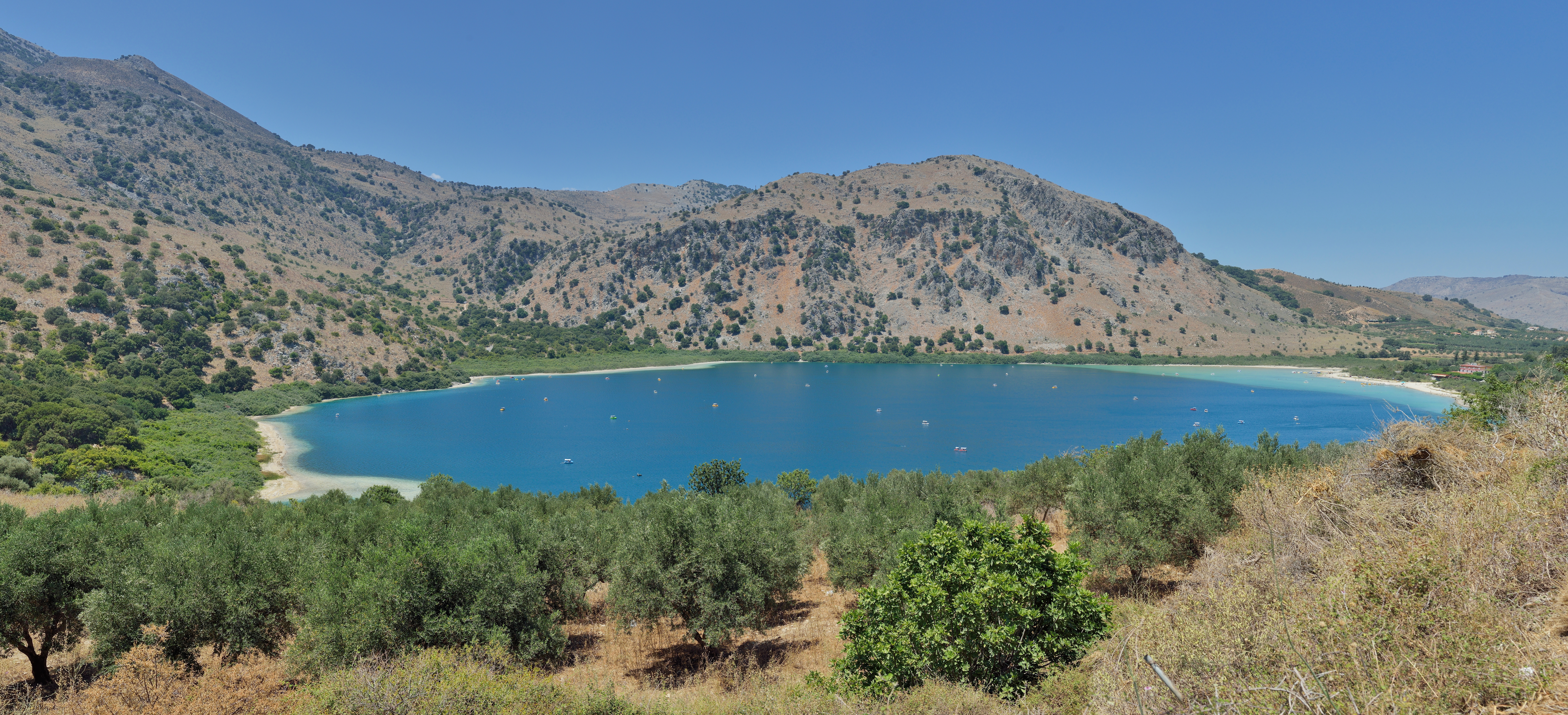

- Location within Greece
- Location: Crete
- Coordinates: 35°19′51″N 24°16′32″E
- Type: alkali
- Basin countries: Greece

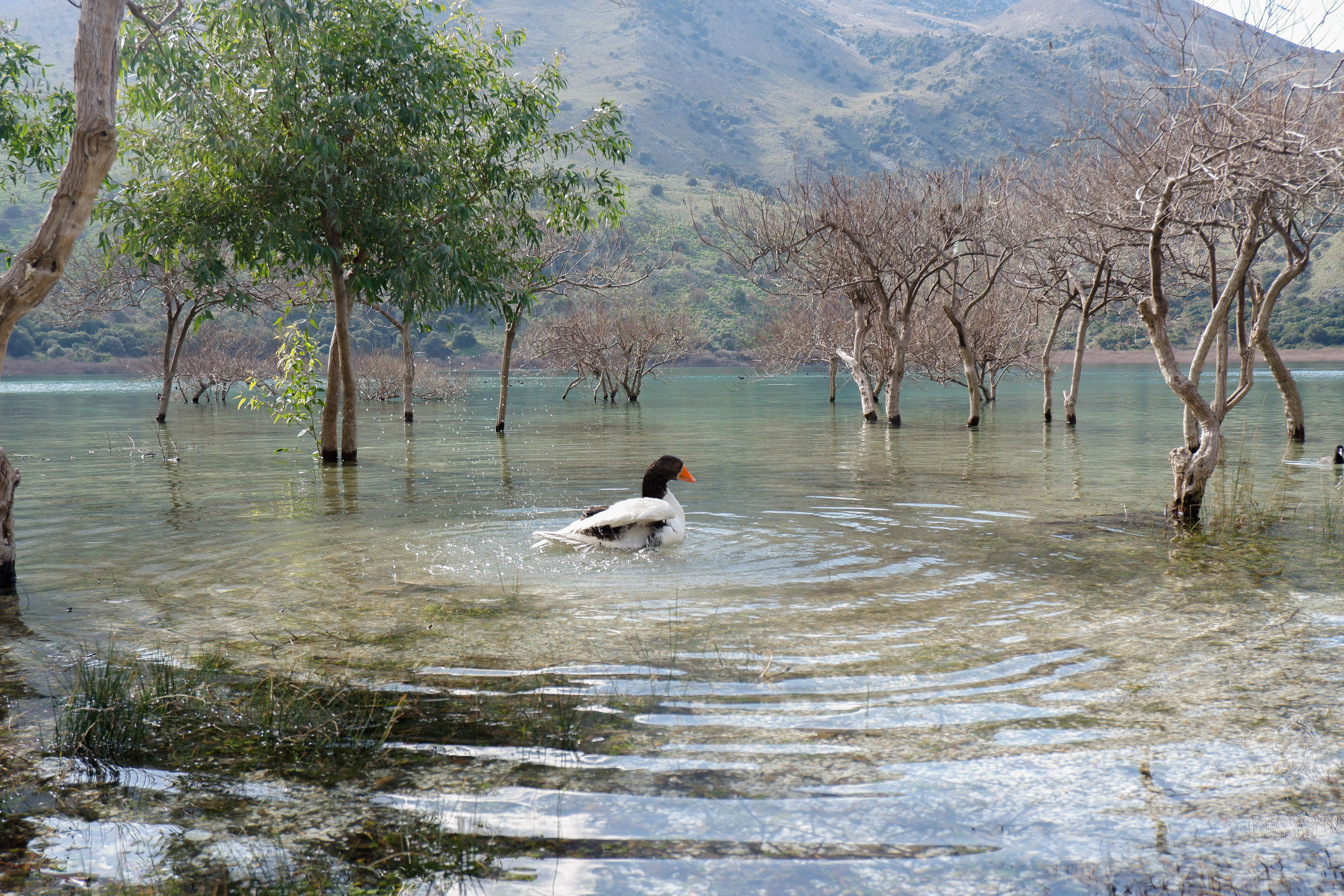
Duck on the lake

Lake Kournas is a lake on the island of Crete, Greece, near the village of Kournas. It is in the Apokoronas municipality of Chania regional unit close to the border with Rethymno regional unit, 47 km from the town of Chania. Kournas is a fairly large village perched on a hill overlooking the lake.

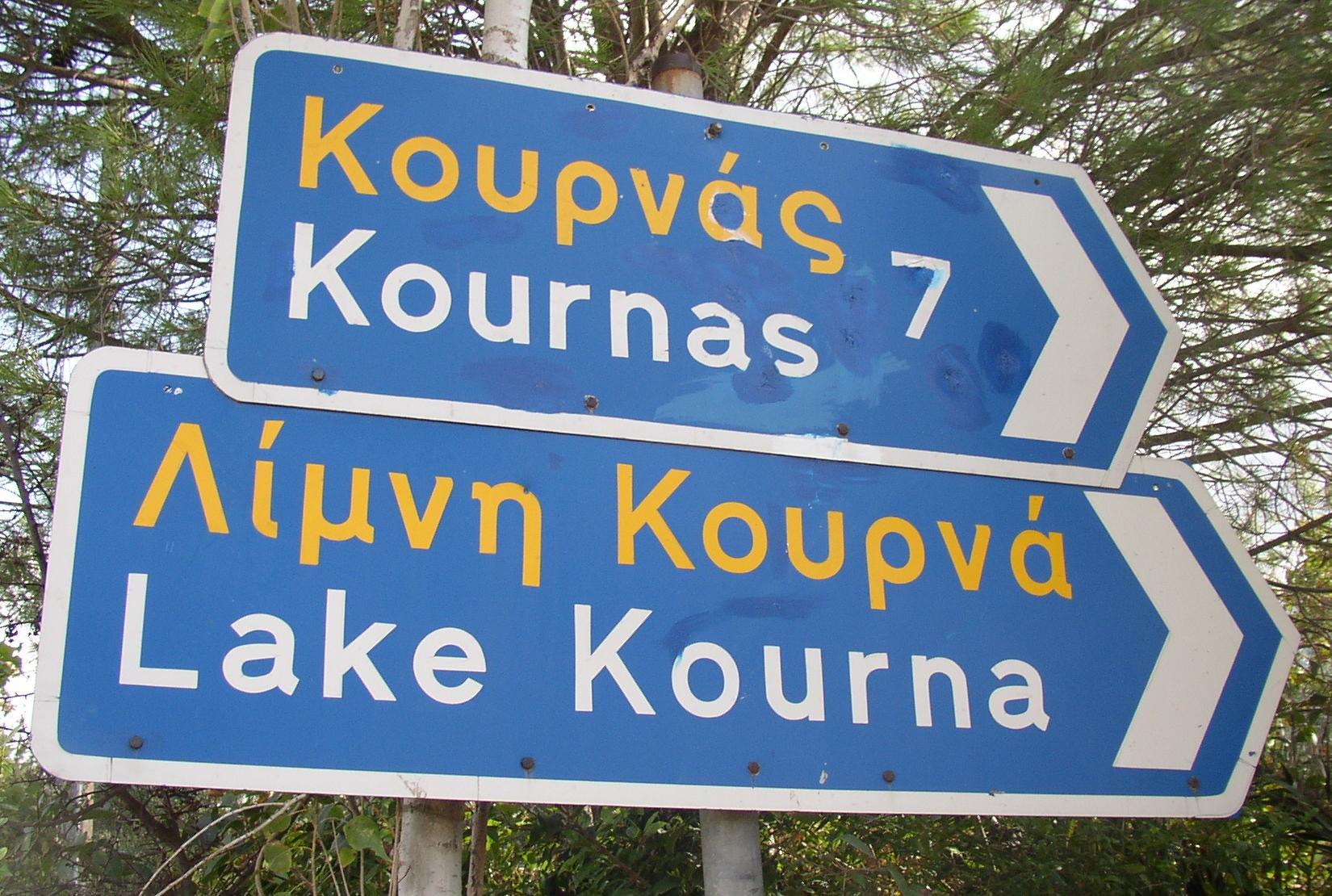
Road sign

Crete's only freshwater lake, Lake Kournas, is relatively large, with a perimeter of 3.5 km. There is a nature preserve on the Southwest side of the lake. There is a rustic road from the North of the lake to the Hills on the West of the lake.

The lake used to be called Koresia after ancient Korion, a city thought to be in the area with a temple to Athena. The lake used to contain eels but now is better known for its terrapins and tourism. Tavernas and pedalo rental shops are located along part of the lake's shore.
