= Georgioupoli =

Georgioupoli Γεωργιούπολη
- Municipal unit
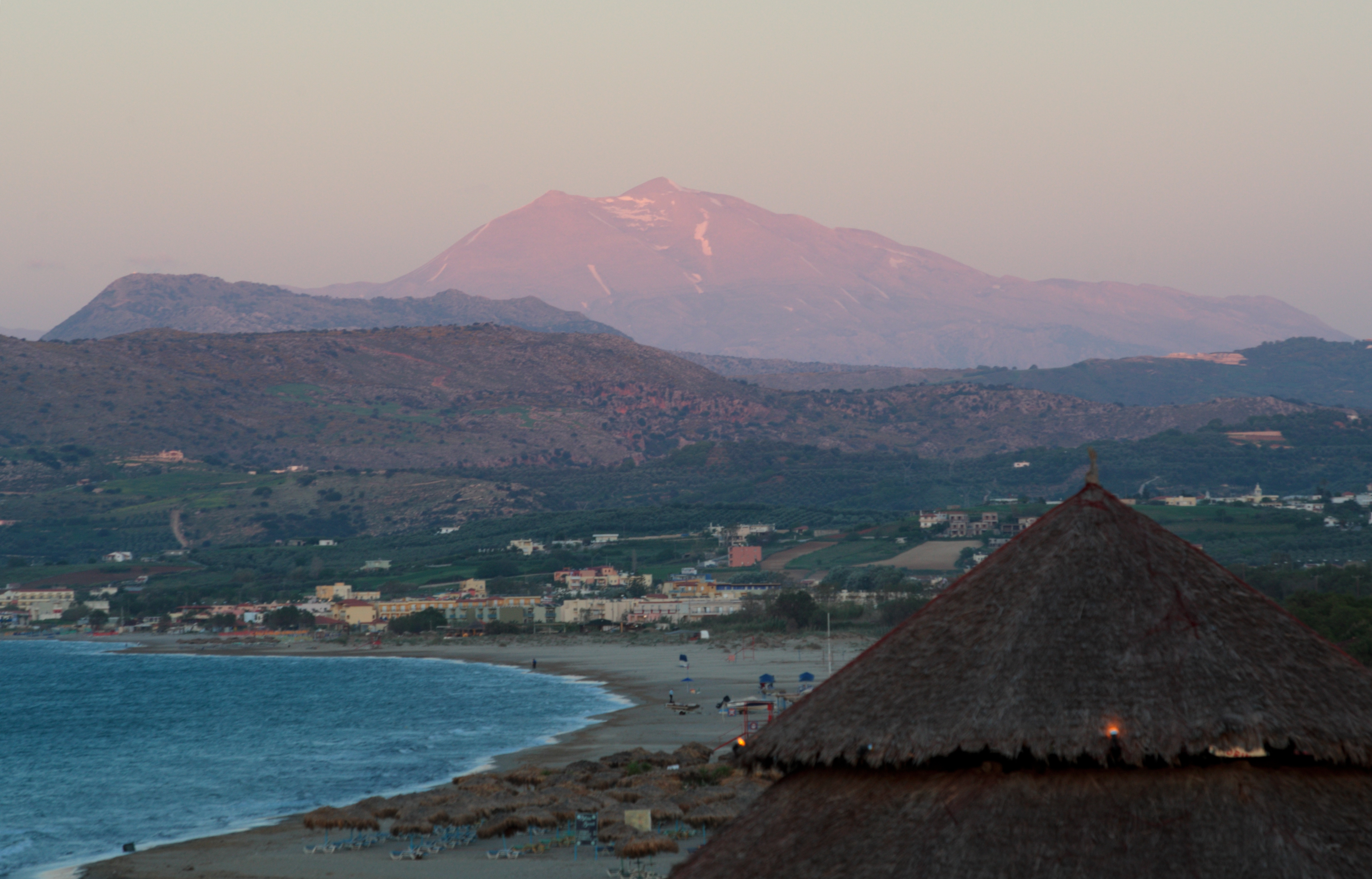
- View of Georgioupoli and Mount Psiloritis

- Location within the regional unit

- Location within Greece
- Coordinates: 35°21′N 24°15′E
- Country: Greece
- Administrative region: Crete
- Regional unit: Chania
- Municipality: Apokoronas

Area
  - Municipal unit: 53.5 km^{2} (20.7 sq mi)
- Elevation: 22 m (72 ft)

Population (2021)
  - Municipal unit: 2,708
  - Municipal unit density: 50.6/km^{2} (131/sq mi)
  - Community: 840
- Time zone: UTC+2 (EET)
  - Summer (DST): UTC+3 (EEST)
- Postal code: 730 07
- Area code: 28250, 28253
- Vehicle registration: ΧΝ, XB
- Website: www.georgioupolis.gov.gr

Georgioupoli (Greek: Γεωργιούπολη) is a resort village and former municipality in the Chania regional unit, Crete, Greece. Since the 2011 local government reform it is part of the municipality Apokoronas, of which it is a municipal unit. The municipal unit has an area of 53.498 km^{2} (20.656 sq mi). It is located 39 kilometres (24 miles) east of Chania, about 23 km (14 mi) west of Rethymno and about 100 km (62 mi) west of Heraklio. It was named after Prince George of Greece, high commissioner of the island in the last years of Ottoman occupation.

== Geography ==
Georgioupolis is found at the apex of Almiros Bay on the Sea of Crete, with Cape Drapano and its rocky coast to the north and the long sandy beaches towards Rethimno in the east, just 20 km (12 mi) away. Three rivers meet the sea at the village; the largest, Almiros, creates a small harbour for fishing and tourist boats. The entrance to the village on the old road from Vrisses is a long avenue of eucalyptus trees.

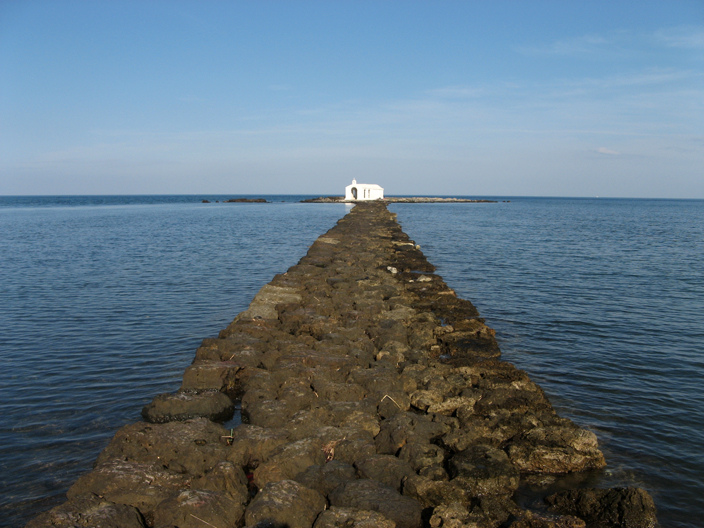
Agios Nikolaos church

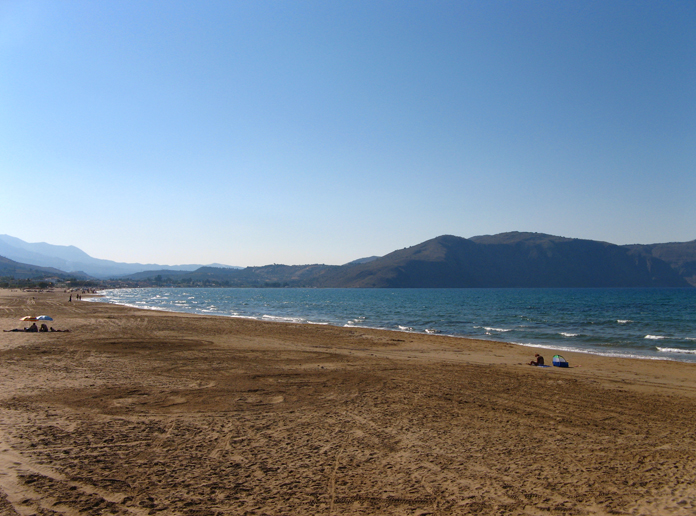
Georgioupolis beach

Formerly a small fishing village, Georgioupolis is very much a tourist town now, with many cafés, tavernas and small hotels and apartment blocks. The town square is surrounded by outdoor seating used by tourists enjoying their drinks and ice creams. The 9 km (6 mi) beach is the main attraction of the area, with Kalyvaki beach on the other side of the river as well. Nearby Lake Kournas is also a popular excursion by foot, bicycle or tourist 'train'. Georgioupolis is a well-located base for exploring the traditional villages of the area towards Vamos or into the White Mountains to the south.

Archaeological evidence points to Georgioupoli as the site of ancient Amphimalla (Amfimala or Amfimalion), the port of Lappa, a classical city at modern Argyroupoli.

== Municipal unit ==
Georgioupolis, with 513 residents at the 2001 census, is the largest village of the municipal unit of the same name, covering several other villages inland as far as Kournas. The town hall of Georgioupoli municipality is at Kavros-Kournas. The mayor until 2006 was Georgios Papadakis. Ferdinandos Marikakis was elected as mayor on 15 October 2006. The office was renamed "Deputy Mayor" at the 2010 elections, at which time the office was won by Iosifis (Joseph) "Sifi" Stavroulakis. Since August 2012, he has also held responsibility for all sewerage works in the Apokoronas region.

In 2010 the new Kalikratis plan was introduced, bringing all municipalities in Apokoronas, including Georgioupoli, together. On 14 November 2010 Grigoris Markakis was elected mayor of Apokoronas, at the head of the DEKA party, winning after the second round of voting.

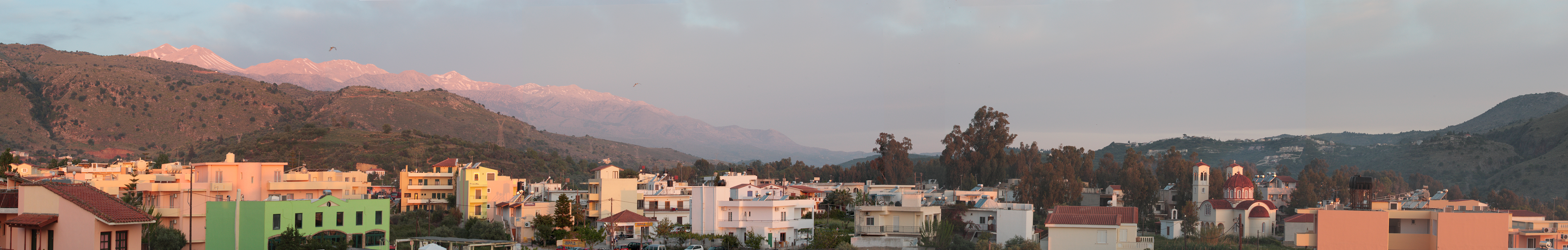
Sunrise over Georgioupoli and Lefka Ori (White Mountains)

== Historical population ==
Year	Community population	Municipal unit population
1991	616	-
2001	772	2,414
2011	936	2,749
2021	840	2,708

== Notable residents ==
- Priest Demetrios of Agioi Isidoroi Church Athens: from Argyromouri, Exopoli

== International relations ==
=== Twin towns – sister cities ===
Georgioupoli is twinned with:

- - Kärdla, Hiiumaa, Estonia

== See also ==
- List of settlements in the Chania regional unit
