= Amphimalla =

Coordinates: 35°21′51″N 24°15′35″E

Amphimalla (Greek: Ἀμφίμαλλα, Strabo p. 475; Plin. iv. 20) or Amphimalion (Greek: Ἀμφιμάλιον, Steph. B. s. v.), was an ancient town on the north coast of Crete, Greece, situated on the bay named after it (Ἀμφιμαλὴς κόλπος Ptol. iii. 17. § 7), which corresponds, according to some, to the Almyros Bay (Armiro), and, according to others, to Suda Bay.

The site of Amphimalla has not been located with precision; although the editors of the Barrington Atlas of the Greek and Roman World choose the Bay of Almyros, and place Amphimalla at its extreme southwest corner approximately on the site of the modern town of Georgioupoli, in Chania regional unit.
