= Plaka, Chania =

Regional village

Plaka Πλάκα
- Community
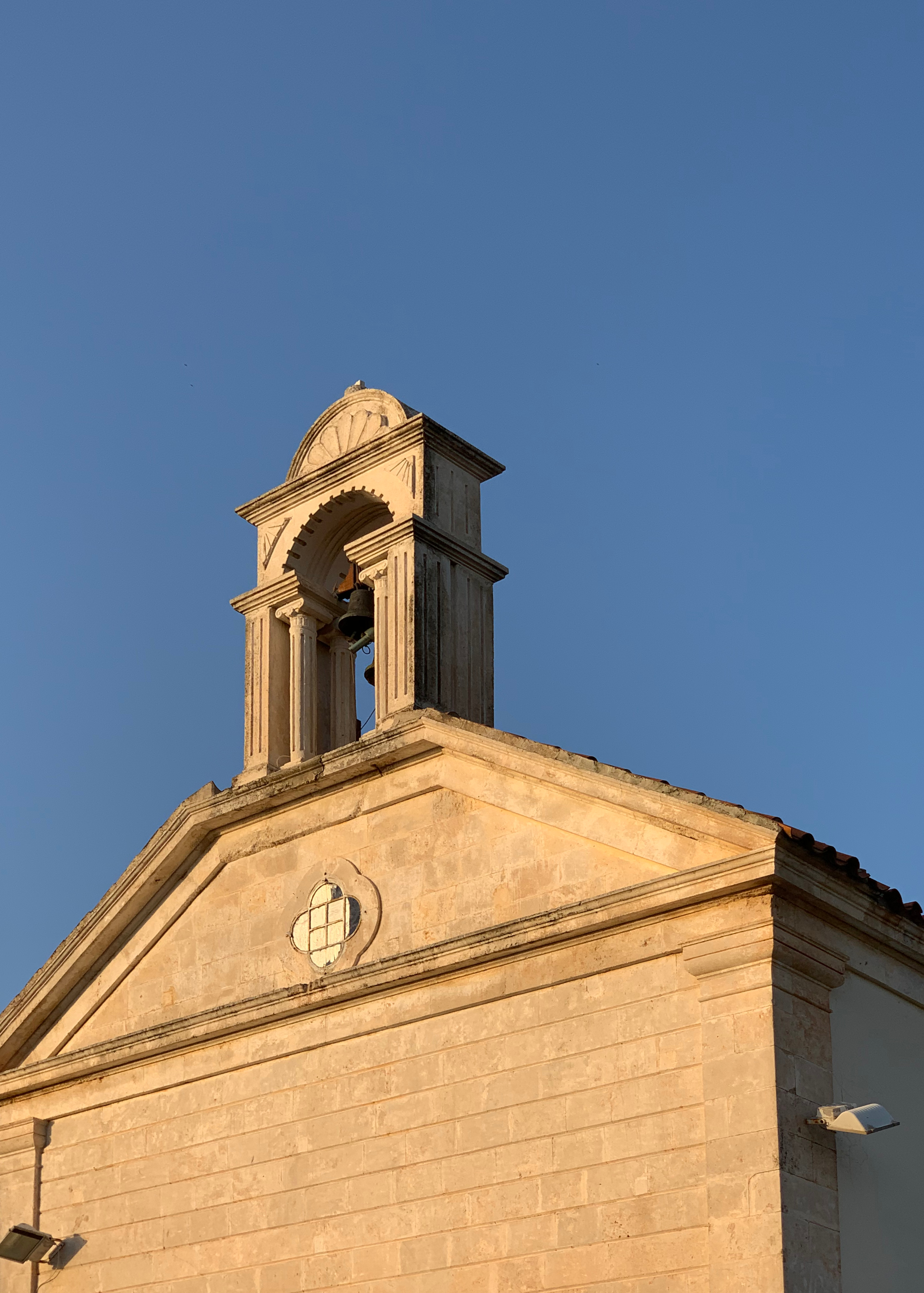
- Bell tower of the church

- Location within Greece
- Coordinates: 35°27′07″N 24°12′36″E
- Country: Greece
- Administrative region: Crete
- Regional unit: Chania
- Municipality: Apokoronas
- Municipal unit: Vamos

Population (2021)
  - Community: 538
- Time zone: UTC+2 (EET)
  - Summer (DST): UTC+3 (EEST)

Plaka is a village located in the Apokoronas region of the northwest coast of the island of Crete, Greece. It is located in Chania regional unit. Plaka is two kilometres from Almyrida, a resort which it overlooks. Situated high up the hill there are views over the Mediterranean Sea.

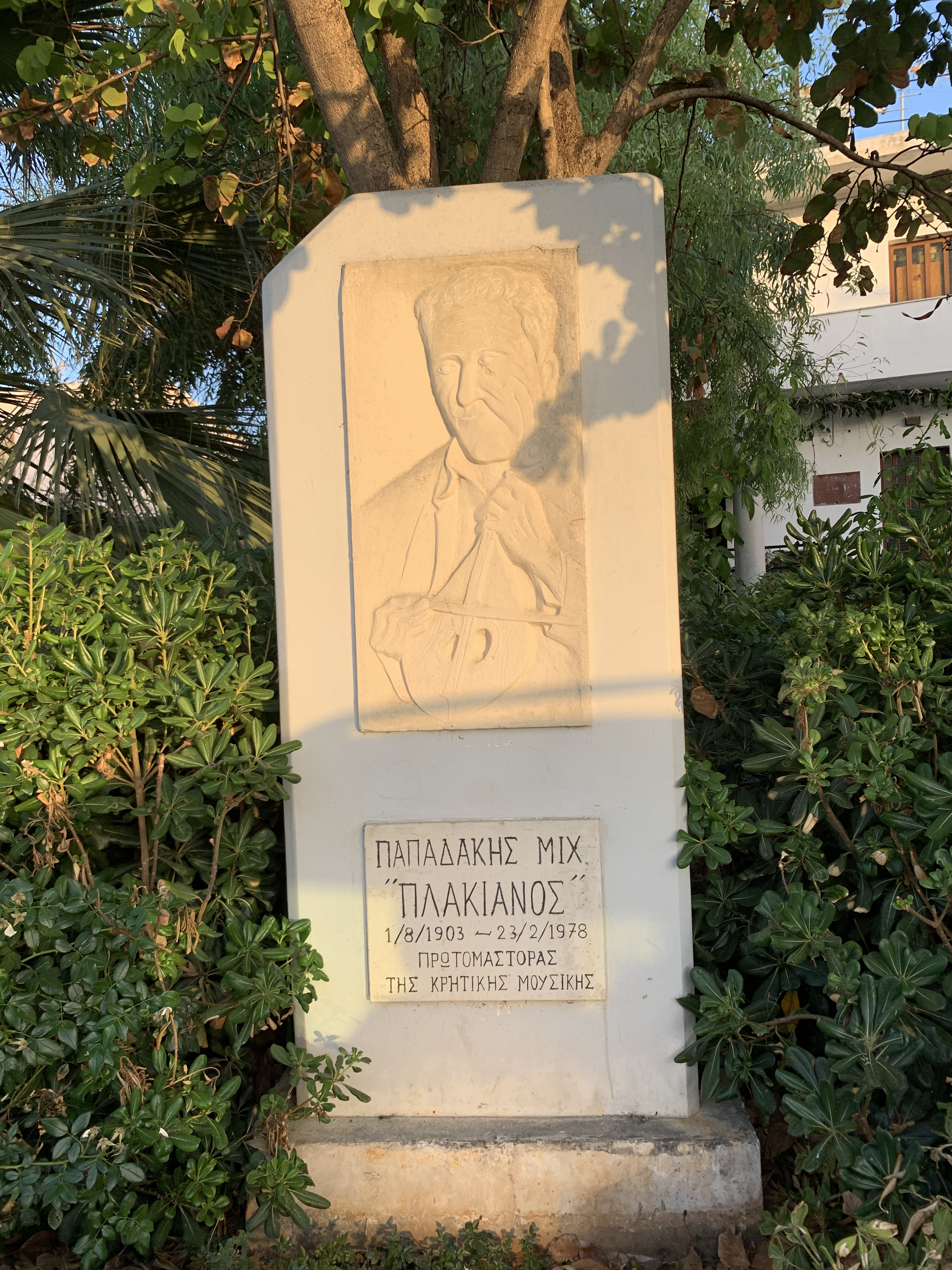
Stele to Michalis Papadakis "Plakianos".

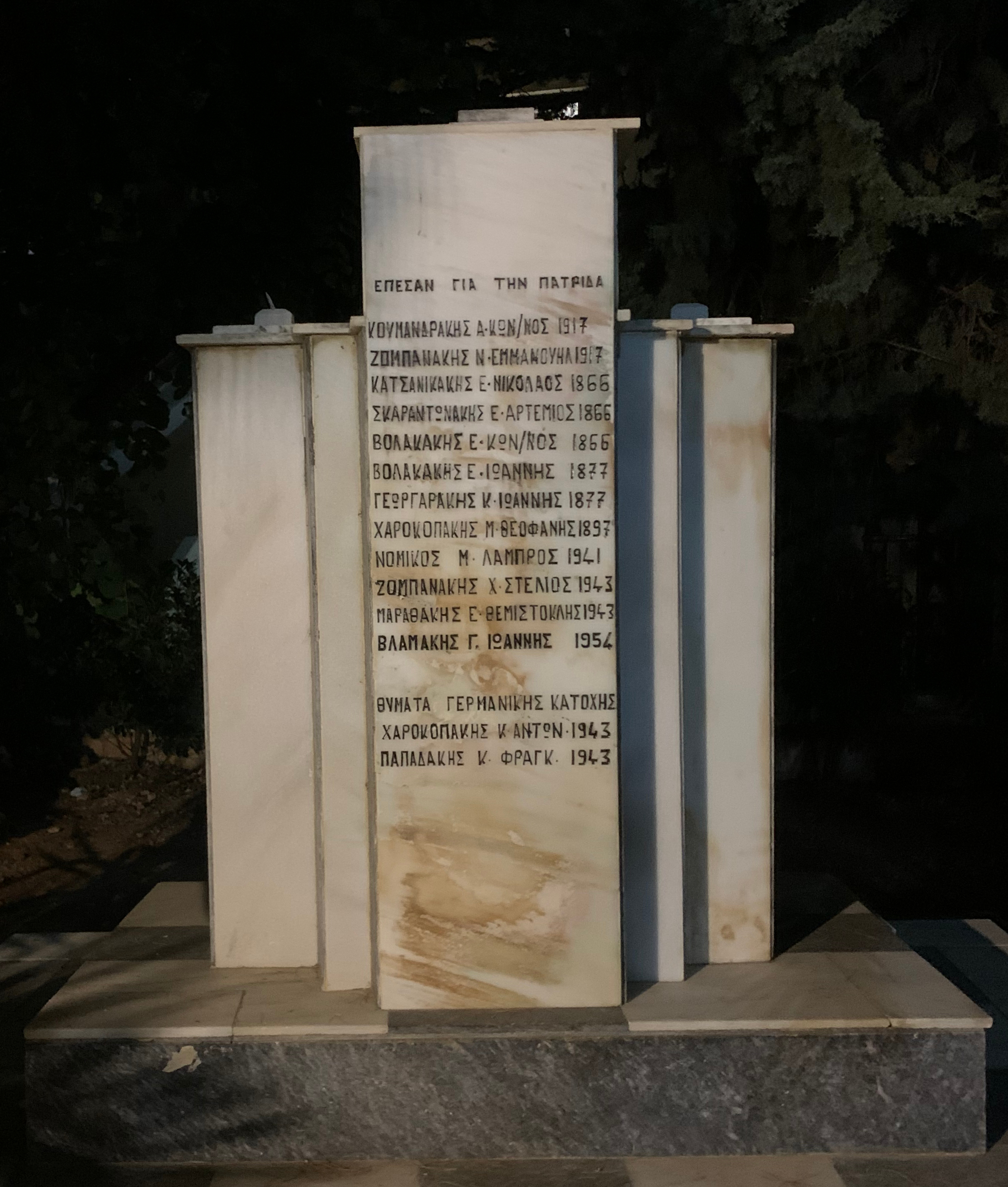
War memorial.
