= Almyrida =

Human settlement in Greece

Coordinates: 35°26′56.69″N 24°12′2.72″E

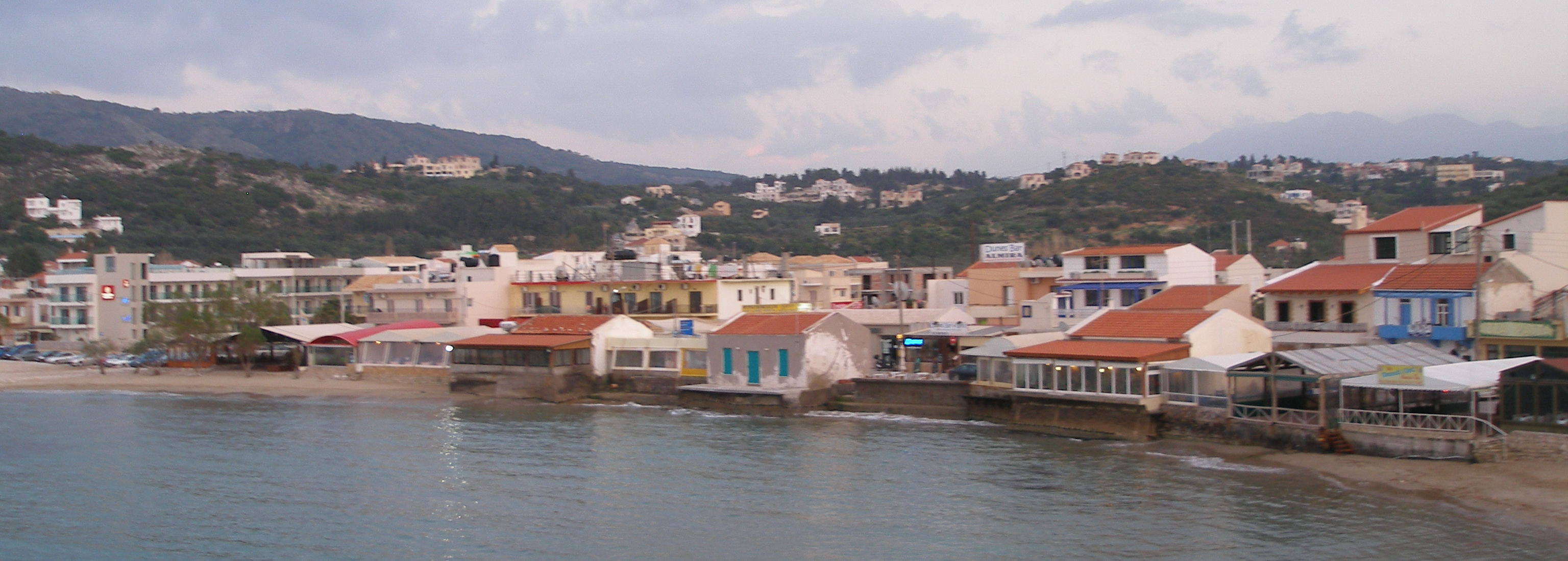
View of Almiryda

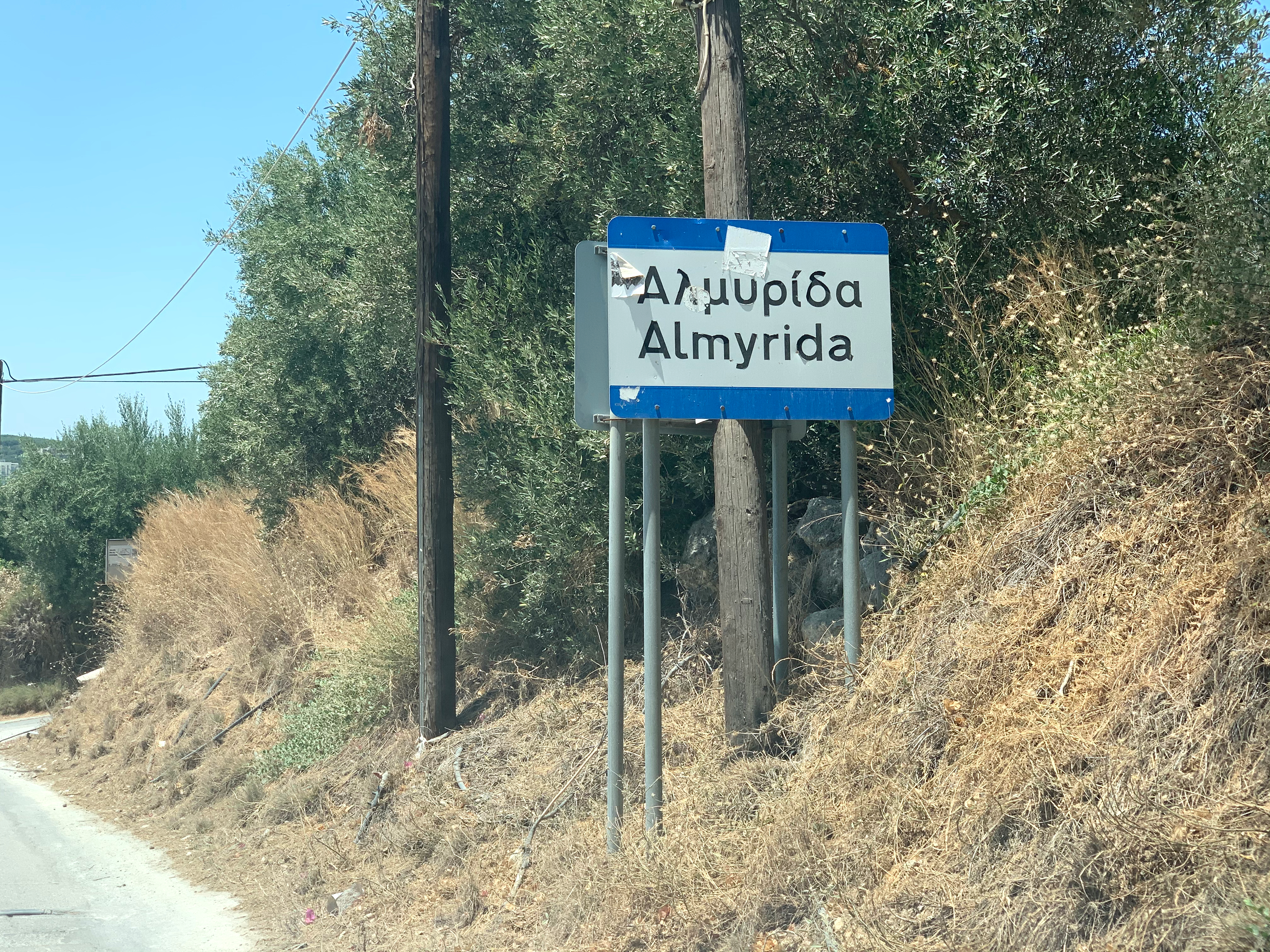
City limit sign

Almyrida (Greek: Αλμυρίδα, Almyrída, [almiˈɾiða]) is a seaside resort village located in the municipality of Apokoronas on the northwest coast of the island of Crete, Greece. The village is approximately 20 kilometers from Chania, in the Chania regional unit. Traditionally a fishing village, Almyrida has a long beach.
