= Eleutherna =

Archaeological site in Crete, Greece

Coordinates: 35°19′14.53″N 24°39′51.52″E

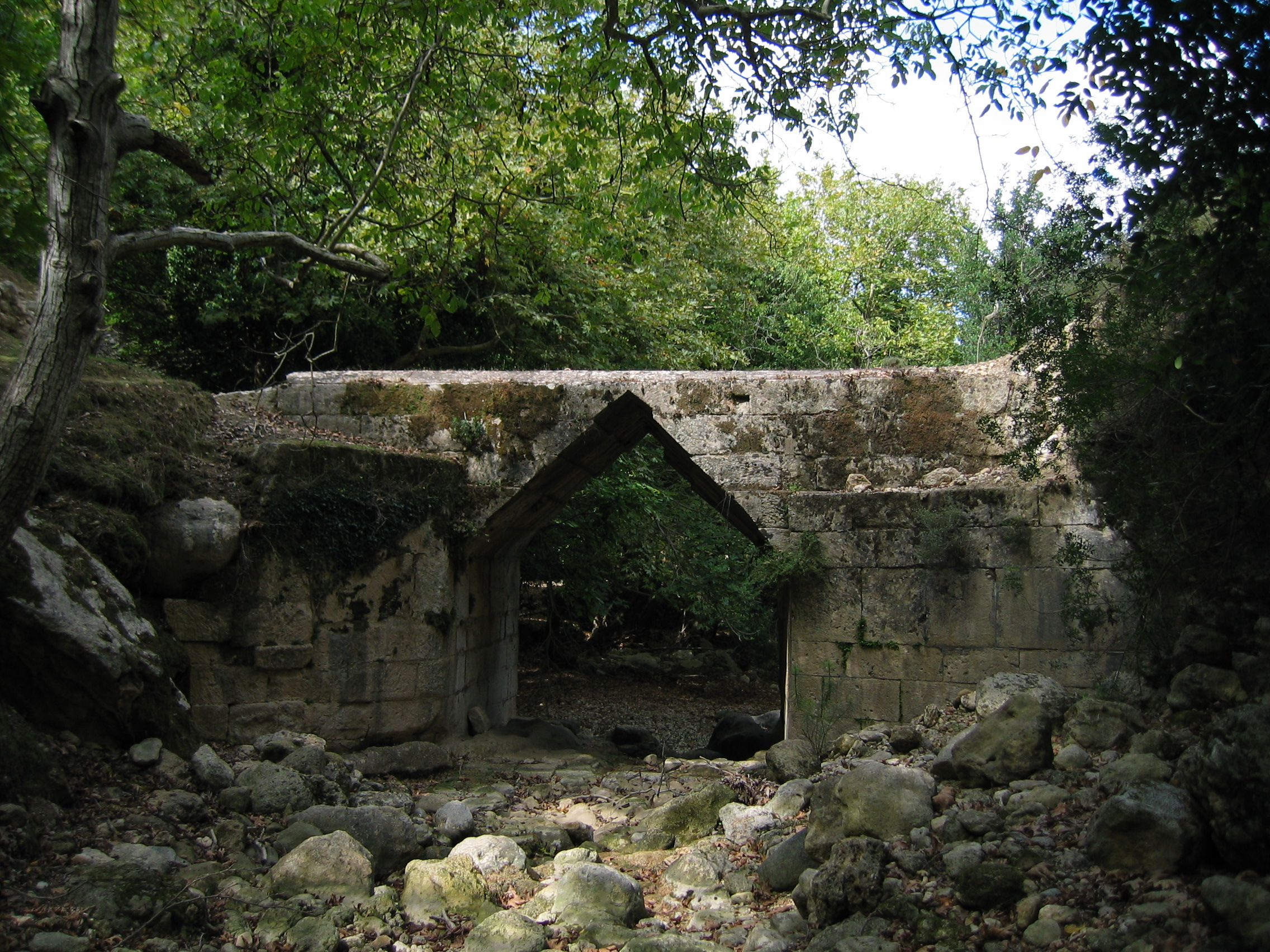
The Hellenistic Bridge close to the ancient city

Eleutherna (Ancient Greek: Ἐλεύθερνα), also called Apollonia (Ancient Greek: Ἀπολλωνία), was an ancient city-state in Crete, Greece, which lies 25 km southeast of Rethymno in Rethymno regional unit. Archaeologists excavated the site, located on a narrow northern spur of Mount Ida, the highest mountain in Crete. The site is about 1 km south of modern town of Eleftherna, about 8 km north east of Moni Arkadiou, in the current municipality of Rethymno. It flourished from the Dark Ages of Greece's early history until Byzantine times.

== History ==
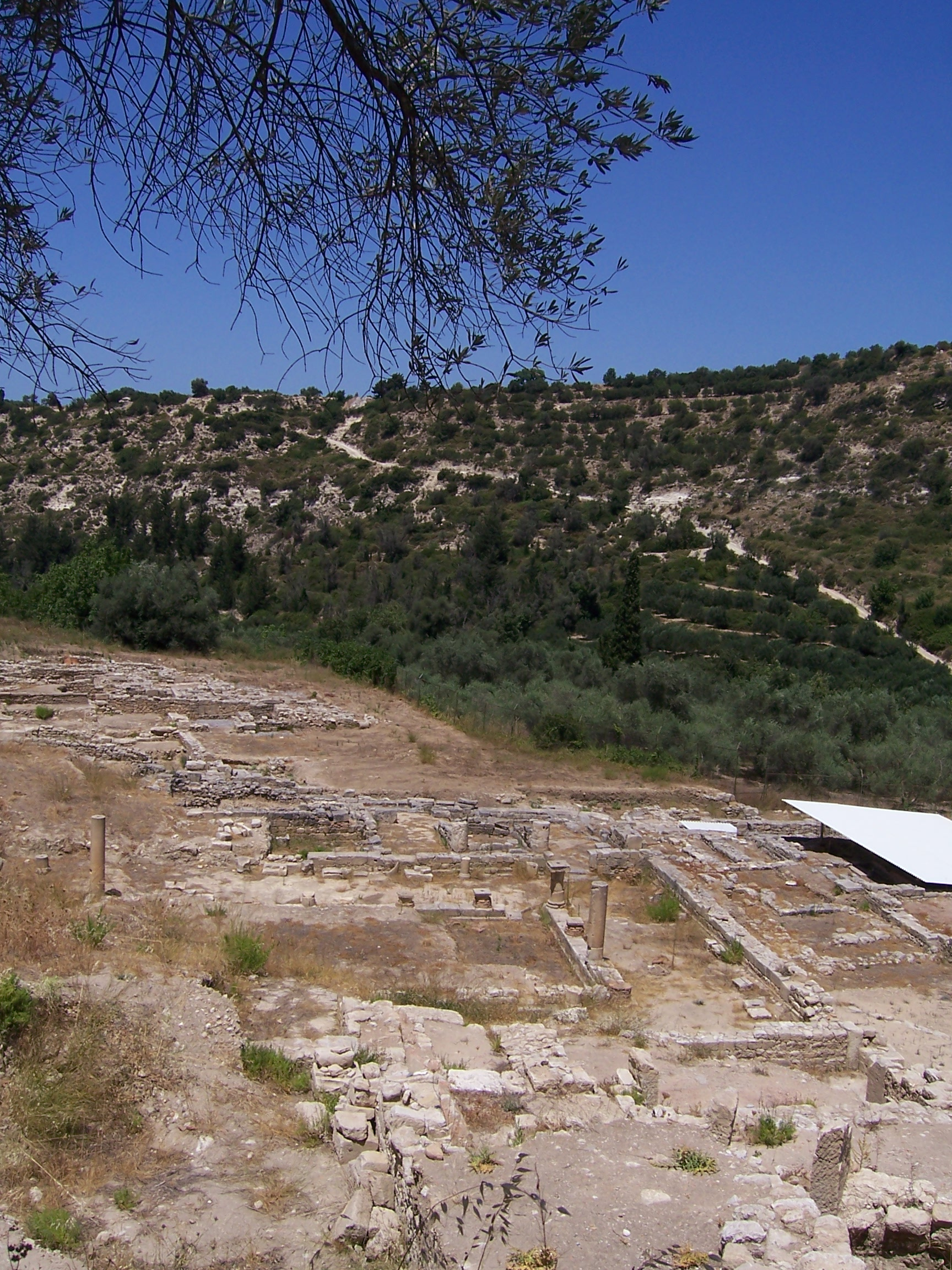
Archeological site of Eleutherna

Eleutherna is under excavation since 1984 as part of the systematic Eleutherna project led by Department of History and Archaeology from the University of Crete led originally by three Classical Archaeology professors: Petros Themelis, Thanasis Kalpaxis and Nikos Stampolidis.

Stampolidis has been in charge of surveys and systematic excavations at the sanctuaries and necropoleis in Orthi Petra, even stone quarries in the surroundings of the Prines hill. The discovery of the remains of four females in Orthi Petra was declared one of top 10 discoveries of 2009 by the Archaeological Institute of America.Anagnostis Agelarakis was instrumental in helping to identify an Iron Age matriline—a so-called “dynasty of priestesses” — at the site, based on the dental epigenetic traits of the individuals buried there. The Museum of Ancient Eleutherna, directly linked to the archaeological site, was inaugurated in June 2016.

During the ninth century BC, in sub-Mycenaean times, in the Geometric Period of the later Greek Dark Ages, Dorians colonized the city on a steep, naturally fortified ridge. The city's location made it a natural crossroads, as it lay between Kydonia on the northwest coast and Knossos, and between the shore, where it controlled its ports, Stavromenos and Panormos, and the great sanctuary cave near the peak of Ida, Idaion Andron. The Dorian city evolved in the Archaic Period in a similar vein as did Lato and Dreros, its contemporaneous Dorian counterparts.

In 220 BC the city of Eleutherna triggered the outbreak of the Lyttian War by accusing the Rhodians of the assassination of their leader Timarchus. The Eleuthernans eventually declared war on Rhodes. During the following conflict Eleutherna was at first allied with Knossos and Gortys, but later they were compelled to change sides by the Polyrrhenians and joined the opposite coalition led by the Macedonian king Philip V.

With the Roman conquest of Crete in 68/67 BCE, luxurious villas, baths, and other public buildings demonstrate that Eleutherna was a prosperous centre through the Imperial period, until the catastrophic earthquake of 365 CE. Eleutherna was the seat of a Christian bishop: bishop Euphratas constructed a large basilica in the mid-seventh century. The attacks of caliph Harun Al-Rashid in the later eighth century, together with another earthquake in 796, and the subsequent Arab rule in Crete, led to the final abandonment of the site. Following the occupation of the island by the Republic of Venice, a Catholic diocese was established, still a Roman Catholic titular bishopric today.

Public exhibitions in 1993 and 1994, and especially the comprehensive exhibition of 2004 at the Museum of Cycladic Art, Athens, have introduced the archaeological site to the general public. On the last occasion the Louvre lent the seventh-century BCE "Lady of Auxerre", now given a definitive Cretan context with comparable finds at Eleutherna.

== Archaeology ==
Excavations began at the site in 1985. However Dilys Powell autobiography The Villa Ariadne (published 1975) refers to her husband Humfry Payne undertaking digs there "once again in 1929". Humfry Payne was appointed Director of the British School at Athens in the same year.

=== Pyrgiaa ===
The city is situated in a strategic geographical position: it is safeguarded by mountains to the south but retains access to the sea in the north and it controls important roads located north and east of the city. The acropolis can be accessed via a narrow route overlooked by a tower, the Greek word for which ("πύργος,"pýrgos") lends its name to the nearby hill: Pyrgi. This hill is itself flanked by two torrent-beds, of which the western side is called Haplota and the eastern is called Farangitis. Excavations of the natural terrace on the hill, the central plateau, revealed hundreds of small obsidian pieces—comprising materials such as flakes, cores, and blades—dating to the Early Minoan period alongside pottery from the Early Minoan to the Late Minoan IIIc period. The Early Minoan pottery samples included wares imported from Vasiliki, Pyrgos, and Agios Onoufrios.

It is likely that, during the 7th-century BCE, the early inhabitants of the site organized themselves around the plateau, which served as the center of the community's religious and political life. Such origins are attested for in numerous inscriptions uncovered at the site, many of which were found within the ruins of an early Byzantine Church dated to the 3rd-4th centuries founded upon an older tetraconch. Moreover, the presence of a temple located just south of the church that was constructed in the 7th century BCE and continuously operated until the 2nd century CE further indicates that the central plateau bore great religious and civic significance for the community. Archaeological work in the area revealed sections of a wall on the western slope of the hill that were built upon foundations that themselves were set within a trench dug into rock. This structure contained no conclusively datable elements, resembled the masonry of fortifications at Aptera and Falasarna, which have been dated to the Hellenistic period. Large quantities of Hellenistic pottery were discovered at the tetraconch, indicating high levels of human activity during the period between the 3rd-2nd centuries BCE. Amidst these Hellenistic wares, a set of high-quality drinking and serving vessels was excavated southwest of the tetraconch, suggesting that these materials may have been intentionally abandoned.

Cassius Dio mentions that the city was conquered by the Romans through deception; he notes that residents of the city had sabotaged a brick tower that had proved difficult to capture by discreetly coating it with vinegar at night, causing the tower to become brittle. Dio notes that the Roman general Metellus, following his conquest of the city, had extorted large sums of money from the inhabitants. Archaeological excavation revealed the presence of large deposits of earth, which could extend several meters deep, that covered layers of destroyed Hellenistic structures, indicating that there may have been widespread leveling of Hellenistic buildings prior to extensive reconstruction programs initiated under Roman rule. The presence of Roman pottery imports alongside an inscription dated to 4-6 CE dedicated to Agrippa Postumus indicate that human activity continued in the area during the 1st-century CE. Roman construction efforts including the establishment of a bathhouse and an aqueduct; such expensive projects suggest the central plateau retained enough significance for the local community to warrant such investment. Further excavation revealed fragments of clay spacers, marble veneer, hydraulic mortar, clay floor tiles, and four bronze coins dated to 296-310 CE all embedded within a layer of black soil found in the area. Such finds suggest that the bathhouse and the tetraconch were possibly abandoned prior to the earthquake of 365, which is documented to have impacted other areas of the Pyrgi hill. Archaeological evidence of human habitation in the central plateau remains scant from the 4th-7th centuries, until—in the 7th-century—a large church was constructed near the old acropolis and was built upon the prior tetraconch. Furthermore, a cemetery was established on the ruins of the former temple and the fortifications of the acropolis were renovated, presumably to help protect against the Arab incursions. Other evidence suggests that the lower terraces of Pyrgi hill continued to thrive during the 5th and 6th centuries, with four new churches constructed in the area during this time. All evidence of residential buildings disappears after the 8th-century, and the latest numismatic evidence of human habitation at the central plateau is a follis of Leo III and Constantine V (735-741).

==== Temple ====
The temple was constructed on the natural bedrock of the plateau utilizing the natural limestone found near the site. Its original state is somewhat obscured due to the impact of later constructions, on the remains of the initial site, leaving some parts of the temple preserved only in a fragmentary condition. The south wall of the temple was 9.87 meters long and 0.65 meters wide; it was coated by alternating patterns of ashlar blocks and fieldstones alongside its length, while its width is covered exclusively by ashlar used as stretchers. Rough or semi-worked stones were placed as fillers between the vertical joints and the ashlar blocks throughout the wall. It is likely that the wall extended further beyond the surviving remnants: the outcrop of natural rock on the western end of the wall was likely completely covered by now-lost westward extensions of the structure.

On easternmost end of the southern wall, heavily eroded blocks connect with the southernmost end of the eastern wall, forming a distinct southeastern section of the walling of the temple. The ashlar blocks of the southern were cut and reshaped to fit to the east wall, indicating that the eastern wall was a later addition constructed after the south wall. The preserved segments of the eastern wall stretch across a length of 5.9 meters and a height of 0.77 meters, although only two courses of four ashlar blocks survive. Another, separate segment of blocks reaching a height of 0.12 meters extends from the lowest course; it was possibly an euthynteria, a type of structure placed near the foundation of buildings in Ancient Greek architecture. One incision obliquely carved into the width of the westernmost block of the uppermost course of the southern wall matches to the western end of a paved area north of the wall, indicating that a segment of wall once connected the two. Evidence of this largely lost section of the walls may appear in the form of various ashlar blocks arranged in a north-south direction and oriented at a right angle towards the southern wall. Further ruins on the western side of the temple attest to the presence of another, distinct western wall; although, unusual aspects of its masonry—such as the usage of sherds as fillers—indicate that this structure was constructed after the other portions of the wall.

Remains a 4.38-meter-long and 0.98-meter-high portion of the north wall were also recovered, although they were partially covered by ruins of the later church. Certain features of this wall are congruent with the design elements of the aforementioned sections; particularly, the width of this section of the north wall is covered by a stone block and it is located near semi-finished stones akin to those found alongside the south wall. These similarities suggest that it was likely constructed at the same time, although other features of the wall suggest a different style of construction from the south wall. Such discrepancies may have emerged due to the influence of subsequent construction on the site. The easternmost block of the northern wall bears an incision that may have matched with the base of another wall that itself ran perpendicular to the north wall along a north-south wall.

==== Pits ====
Excavations on the western side of the acropolis revealed three pits containing ritual materials, of which two were dated to the Late Minoan IIIc period and one was dated the Proto-Geometric period. Pit A, dated to the LMIIIc period, was cut 0.8-0.9 meters deep into bedrock and has a diameter of approximately 1.02 meters. It contained small pieces of clay, drinking vessels, cooking utensils, and animal bones—primarily sheep and goats. Alongside these discoveries, numerous ceramic objects were found: a brazier with signs of burning, three skyphoi, and a tripod cooking-pot with a flat bottom and straight walls that may have been involved in communal meals. Two figurines were uncovered in a layer of grey-brown soil: one was a depiction of a seated female being, likely a kourotrophos, and another was a handmade sculpture of a bull with its nostrils, eyes, and mouth marked by red paint and red stripes covering its head and body, possibly representing a harness. Pit B, measuring 1.63 by 1.34 meters, was carved into natural rock and contained pottery from the Subminoan to the Proto-Geometric periods, much of which comprised cooking tools and drinking vessels. Further pottery dating from the Proto-Geometric to the Geometric period was unearthed in the upper-layers of the deposit; the materials were highly fragmented, likely due to damage inflicted by later construction activities. Despite the aforementioned archaeological finds, it is unlikely the site was continuously populated throughout each period, as there are scant remains of any settlement during any period. Pit C was dated to the Proto-Geometric period and was a 0.5 by 0.43-meter hole carved into the natural soil of the area. It was divided into two sections separated by dressed stones, although materials were likely deposited into the holes at the same time, as disparate pieces of one oenochoe were found in both sections. The pit contained stone tools, animal bones, and pieces of ceramic items, primarily kitchen tools and drinking vessels.

Collectively, the pits represent a continuity between numerous ancient sites throughout Crete, which contain pits carved into natural rock and used for the storage of utensils for drinking and eating. It is possible that such deposits were connected to the practice of ritualized communal eating, possibly for the social function of strengthening intrapersonal bonds. The presence of a kourotrophos figurine alongside wild-goat horns, indicating the involvement of meat acquired through hunting, indicates that the practice involved with the pits may have constituted a coming-of-age ritual representing integration into the broader community. It is likely that the ritual practices occurred in an open-air environment as no evidence of any contemporary architectural activity has been unearthed on the central plateau except for the archaic temple.

== See also ==
- Museum of Ancient Eleutherna
- Eleutherna Bridge
- List of ancient Greek cities

== Bibliography ==
- Nicholas Chr. Stampolidis, Eleutherna on Crete: The Wider Horizon. In Aruz, J. and Seymour, M. (eds). Assyria to Iberia: Art and Culture in the Iron Age, Metropolitan Museum of Art symposia, pp. 283–295, Yale University Press, 2016. ISBN 9781588396068
- Anagnostis Agelarakis, The anthropology of Tomb A1K1 of Orthi Petra in Eleutherna. A Narrative of the Bones: Aspects of the Human Condition in Geometric-Archaic Eleutherna (Athens, 2005).
- Kotsonas, Antonis (2008). "The Discovery of Eleutherna: from the Formation of the Modern Cretan State to Humfry Payne's Excavations (1899–1929)". Annual of the British School at Athens. 103: 275–298. doi:10.1017/S0068245400000095. hdl:20.500.11820/7fd15a65-ea16-47bc-9717-02fb5274216c. ISSN 2045-2403.
- S. Andreas Koudellou, Eleutherna 2006-2009, The University of Crete, January 10, 2009.
- Tsigonaki, Christina; Spanou, Nikolia; Bitis, Ioannis; Kalpaxis, Athanasios (2021-01-01). "Of Gods and Men: Continuities and Disruptions in the Sacred Topography of the Acropolis at Eleutherna". Annuario Della Scuola Archeologica Di Atene E Delle Misioni Italiane in Oriente.
