= Prinias =

Prinias Πρινιάς
- Community
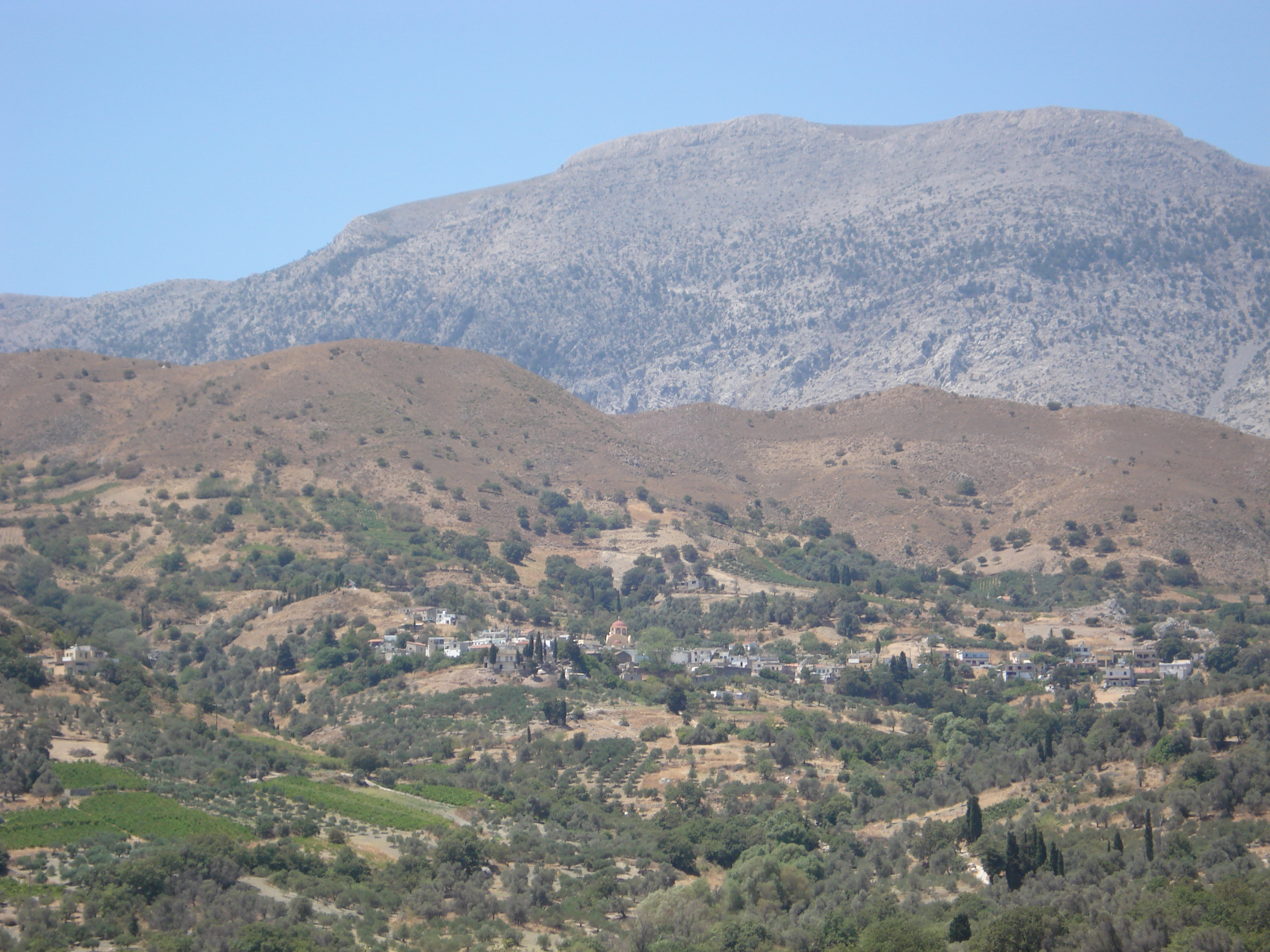
- Prinias village

- Location within Greece
- Coordinates: 35°10′11″N 25°0′21″E
- Country: Greece
- Administrative region: Crete
- Regional unit: Heraklion
- Municipality: Heraklion
- Municipal unit: Agia Varvara
- Elevation: 610 m (2,000 ft)

Population (2021)
  - Community: 194
- Time zone: UTC+2 (EET)
  - Summer (DST): UTC+3 (EEST)
- Postal code: 70003
- Area code: 28940
- Website: http://www.rizinia.com

Prinias (ancient Rizinia) is an archaeological site in Crete that has revealed a seventh-century BCE temple with striking similarities to ancient Egyptian architecture, including an Egyptianised seated goddess. It is 35 kilometres (22 mi) southwest of Iraklion, about halfway between Gortyn and Knossos. Above the site is a peak sanctuary, a sub-Minoan survival.

Prinias developed at a similar time frame with Lato and Polyrrhenia as an Archaic Period settlement, colonised by Greeks from the mainland. The site contains vestiges of "the first stone buildings since the fall of the Mycenaean kingdoms". Temple A, dated to around 625 BCE, is the earliest known Greek temple decorated with sculpture. Although its plan follows the Mycenaean model, the building had a flat roof and three massive piers on the façade. The most remarkable surviving detail is a limestone lintel bearing two monumental statues of goddesses, seated facing each other. The figures, whose identification is disputed, each wear a long skirt and a cape, reminiscent of the so-called "Lady of Auxerre". Below the figures is an orientalising frieze representing three panthers on each side; the motif is typical for North Syria.

Temple B is known for its Daedalic sculpture, which "consists of a statue of a goddess seated on a throne and wearing a polos and a stiff garment decorated with animals, a horse, a lion, and a sphinx". The goddess could have represented either Rhea or Artemis as "the mistress of animals". Most of the finds from Prinias (including a singular frieze of horsemen) are conserved at the Archaeological Museum at Heraklion.

Further evidence of Orientalizing culture was extracted from the necropolis which spreads to the west from the ancient town. Some 680 burials (including ritual burials of dogs and horses) were made in the area between the 13th century and 600 BCE. The ritual has Oriental features, with bodies cremated, and heads buried separately.

== See also ==
- List of ancient Greek cities
