= Xenophantus =

Xenophantus (Ancient Greek: Ξενόφαντος) may refer to:

- Xenophantus of Athens, a vase maker.
- Xenophantus of Thasos, a statuary.
- Xenophantus, a flute-player. He was a musician at the court of Alexander the Great.
- Xenophantus, a Rhodian admiral during the Lyttian War.
