= Museum of Ancient Eleutherna =

Coordinates: 35°19′26.8″N 24°40′13.8″E

- Μουσείο Αρχαίας Ελεύθερνας
- Established: 2016
- Location: Eleutherna, Rethymno, Greece
- Type: Archaeological museum
- Website: http://mae.uoc.gr/

The Museum of Ancient Eleutherna (Greek: Μουσείο Αρχαίας Ελεύθερνας) is an on-site museum of Greece in the archaeological park of Eleutherna, Rethymno, and houses artifacts found in the nearby archaeological site of Eleutherna and the necropolis of Orthi Petra. as seen in the virtual tour of museum and the archaeological sites.

== History of the museum ==
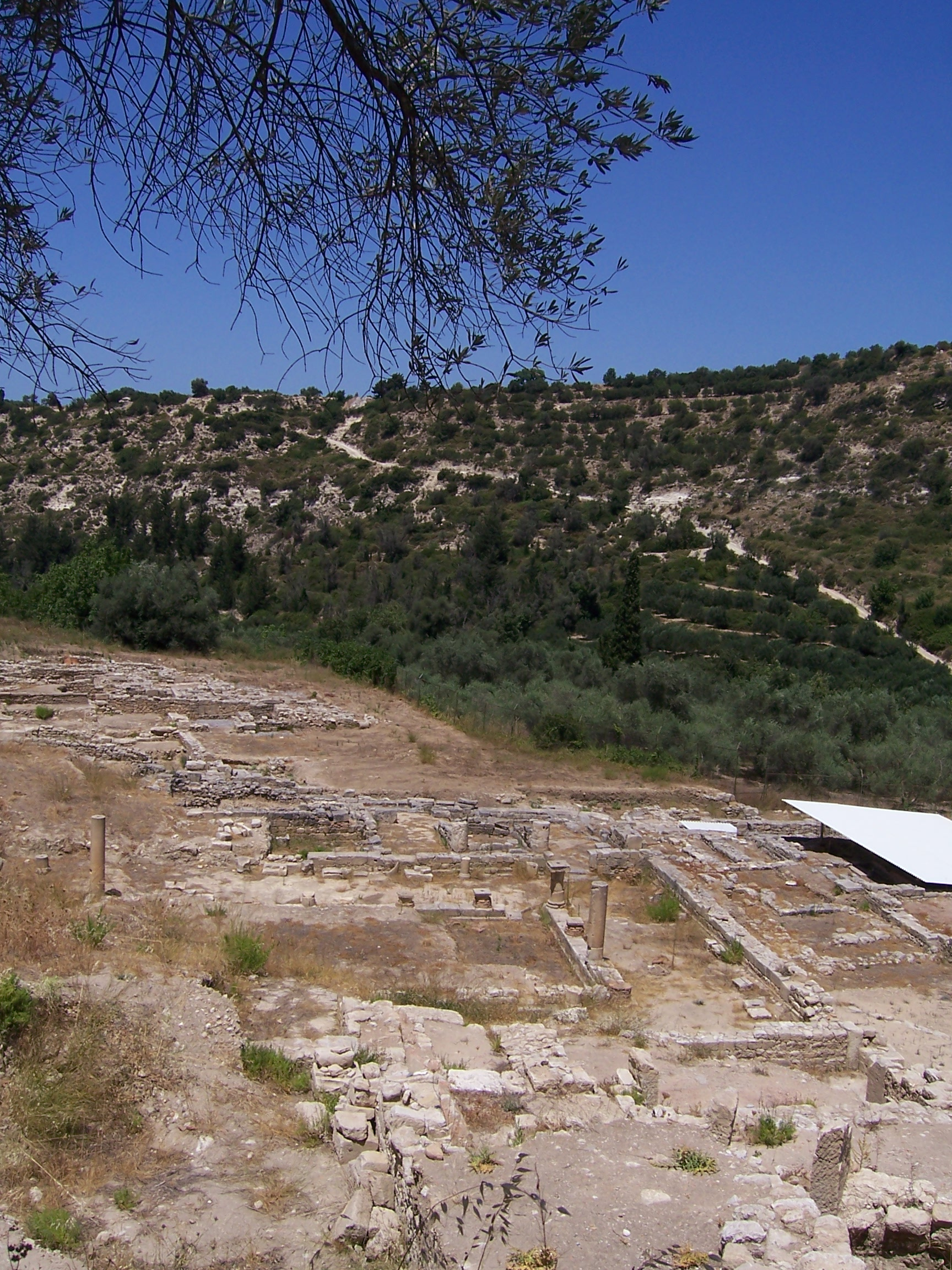
The archaeological site of Eleutherna

The Museum of Ancient Eleutherna displays exhibits from the site of Eleutherna (Ancient Greek: Ἐλεύθερνα), a city-state in Crete, Greece which flourished from the Greek Dark Ages until Byzantine times. The site lies 25 km southeast of Rethymno, on a narrow northern spur of Mount Ida, the highest mountain in Crete.

The Museum of Ancient Eleutherna was inaugurated on 19 June 2016 and is the fourth museum in Greece exclusively focusing on a single archaeological site, after the museums of Olympia, Delphi and Vergina. The exhibits span a period of three and a half millennia (3000 BC to 1300 AD) and include objects of art and everyday life from Prehistoric, Geometric, Archaic, Classical, Hellenistic, Roman and Byzantine eras. The excavations at the site of Eleutherna began in the mid 1980s under the supervision of the University of Crete and continue to the present day directed by Prof. Nikolaos Stampolidis.

== Collections ==
=== Room A ===
Room A displays artefacts imported from regions outside Crete such as Attica, Peloponnese, Cyclades, east Aegean islands, Asia Minor, Cyprus, Phoenicia and Egypt, which showcase aspects of the public, political, religious, social and private life in Eleutherna. Some digital installations are also present.

=== Room B ===
Room B is devoted to the religious and worship life in Eleutherna from the early Iron Age till the Byzantine era. It also includes the archaic sculpture of the Lady of Eleutherna, which relates to the Lady of Auxerre displayed at the Louvre Museum in Paris.

=== Room C ===
Room C focuses on the finds from the necropolis of Orthi Petra and illustrates burial customs from Homeric Greece, such as the funeral pyre of Patroclus as described in the Iliad. The excavations have unearthed treasures such as fine jewelry, weapons, grave objects from glass, faience and ivory, bronze and ceramic vessels, and figurines. A prominent exhibit is a bronze shield.

== Notable exhibits ==
- Lady of Eleutherna
- Bronze shields
- Funerary pyre remains

== See also ==
- List of museums in Greece
- Lady of Auxerre
