= Eteia =

Eteia or Etea (Ancient Greek: Ἤτεια) was a town of ancient Crete. Pliny the Elder places it between Phalasarna and Cisamus (although some manuscripts have the town name as Elea or Eleae (Ἤλεα or Ἤλεαι). Euthyphro claims that Myson of Chenae was a native of the town.

The site of Eteia is unlocated.
