= Eleutherna Bridge =

Ancient bridge near Eleutherna, Greece

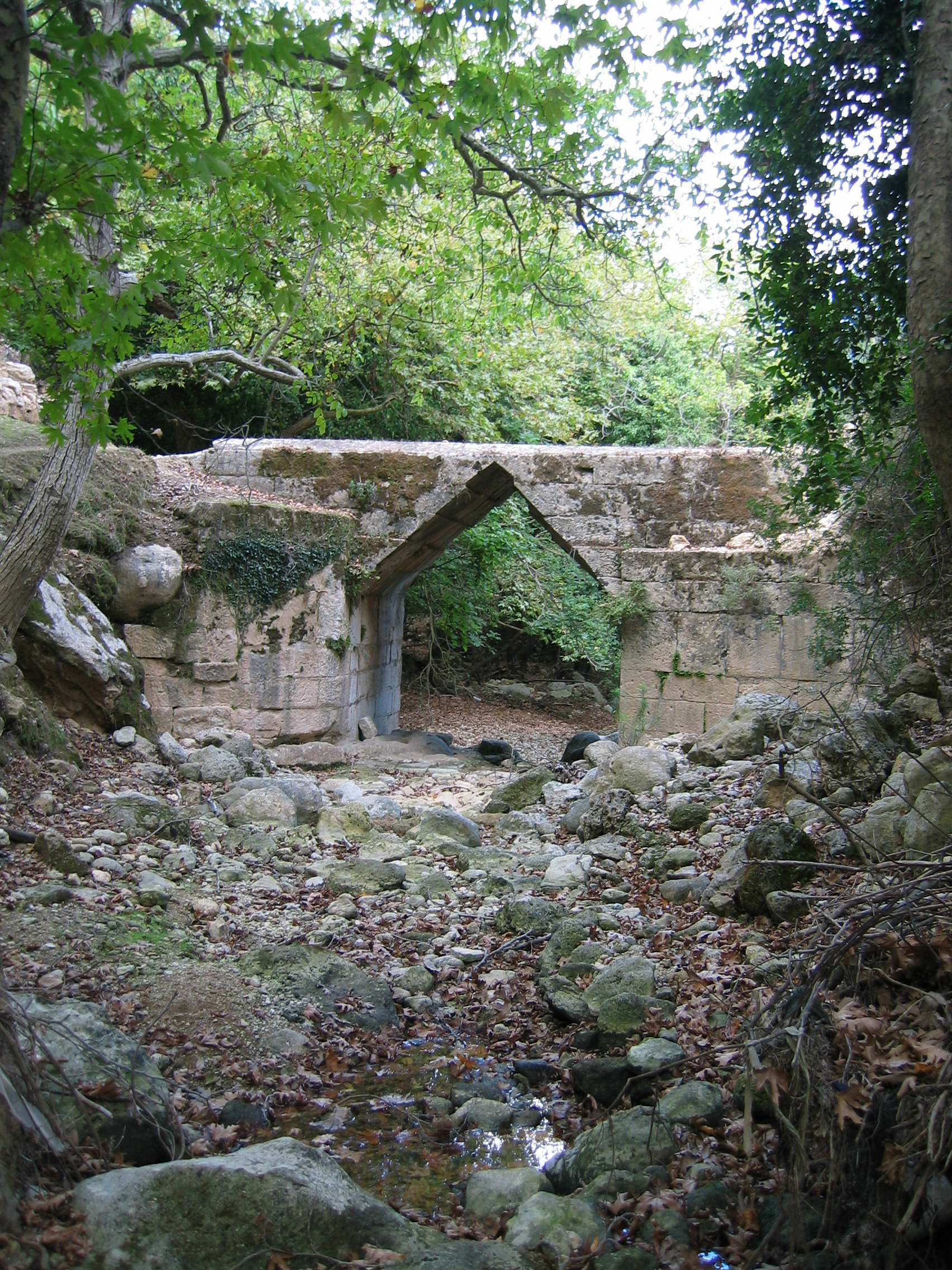
- View to the south
- Coordinates: 35°20′17″N 24°40′15″E
- Carries: Footpath to Eleutherna
- Crosses: Confluence of Pharangitis and Chalopota streams
- Locale: Prines, Crete, Greece

Characteristics
- Design: Corbel arch bridge
- Material: Limestone
- Total length: 9.35 m
- Width: 5.05−5.2 m
- Height: 4−4.2 m
- Longest span: 3.95 m
- No. of spans: 1

History
- Construction end: Hellenistic period

The Eleutherna Bridge is an ancient Greek corbel arch bridge near the Cretan town of Eleutherna, Greece. A similar second bridge standing a short distance south of it collapsed toward the end of the 19th century, with only very few traces remaining.

== Description ==
The well-preserved structure has a single span of 3.95 m, which is quite large for a false arch. The opening is cut from the unmortared limestone blocks in the shape of an isosceles triangle, the height of which is 1.84 m. The overall length of the bridge measures 9.35 m. Its width varies from 5.1 to 5.2 m, with the structure converging slightly towards its center point above the arch (5.05 m width there). The height is between 4 and 4.2 m.

== History ==
The bridge, which is still in use, was first described by the Englishman T.A.B. Spratt in his Travels and Researches in Crete, after he had paid a visit to the site in 1853. At the time, another ancient bridge with a triangular arch was still standing a few hundred metres away, but, judging from a later report, was destroyed some unknown time before 1893.

== Date ==
While there is general agreement that the two bridges of Eleutherna date to the pre-Roman period, a more precise dating is hampered by the lack of proper finds. According to Nakassis, the extant, northern bridge was built sometime during the Hellenistic period, while the Italian scholar Galliazzo dates the construction more precisely to the end of the 4th or beginning of the 3rd century BC. For the smaller, now collapsed southern bridge Nakassis cautiously supports a late Classical date.

== See also ==
- List of Roman bridges

== Sources ==
- Briegleb, Jochen (1971), "Die vorrömischen Steinbrücken des Altertums", Technikgeschichte, 38 (3): 255–260 (258)
- Galliazzo, Vittorio (1995), I ponti romani, vol. 1, Treviso: Edizioni Canova, pp. 37f, ISBN 88-85066-66-6
- Nakassis, Athanassios (2000), "The Bridges of Ancient Eleutherna", The Annual of the British School at Athens, 95: 353–365, doi:10.1017/s006824540000472x, S2CID 112648240
