= Anagnostis Agelarakis =

Anthropology professor

Anagnostis P. Agelarakis (Greek: Αναγνώστης Π. Αγελαράκης; born 1 January 1956) is a professor of Anthropological Archaeology and Physical Anthropology at Adelphi University.

He received a B.A. from Lund University in 1977, in Classical Archaeology and European Ethnology, and conducted his post-baccalaureate studies at Lund Polytechnic Institute in 1980, in Environmental Studies. In 1988, he earned an M.Phil. in Anthropology, and in 1989, a Ph.D., in Archaeology and Physical Anthropology from Columbia University.

Dr. Agelarakis has worked at archaeological sites throughout the world, and in 2013 is engaged in field research at Eleutherna in Greece (Crete). He was instrumental in helping to identify an Iron Age matriline—a so-called “dynasty of priestesses” — at the site, based on the dental epigenetic traits of the individuals buried there.
