= Thomas Abel Brimage Spratt =

British admiral, hydrographer and geologist (1811–1888)

Vice-Admiral Thomas Abel Brimage Spratt CB FRS
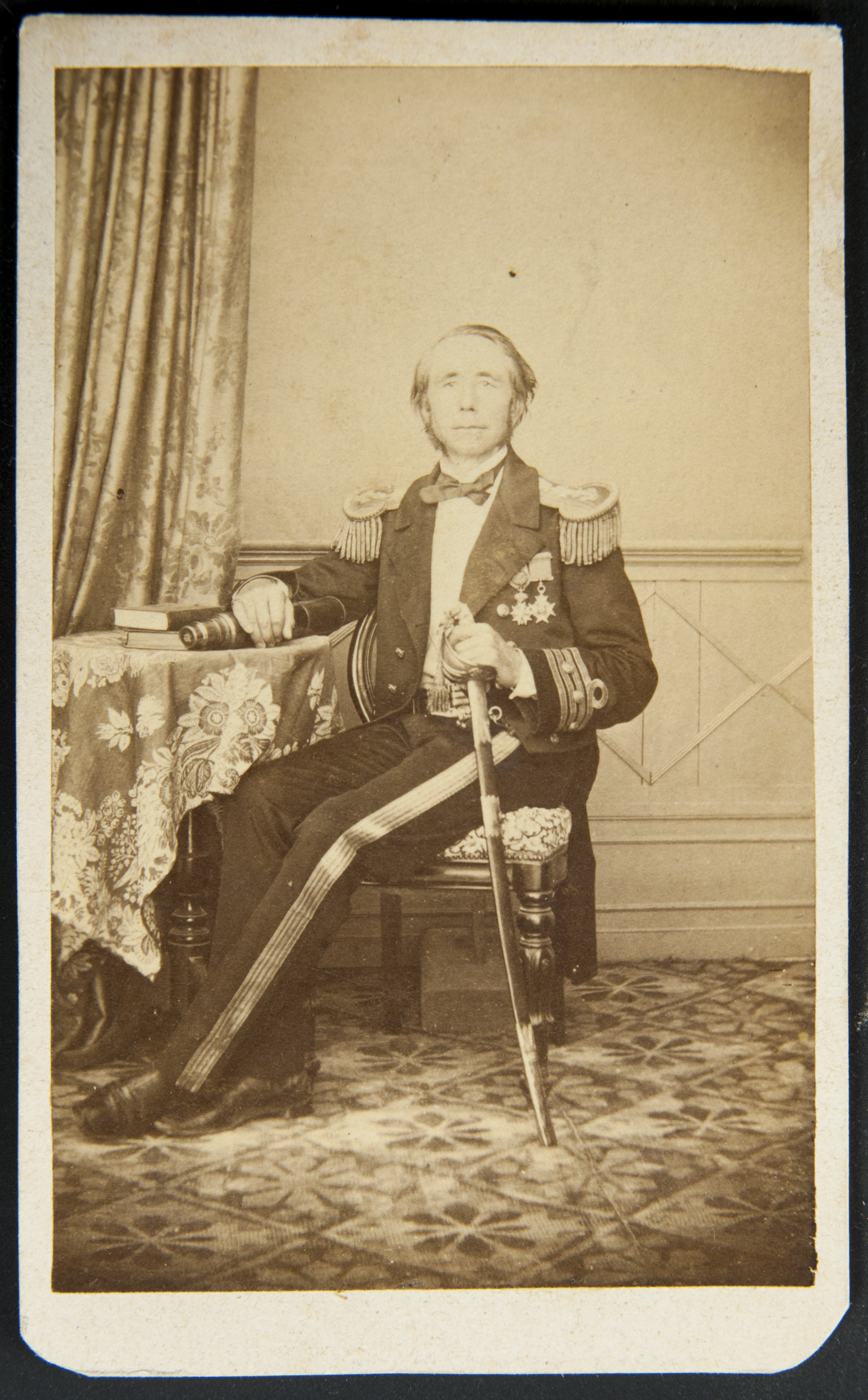
- "Captain Thos. A. B. Spratt RN" (annotation); Carte de visite by Schembri & Zahra, Malta, ca 1860s.
- Born: 11 May 1811; Woodway Cottage, East Teignmouth
- Died: 12 March 1888 (aged 76); Tunbridge Wells
- Occupations: Royal Navy Vice-Admiral, hydrographer, and geologist
- Spouse: Sophia Price
- Children: a son
- Parent: James Spratt

Thomas Abel Brimage Spratt (11 May 1811 – 12 March 1888) was an English vice-admiral, hydrographer, and geologist.

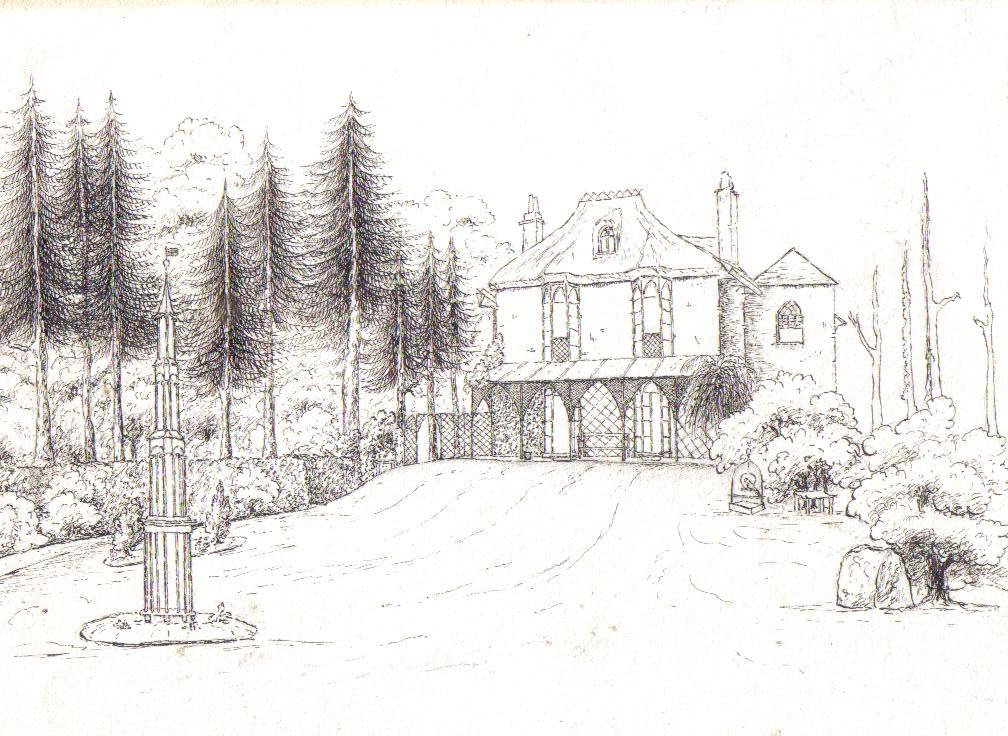
Woodway Cottage in 1825, birthplace of Thomas Spratt.

== Life ==
Chart of Balaklava Bay surveyed by Spratt in Spitfire, 1854.

Thomas Spratt was born at Woodway House, East Teignmouth, the eldest son of Commander James Spratt, RN, who was a hero of the Battle of Trafalgar. He joined the Royal Navy at age 16 in 1827 and was attached to the surveying branch on HMS Victory. He was engaged almost continuously until 1863 in surveying the Mediterranean. He received his early training in surveying from Thomas Graves in HMS Mastiff and HMS Beacon. He was promoted to Lieutenant in 1841 and his first command was the converted sixth-rate HMS Volage. He then succeeded Graves as commander of HMS Spitfire. He rendered distinguished service in the Black Sea during the Crimean War, planning the attacks on Kertch and Kinburn. He was promoted to captain in 1855, and was appointed Companion of the Order of the Bath in the same year. He was then given command of HMS Medina in which ship he continued survey work in the Mediterranean.

At an earlier date he was associated with Edward Forbes, then naturalist to the "Beacon", and during the years 1841–1843 they made observations on the bathymetric distribution of marine life. He was specially indebted to Forbes for his interest in natural history and geology, and together they published Travels in Lycia, etc. (1847). He was elected a Fellow of the Royal Society as The author of Travels in Lycia, & Important papers in the Journals of the Geological & Geographical Societies.

Whilst on sick leave in Teignmouth due to the after effects of malaria he investigated the movements of the Sand Bars at Teignmouth and suggested practical means of improving the entrance to the harbour. He published his research in 1856 and was congratulated for the clarity and practicality of his work by Isambard Kingdom Brunel, who was building the South Devon Railway at the time.

Spratt investigated the caves at Malta and obtained remains of the pygmy elephant (Elephas melitensis), which was described by Hugh Falconer. He investigated the geology of several Greek islands, the shores of Asia Minor, and the Nile Delta.

He was especially distinguished for his Travels and Researches in Crete (2 vols., 1865), in which he described the physical geography, geology, archaeology (Eleutherna Bridge) and natural history of the island. Two fossil species were named in his honour and several books were dedicated to him. He was commissioner of fisheries from 1866 to 1873; and acting conservator of the River Mersey from 1879 until his death at Tunbridge Wells on 12 March 1888.

He had married Sophia Price. Two sons died young. Sidney Drake died in Malta (23 December 1852) at the age of 21 months and was buried at the Msida Bastion Historic Garden, in Floriana. A gravestone is still existing. On the same stone is also mentioned William Devereux who died in the island of Crete (12 November 1852) at the age of 3 years and 6 months.

== Role in discovery of Troy ==
One of the maps made by Thomas Spratt known as "Spratt's Map" was used by archaeologists Heinrich Schliemann, Wilhelm Dorpfeld, and Carl Blegen, which contributed to the discovery of Troy, because the name Troy with a question mark was added by a German professor of classical antiquities working with Spratt over the spot of the real Troy. He had added it, because it was above the ruins of the identified Greek city of Novo Ilium (New Troy). Observing the map, Schliemann saw Troy with a question mark and decided to begin digging, which led to the discovery of Troy.

== See also ==
- O'Byrne, William Richard (1849). "Spratt, Thomas Abel Brimage" . A Naval Biographical Dictionary . John Murray – via Wikisource.
- Xerxes Canal
