= Petros Themelis =

Greek archaeologist (1936–2023)

Petros G. Themelis (Greek: Πέτρος Θέμελης, 1936 – 27 October 2023) was a Greek classical archaeologist and professor of the University of Crete. He led excavations at numerous sites, including extensive excavations and restoration works at ancient Messene.

== Life ==
Petros Themelis was born in Thessaloniki, the son of philologist and surrealist poet Georgos Themelis, and brother of Dimitrios Themelis, who was a violist and director of the State Conservatory of Thessaloniki. He completed his primary and secondary education at the Experimental School of Thessaloniki.

Themelis studied classical archaeology and classical philology at the Aristotle University of Thessaloniki from 1955 to 1959. He carried out his military service between 1960 and 1962 and then became an academic assistant at the Archaeological Museum of Thessaloniki. During this period, he participated in excavations at Thessaloniki, Pella, Lefkandi on Euboea, Stratoni in the Chalcidice, and the palace at Vergina. In 1962, as a supervisor of the excavations in the funerary site of Derveni, some twelve kilometers northwest of Thessaloniki, he saved the almost charred Derveni Papyrus from being mistaken for a burnt log and lost forever. From 1963 until 1969, he was an epimeletes for the archaeological service at Olympia, Attica, and Euboea. In 1972, Themelis received a doctorate from LMU Munich for his thesis on Frühgriechische Grabbauten (Early Greek funerary structures). The next year he was appointed ephor of antiquities for the regions of Phocis, West Locris, and Aetolia/Acarnania. From 1977 until 1980, he was director of the Delphi Archaeological Museum. In 1980, he was transferred to the newly created post of director of paleoanthropology and cave research.

In 1984, Themelis became professor of classical archaeology at the University of Crete, based at Rethymno. As professor, he led the university's excavations of sector I at Eleutherna in Crete. From 1987 onwards, he undertook extensive excavations and restoration works at ancient Messene. In this role, he published several books and articles, including studies of the works of the sculptor Damophon of Messene that were found in the excavations. He was chairman of the "Society for Messenian Studies" and a corresponding member of the German and Austrian Archaeological Institutes. On 18 January 2005, Themelis was appointed commander of the Greek Order of the Phoenix by president Konstantinos Stephanopoulos.

Petros Themelis died at a hospital in Kalamata on 27 October 2023, at the age of 87. He was buried at the archaeological site of Messene on 2 November 2023.

== Selected publications ==
- Frühgriechische Grabbauten (Early Greek funerary structures). Zabern, Mainz 1976 (Munich doctoral dissertation 1972)
- Mykene. Die Monumente und die Funde (Mycenae: The Monuments and the Finds). Athens 1985
- Η αρχαία Μεσσήνη (Ancient Messene). Athens 1999
- Ήρωες και ηρώα στη Μεσσήνη (Heroes and Hero shrines in Messene). Athens 2000
- Πρωτοβυζαντινή Ελεύθερνα Τομέας Ι (Proto-Byzantine Eleutherna, Sector I). Athens 2004.
- with M. Kiderlen, Das Poseidonheiligtum bei Akovitika in Messenien. Struktur und Entwicklungszusammenhang eines regionalen Zentrums (The Sanctuary of Poseidon at Akovitika in Messenia). Wiesbaden 2010.
