= Woodway House =

Historic house in Devon, England

Coordinates: 50°33′15.2″N 3°29′33.9″W

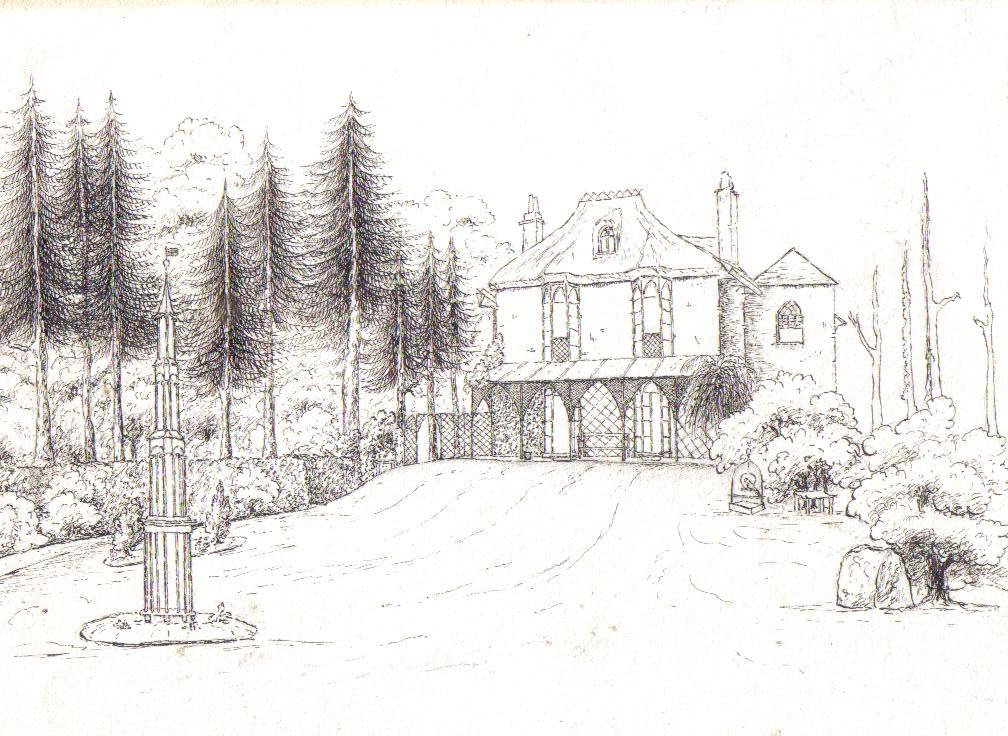
Woodway Cottage in about 1825 when Captain Spratt was in residence.

Woodway House is in Teignmouth, South Devon, England. It was at one time a farm on lands held by the Bishops of Exeter. In around 1815 a thatched "cottage" in the "cottage ornée" style of Horace Walpole's (1717–1797) Thames-side villa, Strawberry Hill, was built here by Captain James Spratt of the Royal Navy.

Walpole built his villa at Twickenham in around 1747 and set a fashion for rural romantic Gothic-style retreats. A number were built by retired colonial administrators and military men who liked verandahs, spacious lawns and the sunny climes of Devon.

Woodway House is a Grade II listed building, a classic example of the romantic Devonian "chocolate box" cottage orné style of architecture.

== History ==
A view of the driveway with its granite gateposts and the cast-iron gates which somehow survived World War II.

Woodway had formerly been a farm, originally constructed in the form of a Devon longhouse until Captain James Spratt built the large cob and thatch cottage on the front in around 1815. A mansion house on the lower boundary of the Woodway grounds was known as Gorway. Demolished in the 1970s, it was named after the Norman baron, Serlo de la Gore. Woodway would have been part of its feudal holdings and could have been the home farm. Gorway's large stables, gate house and coach house survived and were for many years used by a company that maintained garden machinery. The owners of "Woodway" Farm, at this time probably known as Leafield (1890 OS map), prior to the Spratts were the Brimage family who appear to have moved to Holcombe in Dawlish, apart from Spratt's sister-in-law, Leah, listed in the 1851 census as the "house proprietor" of Woodway Cottage in Woodaway Lane. The Whalleys lived at Woodway from around 1886 and appear to have been friends of the Spratts for some time previous to their purchase. Lt.Col.P.R.Whalley, D.S.O. sold Wodewaye in 1951 and the Griffith family became owners until around 1992.

The name Wodewaye may have been used by the Whalleys from the romantic notion that Woodaway derived from "Woden's Way", rather than a colloquial use of the word wood, however another possibility suggested by the 1890 and 1860 OS maps is that there was another house called "Woodway" further up Woodway Road, next to "Luchana" and the "Grove". Later its name was changed due to the endless confusion between Woodway House and Woodway or Wodeway Cottage. The Griffith family were therefore able to use the name Woodway House from the early 1950s. One of the walks described in an early guide (1830s) to the area mentions "Woodaway Cottage, the residence of Lieut. Spratt, R.N."

A number of features of the old farm remained, including a lane that had joined up Woodway Road with the Dawlish Road and with the Gorway Mansion. This was always referred to as the "moat".

The old lane which had linked Woodway Road with Dawlish Road and Gorway Mansion. Known to the Griffith family as the "moat".

The boundary walls are of old "Devon hedges" in several places, with stone sides and planted with fine oaks, elms, and other trees and shrubs. The field beyond the front garden was called the Lea Field on the 1890 OS map, indicating that it was the first of the farm fields originally created from tree felling, etc. when the farm was established.

The duck house is a cob-built building, sadly no longer thatched.

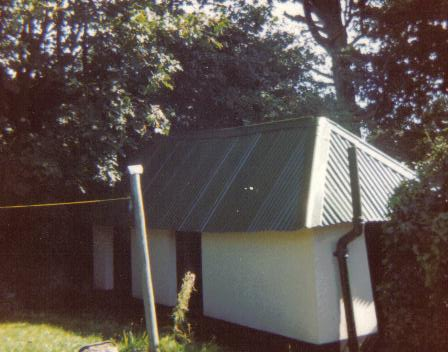
The old cob-built duck house

A duck pond was located nearby, but no sign of this remains. A number of white glazed earthenware eggs have been found in the soil around this spot, being used to encourage a broody hen or duck to lay more eggs. Cherry laurel bushes bordered the lawn on the right facing the bottom of the garden, together with a boat-shaped box hedge. The path was edged with stones that seem to have been removed from a "Devon hedge", judging by their size and type. Rose of Sharon shrubs lined the path running to the old school room at the front of the house. Barked-wood poles were used to construct the arches that covered three of the exits from the front lawn, each having trailing roses trained onto them.

A view of Wodewaye from the croquet lawn

The 1825 drawing shows a number of pine trees and a marble monument on the front lawn, topped with a flag of St. George, which commemorated the Battle of Trafalgar. Pieces of this structure were still in existence in the 1960s, dumped at the bottom of the garden. This drawing was done by Miss. P. Whalley of Deanway, Branscombe, Seaton, Devon, during the time that Thomas Spratt was living at Wodewaye.

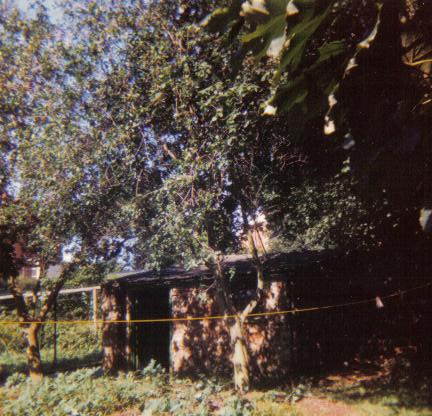
The old farm stable block

In the back garden of the house is a red sandstone building, cobbled inside, which was used latterly as the woodshed and fuel store (paraffin, diesel, etc.) A collapsed stable lay to the right-hand side as viewed from the front. The floor was lined with bricks with a central drainage channel and drain. This building had been two stories high and was probably used for the farm horses, the coach or "trap" horses, usually hackneys being kept in the stable off from the central courtyard of the old farm buildings. Near the old greenhouse in the back garden was an "apple rack" with several drawers for storing the crop from the orchard. This apple rack was used until the 1970s when the structure became unsound and was not replaced. The rack can be seen in the drawing illustrated here.

== Design and construction ==
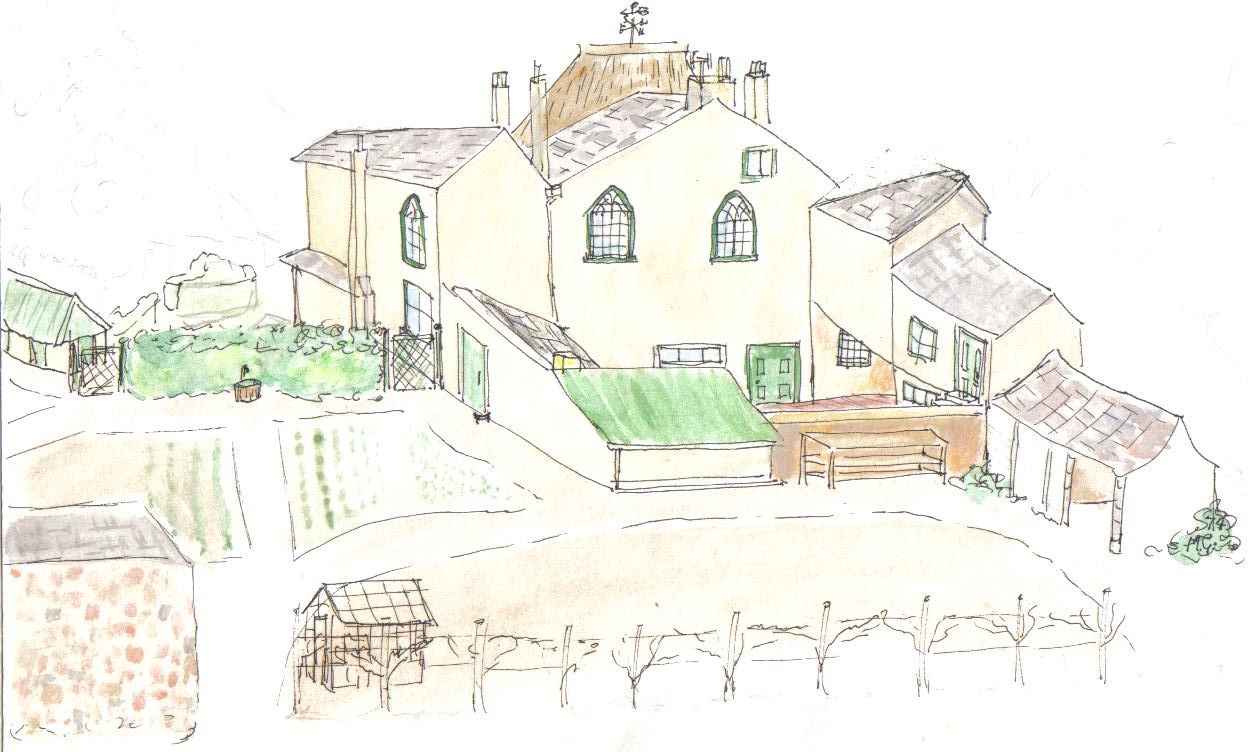
A view of the back of Woodway House drawn by Mrs. Griffith to show the apple rack, barn and greenhouse which are no longer present

Woodway House shows three clear phases of construction, with the cottage orné of the early 19th century, the old farm buildings and the tutor's living quarters and a classroom, built before 1825. James Spratt had three sons and six daughters, making home tuition both economical and appropriate.

The cobbled courtyard with the old pump, granite trough and covered well

The identifiable remains of the old farm buildings consist firstly of a barn with a hay loft that collapsed in a gale and was demolished in the 1960s. A cobbled courtyard with a deep well, granite trough and pump surrounded by outbuildings which include an upper story which had a ladder running up to it, probably for access to the stable hand's dwelling. Another pump was located inside the side wing which was the boiler house, with its chimney. The clothes were boiled here on washing days and the pump drew water from the well outside, using a system of lead pipes. A door from the courtyard, now removed, led directly into the main room of what was the living area of the farm. This large room still had a "polished" mud floor in 1951 and the large kitchen fireplace is still present. In the floor of this room was a hatch that led down to a bottle shaped storage cellar with a wood ladder, hidden when the floor was tiled over in the 1950s.

An old Gothic chapel-style window, later converted into a plain window and then blocked up when the extension was built onto the front of the farmhouse in 1815.

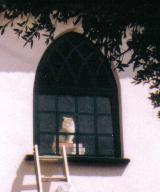
The false or blocked up chapel-style window with a "painted on" cat looking through the window panes.

The cottage orné part of the dwelling is built of cob, the foundations of the walls being only huge split oak trunks resting on the native bedrock of red sandstone. The walls are between three and four feet thick, giving a cool building in summer and a good insulation against the cold of winter. The thatch is also a highly effective insulator. The Devon saying is that "All cob wants is a good hat and a good pair of shoes", meaning that cob will last for hundreds of years as long as water is kept away. Its other value is that, unlike bricks, the material is a single unit, giving great integrity and stability. Unfortunately Woodway suffered from water damage in the late 1980s due to an old chimney flue open to the rain. This necessitated much remedial work and construction of a substantial side buttress. The height of the old farm dwelling was considerably increased when the cottage orné was added.

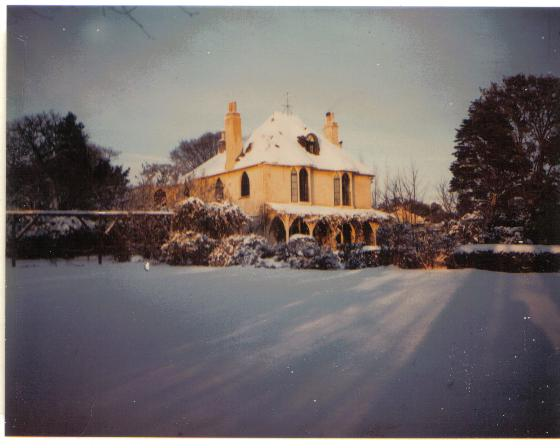
Woodway House in the snow, showing the high insulation properties of thatch.

A rare survival internally is the system of bell pulls and bells installed to summon servants to the various living rooms and bedrooms of the house. This system works via wires and pulleys which all lead to the area outside the big kitchen, this being the servants area of the house in Victorian times. The system still worked in the 1980s. A number of ornate fireplaces survived, although some were hidden behind wood screens. A constant concern was the chance of setting the thatch alight. The 1825 drawing shows no weather cock, however one was added later and acted also as a lightning conductor. The French windows are a major part of the design effect, as they seem to run continuously from the ground to the first floor of the building. Inside, these windows had large wood screens that could be unfolded to close off these ground floor "doors" or windows as they effectively are on the first floor. The rolls of black cloth used to black out the other windows during World War II were still stored in the attic in the 1970s.

The front door is enclosed by a porch, however the design of the front door surround shows that it was built to be exposed to the weather and the porch was added later. A false or blocked up Gothic chapel-style window faces the driveway. With the age of this part of the house, it is possible that the window was blocked up to save on window tax after the new schoolroom and tutors living quarters were added.

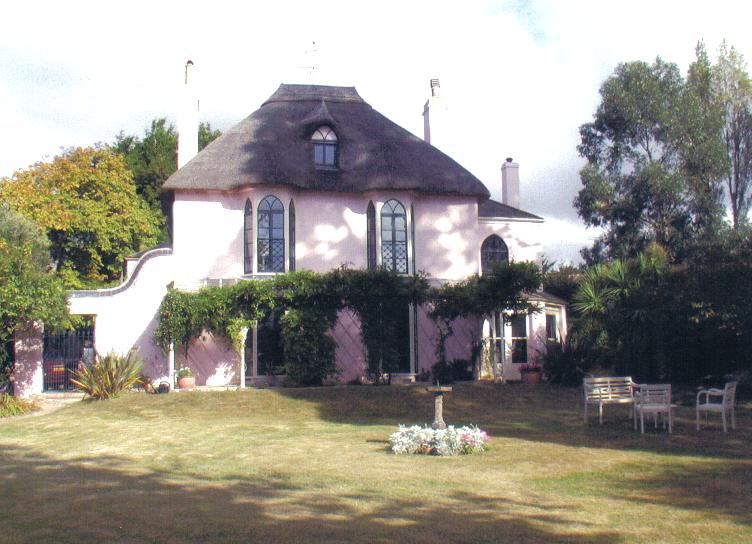
A view from the front lawn showing the new side buttress

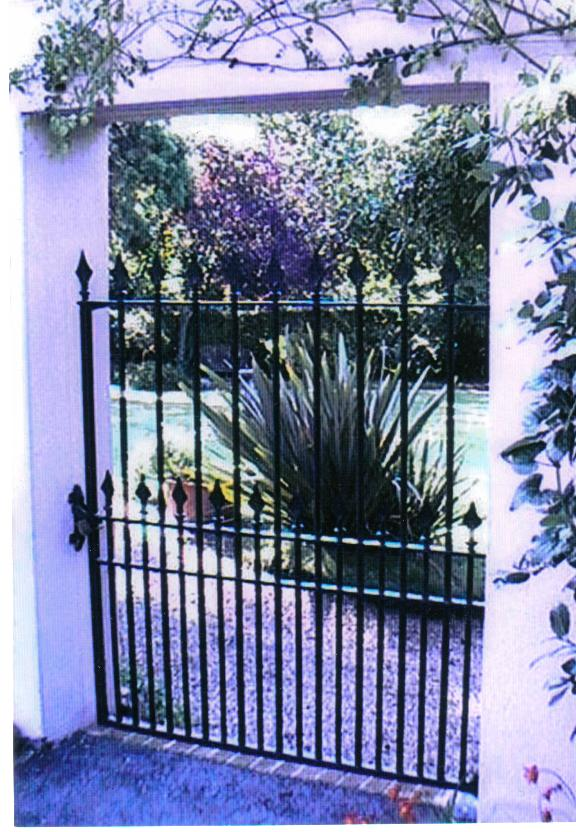
A view onto the front lawn through the gate in the new side buttress

== Thomas Abel Brimage Spratt ==
Thomas Abel Brimage Spratt was the eldest surviving son, of James Spratt. Thomas was born at Woodway House in 1811. He left home to join the Royal Navy in 1827 at the age of 16. His forty-year career (1832–1863) was mainly spent with the surveying service in the Mediterranean. He married Sophia Price, daughter of Edward Price Esq. in February 1844 and had a son, Edward J. H. Spratt, who is recorded as being an army major in 1888.

Thomas Spratt, vice-admiral, born at Woodway House in 1811

His Royal Navy role was as a surveyor and hydrographer, however his mentor, Captain Graves, encouraged him to study archaeology, history, geology, palaeontology, natural history and even numismatics. He had a considerable coin collection based on the Mediterranean countries. He was a friend of and corresponded with Edward Forbes, the noted naturalist (12 February 1815 - 18 November 1854), born at Douglas, in the Isle of Man.

He was involved with developing cable laying techniques and carried out extensive survey work for the French and British allied forces during the Crimean War. For his services he was promoted captain in 1855 and awarded the C.B. and the distinction of officer, 4th. class, Legion d'honneur by Napoleon III. He also received the Baltic, Crimean and Turkish medals and the Alma clasp. He carried out extensive survey work connected with improving the defences of the island of Malta. 1863 saw the end of his service afloat, due to his recurring malaria. He rose to rear-admiral by 1872 and vice-admiral in 1878. He died in 1888 at his home in Clare Lodge, Ephrain Road, Tunbridge Wells. His name continues in the form of several books dedicated to him and two extinct species named in his honour.

=== The Teignmouth Bar or Sprat sands ===
Following a severe bout of malaria Thomas Spratt was given home sick-leave. As a result, he was able to spend the years 1848-49 studying the movements of the Bar sands at Teignmouth and published a book on the subject, dedicated to Sir William Reid, Governor of Malta. The book was entitled An Investigation of the Movements of the Teignmouth Bar and he gave all his data to the Teignmouth Harbour Commission. At this time the commission were struggling to relieve the local trade from an unjust tax, levied annually by the town of Exeter. Mr. Bell an assistant engineer on the South Devon Railway spent some months confirming the accuracy of Spratt's observations.

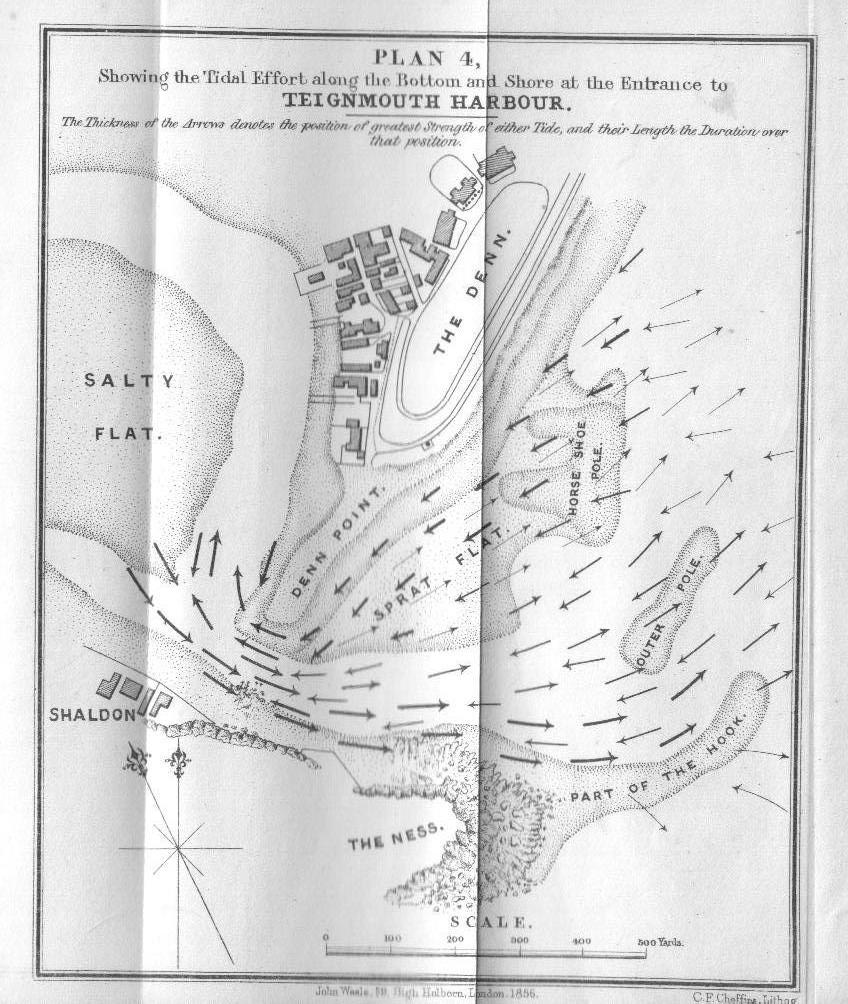
Another stage in the sand movement cycle at Teignmouth.

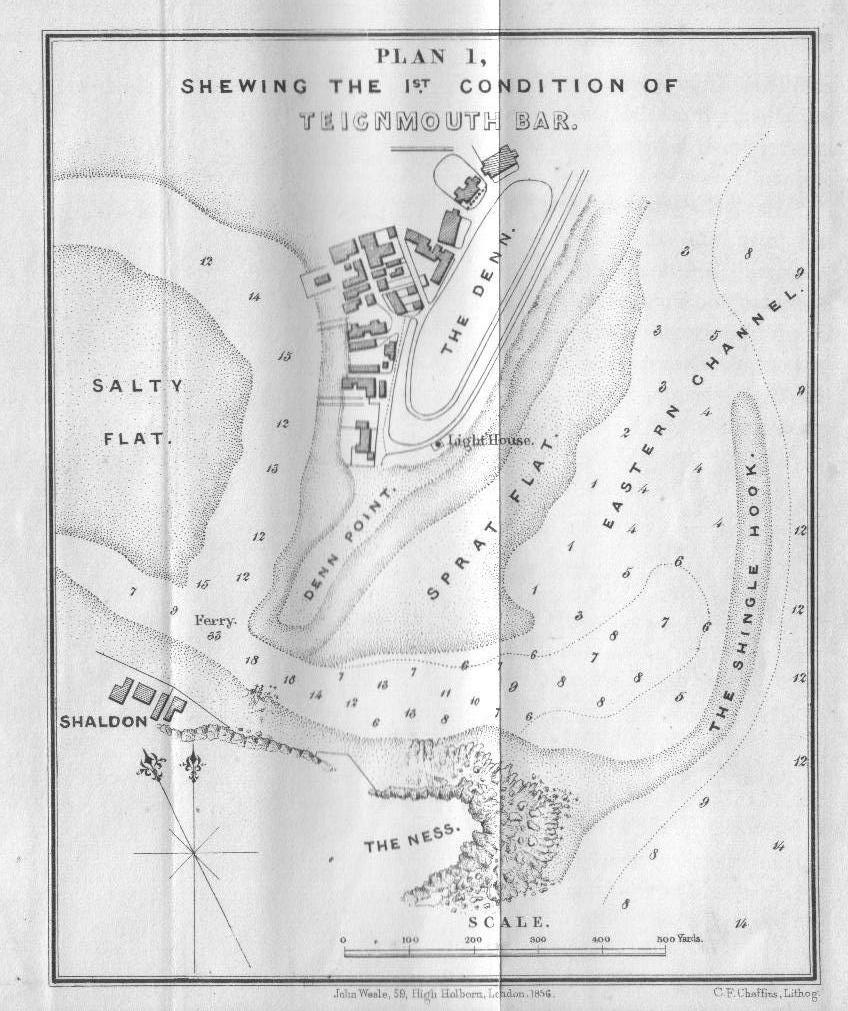
A plan showing one stage in the cycle of the sand movements at the Teignmouth.

Isambard Kingdom Brunel, who had bought an estate at Watcombe, congratulated Captain Thomas Spratt on his scheme to improve the promenade and the harbour entrance at the same time; "I never read a more sensible, concise and practical discussion of such a subject".

The main improvements were never carried out, however some dredging works were implemented in 1857 near the Den Point following complaints from mariners. In 1865 yet further dredging works were carried out, and a groyne 330 yards long was later built out from abreast of Ferry Point to arrest sand. Spratt also published a plan of the revolving movements of the sands at the Exmouth Bar.

Although a different spelling, it seems possible that the "Sprat sands" were named after him.

Teignmouth Den Seafront showing the old library, hotel and the Ness in the background, circa 1830

== Gardens and wildlife ==
An old orchard with twenty or so trees was complemented by a new orchard planted in the late 1960s. A wide variety of cooking and eating apples were joined by pear tree varieties, cherries and plums. The flora of the old orchard sward was dominated by primroses and violets.

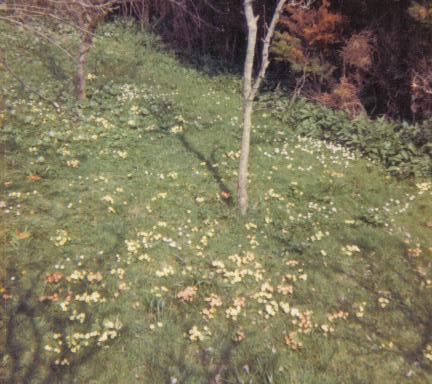
A view of the primrose dominated sward of the old orchard as it was in the 1970s

Detailed plans of these primroses were plotted yearly in the 1970s to show the change in distribution. In addition to the wild type, white, red, pink and multi-headed varieties grew here. Green alkanet (Pentaglottis sempervirens) grew here, together with black bryony, flowering currant, horseradish, butcher's broom (Ruscus aculeatus), bluebells (blue, pink and white), Aquilegia and other several other species.

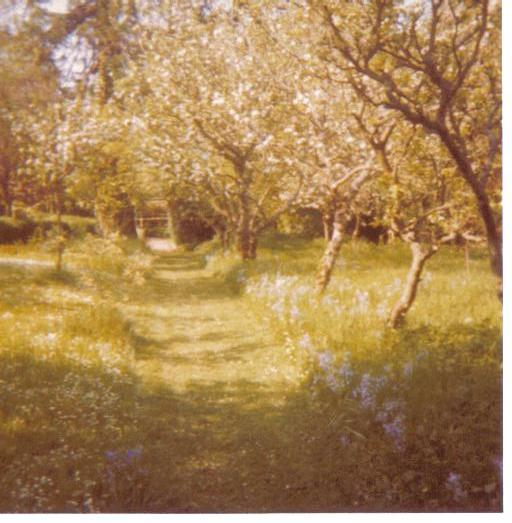
The old and new orchards with a profusion of bluebells in full flower.

The grounds of the house were particularly rich in ferns, mosses, liverworts, and lichens. The lichens grow in profusion on the old walls, slate roofing tiles and tree bark, especially of the older specimen trees, such as the pedunculate oak (Quercus robur), sessile oak (Quercus petraea), horse-chestnuts and the copper beeches (Fagus sylvatica cuprea). Xanthoria parietina was a common lichen growth on the boiler house tiles. The giant sequoia (Sequoiadendron giganteum) has many small depressions in its bark made by treecreepers.

A feature of the garden running down from the verandah is the New Zealand cabbage trees (Cordyline australis) growing to the left hand side when facing. These can be seen in the 1825 drawing and although the main growth was killed off by severe winters, new growths always appeared. Old wisteria trees are a feature of the verandah, together with passion flowers and banksia roses.

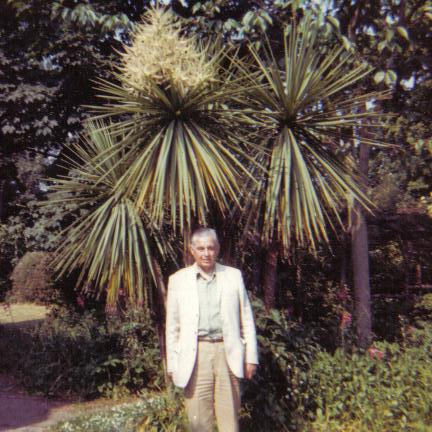
The New Zealand cabbage tree in flower with Mr.J.Ll. Griffith in the foreground

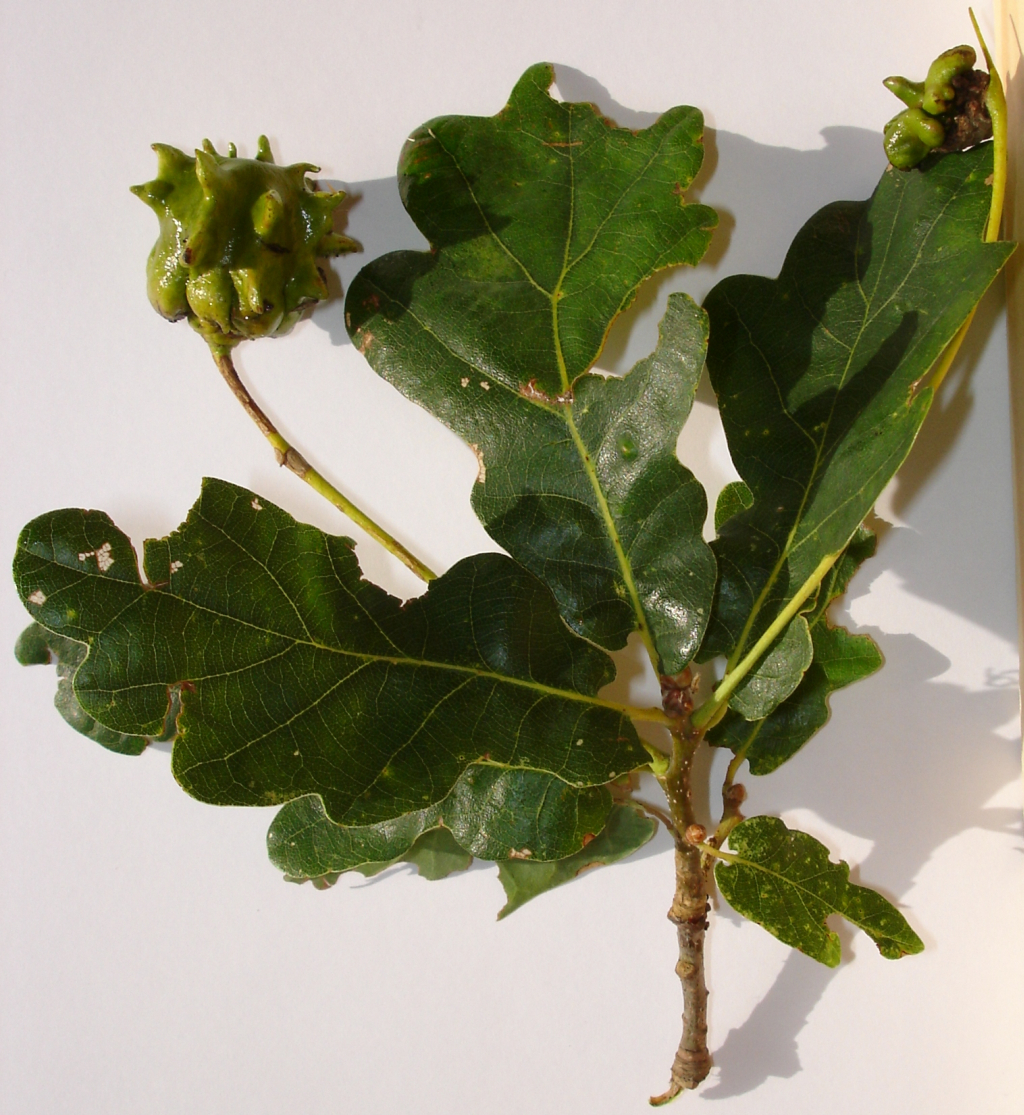
Galls (upper left and right). A knopper gall formed on an acorn on the branch of an English oak tree by the parthenogenetic gall wasp Andricus quercuscalicis.

The grounds had many fine trees, and in addition to those already mentioned, there were Monterey cypress (Cupressus macrocarpa), common yew (Taxus baccata), Laburnum, Turkey oaks (Quercus cerris), black poplar, strawberry tree, elms (Ulmus spp.) and holm oaks (Quercus ilex). The knopper gall grows from a distortion of the growing acorn, greatly reducing the fecundity of the oak host. It has a two phase life-cycle that requires both pedunculate oak and Turkey oak. Woodway gardens have this species and Woodway House was one of the first places in Devon to record both life-cycle stages of this invading insect. The insect concerned (Andricus quercuscalicis) came from the continent to Devon via the Channel Islands. Large numbers of knopper galls were sent from Woodway for research purposes in the late 1970s when the infestation first struck (Griffith 2006). A feature of the old hedge forming a boundary by the garage was the pennywort (Umbilicus rupestris) a typical plant of Devon country lanes. The winter heliotrope is a distinctive weed species and lady's smock is an early spring flower.

Insects were abundant, particularly butterflies such as the red admiral, peacock, fritillary, cabbage white and large "hawking" species of dragonflies, such as the common hawker (Aeshna juncea). This last species was common in the area of the old duck pond. Wasp nests were a common occurrence in the old hedge walls and both red ants and black ants were to be found under stones beside the pathways. Mammals included hedgehogs, shrews, mice and pipistrelle bats, which were common, as were grey squirrels. Amphibian species were frogs and toads in wetter places such as the old pampas on the front lawn.

The Monterey pines were for many years the site of a rookery. A number of robin territories were present in the garden; the breeding season boundaries plotted using red wool "male substitutes" with careful observation of the defending males. Thrush "anvils" were mostly present on larger stones bordering the front drive and starlings were a frequent visitor to the raspberry beds and to the thatch, stealing straw for their nests. This necessitated the use of chicken-wire to protect the thatch. Wrens were common, often lining their nests with the fur from the family pet, a long haired silver Persian cat. Blackbirds are common and redwings are an occasional visitor.

== The Woodway ghosts ==
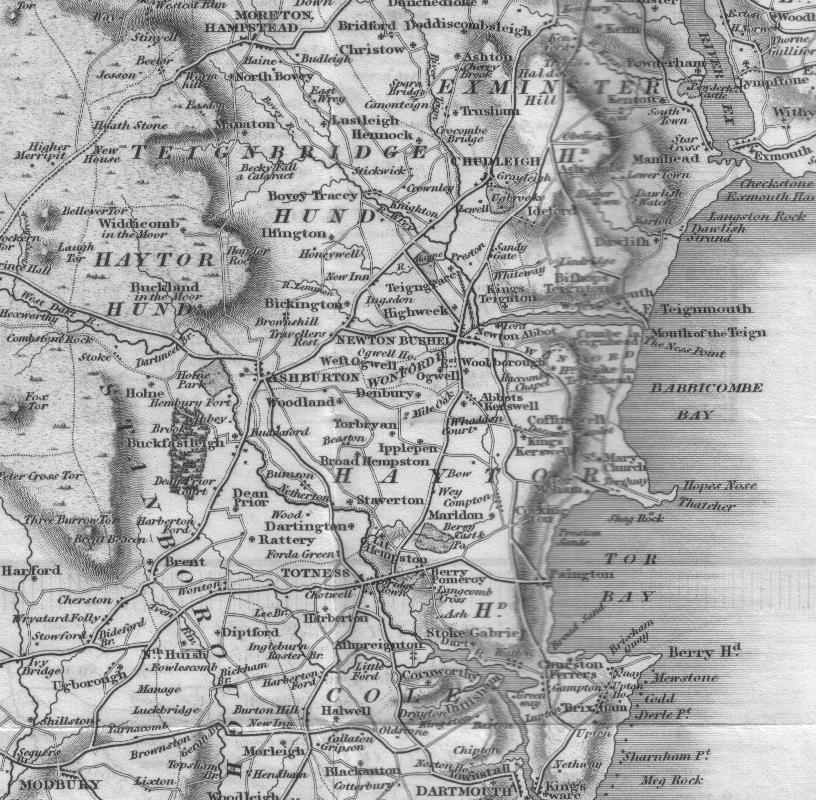
The area around Teignmouth in the 1830s. (Carrington c. 1830)

When the Griffith family moved in, a helper commented on the "pretty young ladies in old fashioned dresses" in the attic rooms. These were the bedrooms of the Spratt sisters at one time and it seems they never wanted to leave their beloved Woodway. At a later stage one of these rooms housed a large railway set and for some reason the short distance up this last flight of stairs always seemed particularly spooky to young Roger Griffith, its builder.

An old relative (Mrs. Wilson) had a main bedroom at the front of the house and frequently commented on the Victorian gentleman who walked into her room through the door beside her bed. No door existed here and the matter was dismissed, however when the room was redecorated a door was found to have existed at the position indicated. The bedroom next door had been a room where the family prepared themselves before coming into the morning room to greet guests.

A more recent ghost is said to be that of Gordon Griffith, who had shared this room with his brother. He died when only 12 years old in May 1963. The same old lady (Gordon's grandmother) would say that Gordon would often come and sit beside her bed, keeping her company in the mornings as she read her paper. Mrs Wilson has also been seen sitting in a chair beside the fireplace in what was her room for many years.

== 1851 Census and other records of occupancy ==
In the 1851 Census, Woodway Cottage was occupied by James, now aged 80, his wife Jane, née Brimage, aged 56, Louisa aged 32, Jane aged 30, Margaret and Leah, twins, aged 20, Isabella aged 16 and James's grandson, Edward, aged 5. The daughters are all unmarried. Thomas's son Edward is living here, his father having returned to sea after being on sick-leave at Teignmouth in 1848, 1849 and early 1850. Sophia, Thomas's wife is not recorded as living here, presumably giving birth to Edward in Malta in 1850. Under a separate household, still headed by James, is his sister-in-law Leah Brimage, surprisingly titled the "House Proprietor" aged 52 and unmarried, together with Harriet Wise a "housemaid" and Charlotte Webber a "Maid of All Work". Maybe the term "House Keeper" was intended as she is grouped with the servants. John Brimage, a retired farmer and probably Jane's older brother has moved to Holcombe, where he is recorded as living as a widow with his daughter or possibly granddaughter Jane, aged 30 in 1851. This "well to do" family had a governess, five children and six farm laborers working a 110-acre (0.4 km^{2}) farm.

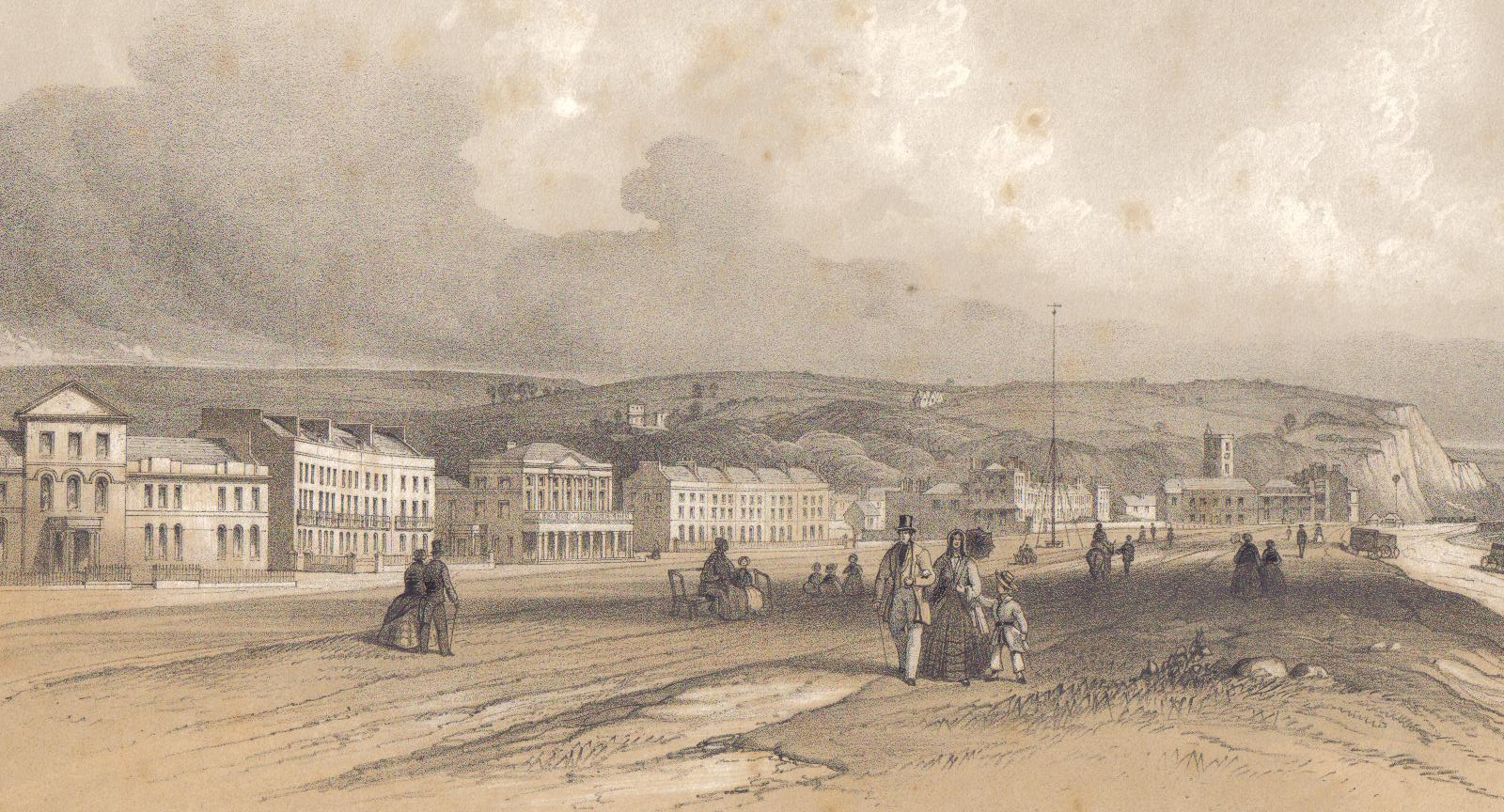
A view of East Teignmouth and its church in the mid-19th century. Extensive woodlands run up Woodway to a house with a verandah which may be a representation of Woodway House with Goreway off to one side.

By 1881 James and his wife have died and the family have moved to Melita, a house further up Woodway Road, near the old Woodway Nursery and opposite Luchana. Melita is the Latin name for Malta. It is not clear what the connection with Thomas Spratt is, however Jane and Isabella Spratt are living here as unmarried sisters, together with their married sister Margaret and her husband Richard T. Langley. Thomas may have purchased this property as he ceased going to sea in 1863 and had a number of land based duties, although he had a house in Sudbury, where he died in 1888. Woodway Cottage is occupied in 1881 by an American family from New York State, named Boyd. They have a German governess and three servants in residence. A Boyd Road is the name of a new road in a housing estate nearby.

The street directory lists a Woodway, a Woodway Cottage and a Wodeway. A Miss Spratt is at Woodway Cottage in 1866, however a Mrs. Butler is given for 1869. In 1873 a James Pitt Pitts is listed and in 1882 a Vice-Admiral Barnard. The first record of the Whalleys appears for 1888, with Colonel, Mrs. and family. In 1889 Whalley, Lieut.-Col., Percy Charles R.A. as at Wodewaye and the name is kept as Wodewaye from this point until the 1950s.

== Thatching the Cottage orne ==
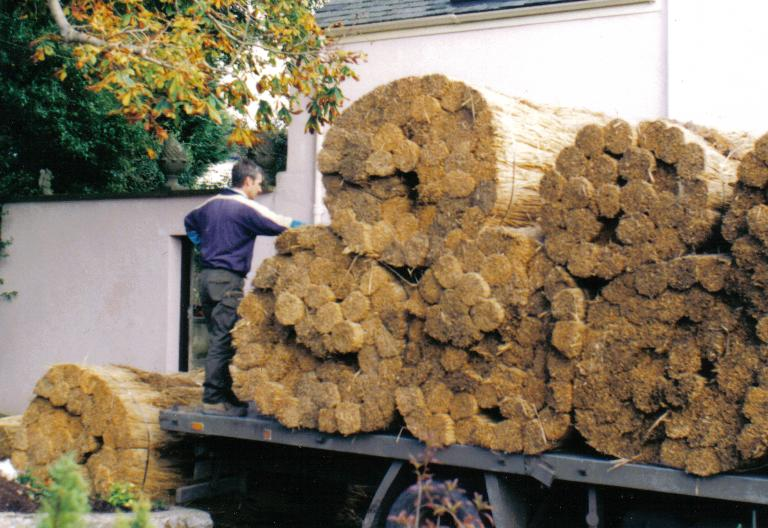
Bundles or yealms of thatching straw at Woodway House

Thatch requires a fair degree of maintenance, with various birds, such as the rooks and seagulls, stealing thatch to build their nests. The damage could be visually and physically significant, leading to leaks and rapid decay. Attempts to scare the seagulls away using a rifle and 'dum-dum' bullets were rather too dangerous and the only effective solution was to cover the thatch with chicken wire where it was most susceptible. Laying thatch is a very specialized craft and fortunately Devon still has a number of thatchers. The pitch of the roof is one critical feature of a thatched building, essentially having to be steep enough to ensure the rapid runoff of water without pools forming. Special and expensive insurance is required and this has led to a number of buildings being slated or covered with corrugated iron to reduce costs but at the expense of the outward appeal of the building.

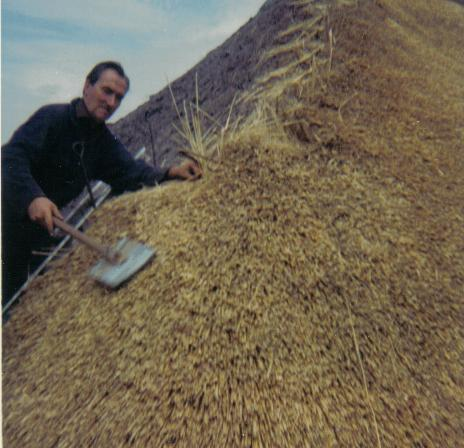
The thatcher at work on the cottage orne portion of Woodway House

== 1951 sale ==
The then owner, Lt.,-Col.P.R. Whalley, D.S.O., put Wodewaye up for sale by Waycotts on Tuesday, 19 June 1951 at 3p.m. at the Queen's Hotel, Torquay. It was the first time this listed building had been on the market for 65 years. Wodeaye is described as 'The Intriguing Freehold Cottage Residence known as Wodewaye, Woodway Road. It is described as Gothic with a thatched roof, with two other parts of different ages. A garage built of asbestos is described, but this was later demolished by Mr. Griffith and a concrete double garage built to replace it. The sale catalogue confirms that the 'school wing' was added after the construction of the 'Cottage Orne'. The front porch is referred to as a 'Conservatory Entrance' with a hall leading from here to a double lounge or Morning Room.

The setting is said to be remarkable, as the land amounted to one and a quarter acres.

== Micro history ==
Knowle Cottage was a cottage ornée in a similar style to Woodway House, built in Sidmouth by Lord Le Despencer in about 1820.

A large collection of old clay pipes stalks and bowls found in the rear vegetable gardens built up over the years. They were cheap and disposable, so this is not surprising. Many children must have lived at the house judging from the numerous clay toys, such as dogs, miniature tea sets, clay dolls, etc. that have been found. These finds were mostly in the vegetable garden and the field at the back of the property. They were transported there with the horse manure, the 'night soil' from the occupants of the house being added to the midden at the stable before being used as fertilizer. Small items of household rubbish were often added to the 'night soil'. Much of this collection is now held by Teignmouth Museum.

A young Gordon Griffith dropped a significant number of silver items of cutlery down the well in the late 1950s, so that he could hear the 'plop' sound as they hit the water. The well was covered with a large sandstone slab in those days, with a small hole at the front leading edge.

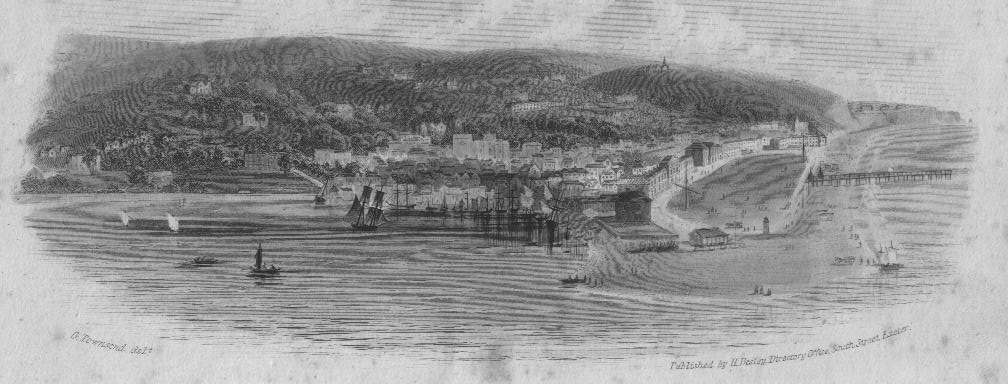
A view across the Teign estuary looking towards Teignmouth with Woodway House; Barnpark and Goreway discernible

Commander Whalley's old sea chest is entailed with the house as a memorial to the Whalley family.

A ropewalk is shown on an 1842 map of Teignmouth, running parallel to the road from near Barn Park House, passed Trafalgar Cottage to end opposite East Cliff House.

A number of Trafalgar veterans settled down in East Teignmouth, with Trafalgar Cottage, James Spratt's first home, below Gorway, Robert Young at Minadab, only a short distance away, and Henry Bellairs of HMS Spartiate at Cliffden.

Window tax was first levied in England in 1696 to offset the expenses of making up the gold and silver deficiency in the re-coinage of William III reign caused by clipping and filing of coins. It was set at two shillings for small tenements, six shillings for buildings with up to ten windows and ten shillings for those with twenty windows. Cottages were exempt. To encourage the handing in of coins the authorities had decided to accept coins at their face value and not their weight. It was based on the number of windows in a house and large mansions often had many existing windows blocked up, such as a whole side of Loudoun Castle, in Ayrshire, Scotland. It was repealed in 1851 and replaced by a tax on inhabited houses.

Minadab at Holcombe is another Strawberry Hill style cottage, but of altogether a more eccentric construction. It was built in 1820 by Robert Benjamin Young, born in 1773. He was one of Admiral Lord Nelson's captains and he built his cottage to resemble a ship as much as possible, the east side being the fore end and the west side the after end. The upper floor was reached by means of a rope ladder. It has a round cellar with places for storing casks of rum. Young was a lieutenant in 1795 on the Bonne Citoyenne at the Battle of Cape St Vincent in 1797 and he was in command of the frigate cutter Entreprenant in 1804 and fought on her at Trafalgar and later at the blockade of Brest. The Minidab was a French ship, but the significance of the ship is not known.

A View up the Driveway in the 1960s

Cob is a carefully blended mixture of wet earth, containing enough lime to enable it to set hard. Also added are chopped reeds or straw, animal dung, sand, gravel and small stones as ballast. Cob walls are seldom less than two and as much as four feet thick. These were built up in layers of about six to twelve inches thick and each had to set before the next was added. A two-story building could take anything up to two years to finish. The building up was done by eye, leading to the classic rounded and undulating appearance of cob walls.

Old Cotmaton Cottage in Sidmouth is another example of a 'Strawberry Hill' romantic gothic-style construction.
