= James Spratt (Royal Navy officer) =

British Royal Navy officer

Commander James Spratt (1771–1853) was a British officer in the Royal Navy. He became known as one of the heroes of the Battle of Trafalgar. Spratt was also the father of Thomas Abel Brimage Spratt, English vice-admiral, hydrographer and geologist.

Commander James Spratt was famous for having dived into the sea from HMS Defiance, swimming cutlass in teeth to the French 74-gun Aigle, boarding her single handed. Climbing in through a stern window, he found his way to the French poop deck and threw himself on the French crew, one man against several hundred. In the melee he killed two French seamen, and was grappling with a third when he fell from the poop deck to the main deck, killing his opponent but injuring himself badly. He was saved by the timely arrival of a full boarding party from Defiance, but his gallantry cost him his career. His wounds left him with one leg shorter than the other and he retired to Teignmouth, Devon, where he became renowned as a long-distance swimmer.

== Life ==
Spratt was born in Harold's Cross, Dublin, on 3 May 1771. At the age of 25 in 1796 he joined the Royal Navy. His father was Spratt Esq., of Ballybeg, near Mitcheltown and his brother-in-law was John Abel Ward, Esq., a judge in the Admiralty Court in Nevis. After some years in the merchant service, he joined the navy as a first class volunteer. He was promoted midshipman in 1798 aboard HMS Bellona and he was at the Battle of Copenhagen in 1801.

He gained fame for his exploits at the Battle of Trafalgar in 1805, aged 34. He was a master's mate on Captain Philip Charles Durham's ship, the 74 gun HMS Defiance. The ship was attempting to board a French ship, the L'Aigle. After the first attempt the log records that:

A certain Mr.Spratt, an active young master's mate, took his cutlass between his teeth and his battle-axe in his belt, called to the 50 other boarders he was leading to follow, leapt over board and swam to the L'Aigle, followed by a few men; he got in at the stern gun port up the rudder chains and was met by some of the crew, who resisted. He swung on a rope to avoid three grenadiers, then killed two with his cutlass and pushed the third down onto a lower deck where the soldier’s neck was broken, Spratt landing on top was uninjured. He succeed in cutting his way through and hauled down the Frenchman's colours, and in the act of doing so, was shot through the leg after having deflected the shot down from his chest with his cutlass.

Upon being rescued by his shipmates he dragged himself to the side of the ship, and holding his bleeding limb over the railing, called out, "Captain, poor Jack Spratt is done up at last!" Captain Durham was able to warp alongside, and Spratt was slung on board. He had also saved a French officer's life before being shot, officers being reserved for ransom or exchange.

James (Jack) Spratt

Spratt, who was badly hit, with both the tibia and fibula being shot through, refused to have his leg amputated, and the surgeon, feeling the operation was essential, asked the captain for a written order to authorise him to take the leg off. This was refused, though Durham promised to argue the matter with James, despite having three wounds himself. Spratt held out his other leg, which was a very good one, and said: "Never; if I lose my leg, where shall I find a match for this?" Spratt was made a lieutenant after the action, and did not in fact lose his leg, although it was three inches shorter than the other.

A gruesome tale is told of his sufferings in hospital. He had such pain and fever that he could not keep still to allow his bones to knit together. The solution was to place his leg in a locked and padded box, however he complained of pains and discomfort that was not seemingly connected with his wounds. The box was opened and a spectacle presented itself to the view of the medical officers present unparalleled in the history of their experience. Hundreds of maggots an inch long were stuck into the calf with only the tips of their tails to be seen, the remainder of their bodies being embedded in the flesh. With some difficulty they removed them, not realising that the maggots had cleaned out his wounds and were probably the reason for his ultimate recovery.

James (Jack) Spratt was buried in the Teignmouth Cemetery in 1852.

He was 17 weeks in hospital in Gibraltar recovering and returned to England to take command of a signal station in Teignmouth between 1806 and 1813. At this time he invented the homograph, an early form of semaphore, for which he was presented with the Society of Arts silver medal by the Duke of Norfolk in May 1809. He served a year on the Albion with Captain John Ferris Devonshire until invalided home due to the terrible pains in his leg caused by the cold. After this he commanded the prison ship Ganges at Plymouth, before being pensioned off in 1838 at £91 5s. per year as a commander retired and with awards of £50 and later £30 from the Patriotic Society for his wound.

He married Jane Brimage on 4 April 1809 and had six daughters and three sons, living first at Trafalgar Cottage and later moving to the house he built, Woodway Cottage. Jane was the daughter of Thomas Brimage, a yeoman from East Teignmouth. Spratt died in 1852.

James Spratt was commended on nine occasions for saving men from drowning either off Teignmouth or at sea when he was serving in the navy. On one occasion he leapt into the sea and saved a drowning sailor who was in between two sharks. On his 60th birthday he swam the 14 miles (23 km) from Teignmouth to the Ore Stone off Brixham and back to win a wager he had made with a French officer. Spratt was a well-known figure in Teignmouth, riding his sturdy Dartmoor pony and usually wrapped in his old weather-stained naval cloak. The sailormen of his acquaintance never tired of telling how Jack Spratt came by his useless leg for Teignmouth was proud of the reason and the man.

== HMS Defiance ==
HMS Defiance was built by Randall and Co., at Rotherhithe on the River Thames, and saw extensive action before the Battle of Trafalgar. She served in Nelson's fleet at the Battle of Copenhagen 1801, where she fought gallantly against the Holsteen and the shore based batteries of the Trekroner. In July 1805 before Trafalgar she had taken part in Admiral Robert Calder’s fight with a combined French and Spanish fleet off the coast of Portugal.

Captain Durham claimed that she was the fastest 74-gun ship in the British fleet. Nonetheless Defiance was placed at the rear of Admiral Collingwood's line, and the battle was well advanced before she fired her first broadside. After exchanging fire with the Spanish Principe de Asturias (112 guns) Defiance engaged the French L'Aigle, already badly damaged by HMS Bellerophon. After silencing her, Defiance drifted away, and her master's mate James Spratt offered to lead a boarding party that would have to swim across because all the boats had been destroyed. Spratt was well known on Defiance as an excellent swimmer, who had saved two men from drowning, and a fighter of some reputation, who had been appointed by Captain Durham to lead any boarding party and swimming across to L'Aigle. Armed only with a cutlass, Spratt climbed the rudder chain, entered through the stern ports, and was engaged in cutting down the French ensign on the stern before the crew of L'Aigle realised who he was. There was a short sharp fight but Defiance managed to draw alongside and L'Aigle surrendered, though not before Spratt was severely wounded in one leg. A full prize crew was now put aboard, but in the storm that followed on 22 October L'Aigle drifted away from her captor, who had not been able to take her in tow, and the French crew regained control and managed to take her into Cádiz.

It was in Woodway House, Teignmouth, that his son Thomas Abel Brimage Spratt was born in 1811 and at the age of 16 entered into the Royal Navy.
