= Nikolaos Stampolidis =

Greek archaeologist and academic

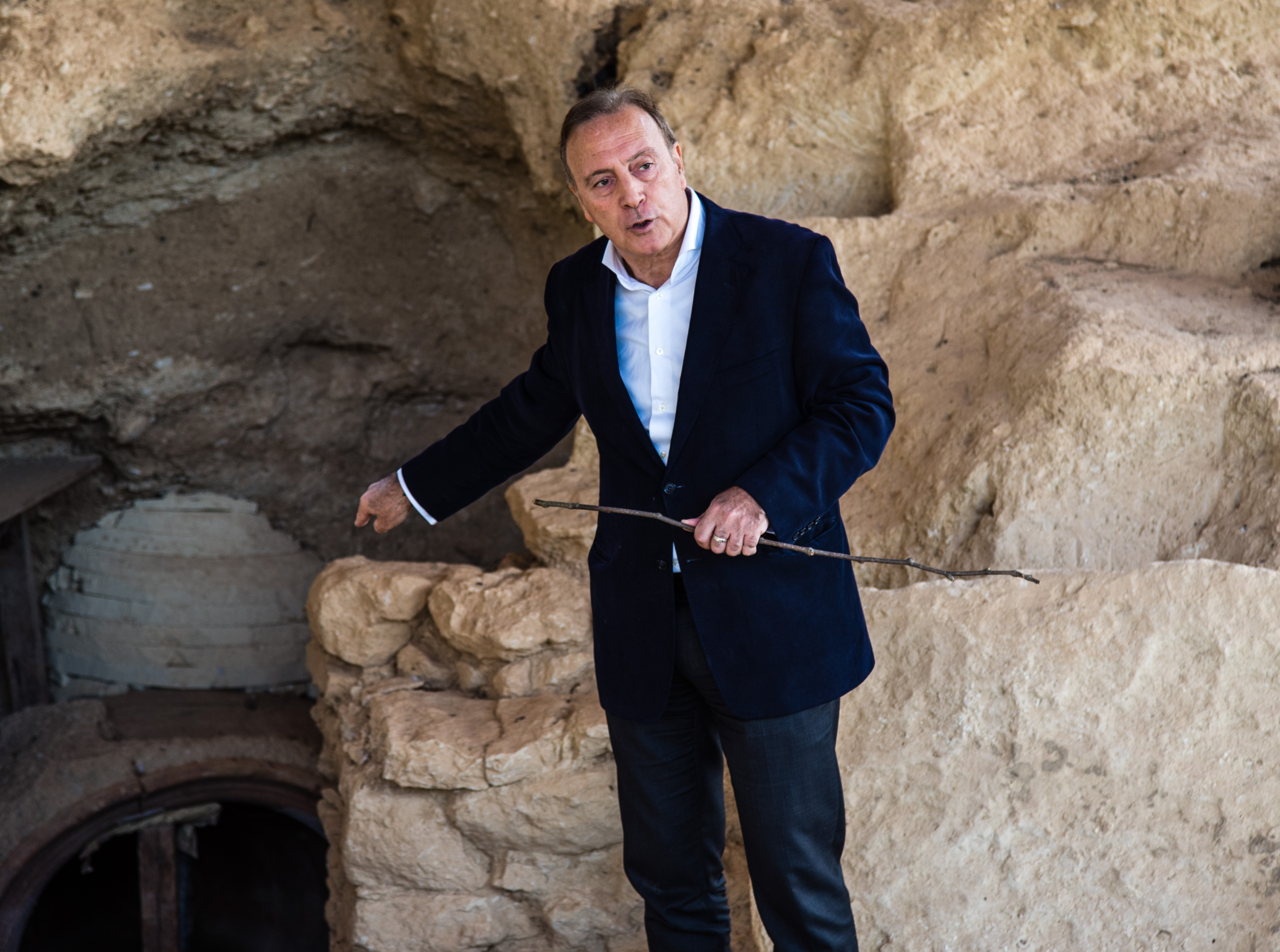
- Stampolidis in Eleutherna
- Born: 1951 (age 74–75); Chania, Greece
- Education: University of Thessaloniki; University of Bonn
- Known for: Excavation of Eleutherna
- Scientific career
- Fields: Archaeology
- Workplaces: University of Crete, Museum of Cycladic Art, Acropolis Museum

Nikolaos (Nikolas) Chr. Stampolidis ⟨Greek: Νικόλαος (Νικόλας) Χρ. Σταμπολίδης; born 1951 Chania⟩ is a Greek archaeologist who specializes in Geometric and Archaic early Greek history.

== Early life ==
Stampolidis was born and grew up in Chania, Crete. His parents were refugees from Asia Minor, who emigrated to Greece during the forced population exchange of 1923.

== Career ==
Stampolidis obtained a degree in archaeology from the Aristotle University of Thessaloniki (Department of History and Archaeology) in 1974. He then pursued graduate studies at the University of Bonn (1975-1978) and completed his doctorate at Thessaloniki (1979), where he was a student of Manolis Andronikos. In 1984, he was elected a Lecturer at the University of Crete, where he was a full Professor of Classical Archaeology, until his retirement. Stampolidis has excavated sites in Vergina, Chalkidiki, Rhodes and Crete. Since 1985, he has been excavating the site of Eleutherna. Stampolidis is also the Director of the Museum of Cycladic Art in Athens and a member of the Central Archaeological Council of Greece. He is now in charge of the general direction of the Acropolis Museum.

== Honors and awards ==
- Member of the German Archaeological Institute (DAI)
- Commander of the Order of the Phoenix of the Hellenic Republic

== See also ==
- Eleutherna
- Museum of Ancient Eleutherna
- Goulandris Museum of Cycladic Art
