= Polyrrhenia =

Former town in Greece

Coordinates: 35°27′29″N 23°39′20″E

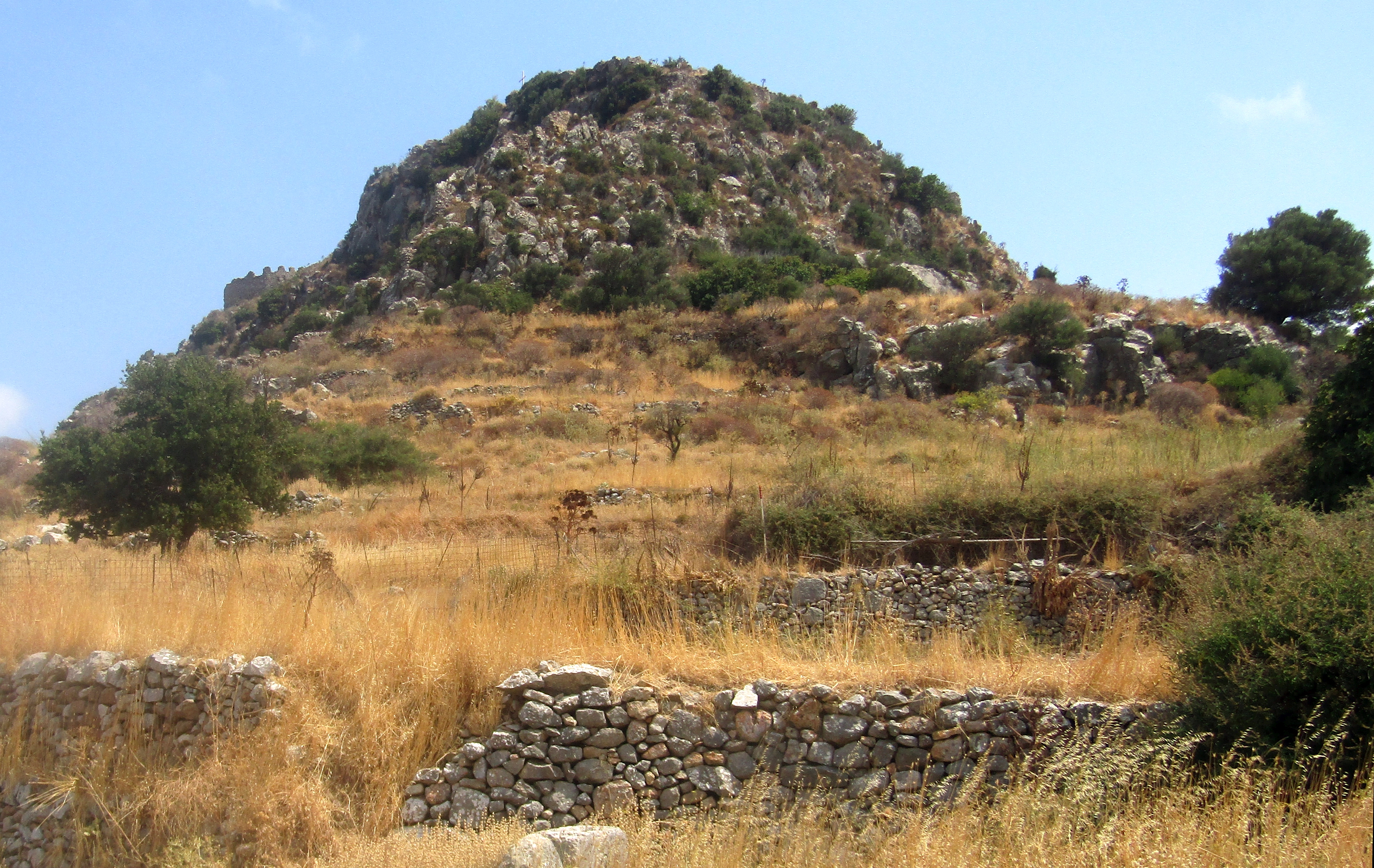
The acropolis

Polyrrhenia or Polyrrenia (Ancient Greek: Πολυρρηνία; modern Greek: Πολυρρηνία, romanized: Polyrrinia), Polyrrhen or Polyrren (Πολύρρην) or Polyren (Πολύρην), or Pollyrrhenia or Pollyrrenia (Πολλύρρηνα), or Polyrrenion (Πολυρρήνιον) or Polyrrhenium, was a town and polis (city-state) in the northwest of ancient Crete, whose territory occupied the whole western extremity of the island, extending from north to south.

== Ancient references ==
Polyrrhenia was an important Archaic Period settlement co-temporaneous with Lato and Prinias. Strabo describes it as lying west of Cydonia, at the distance of 30 stadia from the sea, and 60 from Phalasarna, and as containing a temple of Dictynna. He adds that the Polyrrhenians formerly dwelt in villages, and that they were collected into one place by the Achaeans and Lacedaemonians, who built a strong city looking towards the south.

== History ==
In the civil wars in Crete in the time of the Achaean League, 219 BCE, the Polyrrhenians, who had been subject allies of Knossos, deserted the latter, and assisted the Lyctians against that city. They also sent auxiliary troops to the assistance of the Achaeans, because the Knossians had supported the Aetolians. In a successful campaign they prevented their rival cities Knossos and Gortys from dominating the entire island and brought a large part over to the Macedonian coalition.

Polyrrhenia continued to flourish in the Roman period, when the center shifted to its erstwhile port, Cisamus, and in this urbanistic configuration lasted into Byzantine times. A Roman aqueduct built in the age of Hadrian improved water supplies.

== Status ==
The ruins of Polyrrhenia were discovered at a place called Epano Palaiokastro in the Chania regional unit. It is some 7 kilometres (4.3 mi) inland from modern Kissamos. A village of the same name has been established nearby, and the ruins are an archaeological site. The site exhibits the remains of the ancient walls, from 10 to 18 feet (3.0 to 5.5 m) high. Systematic archaeological excavations have been conducted at the site since 1986.
