= Lady of Auxerre =

Ancient Greek sculpture

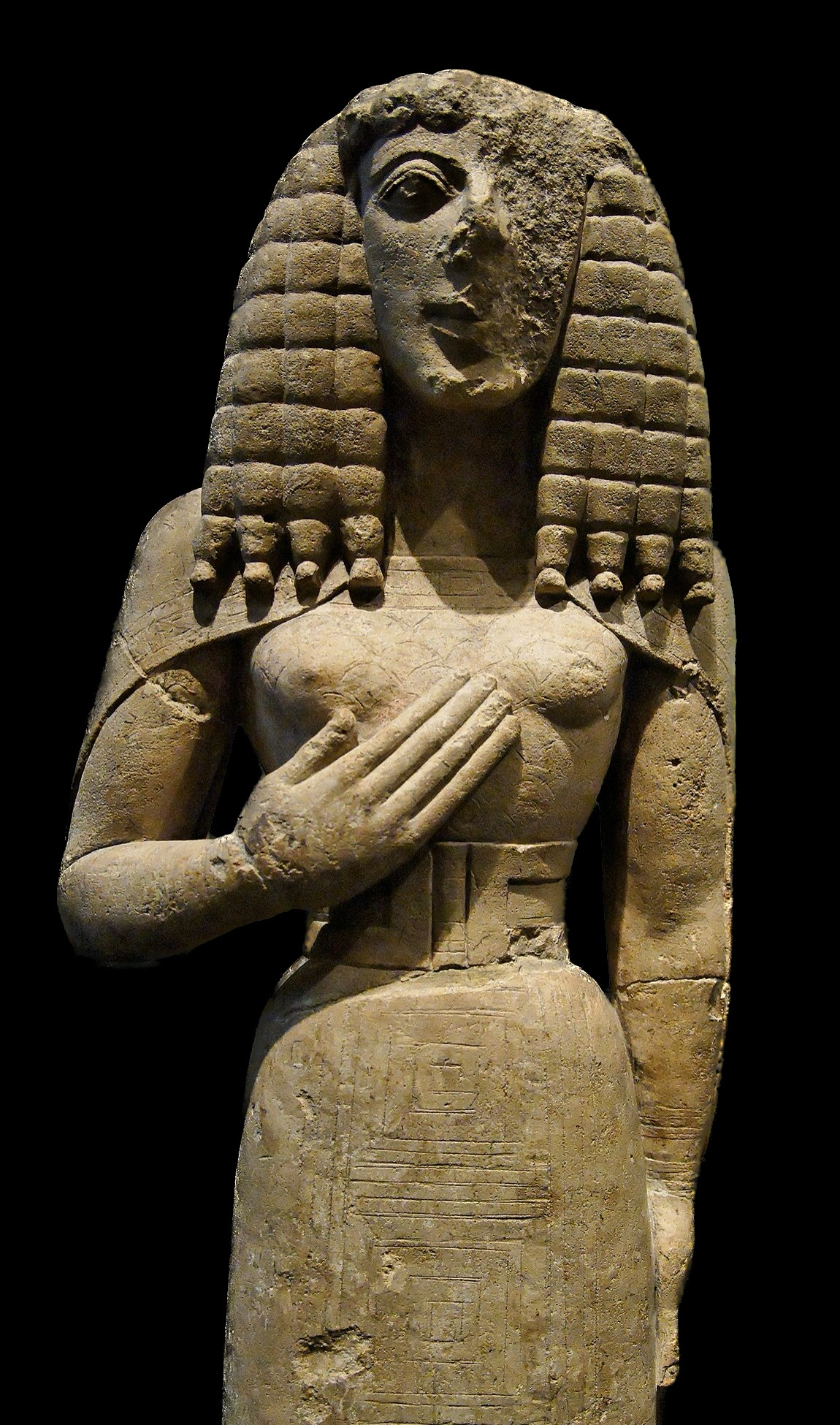
- Material: limestone
- Height: 75 cm
- Created: c. 638 BC
- Discovered: 1907; Auxerre, Bourgogne-Franche-Comte, France
- Present location: Paris, Ile-de-France, France

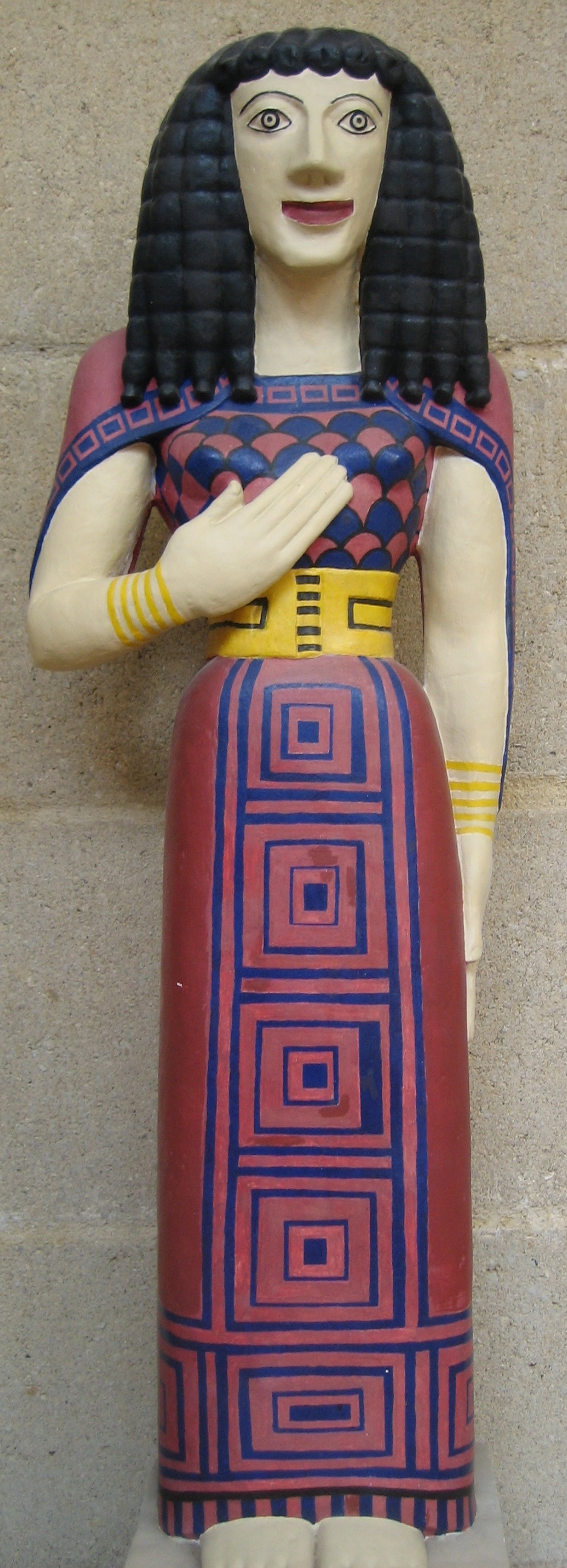
Cast of the sculpture, with putative colour reconstructed, at the Museum of Classical Archaeology, Cambridge

The relatively small (75 cm high) limestone Cretan sculpture called the Lady of Auxerre (or Kore of Auxerre), held at the Louvre Museum in Paris, depicts an archaic Greek goddess of c. 650 - 625 BCE. It is a Kore ("maiden"), perhaps a votary rather than the maiden Goddess Persephone herself, for her right hand touches her solar plexus and her left remains stiffly at her side (Basel 2001). It is also possible that the Kore is a depiction of a deceased individual, possibly in a position of prayer.

== History ==
Maxime Collignon, a Louvre curator, found the sculpture in a storage vault in the Museum of Auxerre, a city east of Paris, in 1907. No provenance is known, and its mysterious arrival at a provincial French museum gave it a journalistic allure, according to the Louvre monograph. The sculpture has been the subject of scholarly debate over what regional school of early Greek art it belongs to, but is generally considered a Cretan work.

The Archaic sculpture, bearing traces of polychrome decoration, dates from the 7th century BCE, when Greece was emerging from its Dark Age. She still has the narrow waist of a Minoan-Mycenaean goddess, and her stiff hair suggests Egyptian influence. The Early Archaic style has been fancifully termed "Daedalic." Its secret, knowing, and serene hint of a smile is often characterized as the "archaic smile." Sculptures and painted vases exhibiting correlative styles have been found outside Crete as well as in Rhodes, Corinth, and Sparta (Basel 2000). Excavations in the 1990s by Nikolaos Stampolidis at Eleutherna in Crete have helped establish more precisely a date and place of origin for the Dame d'Auxerre, in the region of Eleutherna and Gortyn, with the recovery from gravesites of very similar carved ivory faces and phallic symbols.

== Description ==
The figure and its quadrangular base are carved from the same piece of limestone, making them one piece. Her hair and costume are both modeled and incised. She wears a wide tubular dress, either a closed peplos or a woolen chiton, with a broad belt and an epiblema, or possibly the material of the back part of the dress brought forward, covering her shoulders. The dress appears neither sewn nor buttoned along the upper arms but may convey a garment that it is pinned in the front by a pair of brooches concealed by her hair.

The horizontal band crossing her chest has incised maeanders that create a scaled design. Similar designs border the garment around her shoulders. The skirt of her garment bears a vertical panel of an incised pattern in the front and is circled at the bottom by a similar incised pattern. The various incised patterns on the statue are difficult to interpret without paint, but painted casts, such as the one in the Museum of Classical Archaeology, Cambridge, have attempted to interpret them by applying color. The cast at Cambridge interprets the incisions at her wrists as bracelets.

Her hair is arranged in Daedalic fashion, divided horizontally into six tresses at the back, ending in knobs, and similarly sculpted into four tresses placed on either side of the face in the front. The portion of hair between the back and side is also divided horizontally. A row of spiral curls forms her bangs. Her feet, which protrude from the bottom of her garment, are flat, the toes being parallel to each other and forming a continuous curve. Her flat, elongated fingers are also parallel to each other, the pinkie being almost as long as and the thumb being much smaller than the other fingers. Her preserved right eyebrow is prominently incised on her low forehead and her preserved right eye is carefully carved. The upper eyelid protrudes more than the lower one. Her lips are broad and do not meet at the corners of her mouth. Her chin is also very prominent and dished. Some scholars have interpreted the flatness of the lower body in comparison to the modeling of the face, torso, and arms as a result of the material and technique of the time, attributing this quality to the inexperience of the artist, forcing them to rely on geometric shapes to describe the form. However, this quality has also been considered intentional on the artist's part to fit into the aesthetic norms of the period and culture.

== See also ==
- Las Incantadas
- Minoan Bull-leaper
- La Parisienne (fresco)

== Sources ==
- Donahue, Alice A. (2005). Greek Sculpture and the Problem of Description New York, New York, USA: Cambridge University Press. pp. 131–135, 202. ISBN 0521840848.
- Harisson, Evelyn B. (1977). Notes on Daedalic Dress. The Journal of the Walters Art Gallery, Vol. 36. pp. 37–48.
- Martinez, Jean-Luc (2000). La Dame d'Auxerre Réunion des Musées Nationaux.
- Near, Richard (2012) Greek Art and Archaeology New York, New York, USA: Thames & Hudson. p. 113. ISBN 9780500288771.
- Richter, G. M. A. (1968). Korai: Archaic Greek Maidens New York, New York, USA:Phaidon Publishers INC. p. 32. SBN 71481328I.
