= Cisamus =

Town of ancient Crete

Coordinates: 35°29′43″N 23°39′39″E

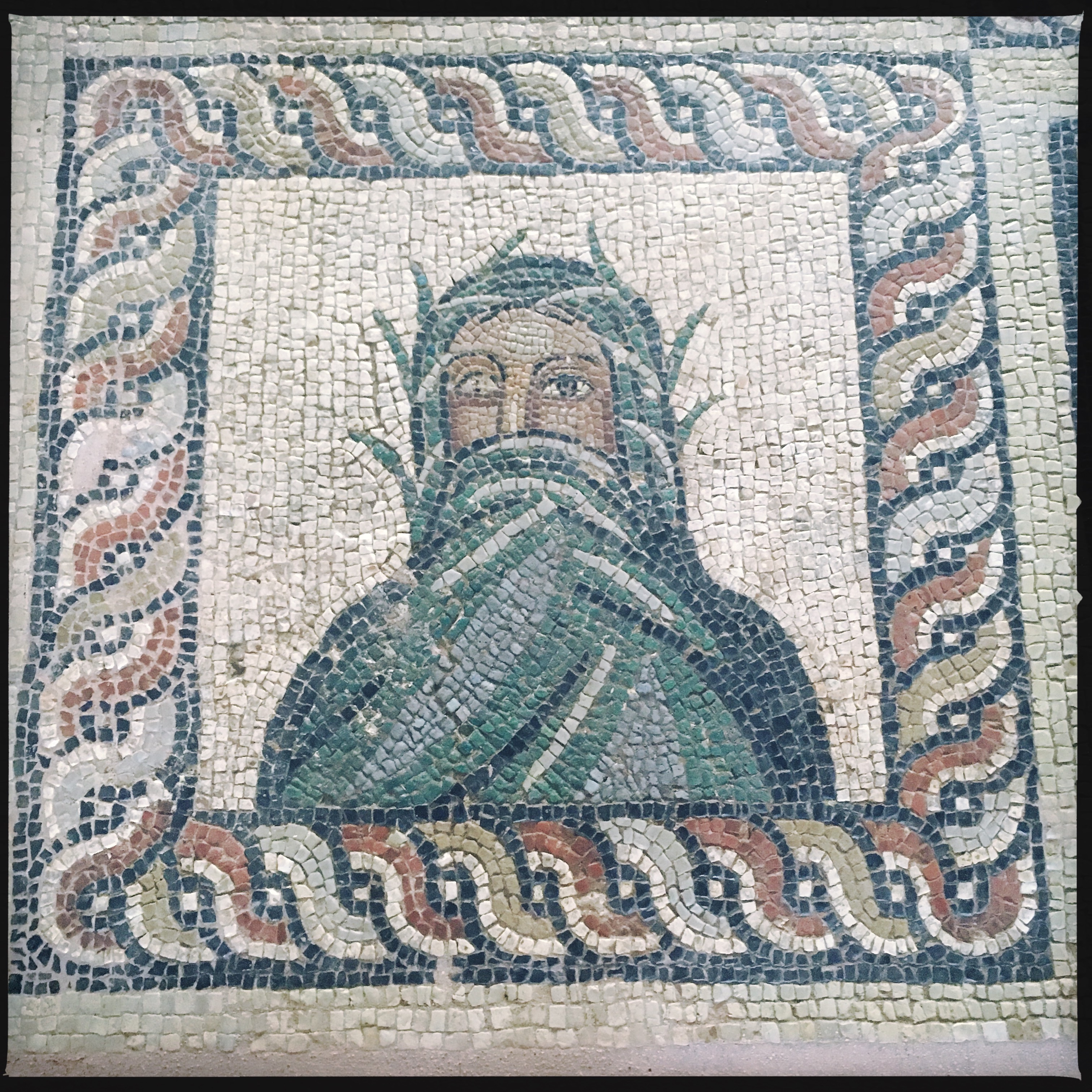
Detail of a Roman mosaic found at Cisamus

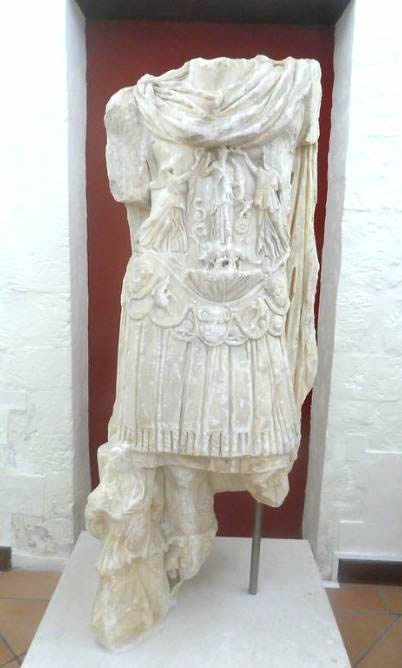
Statue of emperor Hadrian from Cisamus

Cisamus or Kisamos (Ancient Greek: Κίσαμος) was town of ancient Crete. It appears as one of two towns of the name in the Peutinger Table 32 M.P. to the west of Cydonia. The name appears as Cisamum in Pliny the Elder. Its site is located under modern Kastelli-Kissamou, where travelers in the 19th century observed 14 or 15 fragments of shafts of marble and granite columns, an Ionic capital, and remains of walls, indicating that there once existed upon this site a flourishing and important city.

The town was one of the two harbours of Polyrrhenia. The other harbour was Phalasarna. In 69–67 BC the latter city was destroyed by the Romans and Cisamus became the main port of Polyrrhenia. In the first century AD Polyrrhenia lost importance and it seems that many people from there moved to Cisamus. The town was enlarged on a street plan with grid patter. Its legal status is disputed. But on the Peutinger Table it is one of only four major cities mentioned on Crete.

There are only a few remains dating to the classical period (4th century BC) at Cisamus. The excavations show that the town was heavily expanded at the beginning of the Roman rule. Rescue excavations of the last decades brought to light substantial remains of the town. These remains include parts of cemeteries, several bath houses and many urban villas several of them well equipped with mosaics. There are remains of a temple and of a christian church. Several high quality statues were found in the town, many of them come from the area of the theatre, others from the bath houses but also from private houses. The town was heavily destroyed in the earthquake of 365.

The city had a theatre and an amphitheatre. The remains were still visible in the 16th century but were already gone in the 19th century.

There is evidence due to an inscription for a Jewish community in the town.
