= Lyttian War =

War in Crete, c. 220– c. 216 BC

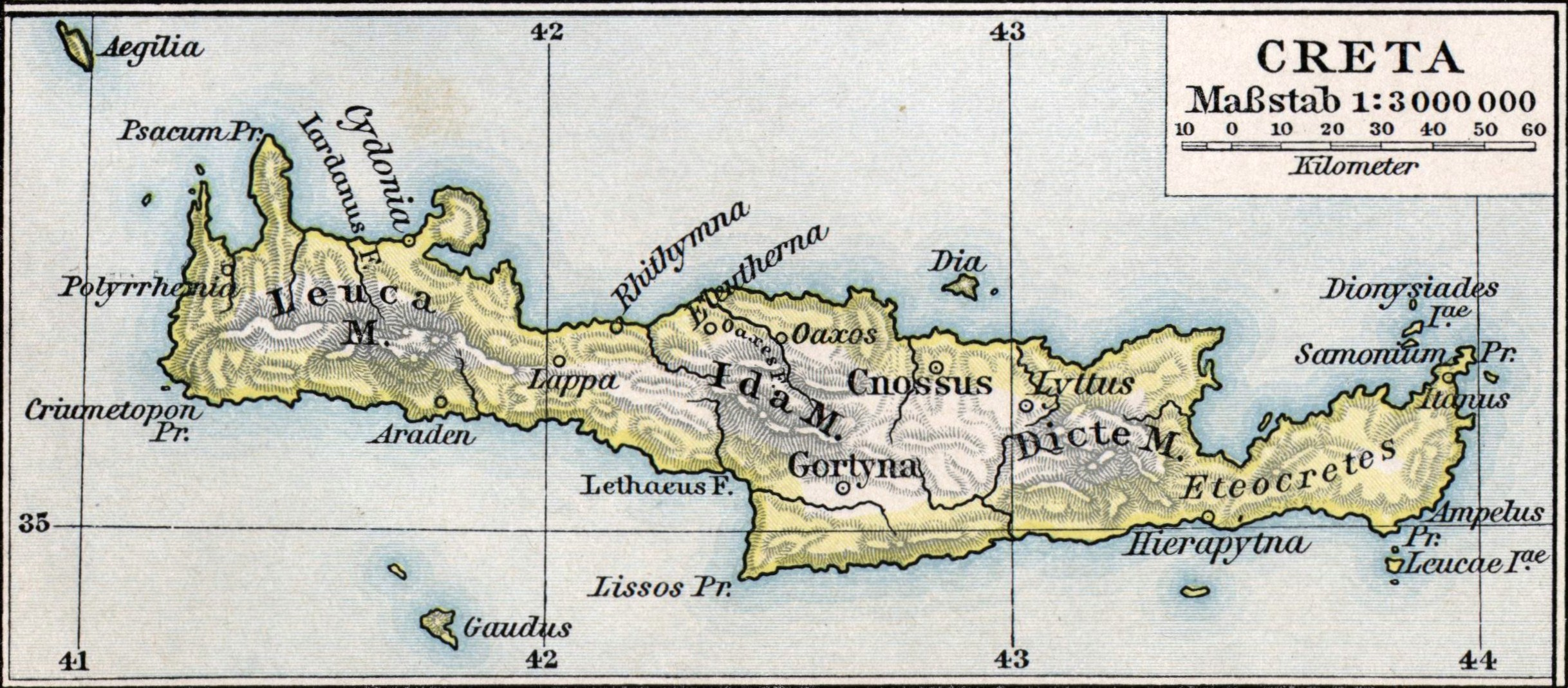
- Ancient Crete
Date	c. 220 BC – c. 216 BC
Location	Crete
Territorial changes	Knossian defeat, most of Crete comes under Macedonian influence

Belligerents
Knossos, Gortys, Kydonia, Rhodes, Aetolian League	Polyrrhenia, Lyttos, Lappa, Macedonia, Achaean League

Commanders and leaders
	Philopoemen; Philip V of Macedon; Plator of Illyria

Strength
Unknown Cretan forces, 1,000 Aetolians, 6 Rhodian ships	Unknown Cretan forces, 400 Illyrians, 200 Achaeans, 100 Phocians

The Lyttian War was an internal conflict fought from around 220 BC to about 216 BC between two coalitions of Cretan city-states, led by Knossos and Polyrrhenia respectively.

The events of the war are recorded by the historian Polybius. It is considered "the greatest war in Cretan history" during Antiquity.

== Prelude ==
The prelude to the conflict in Crete was the commercial war between the cities of Rhodes and Byzantium about the toll introduced by the Byzantines for all ships passing through the Bosporus on their way to the Pontus Euxinus. Posing a huge threat to Hellenistic trade, the conflict was ended in 220 BC with a compromise.

== Outbreak ==
Meanwhile, in Crete the allied cities of Knossos and Gortys had gained control of the whole island, except for the Spartan colony of Lyttos which alone resisted. When the Rhodian navarch Polemocles returned from the war against Byzantium, the Knossians thought that he could be helpful to their efforts against Lyttos. So they asked the Rhodians for assistance and Polemocles arrived with three decked and three undecked ships.

Soon after his arrival, however, the people of Eleutherna accused him of assassinating a citizen, Timarchus, and, in response, they declared war on the Rhodians.

Meanwhile, the Knossians and their allies had moved against Lyttos, but then, for some unknown reason, the alliance broke up and the Cretans began to quarrel with each other. Thus, the cities of Polyrrhenia and Lappa, along with some other communities, defected from the Knossians and allied with the Lyttians.

== Civil War ==
In Gortys the citizens were divided on the question of alliance and a civil war broke out in the city. The elder Gortynians remained loyal to Knossos, while the younger Gortynians favoured the Lyttians.

== Aetolian intervention ==
Taken by surprise by the sudden reverse, the Knossians asked the Aetolian League for help. The Aetolians were already present in Kydonia and sent 1000 warriors as assistance.

After the arrival of the Aetolians, the elders in Gortys led the Knossians and the Aetolians to occupy their citadel and proceeded to kill or expel their younger opponents. The young Gortynians took refuge in the ancient castle of Phaistos overlooking the bay south to Mount Ida.

Later, the young Gortynians in Phaistos launched a bold attack against the port of Gortys which they occupied, and they then besieged their opponents in the citadel of Gortys.

== Destruction of Lyttos ==
While the Knossians were occupied at Gortys, most of the Lyttian warriors left their city to invade the enemy territory. The Knossians, however, got intelligence of their plan and took the opportunity to invade the undefended city of Lyttos, capturing all the women and children and razing the city to the ground. When the Lyttians returned from their expedition, they decided to abandon their devastated homes and settled in Lappa whose citizens were willing to host them.

== Achaean intervention ==
Meanwhile, tensions on the mainland had risen between the Achaean League and the Aetolian League. As a result, in 220 BC the Social War broke out, which was to involve the Macedonian king Philip V of Macedon as he was a key ally of the Achaeans.

The Polyrrhenians then used the Aetolian interference in Crete as justification for asking Philip and the Achaeans for assistance against their common enemy. The Achaeans and Macedonians accepted them as allies and sent a mercenary force led by Plator to the island, consisting of 400 Illyrians, 200 Achaeans and 100 Phocians.

With these reinforcements, the Polyrrhenians made great progress moving against Eleutherna, Kydonia and Aptera. They quickly forced these cities to abandon their Knossian allies and enter the opposition coalition.

Thus the Knossians, in a short time, not only lost most of their allies, but also their hegemony over the island. Nevertheless, they were still able to assist the Aetolian allies with 1000 archers in their war on the Greek mainland. The Polyrrhenians on the opposite side did the same by sending 500 Cretans to support Philip V.

== Outcome ==
The war continued for several years, but the further narration by Polybius is lost. Generally, the war went favourably for the enemies of Knossos. Thus the Aetolians were expelled from the island and by 216 BC Crete was more or less a Macedonian protectorate. Two years later the Achaean strategos Aratus of Sicyon confirmed this outcome claiming that Philip V of Macedon enjoyed the faith of the Cretans and his ships ruled the Cretan Sea, while most of the island's strongholds obeyed his command.

Among the mercenary leaders fighting on the island was a young Arcadian named Philopoemen, who acquired great fame and experience which would serve him well in his later years as strategos of the Achaean League.

As a side effect of the conflict, Cretan mercenaries (the famed archers and the so-called Neocretans) are recorded all over the Hellenistic world, although none of the leaders (Cnopias of Allaria, Philon the Knossian, Eurylochus of Crete, Zelys the Gortynian at Raphia 217 BC; Lagoras, Kambylos and Bolis at the siege of Sardis 215/13 BC) can be traced directly to the civil war.

The Lyttians eventually returned to their homes and rebuilt their city on a nearby hill.

The conflict over Crete was renewed in 205 BC, when Philip V of Macedon used the island as a base for naval raids against the Rhodians. In the Cretan War (205–200 BC), Philip's major allies in Crete were the cities of Hierapytna and Olous. Toward the end, when the Romans entered the coalition against Macedon, the Knossians sided again with the Rhodians and forced Hierapytna to surrender. As a result, the Rhodians took control over eastern Crete which allowed them to largely stamp out piracy in the area. Following the Second Macedonian War, in 197 BC, Philip V lost all former allies and all possessions outside Macedonia proper.

== Sources ==
- Polybius, The Histories, IV 53–55
- Chaniotis, Angelos (2005). War in the Hellenistic World : a Social and Cultural History. Blackwell Publishing. ISBN 0631226087.
- Chaniotis, Angelos (2004). Mobility of persons during the Hellenistic Wars : State control and personal relations
- Florence Gaignerot-Driessen, The 'killing' of a city: a destruction by enforced abandonment, in: Jan Driessen (ed.), Destruction: Archaeological, Philological and Historical Perspectives, Presses universitaires, Louvain, 2013
- Teocharis Detorakis, History of Crete, Heraklion, 1994
