= Panormos (Crete) =

Coordinates: 35°25′08″N 24°40′58″E

Panormus or Panormos (Ancient Greek: Πάνορμος), also known as Aulopotamos (Αὐλοπόταμος), was a harbour of ancient Crete.

Its site is located near the modern Kastelli Mylopotamou/Panormos.
