= List of settlements in the Rethymno regional unit =

This is a list of settlements in the Rethymno regional unit, Greece.

- Achlades
- Adele
- Agia Foteini
- Agia Galini
- Agia Paraskevi
- Agia
- Agios Ioannis, Agios Vasileios
- Agios Ioannis, Amari
- Agios Ioannis, Mylopotamos
- Agios Konstantinos
- Agios Mamas
- Agios Vasileios
- Agkouseliana
- Aimonas
- Akoumia
- Aktounta
- Alfa
- Aloides
- Amari
- Amnatos
- Angeliana
- Ano Meros
- Ano Valsamonero
- Anogeia
- Apladiana
- Apodoulou
- Archaia Eleftherna
- Archontiki
- Ardaktos
- Argyroupoli
- Armenoi
- Asomatos
- Atsipopoulo
- Axos
- Chamalevri
- Charkia
- Chonos
- Choumeri
- Chromonastiri
- Damavolos
- Doxaro
- Drimiskos
- Eleftherna
- Elenes
- Episkopi, Mylopotamos
- Episkopi, Rethymno
- Erfoi
- Fourfouras
- Frantzeskiana Metochia
- Garazo
- Gerakari
- Gerani
- Gonia
- Goulediana
- Kalandare
- Kalogeros
- Kalonyktis
- Kalyvos
- Kare
- Karines
- Karoti
- Kastellos
- Kato Poros
- Kato Valsamonero
- Kentrochori
- Kerames
- Kissos
- Koufi
- Koumoi
- Kouroutes
- Koxare
- Krya Vrysi
- Kryoneri
- Kyrianna
- Lampini
- Lampiotes
- Lefkogeia
- Livadia
- Lochria
- Malaki
- Margarites
- Mariou
- Maroulas
- Melampes
- Melidoni
- Melissourgaki
- Meronas
- Mesi
- Monastiraki
- Mountros
- Mourne
- Myriokefala
- Myrthios
- Myxorrouma
- Nithavri
- Orne
- Oros
- Orthes
- Pagkalochori
- Panormo
- Pantanassa
- Pasalites
- Patsos
- Perama
- Petrochori
- Pigi
- Plakias
- Platania
- Platanos
- Prasies
- Prines
- Prinos
- Rethymno
- Rodakino
- Roumeli
- Roussospiti
- Roustika
- Saitoures
- Saktouria
- Selli
- Sellia
- Sises
- Skepasti
- Skouloufia
- Spili
- Theodora
- Thronos
- Veni
- Vilandredo
- Vistagi
- Vizari
- Voleones
- Vryses
- Zoniana
- Zouridi

== By municipality ==
Anogeia (no subdivisions)

== See also ==
- List of towns and villages in Greece
- Rethymno (municipality)
