= Agia Triada, Rethymno =

Agia Triada Αγία Τριάδα
- Settlement
- Location within Greece
- Coordinates: 35°21′35″N 24°34′18″E
- Country: Greece
- Administrative region: Crete
- Regional unit: Rethymno
- Municipality: Rethymno
- Municipal unit: Arkadi
- Community: Mesi

Population (51)
  - Total: 280
- Time zone: UTC+2 (EET)
  - Summer (DST): UTC+3 (EEST)

Agia Triada (officially: Agia Trias) is a settlement of the Community of Mesi in the Municipality of Rethymno in the Regional Unit of Rethymno, Crete. According to the 2011 census it has 62 inhabitants. It is located 11 km east of Rethymnon, at an altitude of 200 meters.

== Historical evidence ==
The village is mentioned by Francesco Barozzi in 1577 as S(an)ta Trinità. In the Venetian census of 1583 by Kastrophylakas it is mentioned as S. Trinita with 145 inhabitants and Francesco Basilicata in 1630 as S. Trinita. It is not mentioned in the census of 1881. In the census of 1900 it belonged to the municipality of Pigi and had 24 inhabitants. In 1925, Agia Triada belonged to the community of Mesi, in the District of Rethymno, and with the Kapodistrian administrative division, it belonged to the municipal division of Mesi of the Municipality of Arkadi.

=== Demography ===
In detail, the demographic progress of the village according to the censuses:

Census	Population
1900	24
1920	
1928	93
1940	104
1951	106
1961	79
1971	60
1981	55
1991	
2001	37
2011	62

== Sights ==
In the central square of the settlement is the Renaissance two-aisled church of Holy Trinity and St. Nikolaos. The village got its name from this church. Ecclesiastically, it is served by the parish of Mesi, which belongs to the 3rd Archpriestial Region of the Holy Metropolis of Rethymno and Avlopotamos. The village is surrounded by olive trees and numerous olive mills are preserved. Among the buildings of the village that have been preserved is the house of the great landowner Aga Albanis.
