= Agia Paraskevi, Rethymno =

Agia Paraskevi Αγία Παρασκευή
- Settlement
- Location within Greece
- Coordinates: 35°21′10″N 24°33′39″E
- Country: Greece
- Administrative region: Crete
- Regional unit: Rethymno
- Municipality: Rethymno
- Municipal unit: Arkadi
- Community: Adele

Population (2021)
  - Total: 280
- Time zone: UTC+2 (EET)
  - Summer (DST): UTC+3 (EEST)

Agia Paraskevi is a settlement in the Rethymno municipality in Crete.

== Geographical data ==
Agia Paraskevi is a lowland settlement located very close to Adele and at an average altitude of 120 meters. It is about 9.5 km east of Rethymno.

=== Sights ===
- The church of Agios Kosmas and Damianos, in the northern part of the settlement.
- The church of Agia Paraskevi, in a wooded ravine, on the site of an older Byzantine church that pre-existed there and was destroyed. The remains of the older building still exist and have been incorporated into the new one, such as small parts of the Byzantine hagiographies with which the original church was decorated. The existence of these hagiographies helps in the dating of the first temple, probably before the 17th century.
- The small gorge of the settlement.

== Population ==
Historical population
| Year | Pop. | ±% |
|---|---|---|
| 1991 | 161 | — |
| 2001 | 180 | +11.8% |
| 2011 | 246 | +36.7% |
| 2021 | 280 | +13.8% |

== Administrative changes up to "Kallikratis" ==
The settlement was annexed to the community of Adele from 1925 with the Government Gazette 27A - 31/01/1925

- With Government Gazette 244A - 04/12/1997 the settlement was detached from the community of Adele and annexed to the municipality of Arkadi
- With Government Gazette 87A - 07/06/2010 the settlement was detached from the municipality of Arkadi and annexed to the municipality of Rethymno

== Sources ==
- Encyclopædia Britannica, 1978, 2006
- Encyclopædia Britannica, εκδ. 1963 (ΠΛ)
- Encyclopedia "Domi", 2002–4
- Organization of publications «Ellada», maps (Varelas)
- Magazine "Diakopes", εκδ. Δ.Ο.Λ., 2010
