= Akoumia =

Akoumia Ακούμια
- Community
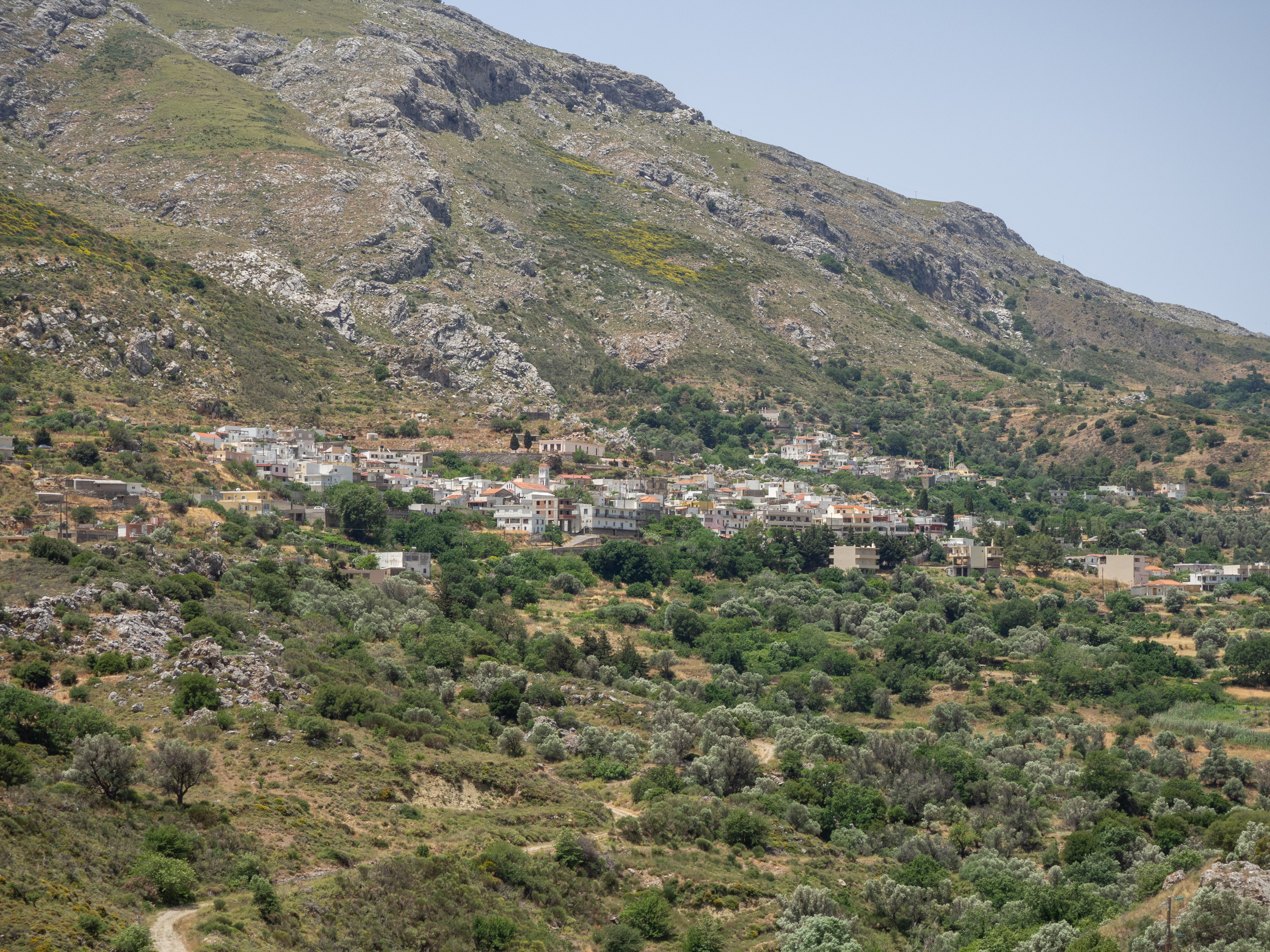

- Location within Greece
- Coordinates: 35°10′N 24°35′E
- Country: Greece
- Administrative region: Crete
- Regional unit: Rethymno
- Municipality: Agios Vasileios
- Municipal unit: Lampi

Population (2021)
  - Community: 472
- Time zone: UTC+2 (EET)
  - Summer (DST): UTC+3 (EEST)

Akoumia is a traditional Cretan village of about 450 people in the southern part of the Rethymno regional unit, famous for the two Triopetra (meaning three stones) beaches. It is part of the municipality Agios Vasileios.
