= Prines, Rethymno =

Place in Crete, Greece

Prines Πρινές
- Community
- Location within Greece
- Coordinates: 35°20′42″N 24°25′30″E
- Country: Greece
- Administrative region: Crete
- Regional unit: Rethymno
- Municipality: Rethymno
- Municipal unit: Nikiforos Fokas

Population (2021)
  - Community: 937
- Time zone: UTC+2 (EET)
  - Summer (DST): UTC+3 (EEST)

Prines (Greek: Πρινές) is a local community of the municipality of Rethymno within Rethymno regional unit, Crete, Greece. Before the "Kallikratis Project" it belonged to the municipality of Nikiforos Fokas (Νικηφόρος Φωκάς).

It lies 5 km W-SW of the town of Rethymno and consists of the village Prines, with 895 inhabitants and the settlement Vederoi with 42 inhabitants (2021 census). Together, the two settlements have been classified as "preservable traditional settlements" thus retaining their traditional style and character.

Before 1932 Prines was the seat of a community consisting of the villages Prines, Vederoi and Gerani. The community of Prines, then consisting of Prines and Vederoi, was absorbed into the new municipality Nikiforos Fokas in 1997.

Prines used to be an important place during the Venetian occupation of Crete (1204-1669 AD). According to local traditions, its name derives either from a Venetian lord (that the locals used to call "Prince") who lived there or after a very common bush called "Prinos" or "Prinari" that flourishes in the area. The village church, dedicated to St. Nikolaos, dates from the 13th century.

The majority of the local products are related to agriculture (mainly olives and olive-oil) and stock-breeding but there are also some small factories which employ a number of the inhabitants.
