= Roussospiti =

Roussospiti Ρουσσοσπίτι
- Community
- Location within Greece
- Coordinates: 35°20′N 24°29′E
- Country: Greece
- Administrative region: Crete
- Regional unit: Rethymno
- Municipality: Rethymno
- Municipal unit: Rethymno

Area
  - Community: 6.840 km^{2} (2.641 sq mi)

Population (2021)
  - Community: 536
  - Density: 78.4/km^{2} (203/sq mi)
- Time zone: UTC+2 (EET)
  - Summer (DST): UTC+3 (EEST)
- Postal code: 74100
- Area code: 28310
- Vehicle registration: ΡΕ

Roussospiti is a local community of the Rethymno Municipality in the Rethymno (regional unit) of the region of Crete established by Kallikratis reform. Previously, it was part of the former municipality of Rethymno. It is a traditional settlement and is classified in Class II, that is of average cultural value (Government Gazette 728/21-9-1995).

== Geography, origin of name, history ==
It is located 9 km southeast of Rethymno at an altitude of 300 meters, built in the 12th century by Venetians, as evidenced by the Venetian buildings in the village (arches, gates, fountain). At that time, a house ("spiti", in Greek) was built in the village, and this was called "Russo", i.e. red (russo+spiti=red house), and the village took its name after that. Others say that a Russian (Roussa) woman had built a house in the village, and that could be the origin of its name (the house of the Russian =roussospiti). 157 inhabitants were recorded in 1583. Later on, it was occupied by the Ottomans. The village lies on the slope of Vrisinas at an altitude of 300 meters. Apart from many Venetian houses, there is also a fountain of the 17th century and the church of Virgin Mary in this settlement. You can enjoy magnificent sea view (to the north)

Population of Roussospiti

1913	1920	1928	1940	1951	1961	1971	1981	1991	2001	2011	2021
372	400	358	358	353	272	195	174	257	374	569	536

== Attractions: Monuments, Temples, important buildings ==
The Virgin Mary is a small one-room church, like most churches of Crete. Built in the early 14th century. The Christ of the Crucifixion is one of the best preserved frescoes of the church and one of the most dynamic forms of Cretan art.

The Fountain of Roussospiti: It dates back to the 17th century. Gerola described it as "graceful", a characterisation, which, on a closer look, one must agree with. The spout has the shape of a lion's head.

Monastery of Aghia Irini (Saint Eirene), is situated near Roussospiti. This very old monastery is considered to date back to the 14th century. After restoration works were started in 1989, the monastery was given new life due to the eager activities of the nuns. There is an ecclesiastical museum in the Monastery area, called Holy Trinity Ecclesiastical Museum of Agia Irini.

== Miscellaneous ==
The village celebrates Agia Paraskevi's name day (26 July)

== See also ==
List of settlements in the Rethymno regional unit
