= Lefkogeia =

Lefkogeia Λευκόγεια
- Community
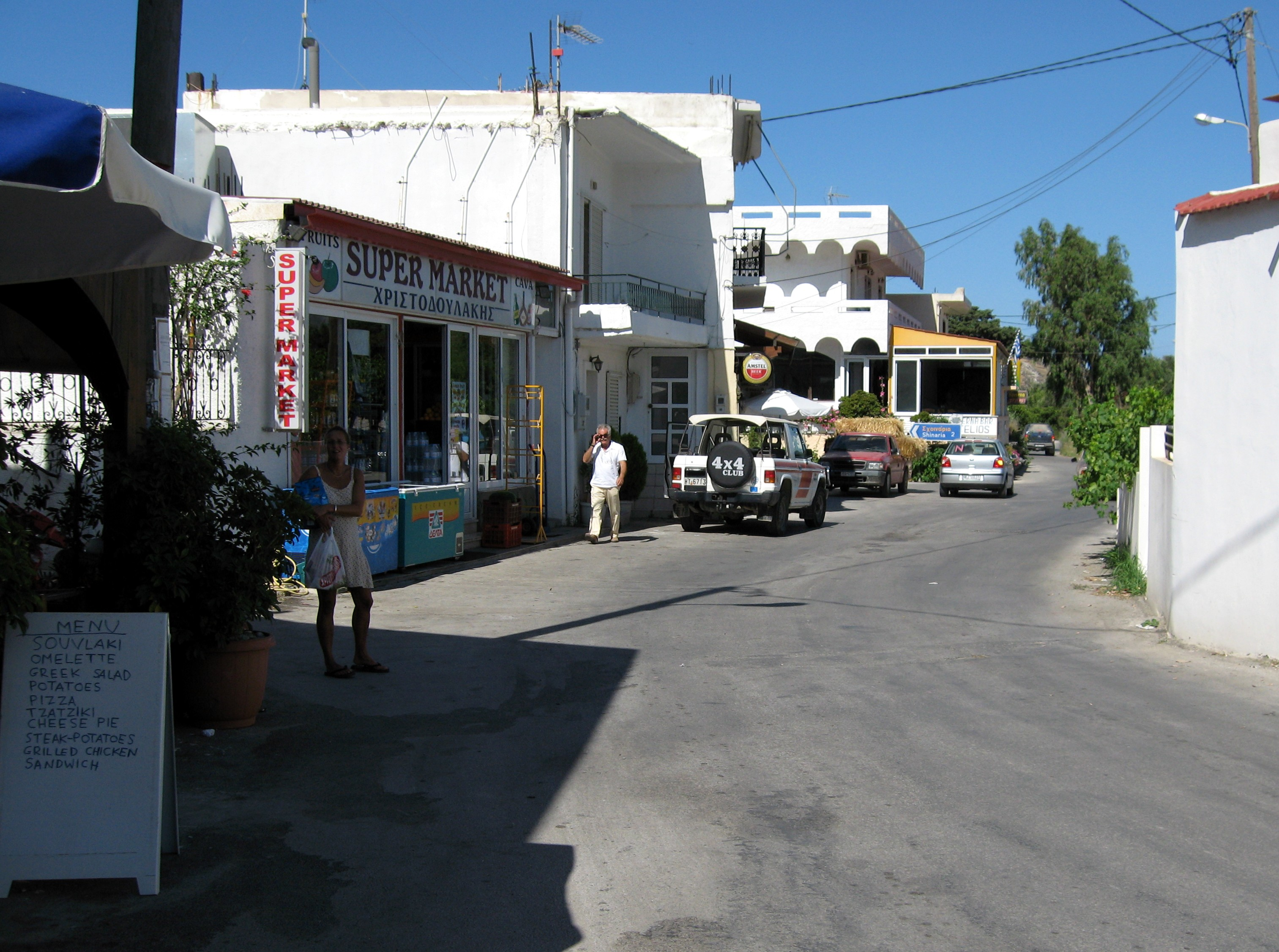

- Location within Greece
- Coordinates: 35°11′N 24°26′E
- Country: Greece
- Administrative region: Crete
- Regional unit: Rethymno
- Municipality: Agios Vasileios
- Municipal unit: Foinikas

Population (2021)
  - Community: 252
- Time zone: UTC+2 (EET)
  - Summer (DST): UTC+3 (EEST)

Lefkogeia (Greek: Λευκόγεια) is a village and a community in the municipal unit of Foinikas, Rethymno regional unit, Crete, Greece. The community has 252 inhabitants (2021).
