= Roustika =

Village in Crete, Greece

Roustika Ρούστικα
- Community
- Location within Greece
- Coordinates: 35°17′13″N 24°22′26″E
- Country: Greece
- Administrative region: Crete
- Regional unit: Rethymno
- Municipality: Rethymno
- Municipal unit: Nikiforos Fokas

Area
  - Community: 4.550 km^{2} (1.757 sq mi)

Population (2021)
  - Community: 172
  - Density: 37.8/km^{2} (97.9/sq mi)
- Time zone: UTC+2 (EET)
  - Summer (DST): UTC+3 (EEST)
- Postal code: 74055
- Area code: 28310
- Vehicle registration: ΡΕ

Roustika is a local community of the Rethymno Municipality in the Rethymno (regional unit) of the region of Crete established by Kallikratis reform. Previously, it was part of municipality of Nikiforos Fokas. Capital of the new municipality is Rethymnon. It is traditional settlement and is classified in Class II, that is of average cultural value (Government Gazette 728/21-9-1995). In 2005 Roustika was awarded as a "'clean and organized traditional community"'

== Geography, origin of name, history ==
Roustika is located twenty kilometers southwest of Rethymno at an altitude of 290 m at the foot of the hill Ambelos. Roustika existed before the conquest of Crete by the Venetians. The name could originate from the Arabic word Roustak (which means: village) and it is believed that the Venetians adapted the name to their language as Roustika. Others believe it originates from the Latin word rustic (=rural).

Population of Roustika

Name	1928	1940	1951	1961	1971	1981	1991	2001	2011	2021
Roustika	514	546	441	354	261	251	233	261	150	118
Palailimnos	105	122	90	91	93	73	76	104	53	54
Total	619	668	531	445	354	324	309	365	203	172

== Attractions: Temples, important buildings ==
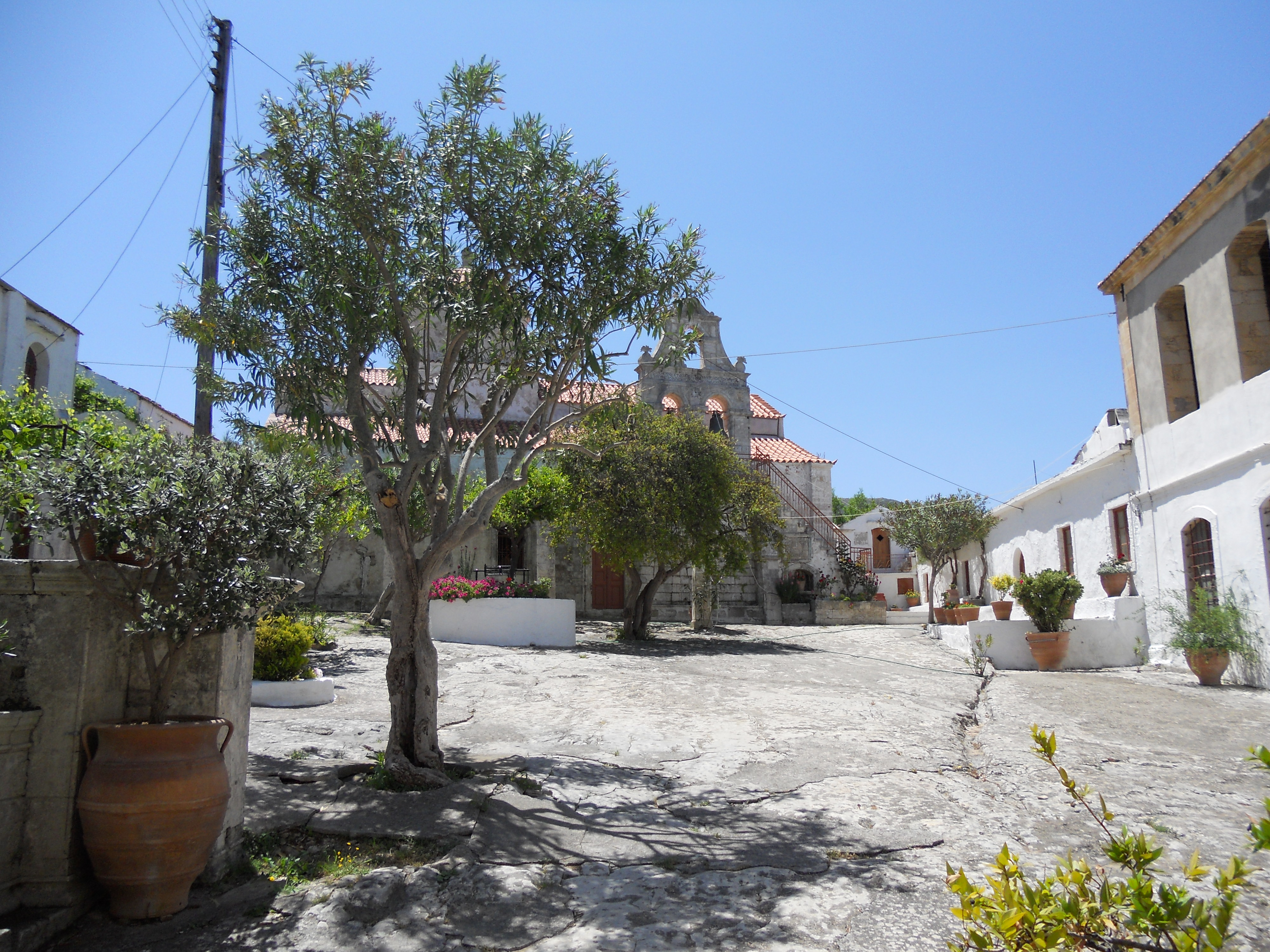
The Monastery of Prophet Elias

The monastery of Prophet Elias with the Byzantine church of Prophet Elias (Profitis Ilias), Agia Triada and Agia Zoni is a three-aisled basilica with a dome, has a bell tower with two bells and an inscription of 1637.

Panaghia Church (Church of the Assumption of the Virgin Mary): This two-aisled church dedicated to the Holy Virgin and Christ the Saviour is situated at the location called Livadi of Roustika. The walls in the interior of the church are covered with frescoes dating back to 1381. The belfry shows the inscription of the year 1627.

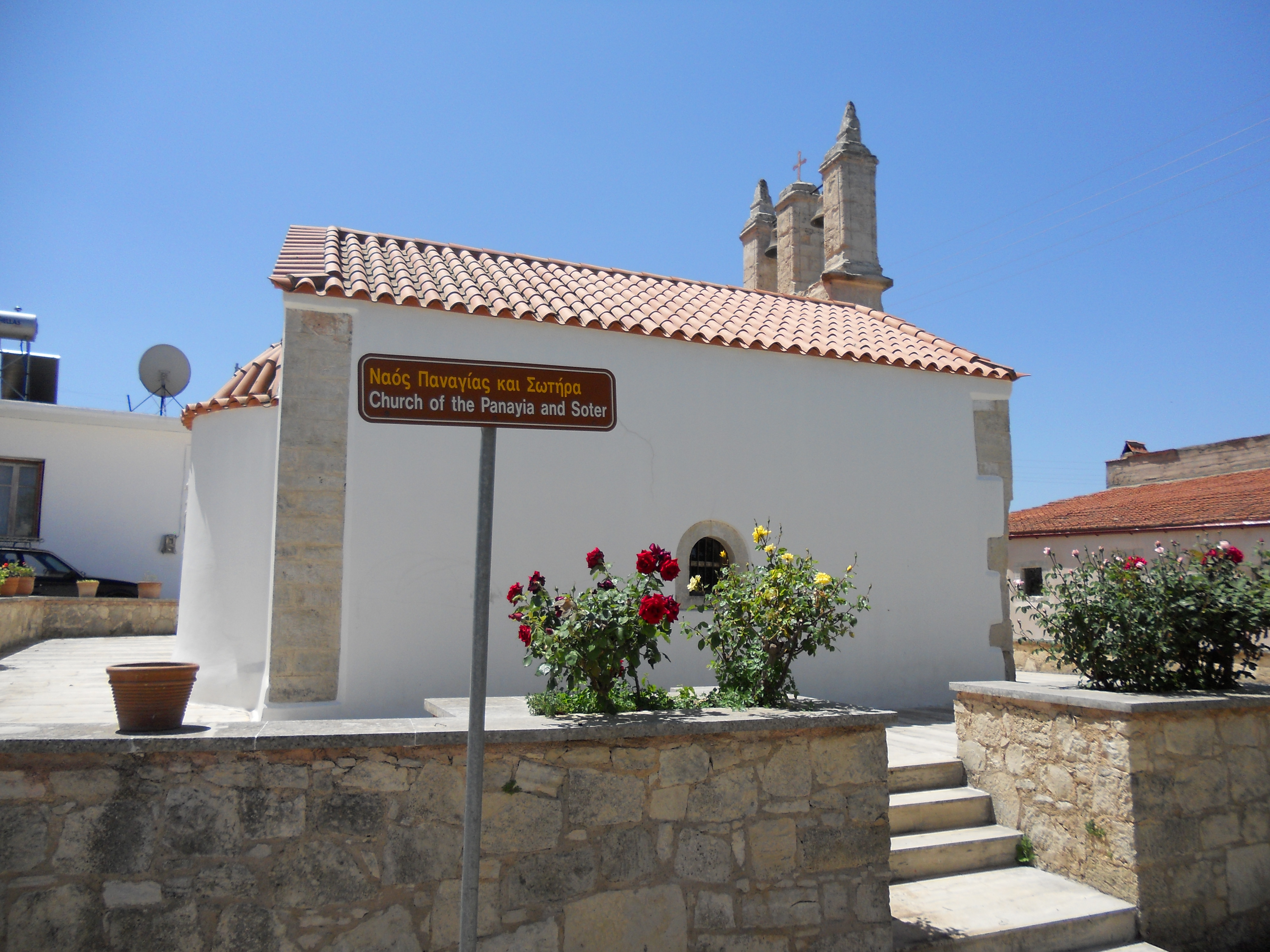
Panaghia and Soter Church

Spiritual - Cultural Center Anestis and Manolis Anagnostakis (private collection): Manolis Anagnostakis was a poet, one of the leading poets of the first postwar generation with origin from Roustika, the birthplace of his father. The Spiritual - cultural center Anestis and Manolis Anagnostakis is housed in the family home, which was donated to the community of Roustika by the poet himself.

The Museum of Traditional Greek costumes Kate & Andreas Fragkiadaki housed in ROUSTIKA MELATHRON

== Miscellaneous ==
There is a festival to celebrate the Prophet Elias (20 July).

There is public bus service (KTEL) from/to Rethymno (two services, morning and noon on weekdays and no services on weekends)

== See also ==
List of settlements in the Rethymno regional unit
