= Pigi, Rethymno =

Pigi Πηγή
- Community
- Location within Greece
- Coordinates: 35°21′N 24°34′E
- Country: Greece
- Administrative region: Crete
- Regional unit: Rethymno
- Municipality: Rethymno
- Municipal unit: Arkadi

Area
  - Community: 6.003 km^{2} (2.318 sq mi)

Population (2021)
  - Community: 951
  - Density: 158/km^{2} (410/sq mi)
- Time zone: UTC+2 (EET)
  - Summer (DST): UTC+3 (EEST)
- Postal code: 74100
- Area code: 28310
- Vehicle registration: ΡΕ

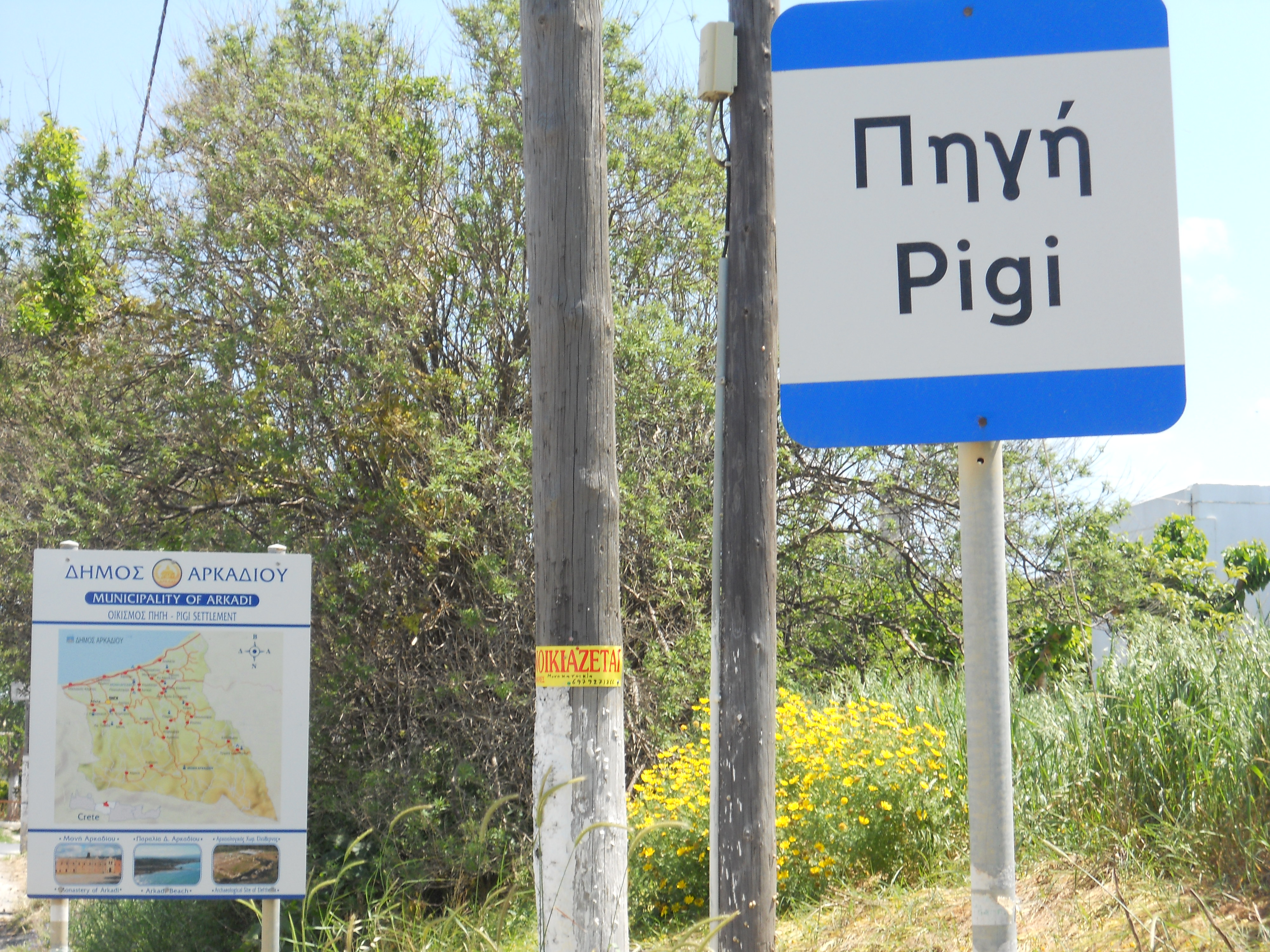
sign of Pigi and map of Arkadi municipality at the entrance of settlement of Pigi in Rethymno

Pigi is a local community of the Rethymno Municipality in the Rethymno regional unit of the region of Crete established by Kallikratis reform. Previously, it was part of the municipal district of Municipality of Arkadi. Capital of the new municipality is Rethymno.

== Geography and history ==
Pigi is located 9 km east of the city of Rethymno, on the road towards Arkadi, at an altitude of 60 meters, 1 km from Adele village. It is situated in the heart of a fertile and relatively smooth area, which in older times it was called Aryan. It is noteworthy that the English traveller Robert Pashley was the one who first wrote about the origin of the name of the village, 170 years ago. The relevant note is the two-volume book of this great traveller, printed in London in 1837. He says among other things: "In Pigi - the name comes from a rich source that supplies the village with excellent water." Pigi is being inhabited from the Venetian period onwards.

An airstrip that used to be near Pigi was a strategic target for the German forces during the Battle of Rethymno in World War II.

Population of Pigi

Settlement	1913	1920	1928	1940	1951	1961	1971	1981	1991	2001	2011	2021
Pigi	471	570	446	449	417	414	360	299	311	336	401	454
Agios Dimitrios	-	72	98	103	115	79	65	54	75	116	177	209
Pigianos Kampos	-	-	-	-	-	-	-	165	50	200	279	288
Total	471	642	544	552	532	493	425	518	436	652	857	951

== Attractions ==
There are many churches and chapels inside/close to the village: Agia Paravskevi Church, Virgin Mary, Agios Georgios of Koutroulis, Agios Georgios (church cemetery), Agios Ioannis and others. Agios Nikolaos church is decorated with frescoes of the 14th century, St George Church has frescoes bearing the date 1411.

== Transportation ==
There is bus service (KTEL) from/to Rethymno serving this area (services for Kyrianna and Loutra)

== See also ==
- List of settlements in the Rethymno regional unit
- Pigi Airport
