= Battle of the Corinth Canal =

1941 battle of the Balkans Campaign during World War II

- Part of the Balkans campaign during World War II
- Nazi Germany's attack on Greece
Date	26 April 1941
Location	Corinth Canal, Greece
Result	German victory

Belligerents
Axis; Germany	Allies; Greece; United Kingdom; Australia; New Zealand

Commanders and leaders
(Nazi Germany) Alfred Sturm (Nazi Germany) Hans Kroh	(United Kingdom) Edward Lillingston

Strength
Germany: 800 to 2,000 infantry.: Aircraft: Bf 110 – 80–100, Ju 88 – unknown, Ju 52 – 15, Ju 87 – 20–30, gliders – unknown.	Greece: 1,450 infantry. British Commonwealth: 900+ infantry; Tanks: four.

Casualties and losses
Germany: 63 killed; 158 wounded; 16 missing. Aircraft – one glider.	Allies: unknown number killed or wounded; Greece: 1,450 prisoners British Commonwealth: 921 prisoners. Four tanks.
- Many Allied personnel, approximately 10,000, were subsequently taken prisoner, while awaiting evacuation.

During the German invasion of Greece on 6 April 1941, the Allied forces were pushed back from Macedonia and Thessaly into mainland Greece while the British fleet stood by at various ports in the south of Greece to evacuate any remaining Allied troops from the advancing German ground and air units. A critical target during the German invasion, was the Corinth Canal which divided the Peloponnesus from the Greek mainland as Hitler saw it as the gateway to control the Aegean Sea and trap the evacuating Allied forces in Greece if it were captured and kept operational.

== Background ==
Greece entered the Second World War on the side of the Allies following an Italian invasion from Albania on 28 October 1940. Greece repulsed the initial Italian attack and a counter-attack in March 1941. Coming to the aid of its struggling ally, Nazi Germany launched an invasion of its own known as Operation Marita, which began on 6 April. While the bulk of the Greek Army was deployed on the Albanian front, German troops invaded from Bulgaria, creating a second front. The Greek army found itself outnumbered in its effort to defend against both Italian and German troops. As a result, the Metaxas defensive line did not receive adequate troop reinforcements and was quickly overrun by the Germans, who then outflanked the Greek forces at the Albanian front, forcing their surrender.

== Preparations ==
The German attack on the Corinth Canal was given the name Operation Hannibal (no primary source documentary evidence that this codename was used. It was referred to as Unternehmen Korinth) with the main target of the operation being the Corinth Canal Bridge. The German forces considered that if the bridge could be captured and held, the planned Allied evacuation to either Crete or Egypt would be delayed if not stopped entirely. The bridge itself however was held and defended by British and Australian troops, and had been wired for demolition in order to block the canal. The defenders were also equipped with eight 3.7-inch and eight 3-inch anti-aircraft guns along with 16 Bofors guns.

The attack plan would consist of German Fallschirmjäger assault engineers seizing both ends of the canal in a surprise glider assault while both battalions of the 2nd Fallschirmjäger Regiment were to parachute to the north and south of the bridge in order to neutralize any stationed Allied forces at the canal.

The air assault forces consisted of:

- 80–100 Bf 110's
- unknown number of Ju 88's
- 15 Ju 52's
- 20–30 Ju 87's
- 2nd Fallschirmjäger Regiment under command of Lt. Teussen
- 6th Company under command of Hauptmann Gerhart Schirmer
- 230 gliders under command of Lt. Wilhelm Fulda
- 52 Fallschirmpionere (paratrooper pioneers) under command of Lt. Häffer

German soldiers complement: 800

== The Battle ==
In the morning hours of 26 April 1941, the defending Allied forces at the Canal bridge were submitted to a surprise attack in the form of machine gun fire and a high altitude bombing of the Canal Zone from German dive bombers which were escorted by Messerschmitt Bf 110 heavy fighters. The attack's main objective was to eliminate all anti-aircraft weapons that were stationed near the canal in order to ensure the safety of the incoming attack force.

This attack force took off in gliders at 5 am along with five assault groups of three Ju-52s each following them in a "V" formation. They arrived at their destination at 7.25 am and aided by clear and bright skies, the gliders began their descent. Suddenly the gliders were under enemy fire as it seemed that two enemy anti-aircraft batteries had survived the earlier bombing and were still stationed along the southern end of the bridge. One of the gliders was hit and fell from a height of about 8 meters.

Despite the resistance of the British troops, a group of 54 paratrooper engineers managed to land near the canal and both battalions of the 2nd Fallschirmjäger Regiment reached their intended positions at the north and south ends of the bridge. Their arrival was immediately met with Allied machine gun and rifle fire as the German troops had landed several hundred meters away from the bridge in a valley, which forced them to take cover after freeing themselves from their parachute.

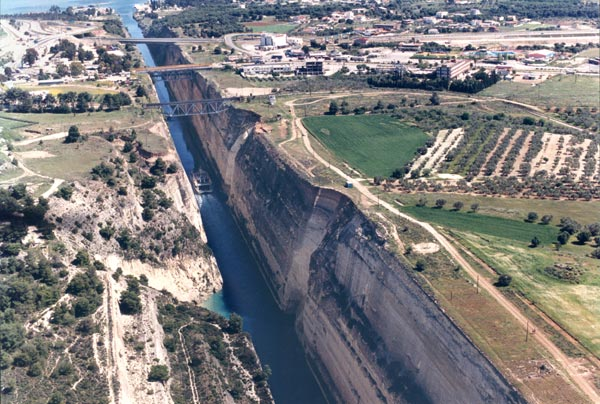
Canal of Corinth viewed from the air.

The paratroopers under the command of lieutenant Teussen stormed the two still functioning anti-aircraft batteries at the South end of the bridge, while the German engineers reached the North end of the bridge and began to remove the explosive charges. The assault on the bridge was over and North of the Isthmus of Corinth, the paratroopers managed to capture the field with the defending Allied forces being either killed or captured. By this time General Alfred Sturm ordered Hauptmann Gerhart Schirmer to pursue the enemy and conquer the nearby towns of Argos and Nauplia which were defended by British troops from the Isthmus Force consisting of 4th Hussars with three light tanks, a New Zealand company and the New Zealander cavalry squadron. They were no match against their attackers and the towns soon fell into German hands.

After their attack on the anti-aircraft batteries, Lieutenant Teussen’s Platoon used military vehicles which were left behind by the retreating British to capture the town of Corinth. Shortly after the paratroopers entered the town the civil and military authorities surrendered in order to ensure the well-being of the civilians. After capturing Corinth, Hauptmann Schirmer ordered Lieutenant Teussen to act as an advance guard and to press ahead with his platoon towards Nauplia. The Canal itself fell into German hands shortly after noon.

In the meantime, the German paratroopers had removed the Allied demolition charges and had piled all of them in the middle of the bridge in order to be disabled later. Suddenly an explosion rocked through the Canal as the bridge collapsed into it. A stray round set off the pile of charges and blew the center out of the bridge, dragging down the engineers and any paratroopers who were still on it. War reporter Sonderführer Ernest von der Heyden was also killed in the explosion, his camera was recovered afterwards from one of the Canal banks. The bridge's destruction allowed the Allies to escape without a German pursuit, but they were forced to abandon valuable equipment during their retreat. The British also sunk an 80 ton wooden lighter on the canal's western end.

Capt. John Tyson, a British combat engineer, and those with him in the British rear guard, placed explosives at key points under the bridge to destroy it. As they had six tons of explosives and no way of transporting them, they placed the explosives they did not need on the bridge. As the German troops began to occupy the bridge, Tyson, with his rifle, fired at the key explosives and blew up the bridge. He received the Military Cross for his actions. He was evacuated to Egypt.

== Aftermath ==
The battle ended up wounding 158 German soldiers with 63 being killed in action and 16 missing in action. Allied casualties remain unknown but the Germans claimed to have taken 921 British and Australian soldiers as well as 1,450 Greek soldiers alongside 12,000 other Allied troops as prisoners of war in just a few hours, despite the quick reaction time and fierce (albeit brief) fighting of the Allied forces. The operation however could not be deemed a complete success since the bridge had been demolished instead of just captured.

The blame for the destruction of the bridge is thought to lie with the inexperience of the German engineers, particularly their commanding officer. Considering that he had ordered to pile up all the explosive charges on the superstructure of the bridge instead of throwing them out of harms way which resulted in those charges blowing up when they were impacted by a stray round.

Italian and German military engineers began working on clearing the canal on 2 May. The first Italian supply convoy managed to pass through the canal on 16 May, arriving at Pireaus. The late arrival of fuel carried by the Italian convoys caused the airborne invasion of Crete to be postponed by two days to 20 May. The Germans prevailed after seven days of fighting, forcing an Allied withdrawal to Egypt. With the conclusion of Operation Marita, Greece was subjected to a Triple Occupation by Germany, Italy and Bulgaria.

Having secured the Corinth Canal, Italy and Germany began importing oil from their ally, the Kingdom of Romania by way of the Bosporus. Closing the canal to Axis shipping would force Axis ships to travel around the Peloponnese, thus exposing them to Royal Air Force bombers and Allied submarines based in Egypt and Malta. The German intervention into the North African campaign further increased the canal's importance as Pireaus became a major center of Axis logistics. Allied command estimated that 90% of German seaborne reinforcements to North Africa traveled through the canal. The canal subsequently became the target of numerous Allied sabotage operations.
