= Amnatos =

Amnatos Αμνάτος
- Community
- Location within Greece
- Coordinates: 35°20′N 24°37′E
- Country: Greece
- Administrative region: Crete
- Regional unit: Rethymno
- Municipality: Rethymno
- Municipal unit: Arkadi

Area
  - Community: 23.537 km^{2} (9.088 sq mi)

Population (2021)
  - Community: 191
  - Density: 8.11/km^{2} (21.0/sq mi)
- Time zone: UTC+2 (EET)
  - Summer (DST): UTC+3 (EEST)
- Postal code: 74100
- Area code: 28310
- Vehicle registration: ΡΕ

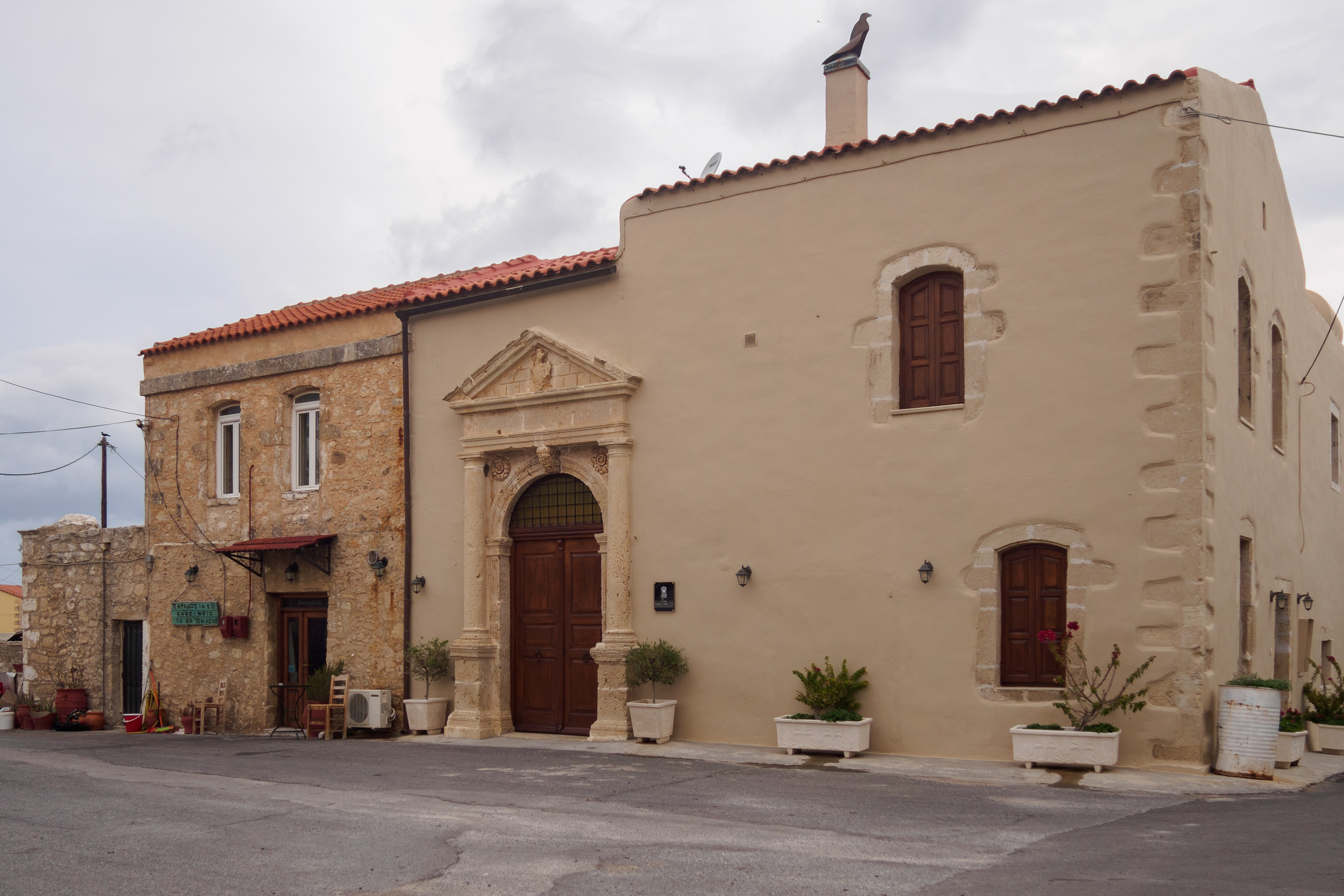
House in Amnatos, with the portal of Sanguinazzo mansion

Amnatos is a local community of the Rethymno Municipality in the Rethymno (regional unit) of the region of Crete established by Kallikratis reform. Previously, it was part of the municipal district of Municipality of Arkadi. Amnatos is a traditional settlement and is classified in Class II, that is of "average cultural value" (Government Gazette 728/21-9-1995). Buildings with Venetian architectural elements are scattered throughout the village. In 2005 Amnatos received an award of the "cleaner and organized traditional community".

== Geography ==
It is located on the northeastern edges of the Gargano mountain, 17 km (10.6 miles) southeast of Rethymno, on the way to Arkadi, at an altitude of 320 m. It has a view of the North Sea and the Cretan mountain Psiloreitis.

== Origin of name and history ==
The location of the village appears to have been inhabited since ancient times and it is believed that the name Amnatos has Minoan origin. Ancient Greeks used to call amnion all those vessels used at their time to collect the blood of sacrificed animals.

The area was occupied by the Venetians and the Ottomans.

Nowadays, the local community of Amnatos consists of four settlements: Amnatos, Kapsaliana (Καψαλιανά), Pikris (Πίκρης) and the Arkadi Monastery.

Population of Amnatos

Settlement	1940	1951	1961	1971	1981	1991	2001	2011	2021
Amnatos	372	328	276	213	193	196	147	156	134
Kapsaliana	58	31	27	16	12	4	2	1	7
Arkadi Monastery	40	60	32	23	18	13	9	6	3
Pikris	183	205	151	111	121	77	64	55	47
Total	653	624	486	363	344	290	222	218	191

== Attractions: monuments, temples, and important buildings ==
Among the many Venetian buildings in the village of Amnatos, there is a house with a particularly impressive doorframe. The crown of the gable has the inscription: "INITIUM SAPIENTE TIMOR DOMINI" (in English: "The Beginning of Wisdom is Fear of the Lord").

There is also a folk museum and a Municipal Museum of the History of Greek Education.

Amnatos is the home village of Harikleia Daskalaki, a heroine of the Arkadi holocaust. A statue of her is found in the square of the village.

== Transportation ==
There is bus service (KTEL) from and to Rethymnon in this area (route for Arkadi Monastery, which has three services on weekdays and two on weekends).
