= Alfred Sturm =

German general (1888–1962)

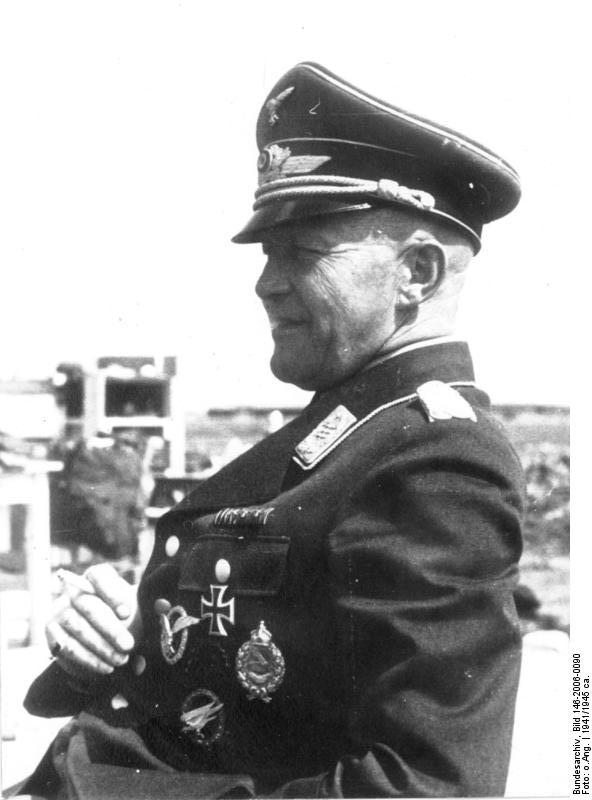
- Sturm in 1941
- Born: 23 August 1888
- Died: 8 March 1962 (aged 73)
- Military career
- Allegiance: German Empire; Nazi Germany
- Branch: Luftwaffe
- Rank: Generalleutnant
- Conflicts: Battle of Crete
- Awards: Knight's Cross of the Iron Cross

Alfred Sturm (23 August 1888 – 8 March 1962) was a German general during World War II.

During the Battle of Crete, Sturm (then an Oberst) was commander of the 2nd Parachute Rifle Regiment. On 20 May 1941, he jumped from an aircraft over Crete and landed west of the Pigi airfield, a key objective, near Rethymno (Retimo). Sturm was captured as a POW on 21 May 1941 by soldiers of the Greek 4th Infantry Regiment, and delivered to the headquarters of the Australian 2/11th Battalion for imprisonment. For 10 days Sturm was detained at a makeshift POW camp at Pigi village. At his insistence and in line with German military custom, the commissioned officer was kept separate from German enlisted personnel. Sturm was awarded the Knight's Cross of the Iron Cross for his actions at Crete.

== Promotions ==
- Vizefeldwebel (1 August 1913)
- Offiziers-Stellvertreter (1 January 1915)
- Leutnant (5 June 1919)
- Oberleutnant (15 January 1921)
- Hauptmann (1 March 1926)
- Major (21 April 1935)
- Oberstleutnant (2 August 1936)
- Oberst (1 October 1938)
- Generalmajor (1 August 1941)
- Generalleutnant (1 August 1943)

== Awards ==
- Iron Cross (1914) 2nd Class (18 June 1916) & 1st Class (17 January 1917)
- Clasp to the Iron Cross (1939) 2nd Class (28 October 1940) & 1st Class (25 June 1941)
- Knight's Cross of the Iron Cross on 9 July 1941 as Oberst and commander of Fallschirmjäger-Regiment 2

Military offices
Preceded by Generalleutnant Wilhelm Süssmann	Commander of 7. Flieger-Division; 20 May 1941 – 30 May 1942	Succeeded by Generalleutnant Erich Petersen
