= Èvangeliya Kladu =

Evangelia Kladou
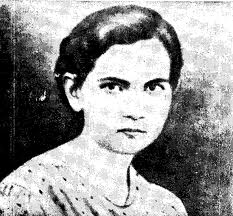
- Native name: Ευαγγελία Κλάδου
- Born: 1919; Anogeia, Crete, Greece
- Died: December 6, 1949 (aged 29–30)
- Allegiance: Communist Party of Greece; Democratic Army of Greece
- Conflicts: World War II; Greek resistance; Greek Civil War †

Evangelia Kladou was a Greek Partisan and a member of the Communist Party of Greece.

== Life Before World War II ==
Evangelia was born in 1919 in Anogia, a village near Anogeia, to a poor family of six children. Her father was a postal worker. She later attended the Arsakeio Pedagogical Academy In Athens and earned a teacher's degree and was appointed to teach in Myriokefala in 1940.

== World War II ==
After the Nazi takeover of Crete she helped Allied troops escape Crete. In 1942 she joined National Liberation Front but remained as a teacher until 1944 and joined the Greek People's Liberation Army.

== Greek Civil War and death ==
In March 1946 she was arrested after leading The pan-agrarian strike in Chania. After her arrest she joined the Democratic Army of Greece and became a captain in the organization. After Operation Pyrsos she retreated and hid in a cave with her unit but was killed in an ambush on by the Hellenic Army on December 6, 1949 she was then beheaded and her head carried around to local villages to send a warning to local villagers.
