= Maroulas =

Maroulas Μαρουλάς
- Community
- Location within Greece
- Coordinates: 35°20′N 24°33′E
- Country: Greece
- Administrative region: Crete
- Regional unit: Rethymno
- Municipality: Rethymno
- Municipal unit: Rethymno

Area
  - Community: 11.483 km^{2} (4.434 sq mi)

Population (2021)
  - Community: 533
  - Density: 46.4/km^{2} (120/sq mi)
- Time zone: UTC+2 (EET)
  - Summer (DST): UTC+3 (EEST)
- Postal code: 74100
- Area code: 28310
- Vehicle registration: ΡΕ

Maroulas (Greek: Μαρουλάς) is a local community of the Rethymno Municipality in the Rethymno (regional unit) of the region of Crete established by Kallikratis reform. It is traditional settlement and is classified in Class II, that is of average cultural value (Government Gazette 728/21-9-1995).

== Geography, origin of name, history ==
Maroulas lies southeast of Rethymno and 10 kilometers from this city at an altitude of 240 meters. Most buildings date back to the Venetian period, but the area is likely to be inhabited since the Minoan period. According to tradition, the village took its name from the shepherdess Maroula, who, while grazing her sheep in the region, found a spring of cool digestive water.

Population of Maroulas

Name	1940	1951	1961	1971	1981	1991	2001	2011	2021
Maroulas	472	374	312	221	184	188	192	486	277
Dilofo	-	-	-	-	-	-	26	61	256
Total	472	374	312	221	184	188	218	547	533

== Archaeological discoveries, buildings, temples ==
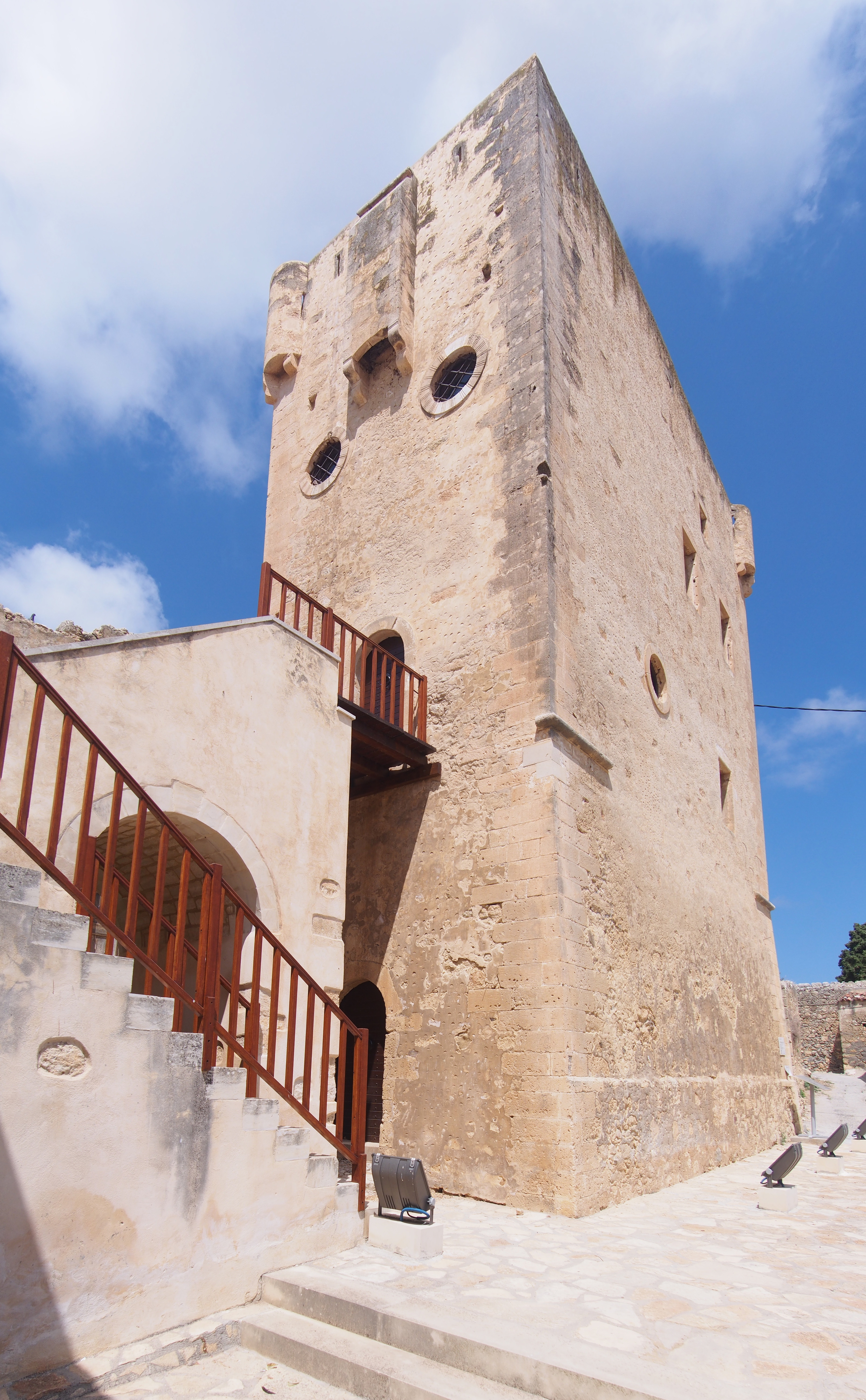
Tower I

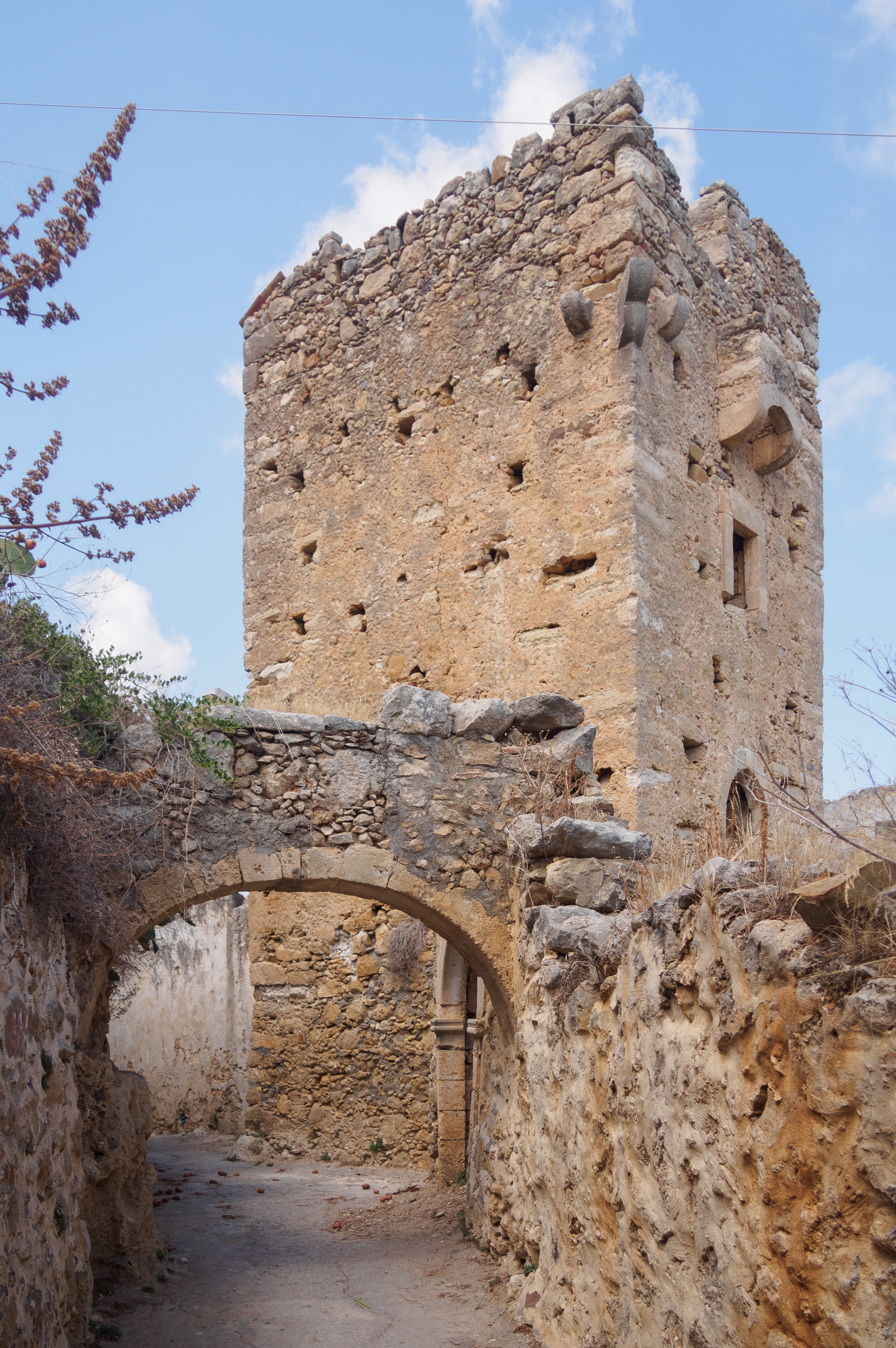
Tower II

The two towers of Maroulas.

Two cemeteries of the palatial period of Minoan period have been revealed in the area. The finds from the cemeteries are exhibited at the Archaeological Museum of Rethymno.

The Venetians built two towers, which are still preserved, and other buildings with battlements. There are several coats of arms on the doors of buildings. In 1630 Turks settled in Maroulas. Visitors can see a mill, large arched doors of the Venetian mansions, narrow streets, and arches.

The 'Temple of Prophet Elias', built at the top of the hill, has extensive views to the Cretan Sea.

== Miscellaneous ==
There is a public bus service (KTEL) from/to Rethymno (two services, morning and noon on weekdays and no services on weekends)

Since 21 July 2005 the area of Maroulas is included in the Cadastre system and is under the authority of the Cadastral Office of Rethymno (20 Hortatzis Str., ZIP: 74100, Rethymno, Phone n.: 0030-28310-22403)

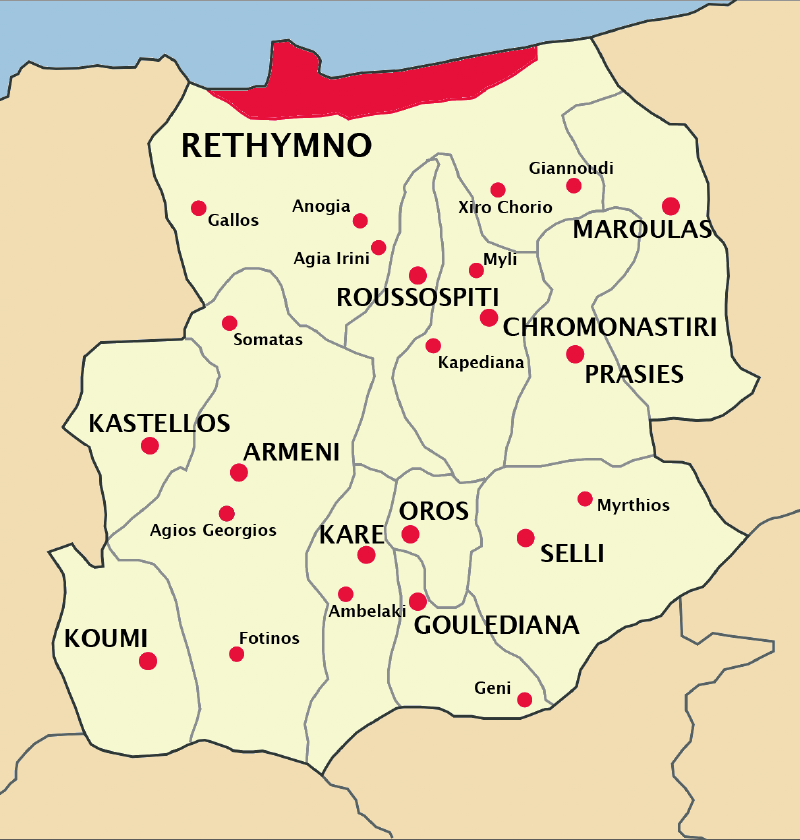
Rethymno (former) district

== See also ==
- List of settlements in the Rethymno regional unit
