= Petrochori =

Petrochori (Greek: Πετροχώρι) may refer to several places in Greece:

- Petrochori, Achaea, a village in Achaea
- Petrochori, Aetolia-Acarnania, a village in the municipal unit Thermo, Aetolia-Acarnania
- Petrochori, Karditsa, a village in the municipal unit Athamanes, Karditsa regional unit
- Petrochori, a village in the community Romanos, Messenia
- Petrochori, Rethymno, a village in the municipal unit Kourites, Rethymno regional unit
- Petrochori, Trikala, a village in the municipal unit Pyli, Trikala regional unit
- Petrochori, a village in the community Evmoiro, Xanthi regional unit
