= Myriokefala =

Myriokefala Μυριοκέφαλα
- Community
- Location within Greece
- Coordinates: 35°15′N 24°19′E
- Country: Greece
- Administrative region: Crete
- Regional unit: Rethymno
- Municipality: Rethymno
- Municipal unit: Lappa

Area
  - Community: 13.226 km^{2} (5.107 sq mi)

Population (2021)
  - Community: 268
  - Density: 20.3/km^{2} (52.5/sq mi)
- Time zone: UTC+2 (EET)
  - Summer (DST): UTC+3 (EEST)
- Postal code: 74100
- Area code: 28310
- Vehicle registration: ΡΕ

Myriokefala is a local community of the Rethymno Municipality in the Rethymno (regional unit) of the region of Crete established by Kallikratis reform. Previously, it was part of municipality of Lappa. Capital of the new municipality is Rethymno.

== Geography, origin of name, history ==
It is located 33 kilometers southwest of Rethymno, on the northwestern outskirts of the Kryoneritis mountain (height 1228 m) in an altitude of 500 meters with great view to the valley of Asi Gonia. Its name is due to the myriad (many) heads, i.e. hills, on which the village was built. Myriokefala is being occupied since the Venetian period.

Population of Myriokefala

Name	1913	1920	1928	1940	1951	1961	1971	1981	1991	2001	2011	2021
Myriokefala	315	267	251	297	325	324	285	266	281	402	268	227
Maroulou	-	113	91	88	86	69	63	76	59	55	41	41
Total	315	380	342	385	411	393	348	342	340	457	309	268

== Attractions: Monuments, Temples, important buildings ==
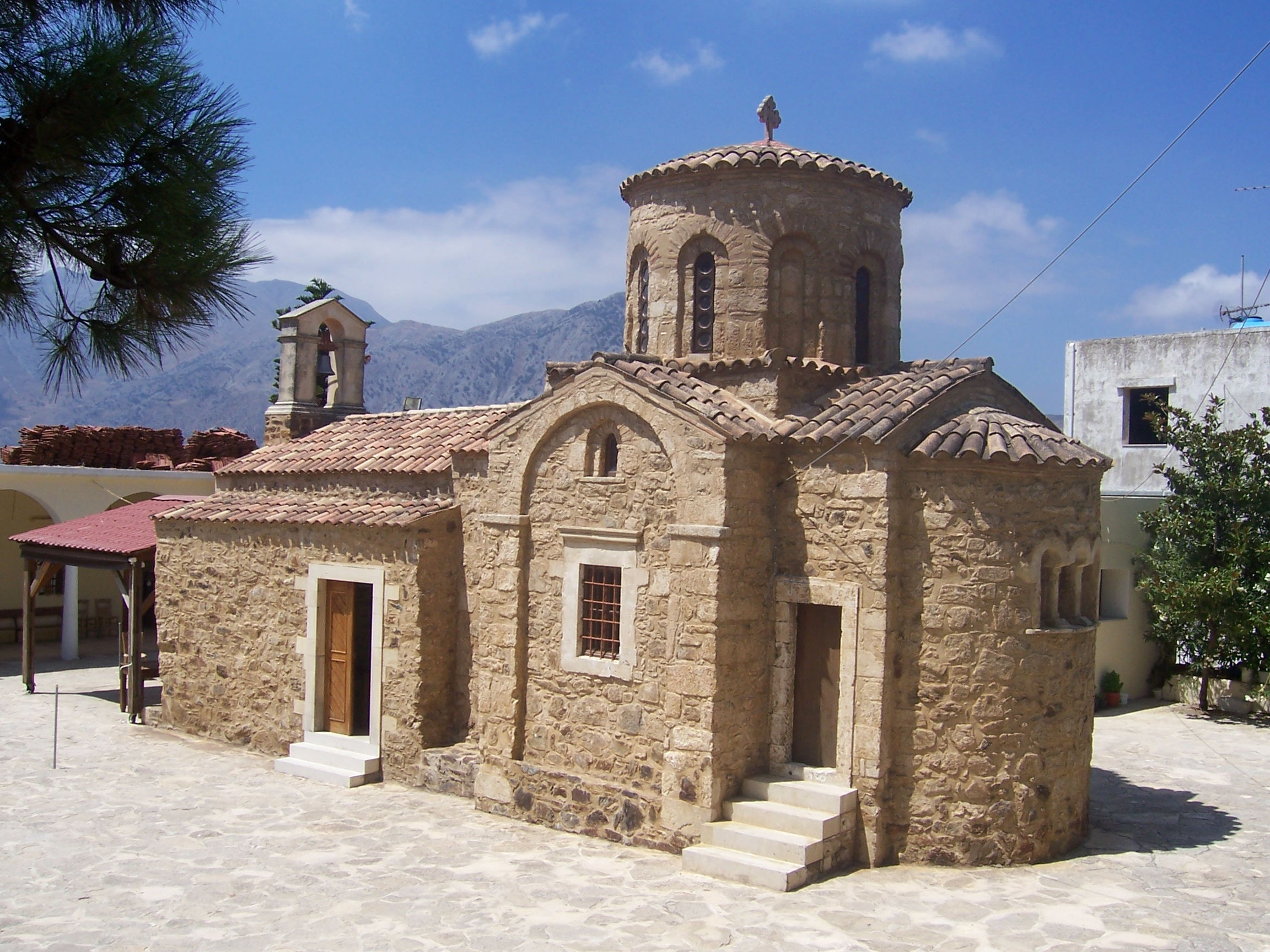
The Church of Virgin Mary at Myriokefala

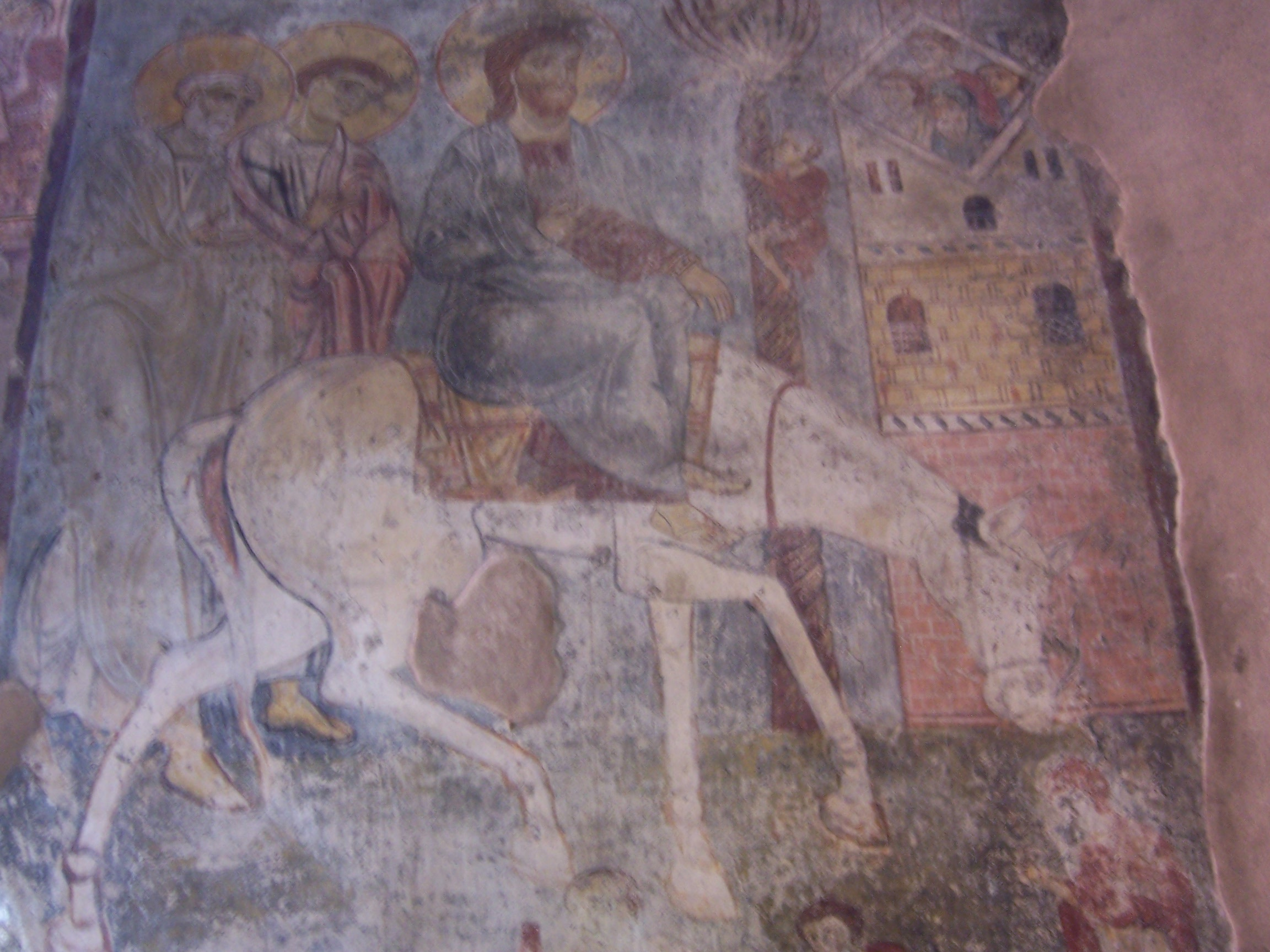
Fresco within the church

The Monastery of the Virgin, which dates back to the 10th century.

== Transportation ==
There is bus service (KTEL) from/to Rethymno serving Myriokefala

== See also ==
List of settlements in the Rethymno regional unit
