= Stimboli =

Stimboli may refer to:

- Istanbul cf. Names of Istanbul
- Argyroupoli, Rethymno, formerly Lappa, Lampa, Stimboli, or Polis.
