= Skouloufia =

Human settlement in Greece

Skouloufia Σκουλούφια
- Community
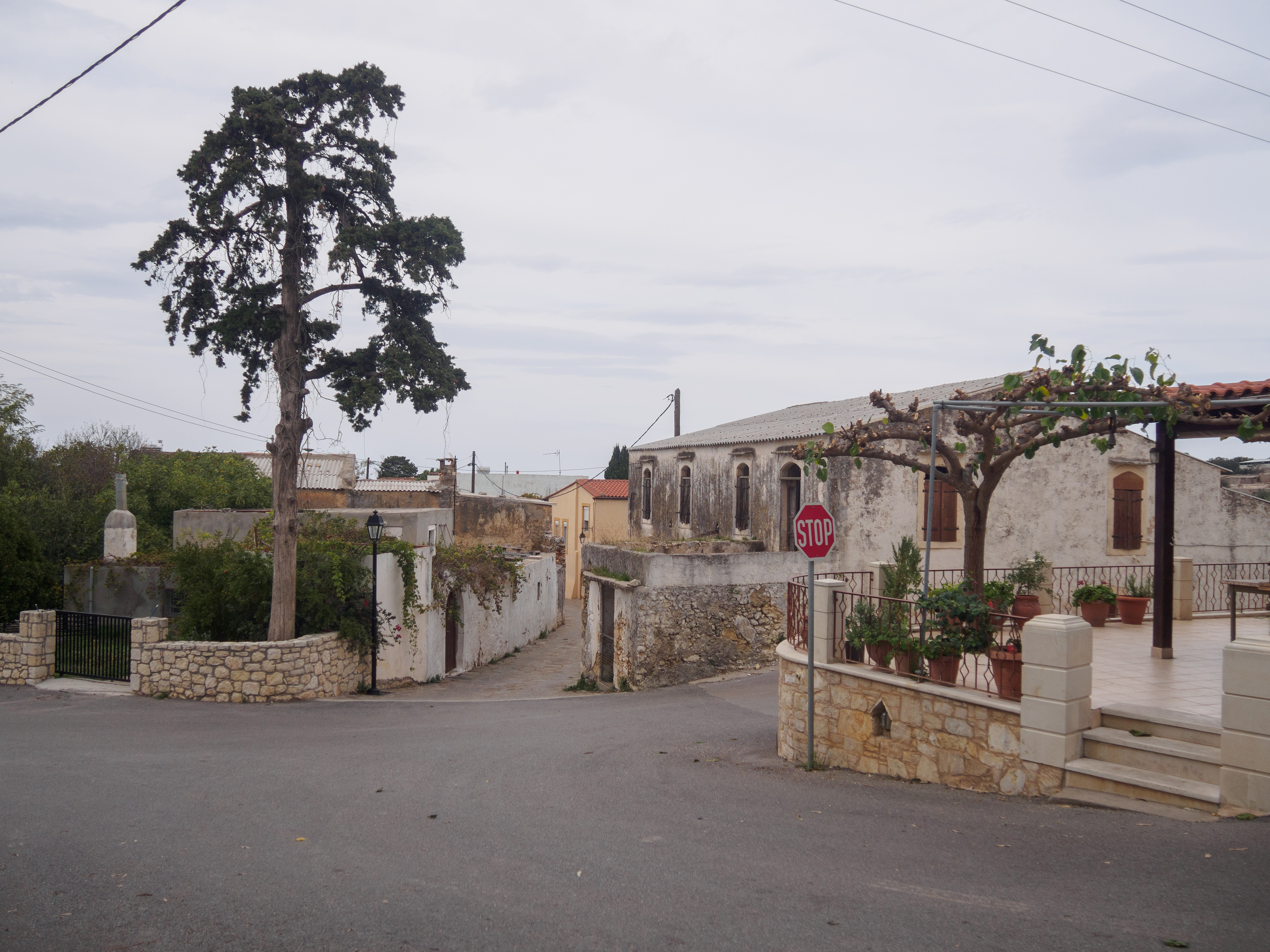
- The centre of Skouloufia village

- Location within Greece
- Coordinates: 35°21′N 24°38′E
- Country: Greece
- Administrative region: Crete
- Regional unit: Rethymno
- Municipality: Rethymno
- Municipal unit: Arkadi

Population (2021)
  - Community: 179
- Time zone: UTC+2 (EET)
  - Summer (DST): UTC+3 (EEST)

Skouloufia is a village in the Municipality of Rethymno in the island of Crete, Greece.

== History ==
The village is located near (some 5 km) the ancient city-state of Eleftherna.

The village of Skouloufia itself, has been attested in the Venetian tax registers of the 15th and 16th centuries as Spilufia, possibly named after the nearby caves.

Another source for the name is the archaic temple of Aesculapius {Aesculapia-Sculapia-Skouloufia} that was in the main street from Ancient Eleutherna to the closest port of today named Stayromenos.
