= Atsipopoulo =

Atsipopoulo Ατσιπόπουλο
- Settlement
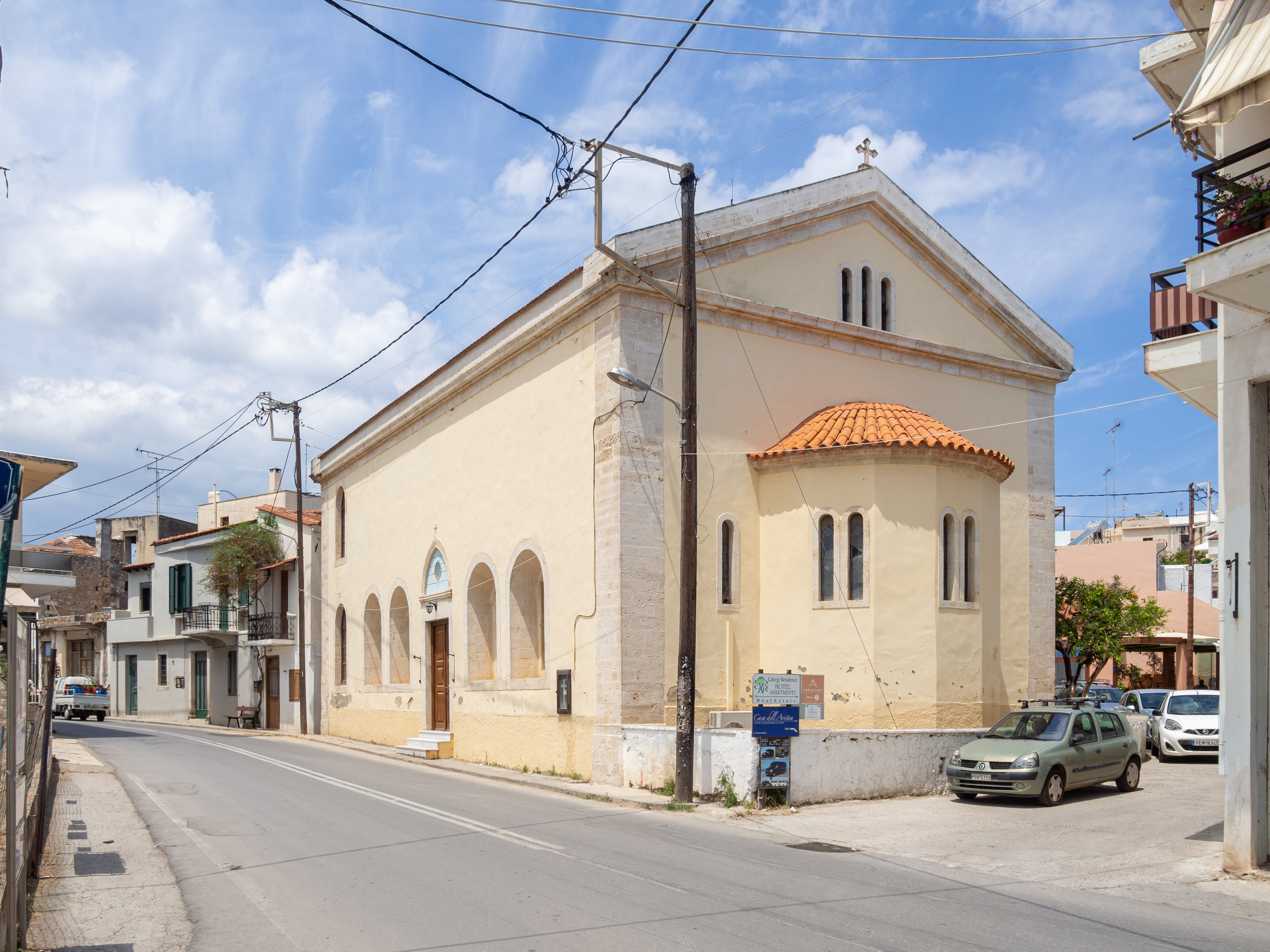

- Location within Greece
- Coordinates: 35°21′N 24°26′E
- Country: Greece
- Administrative region: Crete
- Regional unit: Rethymno
- Municipality: Rethymno
- Municipal unit: Nikiforos Fokas
  - Community: 9.449 km^{2} (3.648 sq mi)

Population (2021)
  - Community: 5,417
  - Community density: 573.3/km^{2} (1,485/sq mi)
- Time zone: UTC+2 (EET)
  - Summer (DST): UTC+3 (EEST)
- Postal code: 74100
- Area code: 28310
- Vehicle registration: ΡΕ

Atsipopoulo is a local community of the Rethymno Municipality in the Rethymno (regional unit) of the region of Crete established by Kallikratis reform. Previously, it was part of municipality of Nikiforos Fokas. Capital of the new municipality is Rethymno.

== Population ==
Population
Name	1913	1920	1928	1940	1951	1961	1971	1981	1991	2001	2011	2021
Atsipopoulo	800	681	681	704	600	542	469	462	645	1,429	1,392	1,612
Agna									22	85	363	135
Violi Charaki								64	253	661	2,785	3,185
Panorama								31	53	260	407	485
Total	800	681	681	704	600	542	469	557	973	2,435	4,947	5,417

== See also ==
List of settlements in the Rethymno regional unit
