= Nikephoros Phokas (disambiguation) =

Nikephoros Phokas (Greek: Νικηφόρος Φωκάς) can refer to:

- Nikephoros II Phokas (died 969), distinguished Byzantine general and Emperor from 963 to 969
- Nikephoros Phokas the Elder (died ca. 896/900), an eminent Byzantine general, grandfather of emperor Nikephoros II Phokas
- Nikephoros Phokas Barytrachelos (died 1022), great-nephew of the emperor and rebel
- Nikiforos Fokas, a municipality in Greece named after the emperor
