= Gerani, Rethymno =

Gerani Γεράνι
- Community
- Location within Greece
- Coordinates: 35°21′N 24°24′E
- Country: Greece
- Administrative region: Crete
- Regional unit: Rethymno
- Municipality: Rethymno
- Municipal unit: Nikiforos Fokas

Area
  - Community: 11.399 km^{2} (4.401 sq mi)

Population (2021)
  - Community: 932
  - Density: 81.8/km^{2} (212/sq mi)
- Time zone: UTC+2 (EET)
  - Summer (DST): UTC+3 (EEST)
- Postal code: 74100
- Area code: 28310
- Vehicle registration: ΡΕ

Gerani is a local community of the Rethymno Municipality in the Rethymno (regional unit) of the region of Crete established by Kallikratis reform. Previously, it was part of municipality of Nikiforos Fokas. Capital of the new municipality is Rethymno.

== Geography, origin of name, history ==
Gerani is located 7.5 km west of Rethymno and in a short distance from the new national road Rethymnon-Chania, at an altitude of 90 meters. Gerani (in Greek) refers to a pump used in the old days to draw water from a well. Such a well existed in the village. The village was occupied by the Ottomans.

Population of Gerani

Name	1913	1920	1928	1940	1951	1961	1971	1981	1991	2001	2011	2021
Gerani	314	277	345	401	389	375	367	370	439	613	821	870
Petres									63	84	62	62
Total	314	277	345	401	389	375	367	370	502	697	883	932

== Sights ==
The Gerani Cave was discovered in 1968 during the construction of the new national road Rethymno-Chania. The 6 halls of this cave display magnificent stalagmites. Archaeological research within the cave has brought to light a variety of findings dating back to the Neolithic period. Some of this findings are exhibited in the Archeological Museum of Rethymno Furthermore, important material of palaeontological interest was found, dating back to the end of the Pleistocene period.

== Daily life, Festivities ==
"Parade of the Camel" takes place in the village (Ash Monday)

== Miscellaneous ==
There is public bus service (KTEL) from Rethymno ( three services, morning and noon on weekdays and not weekends)

Since 28 March 2005 the area of Gerani is included in the Cadastre system and is under the authority of the Cadastral Office of Rethymno (20 Hortatzis Str., ZIP: 74100, Rethymno, Phone n.: 0030-28310-22403)

== See also ==
List of settlements in the Rethymno regional unit
