= Gonia =

Gonia Γωνιά
- Community
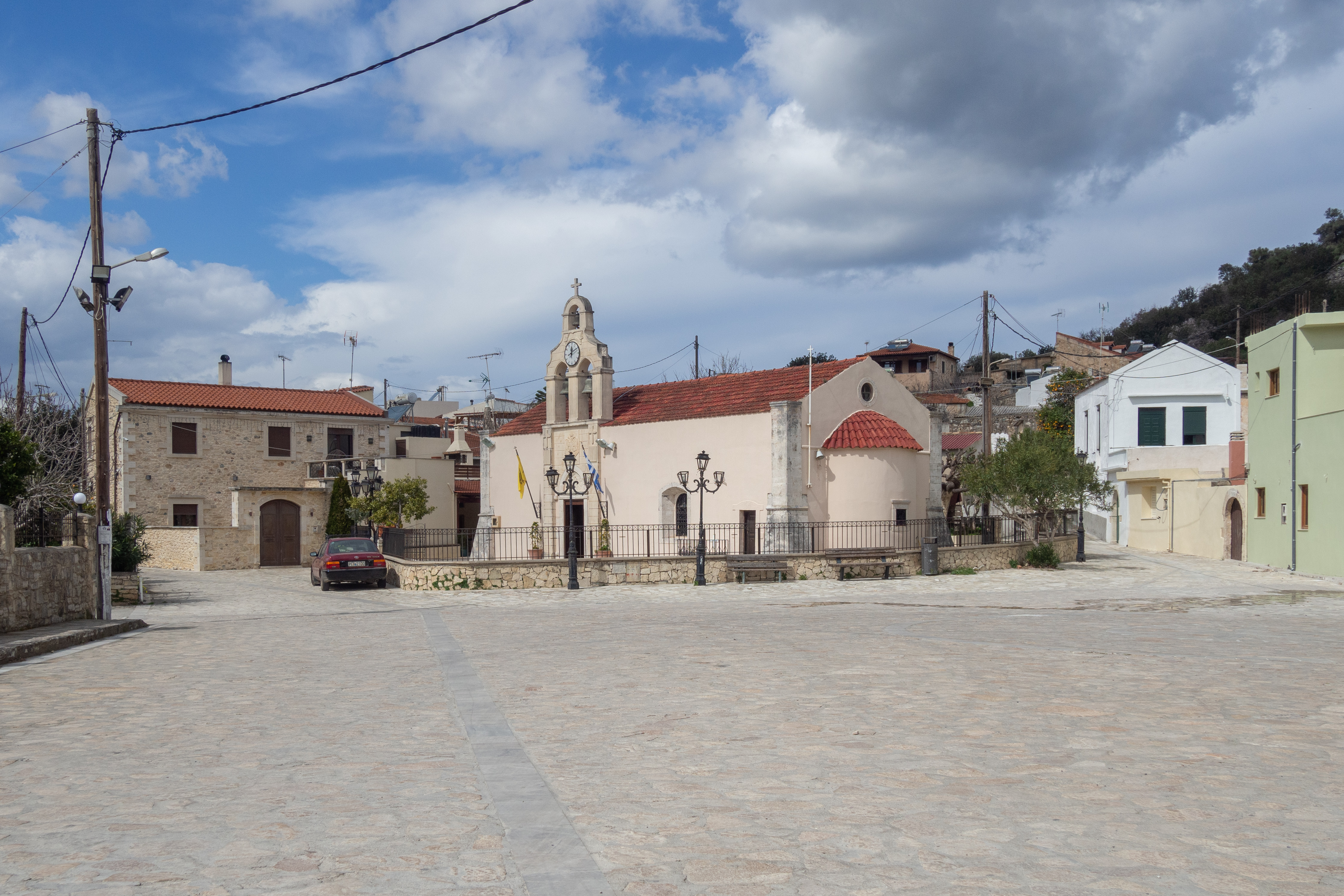
- The centre of the village

- Location within Greece
- Coordinates: 35°19′22″N 24°25′10″E
- Country: Greece
- Administrative region: Crete
- Regional unit: Rethymno
- Municipality: Rethymno
- Municipal unit: Nikiforos Fokas

Population (2021)
  - Community: 565
- Time zone: UTC+2 (EET)
  - Summer (DST): UTC+3 (EEST)

Gonia (Greek: Γωνιά) is a village in the Rethymno regional unit in Crete, Greece, lying at an altitude of ca. 222 m amsl, about 10 km southwest of the town of Rethymno. Gonia was the seat of the former municipality Nikiforos Fokas. There is a saying in Turkish “gördün mü Hanya’yı, Konya’yı / Did You see Chania and Gonia”.
