= Selli, Rethymno =

Selli Σελλί
- Community
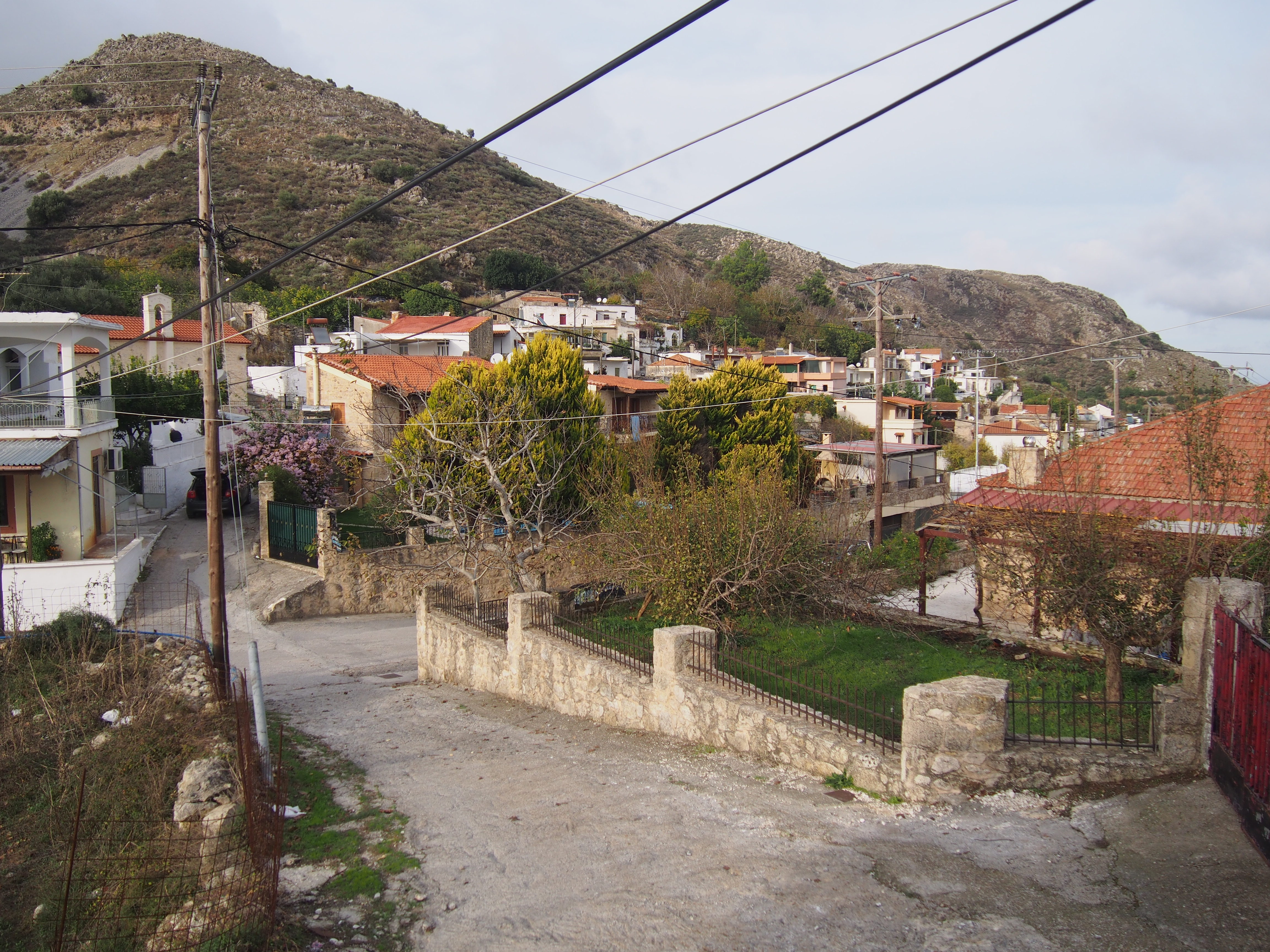

- Location within Greece
- Coordinates: 35°17′N 24°31′E
- Country: Greece
- Administrative region: Crete
- Regional unit: Rethymno
- Municipality: Rethymno
- Municipal unit: Rethymno

Area
  - Community: 13.205 km^{2} (5.098 sq mi)

Population (2021)
  - Community: 174
  - Density: 13.2/km^{2} (34.1/sq mi)
- Time zone: UTC+2 (EET)
  - Summer (DST): UTC+3 (EEST)
- Postal code: 74100
- Area code: 28310
- Vehicle registration: ΡΕ

Selli (Greek: Σελλί Ρεθύμνης) is a small village and a community in Rethymno regional unit, Crete, Greece.

It is located in a distance of 17 km from the city of Rethymno in the foothills of Mount Vrysinas. The name comes from the Byzantine word σέλλα, σελλίν, σελλία, which means seat or saddle. In Crete the word has come to mean a mountain gap and all communities built there are called σελλιά or σελλί.

The community is first recorded in 1411. During the times of Turkish domination people from Selli helped in the revolts against Turkish rule. Some of them include Stylianos G. Giakoumakis, Ioannis G. Giakoumakis, Haralambos G. Andreadakis, Ioannis Emm. Giakoumakis, A. Giakoumakis, G. Vouloumpasis, A. Andreadakis, E. Giakoumakis.

Selli's population

1881	1900	1920	1928	1940	1951	1961	1971	1981	1991	2001	2011	2021
174	176	160	195	170	168	146	131	126	146	159	184	174

== Bibliography ==
Book:O Vrysinas (Ο Βρύσινας) by author Mihalis Emm. Antonogiannakis (Μιχάλης Εμμ. Αντωνογιαννάκης)
