= Sivritos =

Sivritos Σίβριτος
- Municipal unit
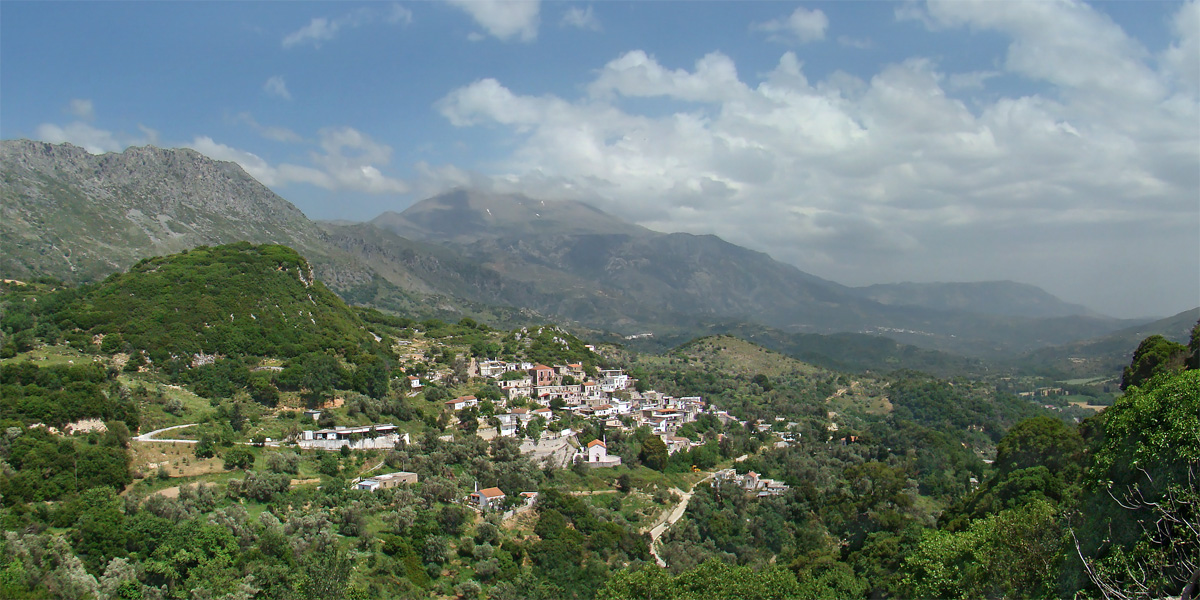
- Thronos

- Location within the regional unit

- Location within Greece
- Coordinates: 35°14′N 24°38′E
- Country: Greece
- Administrative region: Crete
- Regional unit: Rethymno
- Municipality: Amari

Area
  - Municipal unit: 151.5 km^{2} (58.5 sq mi)

Population (2021)
  - Municipal unit: 3,008
  - Municipal unit density: 19.85/km^{2} (51.42/sq mi)
- Time zone: UTC+2 (EET)
  - Summer (DST): UTC+3 (EEST)
- Vehicle registration: ΡΕ

Sivritos (Greek: Σίβριτος, also Σύβριτος - Syvritos) is a former municipality in the Rethymno regional unit, Crete, Greece. Since the 2011 local government reform it is part of the municipality Amari, of which it is a municipal unit. The municipal unit has an area of 151.547 km^{2} (58.513 sq mi). Population 3,008 (2021). The seat of the municipality was in Agia Foteini.
