= Phoenix (Crete) =

Town of ancient Crete

Coordinates: 35°11′12″N 24°20′48″E

Phoenix or Phoinix (Greek: Φοίνιξ) was the name of two towns in ancient Crete, both situated on the south coast.

One is mentioned in the Bible in the Acts of the Apostles regarding the voyage of the ship that was taking Paul the Apostle to Rome as a prisoner, where it is said that it was a port. It looked northwest and southwest and was considered a good place to spend the winter. However, a storm prevented the ship getting there. It is identified with modern Loutro. Strabo places another one on the southern coast of the island, on the isthmus that joins the western third with the rest of Crete, near modern Foinikas. Either one appears in the list of 22 cities of Crete mentioned in the Synecdemus of Hierocles in the 520s.
