= Lampi =

Lampi Λάμπη
- Municipal unit
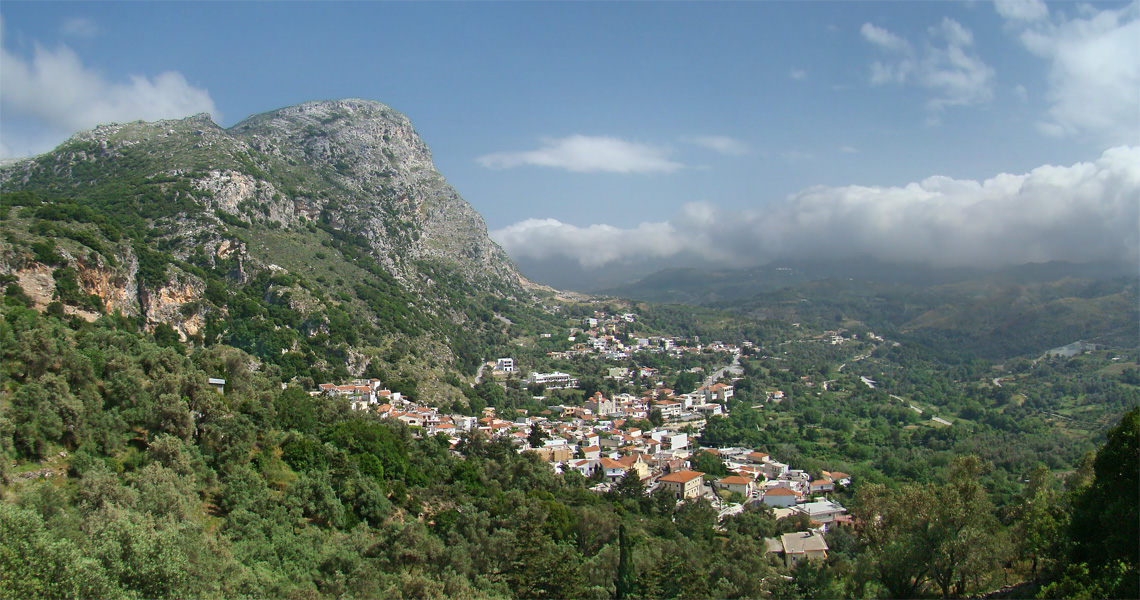
- Spili

- Location within the regional unit

- Location within Greece
- Coordinates: 35°11′N 24°30′E
- Country: Greece
- Administrative region: Crete
- Regional unit: Rethymno
- Municipality: Agios Vasileios

Area
  - Municipal unit: 220.8 km^{2} (85.3 sq mi)

Population (2021)
  - Municipal unit: 3,929
  - Municipal unit density: 17.79/km^{2} (46.09/sq mi)
- Time zone: UTC+2 (EET)
  - Summer (DST): UTC+3 (EEST)
- Vehicle registration: ΡΕ

Lampi (Greek: Λάμπη) is a former municipality in the Rethymno regional unit, Crete, Greece. Since the 2011 local government reform, it is part of the municipality Agios Vasileios, of which it is a municipal unit. The municipal unit has an area of 220.836 km^{2} (85.265 sq mi). Population 3,929 (2021). The seat of the municipality was in Spili.
