= Kourites =

Kourites Κουρήτες
- Municipal unit
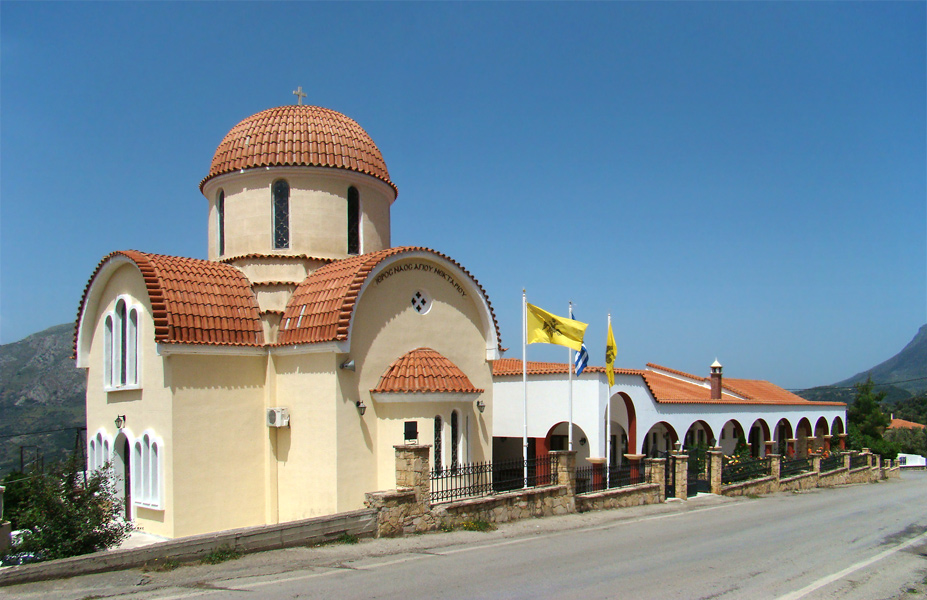
- Church of Agios Nektarios, Fourfouras

- Location within the regional unit

- Location within Greece
- Coordinates: 35°11′N 24°44′E
- Country: Greece
- Administrative region: Crete
- Regional unit: Rethymno
- Municipality: Amari

Area
  - Municipal unit: 125.7 km^{2} (48.5 sq mi)

Population (2021)
  - Municipal unit: 2,564
  - Municipal unit density: 20.40/km^{2} (52.83/sq mi)
- Time zone: UTC+2 (EET)
  - Summer (DST): UTC+3 (EEST)
- Vehicle registration: ΡΕ

Kourites (Greek: Κουρήτες) is a village and a former municipality in the Rethymno regional unit, Crete, Greece. Since the 2011 local government reform it is part of the municipality Amari, of which it is a municipal unit. The municipal unit has an area of 125.738 km^{2} (48.548 sq mi). Population 2,564 (2021). The seat of the municipality was in Fourfouras.
