= Foinikas, Crete =

Foinikas Φοίνικας
- Municipal unit
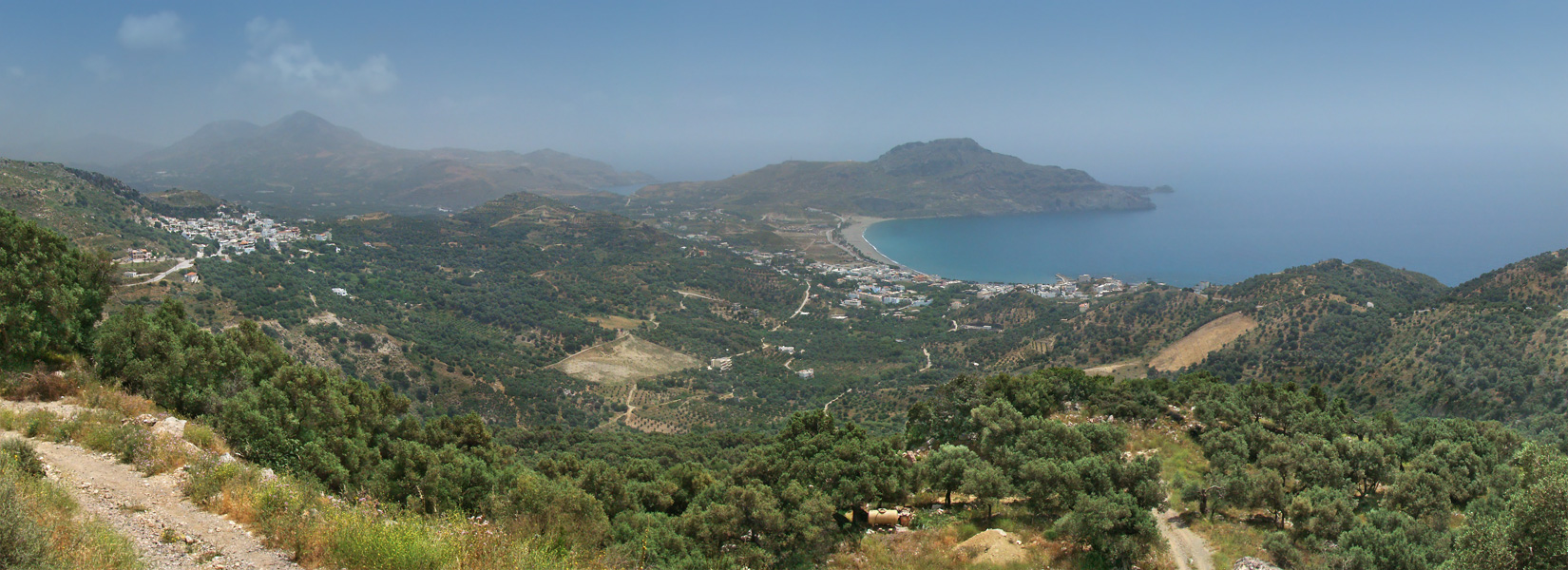
- Myrthios and Plakias

- Location within the regional unit

- Location within Greece
- Coordinates: 35°12′N 24°4′E
- Country: Greece
- Administrative region: Crete
- Regional unit: Rethymno
- Municipality: Agios Vasileios

Area
  - Municipal unit: 138.3 km^{2} (53.4 sq mi)

Population (2021)
  - Municipal unit: 3,089
  - Municipal unit density: 22.34/km^{2} (57.85/sq mi)
- Time zone: UTC+2 (EET)
  - Summer (DST): UTC+3 (EEST)
- Vehicle registration: ΡΕ

Foinikas (Greek: Φοίνικας) is a former municipality in the Rethymno regional unit, Crete, Greece. Since the 2011 local government reform, it is part of the municipality Agios Vasileios, of which it is a municipal unit. The municipal unit has an area of 138.335 km^{2} (53.411 sq mi). Population 3,089 (2021). The seat of the municipality was in Sellia.

The formed municipality contains the site of the ancient town Phoenix.
