= Lappa, Rethymno =

Lappa Λάππα
- Municipal unit
- Location within the regional unit

- Location within Greece
- Coordinates: 35°18′N 24°20′E
- Country: Greece
- Administrative region: Crete
- Regional unit: Rethymno
- Municipality: Rethymno

Area
  - Municipal unit: 51.1 km^{2} (19.7 sq mi)

Population (2021)
  - Municipal unit: 1,915
  - Municipal unit density: 37.5/km^{2} (97.1/sq mi)
- Time zone: UTC+2 (EET)
  - Summer (DST): UTC+3 (EEST)
- Vehicle registration: ΡΕ

Lappa (Greek: Λάππα) is a former municipality in the Rethymno regional unit, Crete, Greece. Since the 2011 local government reform it is part of the municipality Rethymno, of which it is a municipal unit. The municipal unit has an area of 51.132 km^{2} (19.742 sq mi). Population 1,915 (2021). The seat of the municipality was in Episkopi. The municipality's name was a revival of the name of the ancient city of Lappa, now the village of Argyroupoli.
