= Amari (municipality) =

Amari Αμάρι
- Municipality
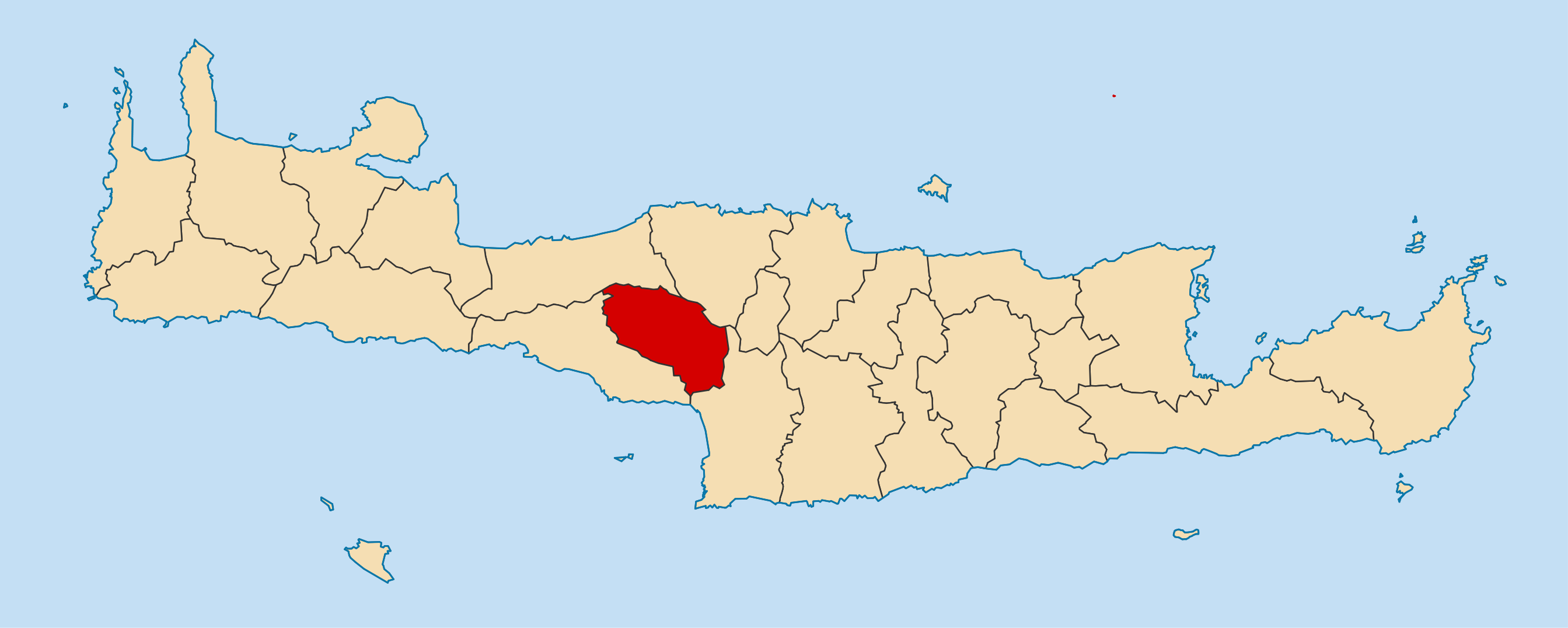

- Location within Greece
- Coordinates: 35°14′N 24°39′E
- Country: Greece
- Administrative region: Crete
- Regional unit: Rethymno
- Seat: Agia Foteini

Area
  - Municipality: 277.3 km^{2} (107.1 sq mi)

Population (2021)
  - Municipality: 5,572
  - Density: 20.09/km^{2} (52.04/sq mi)
  - Community: 189
- Time zone: UTC+2 (EET)
  - Summer (DST): UTC+3 (EEST)

Amari (Greek: Αμάρι) is a village and a municipality in Rethymno regional unit, Crete, Greece. The seat of the municipality is the village Agia Foteini. The municipal unit has an area of 277.285 km^{2} (107.060 sq mi). One of the major geographic features of Amari is the Amari Valley, a landform of high elevation known for olive cultivation. It is thought that Monastiraki was developed by Phaistos inhabitants founding a satellite center as they pushed out into the Amari Valley.

== Municipality ==
The municipality Amari was formed at the 2011 local government reform by the merger of the following 2 former municipalities, that became municipal units:

- Kourites
- Sivritos

== Province ==
The province of Amari (Greek: Επαρχία Αμαρίου) was one of the provinces of the Rethymno Prefecture. It had the same territory as the present municipality. It was abolished in 2006.
