= Pigi Airport =

- The airport as seen from the "Kefala" hill
- IATA: none; ICAO: none

Summary
- Airport type: Military
- Location: Pigi, Rethymno
- Elevation AMSL: 16 ft / 5 m
- Coordinates: 35°22′37.3″N 24°33′51.6″E

Map
- Location in Greece

Runways
Direction	Length		Surface
Direction	ft	m	Surface
	3.149	960	Asphalt

Pigi Airport (Greek: Αεροδρόμιο Πηγής) was a military airfield situated at Pigi, Crete. It was a centerpoint for the Germans during the Battle of Crete.

The former military airport of Pigi was located eight kilometres (5.0 mi) east of Rethymno and 250 m (820 ft) from the coast. It was a runway built by the British in November 1940 as part of the defense of the island in the event of an attack by the Axis powers. The residents of the nearby area (Adele, Pigi) also worked on its construction, for payment. It was 960 metres (3,150 ft) long and 120 metres (390 ft) wide. In the Battle of Crete, the capture of this airfield was the main strategic objective of the German forces. Three battalions, two Australian (2/11th and 2/1st) and one Greek were charged with its defense.

For this reason, they occupied defensive positions on the heights east of the airport, i.e. on hill "Kefala" or "Hill A", as the Australians called it, and on the heights south of the runway, on "Hill B". On 30 May the Australian troops surrendered and the Germans captured the airfield.

However, it was not a major airport and there were no anti-aircraft defense facilities or other infrastructure. According to British secret reports, the Rethymno airport was still under construction in February 1941, while the runway was suitable only for fighter aircraft. In essence, it was a simple runway. The airport stretched from the Pigian plain to Sfakaki.

Its northern side adjoined the southern side of the old Rethymno-Heraklion National Road where it has remained unchanged until today. At the west end of the airfield, there was a small Royal Air Force radio station.

In October 1944 the Germans, leaving, wreaked havoc on the airport and blew up its defense facilities. After 1945, a part of the airport began to be cultivated, and in the 1960s, a part of the runway was used by small aircraft for aerial spraying. Today, it has nothing visible except for a few cultivated parts.
