= Argyroupoli, Rethymno =

Argyroupoli Αργυρούπολη
- Community
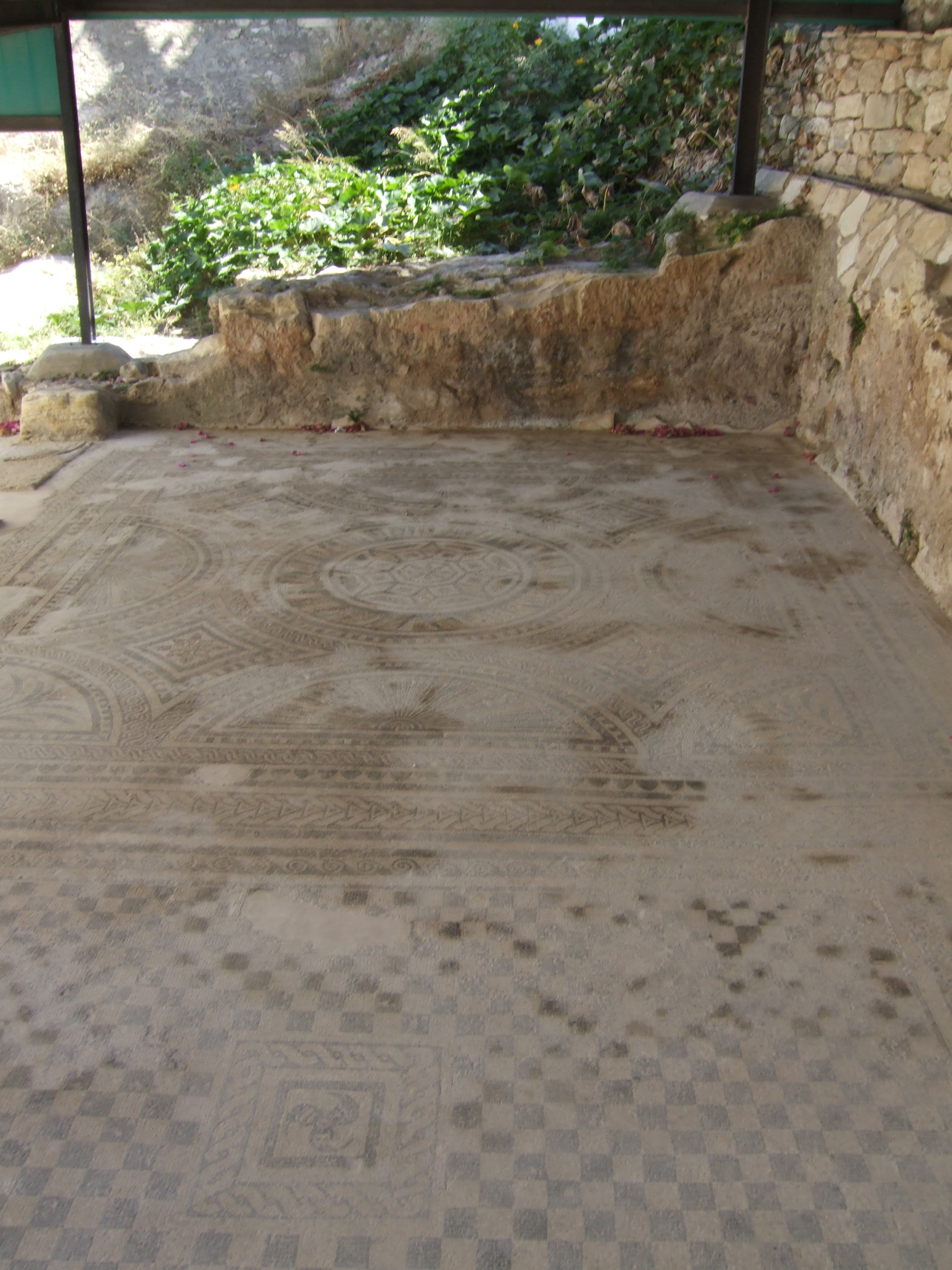

- Location within Greece
- Coordinates: 35°17′9″N 24°20′6″E
- Country: Greece
- Administrative region: Crete
- Regional unit: Rethymno
- Municipality: Rethymno
- Municipal unit: Lappa

Population (2021)
  - Community: 313
- Time zone: UTC+2 (EET)
  - Summer (DST): UTC+3 (EEST)

Argyroupoli (Greek: Αργυρούπολη) is a village in the municipality of Rethymno, Rethymno regional unit, Crete, Greece, with a population of 313 (2021 census) and an altitude of 260 m. It was previously known as Lappa or Lampa, Stimboli, and Polis.

== Name ==
It is the site of the ancient city (polis) of Lappa. In the Middle Ages, it was named Stimpoli(s) by reinterpretation as a single word ("in the city"), later simply Polis. Until 1669, the name Αργυρούπολις 'Silver City' was used. In the seventeenth century, it was also called facetiously Σαμαρόπολις, Γαϊδαρόπολις 'donkey city', or Γαϊδουρόπολις. From 1868-1878, it was called Stambolköy in Turkish (that is, 'Stambol village'). The name Αργυρούπολις or Αργυρόπολις was revived in 1878.

The name of the municipality of Lappa of which it is a part is a revival of the ancient name for the city.

== History ==
Lappa was probably a colony of Tarrha.

It was taken by storm and almost entirely destroyed by the Romans. The emperor Augustus restored it and in consideration of the aid rendered him in his struggle with Marcus Antonius, he bestowed on the citizens their freedom, and with it the right of coinage.

== Population ==
Population of the modern town of Argyroupoli:

1928	1940	1951	1961	1971	1981	1991	2001	2011	2021
767	836	704	669	501	453	396	402	403	313

== Ecclesiastical history ==
Lappa or Lampa was an episcopal see, suffragan of Gortyn.

Le Quien (Oriens Christianus, II, 268) mentions the following bishops:

- Petrus, who attended the First Council of Ephesus, 431;
- Deneltius, at the Council of Chalcedon, 451;
- Prosdocius, in 458;
- John, who appealed to Rome against his metropolitan Paul, and attended the Council of Constantinople, 667;
- Epiphanius at the Second Council of Nicaea, 787.

The episcopal see is mentioned in the Notitiae episcopatuum as late as the twelfth and thirteenth centuries.

It was re-established by the Orthodox Church about the end of the nineteenth century; the bishop resides in the monastery of Preveli.

It is also a titular see of the Catholic Church under the name Lappa and previously under the name Lampa.
