= Agios Vasileios, Rethymno =

Agios Vasileios Άγιος Βασίλειος
- Municipality
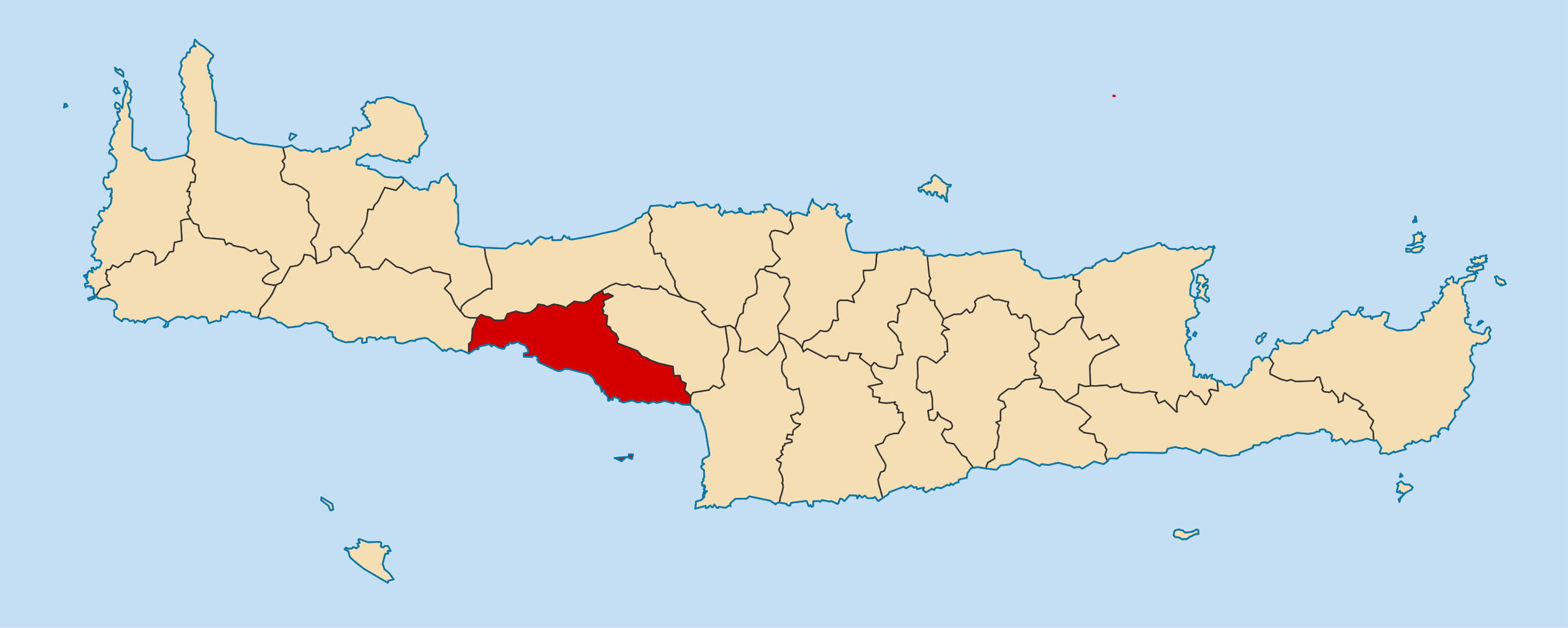

- Location within Greece
- Coordinates: 35°15′N 24°27′E
- Country: Greece
- Administrative region: Crete
- Regional unit: Rethymno

Area
  - Municipality: 359.2 km^{2} (138.7 sq mi)

Population (2021)
  - Municipality: 7,018
  - Density: 19.54/km^{2} (50.60/sq mi)
  - Community: 200
- Time zone: UTC+2 (EET)
  - Summer (DST): UTC+3 (EEST)

Agios Vasileios (Greek: Άγιος Βασίλειος) is a village and a municipality in Rethymno regional unit, Crete, Greece. The seat of the municipality is the village Spili. The municipality has an area of 359.171 km^{2} (138.677 sq mi).

== Municipality ==
The municipality Agios Vasileios was formed at the 2011 local government reform by the merger of the following 2 former municipalities, that became municipal units:

- Foinikas
- Lampi

== Province ==
The province of Agios Vasileios (Greek: Επαρχία Αγίου Βασιλείου) was one of the provinces of the Rethymno Prefecture. It had the same territory as the present municipality. It was abolished in 2006.
