= Rethymno (municipality) =

Rethymno Ρέθυμνο
- Municipality
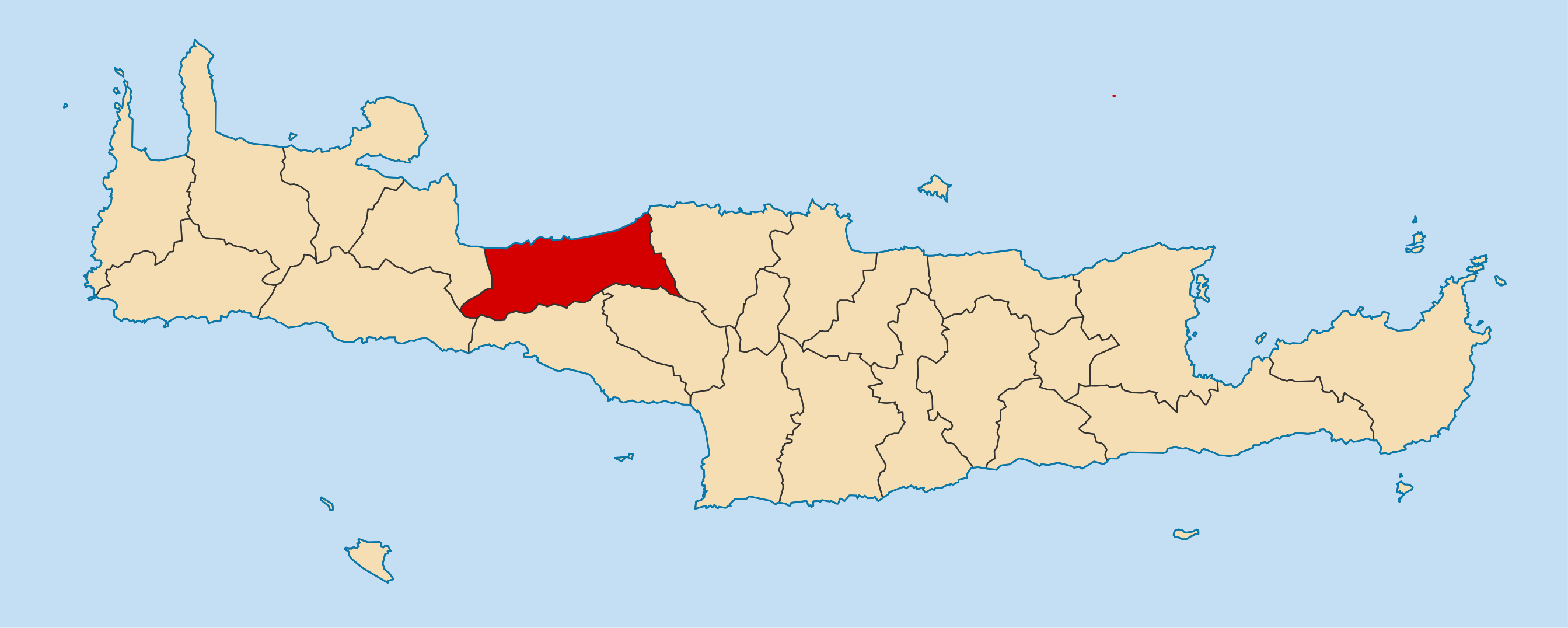

- Location within Greece
- Coordinates: 35°22′N 24°28′E
- Country: Greece
- Administrative region: Crete
- Regional unit: Rethymno
- Seat: Rethymno

Government
  - Mayor: Giorgis Marinakis (since 2019)

Area
  - Municipality: 396.3 km^{2} (153.0 sq mi)
- Elevation: 17 m (56 ft)

Population (2021)
  - Municipality: 57,216
  - Density: 144.4/km^{2} (373.9/sq mi)
- Time zone: UTC+2 (EET)
  - Summer (DST): UTC+3 (EEST)
- Postal code: 741 00
- Area code: 28310
- Vehicle registration: ΡΕ
- Website: www.rethymno.gr

The Municipality of Rethymno (Greek: Δήμος Ρεθύμνης) is a municipality in the Rethymno of the region of Crete established by Kallikratis reform. It consists of the unification of the pre-existing municipalities Arkadi, Lappa, Rethymno and Nikiforos Fokas of Rethymno Prefecture. The extent of the new municipality is 396.256 km^{2} (152.995 sq mi), and it had a population of 57,216 inhabitants at the 2021 census. The seat of the new municipality is the town Rethymno.

== Subdivisions ==
The Municipality of Rethymno consists of the following communities:

- Municipal unit of Arkadi: local communities of: Adele, Amnatos, Ancient Eleftherna, Eleftherna Village, Erfi, Kyrianna, Mesi, Pangalohori, Pigi, Prinos, Skouloufia, Chamalevri, Charkia
- Municipal unit of Lappa: local communities of: Argyroupoli, Archondiki, Vilandredo, Episkopi, Karoti, Kato Poros, Koufi, Myriokefala
- Municipal unit of Nikiforos Fokas: municipal community of Atsipopoulo and local communities of: Agios Kostantinos, Ano Valsamonero, Gerani, Gonia, Zouridi, Kaloniktis, Kato Valsamonero, Kato Malaki, Mountros, Prines, Roustika, Saitoures, Frantzeskiana Metochia
- Municipal unit of Rethymno: municipal community of Rethymno and local communities of: Armeni, Goulediana, Kare, Kastelos, Koumi, Maroulas, Oros, Prasies, Rousospiti, Selli, Chromonastiri

== Agenda of cultural events in the municipality ==
- February: Carnival (Rethymno), Smudge (Armeni)
- June: Renaissance Festival (Rethymno)
- July: Renaissance Festival (Rethymno), Feast of St. Panteleimon (Adele, Chromonastiri), Feast of the Prophet Elias (Eleftherna)
- August: Cultural events (Rethymno), Maritime Week (Rethymno)
- September: Feast of Virgin Mary (Myriokefala)

== Cadastre ==
Several areas of this municipality are included in the Cadastre system and is under the authority of the Cadastral Office of Rethymno, namely: the area and the suburbs of the city of Rethymno since 12 March 2012, Adele since 18 Mai 2006, Argyroupoli since 28 March 2005, Armenoi since 15 September 2005, Atsipopoulo since 3 January 2006, Gerani since 28 March 2005, Episkopi, Archontiki, Koufi and Karoti since 21 July 2005, Maroulas since 21 July 2005, Prasies since 7 July 2005, Prines since 6 October 2005, Rousospiti since 21 July 2005, Chromonastiri since 7 July 2005

== Province ==
The province of Rethymno (Greek: Επαρχία Ρεθύμνης) was one of the provinces of the Rethymno Prefecture. It had the same territory as the present municipality. It was abolished in 2006.
