= Arkadi =

Arkadi Αρκάδι
- Municipal unit
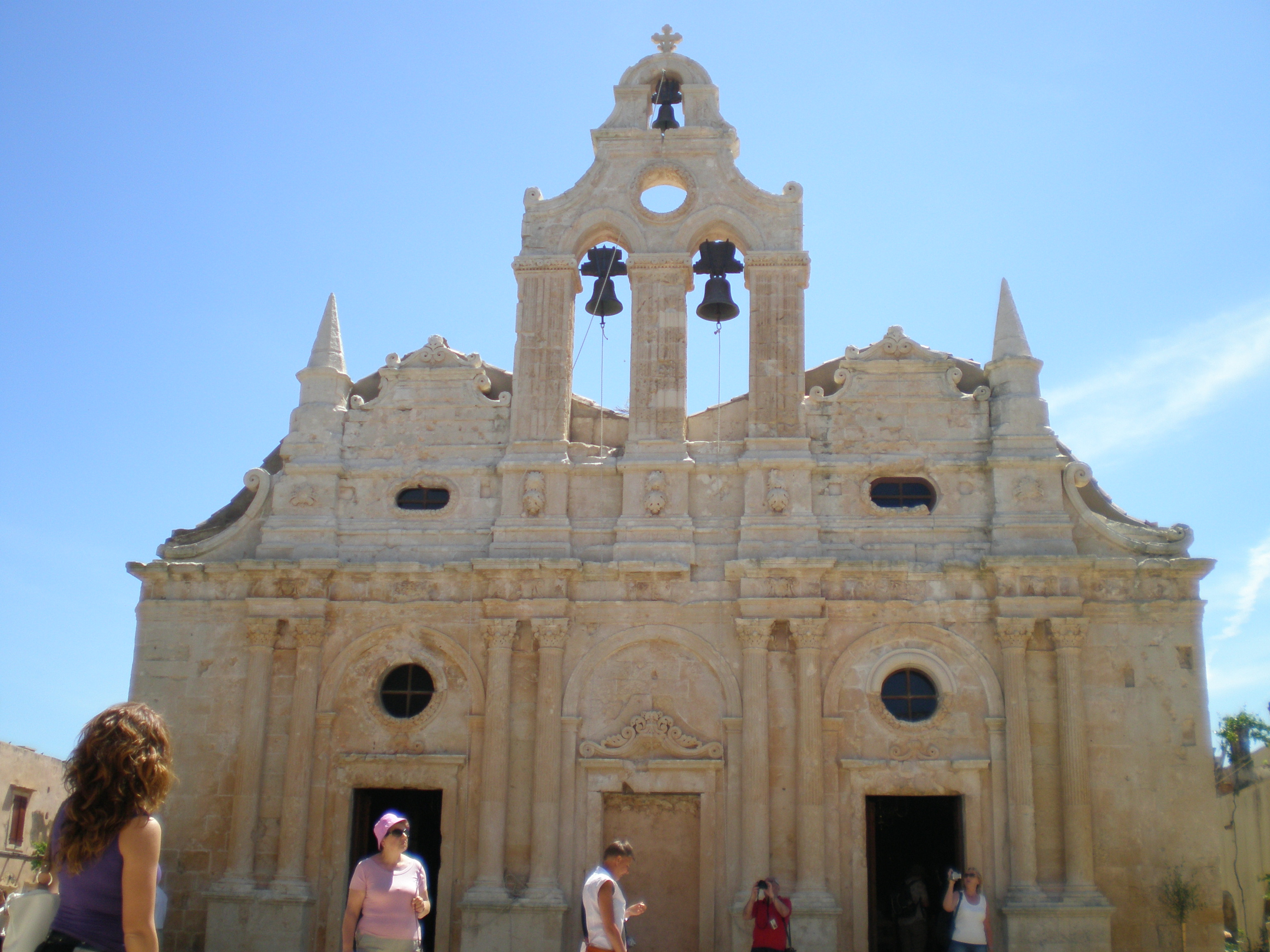
- View of the Monastery of Arkadi.

- Location within the regional unit

- Location within Greece
- Coordinates: 35°18.632′N 24°37.711′E
- Country: Greece
- Administrative region: Crete
- Regional unit: Rethymno
- Municipality: Rethymno

Area
  - Municipal unit: 123.0 km^{2} (47.5 sq mi)

Population (2021)
  - Municipal unit: 7,154
  - Municipal unit density: 58.16/km^{2} (150.6/sq mi)
- Time zone: UTC+2 (EET)
  - Summer (DST): UTC+3 (EEST)
- Vehicle registration: ΡΕ

Arkadi (Greek: Αρκάδι) is a former municipality in the Rethymno regional unit, Crete, Greece. Since the 2011 local government reform it is part of the municipality Rethymno, of which it is a municipal unit. The municipal unit has an area of 123.027 km^{2} (47.501 sq mi). Population 7,154 (2021). The seat of the municipality was in Adele. Arkadi is renowned for its famous monastery. It is the site of the Holocaust of Arkadi.
