= Nikiforos Fokas =

Nikiforos Fokas Νικηφόρος Φωκάς
- Municipal unit
- Location within the regional unit

- Location within Greece
- Coordinates: 35°18′N 24°24′E
- Country: Greece
- Administrative region: Crete
- Regional unit: Rethymno
- Municipality: Rethymno

Area
  - Municipal unit: 95.6 km^{2} (36.9 sq mi)

Population (2021)
  - Municipal unit: 9,388
  - Municipal unit density: 98.2/km^{2} (254/sq mi)
- Time zone: UTC+2 (EET)
  - Summer (DST): UTC+3 (EEST)
- Vehicle registration: ΡΕ

Nikiforos Fokas (Greek: Νικηφόρος Φωκάς) is a former municipality in the Rethymno regional unit, Crete, Greece. Since the 2011 local government reform it is part of the municipality Rethymno, of which it is a municipal unit. The municipal unit has an area of 95.64 km^{2} (36.93 sq mi). It was named after the 10th century Byzantine Emperor Nikephoros II Phokas, who retook the island from the Muslims. Population 9,388 (2021). The seat of the municipality was in Gonia. The ancient city of Eleutherna is located within the municipal unit.
