= Rethymno (regional unit) =

Rethymno Περιφερειακή ενότητα Ρεθύμνου
- Regional unit
- Municipalities of Rethymno

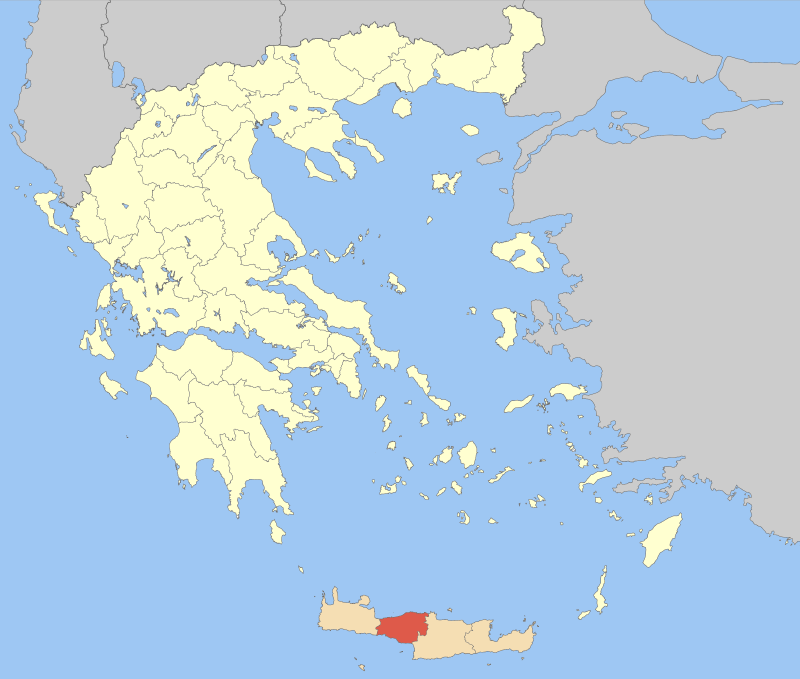
- Rethymno within Greece

- Location within Greece
- Coordinates: 35°15′N 24°35′E
- Country: Greece
- Administrative region: Crete
- Seat: Rethymno

Area
  - Total: 1,496 km^{2} (578 sq mi)

Population (2021)
  - Total: 84,866
  - Density: 56.73/km^{2} (146.9/sq mi)
- Time zone: UTC+2 (EET)
  - Summer (DST): UTC+3 (EEST)
- Postal code: 74x xx
- Area code: 283x0
- Vehicle registration: ΡΕ
- Website: www.rethymnon.gr

Rethymno (Greek: Περιφερειακή ενότητα Ρεθύμνου) is one of the four regional units of Crete, Greece. Its capital is the city of Rethymno. Today, its main income is tourism. The countryside is also based economically on agriculture and herding. The tallest mountains in the regional unit include Mt Psiloritis (Mt Ida) reaching 2,456 metres, Mt Kedros reaching 1,777 metres, and Mt Kouloukonas (Talean Mtns) reaching 1,084 metres.

== Administration ==
The regional unit Rethymno is subdivided into five municipalities. These are (number as in the map in the infobox):

- Agios Vasileios (2)
- Amari (3)
- Anogeia (4)
- Mylopotamos (5)
- Rethymno (1)

=== Prefecture ===
The Rethymno prefecture (Greek: Νομός Ρεθύμνου or Ρεθύμνης) was created while Crete was still an autonomous state, and was preserved after the island joined Greece in 1913. As a part of the 2011 Kallikratis government reform, the Rethymno regional unit was created out of the former prefecture. The prefecture had the same territory as the present regional unit. At the same time, the municipalities were reorganised, according to the table below.

New municipality	Old municipalities	Seat
Agios Vasileios	Lampi	Spili
Agios Vasileios	Foinikas	Spili
Amari	Kourites	Agia Foteini
Amari	Sivritos	Agia Foteini
Anogeia	Anogeia	Anogeia
Mylopotamos	Geropotamos	Perama
Mylopotamos	Kouloukonas	Perama
Mylopotamos	Zoniana	Perama
Rethymno	Rethymno	Rethymno
Rethymno	Arkadi	Rethymno
Rethymno	Lappa	Rethymno
Rethymno	Nikiforos Fokas	Rethymno

=== Provinces ===
- Rethymno Province - Rethymno
- Agios Vasileios Province - Spili
- Amari Province - Amari
- Mylopotamos Province - Perama

Note: Provinces no longer hold any legal status in Greece.

== Main towns ==
The main towns of the regional unit Rethymno are (ranked by 2021 census population):

- Rethymno 34,085
- Violi Charaki 3,185
- Anogeia 2,201

== Notable people ==
- Kostas Moundakis
- Nikos Xilouris
- Thanassis Skordalos
- Nick the Greek

== See also ==
- List of settlements in the Rethymno regional unit
