= Apollonia =

Apollonia or Apolonia is a Greek feminine name meaning "belonging to Apollo" or "dedicated to Apollo," referencing the Greek god of light, music, healing, and arts, carrying connotations of beauty, strength, and intellect; it may refer to:

== Places and jurisdictions ==
=== Albania ===
- Apollonia (Illyria), now Pojani (Polina) in Albania; former bishopric, now Latin titular see

=== Bulgaria ===
- Apollonia, Thrace, now Sozopol, Bulgaria

=== Greece ===
- Apollonia (Aetolia), a town near Naupactus
- Apollonia (Argolis), also known as Troezen
- Apollonia (Athos), a city on Mount Athos
- Apollonia (Chalcidice), a city in the Chalcidice
- Apollonia (Echinades), a town in the Echniades
- Apollonia (Kavala), a city in Kavala, northern Greece
- Apollonia (Mygdonia), an inland city near modern Apollonia, Thessaloniki, reportedly visited by the Apostle Paul
- Apollonia, Sifnos (ancient town), an ancient town on the island of Sifnos
- Apollonia (Sifnos), the main town on the island of Sifnos, taking its name from the former
- Apollonia, Thessaloniki
- Five cities on Crete:
  - Apellonia, also called Apollonia, on the north coast
  - Apollonia (northern Crete), on the north coast
  - Apollonia (southern Crete), on the south coast
  - Eleutherna, inland city also called Apollonia
  - Kydonia, also called Apollonia

=== Italy ===
- Apollonia (Sicily) in Northern Sicily
- Sant'Apollonia (Ancona), in Corinaldo, province of Ancona
- Sant'Apollonia (Brescia), township in Ponte di Legno, province of Brescia
- Sant'Apollonia (Lecco), township in Viganò, locality of Lecco
- Sant'Apollonia (Padua), township in Bagnoli di Sopra Padua, Veneto
- Sant'Apollonia (Turin), township in Val della Torre, province Turin, in the Piedmont region
- Fondamenta Sant'Apollonia, in Venice, Veneto

=== Asia ===
- Surabaya, Indonesia; formerly the Dutch settlement of Fort Apollonia
- Apollonia-Arsuf, near modern Herzliya, Israel

Anatolia (Turkey)

- Apollonia (Lycia), an ancient city in Lycia
- Apollonia (Lydia), an ancient city in Lydia, also Apollonis
- Apollonia (Mysia), an ancient city in Mysia
- Apollonia (Pisidia) (later called Sozopolis), an ancient city in Pisidia
- Apollonia ad Rhyndacum, a town astride the river Rhyndacus in Bithynia next to the lake Apolloniatis
- Apollonia Salbaces, an ancient city in Anatolia
- Assos, also called Apollonia
- Tripolis on the Meander, also called Apollonia

=== Elsewhere ===
- Sainte-Apollonie island (Île de Sainte-Apollonie), on the Mayenne river in Pays de la Loire, France
- Fort Apollonia, Beyin, Ghana
- Apollonia, Cyrenaica, Libya
- Apolonia, Texas, US
- Apollonia, Wisconsin, US

=== In space ===
- 358 Apollonia, a large main belt asteroid
- Apollonia (Mercury), an albedo feature on the planet Mercury

== People ==
- Saint Apollonia of Alexandria (died 249)
- Apolonia Ustrzycka (1736–1814), Polish noblewoman
- Apolonia Muñoz Abarca (1920–2009), American healthcare campaigner
- Apollonia Hirscher (died 1547) was a Transylvanian Saxon merchant of what is now Brașov in Romania
- Apollonia Kickius (1669–1695), Scottish painter
- Apollonia Seydelmann (died 1840) German-italian miniaturist
- Apolonia Dorregaray Veli (1914–2002), Peruvian artist, maker of mate burilado
- Apollonia Kotero (born 1959), American musician and actress
  - Apollonia 6, a musical group led by Apollonia Kotero
- Apolonia Litwińska (1928–2021), Polish chess player
- Apollonia Mathia (died 2011), South Sudanese journalist
- Apollonia Poilâne (born 1984), French baker
- Apolonia Vaivai (born 1981), Fijian weightlifter
- Apollonia van Ravenstein (born 1954), Dutch model and actress

=== Fictional ===
- Apollonia Vitelli Corleone, a character in Mario Puzo's The Godfather saga
- Apollonia, a.k.a. The Black Knight, a playable character in the Japanese gacha game Granblue Fantasy

== Other uses ==
- Apolonia, Apolonia, 2022 documentary film directed by Lea Glob
- Apollonia University, a private university in Iași, Romania
- FK Apolonia Fier, an Albanian football club based in Fier

== See also ==
- Apollonias, a genus of plants in the family Lauraceae
- Apolloniatis (disambiguation)
- Apollonopolis (disambiguation)
