= List of ancient Greek cities =

This is an incomplete list of ancient Greek cities, including colonies outside Greece, and including settlements that were not sovereign poleis. Many colonies outside Greece were soon assimilated to some other language, but a city is included here if at any time its population or the dominant stratum within it spoke Greek. Also included are some cities that were not Greek-speaking or Hellenic, but contributed to the Hellenic culture of the region.

== A ==
Ancient name	Location	Modern name	Also known as
Abdera	Thrace (near Xanthi), Greece	Avdira	
Abila	13 km north-northeast of Irbid, Jordan	Harta or Hartha	Abila Dekapoleos, Abila (Greek: Ἄβιλα), Seleucia (Greek: Σελεύκεια), Seleuceia, Seleukeia, Seleukheia, Ancient Raphana
Abydos	North of Çanakkale, East Bank of Hellespont	Nağara, pronounced Nara	Abydus
Acanthus	Athos	Ierissos	Erisso
Acharnae	near Acharnes and Ano Liosia, about 10 km north of Athens	Acharnes	Menidi
Actium	mouth of the Ambracian Gulf	Punta, abandoned	
Adramyttium	Edremit (Town), Balıkesir	Edremit (Town)	Adramyttion, Adramytteion, Atramyttion
Aegae	Central Macedonia, near modern Vergina, Greece	abandoned	Aigai
Aegina	island in the Saronic Gulf, 27 km (17 mi) from Athens	Aegina	
Aegium	Achaea, Greece	Aigio (Αίγιο)	Egio, Egion
Aenea	Chalcidice, northern Greece	abandoned	Ainea
Aenus	Turkish Thrace	Enez	Poltyobria, Poltymbria
Agrinion	Aetolia-Acarnania, 3 km south-west of modern Agrinio	abandoned	Agrinium
Aigosthena	Attica	abandoned	Egosthena
Akragas (Akragasta)	Sicily (Italio)	Agrigento	Agrigentum, Kerkent, Girgenti
Akrai	Sicily	Palazzolo Acreide	Acrae
Akrillai	Hyblaean Mountains, south-eastern Sicily	Chiaramonte Gulfi	Acrillae, Gulfi
Akroinon	western Turkey	Afyonkarahisar	Hapanuwa, Nicopolis, Kara Hissar, Afyon, Karahisar-i Sahip, Afium-Kara-hissar, Afyon Karahisar
Akrotiri (Ακρωτήρι)	Thera/Santorini, Greece	Akrotiri	
Alalcomenae	Ithaca	abandoned	
Alalia	Corsica	Aléria	Aleria, Alaliē (Ἀλαλίη)
Alexándreia (Ἀλεξάνδρεια)	northern Egypt	Alexandria	al-Iskandariyya, Rakotə, Eskendereyya (اسكندريه)
Alexandretta	southern Turkey	İskenderun	al-'İskandarūn (الإسكندرون)
Alexandria Arachosia	southern Afghanistan	Qandahar	
Alexandria Ariana	western Afghanistan	Herat	
Alexandria Asiana	Iran		
Alexandria Babylonia	Iraq	Iskandariya	Alexandria of Iraq
Alexandria Bucephalous	Pakistan	Jhelum, or more likely Phalia	
Alexandria in the Caucasus	near modern Bagram, Afghanistan		Kapisa
Alexandria Eschate	Fergana Valley	Khujand	Alexandria the Furthest, Khüjand, Khodzhent, Khudchand, Chodjend, Ispisar, Leninabad, Leninobod
Alexandria on the Indus	at the confluence of the Indus and Chenab rivers, Pakistan, 13 km from modern Uch	abandoned	Uch, Uch Sharif, Alexandria at the Head of the Punjab
Alexandria on the Oxus	near Kunduz, northern Afghanistan	abandoned	Ai-Khanoum, Ay Khanum, possibly Eucratidia
Alexandria Troas	Troad region of Turkey		Alexandria of the Troad, Sigia, Antigonia Troas,
Alinda	near Karpuzlu, Turkey	abandoned	possibly Alexandria by the Latmos
Amarynthos	Euboea, Greece	Amarynthos	Vathia (Médiéval name)
Amaseia	Yeşilırmak River, northern Turkey	Amasya	Amáseia (Αμάσεια)
Ambracia	Epirus		
Amida	banks of the River Tigris, south-eastern Turkey	Diyarbakır	Diyâr-ı Bekr, Amed, Āmîḏ (ܐܡܝܕ)
Amisos	Black Sea coast, Turkey	Samsun	Amisus, Eis Amison, Samsunta, Samsus, Samson, Samsounta
Amnisos	Crete, Greece		Phocis, Greece
Amphicaea	Boeotia, Greece	Amfikleia	Amphicleia
Amphigeneia	Peloponnese, southern Greece	abandoned	
Amphipolis	Central Macedonia, Greece	Amfipoli	
Amphissa	Phocis, Greece	Amfissa	Salona
Ankon (Ἀγκών)	Adriatic coast of central Italy	Ancona	
Antigonea	Chaonia, southern Albania	abandoned	
Antipatrea	Illyria, southern Albania	Berat	Beligrad
Antioch on the Maeander	south western Turkey, near Kuyucak	abandoned	Antiochia on the Maeander, Antiochia ad Mæandrum, Pythopolis
Antioch, Mygdonia	south eastern Turkey	Nusaybin	Soba, Nisibis
Antioch on the Orontes	eastern side of the Orontes River, near modern Antakya, Turkey		Antiochia ad Orontem, Great Antioch, Syrian Antioch
Antioch, Pisidia	1 km northeast of Yalvaç, Isparta Province, Turkey		Antiochia in Pisidia, Pisidian Antioch (Greek: Ἀντιόχεια τῆς Πισιδίας), Antiochia Caesareia, Antiochia Caesaria, Antiochia in Phrygia
Antiochia ad Taurum	near Gaziantep, Turkey	abandoned	Antiochia in the Taurus
Andros	Cyclades, approximately 10 km (6.2 mi) south east of Euboea		
Apamea	on the Orontes River, about 55 km northwest of Hama, Syria	abandoned	Apameia (Απάμεια), Afamia (أفاميا or آفاميا)
Apamea	near the confluence of the Tigris and Euphrates, in Iraq	abandoned	Apameia (Απάμεια)
Apamea	Sittacene, Iraq, surrounded by the Tigris	abandoned	Apameia (Απάμεια)
Apamea	near Nahavand, Iran	abandoned	Apameia (Απάμεια)
Apamea Myrlea	on the Sea of Marmara, south of Mudanya, Turkey	abandoned	Apamea Myrleon, Apameia Myrleanos, Brylleion, Myrlea (Μύρλεια), Murleia, Myrleia, Colonia Iulia Concordia, Apamena.
Apamea	lake formed by the Birecik Dam, Şanlıurfa Province, Turkey	abandoned	Apameia (Απάμεια)
Apamea	Phrygia, Turkey	Dinar	Apameia (Απάμεια), Kibotos (κιβωτός), hê Kibôtos, Cibotus
Apamea Ragiana	Media, Iran	abandoned	Apamea Rhagiana, Apamea Raphiana, Apameia Rhagiane, Arsace, Khuvar, Choara
Aphidnae	Attica, Greece, about 28 km north of Athens	Afidnes (Αφιδνές, Αφίδναι)	Afidnai
Apollonia	Illyria, southernAlbania	abandoned	
Apollonia	Mygdonia, northern Greece	abandoned	
Apollonia	Pirgos Apollonias, northern Greece, opposite Thasos	abandoned	
Apollonia	Chalcidice, northern Greece	abandoned	
Apollonia	Aetolia, north western Greece	abandoned	
Apollonia	Acte peninsular, northern Greece	abandoned	
Apollonia	north coast of Crete, near Knossos	abandoned	
Apollonia	south coast of Crete	abandoned	
Apollonia	Sicily	possibly Pollina	
Apollonia	Cyrenaica, Libya	abandoned	
Apollonia	Mysia, western Turkey	abandoned	
Apollonia ad Rhyndacum	Mysia, western Turkey	abandoned	
Apollonia Pontica	Black Sea coast of Bulgaria	Sozopol	Antheia, Apollonia, Apollonia Magna
Apsaros	Autonomous Republic of Adjara, Georgia	Gonio	Apsyrtos (Ἄψυρτος)
Argos	Peloponnese, Greece		
Arsuf	15 km north of Tel Aviv, Israel	abandoned	Arsur, Apollonia
Artanes	on the Danube, north west Bulgaria	Lom	Almus, Lom Palanka
Artemita	Babylonia, in the district of Apolloniatis (modern Iraq)	abandoned	Ἀρτεμίτα
Argyroupoli	northern Turkey	Gümüşhane	
Asine	Argolis, Greece	destroyed	
Asine	Messenia, Greece		
Asine	Laconia, southern Greece	Skoutari	
Asine	Cyprus	Asinou (Ασίνου)	
Asklepios	northern Turkey	İskilip	Iskila, Aesculapius, Andrapa, Andrapolis, Blocium, Bloacium, Neoclaudiopolis, Neopolis, İmad, Iskelib, İskelib, Direklibel
Aspendos	Antalya, southern Turkey	abandoned	
Assus	Çanakkale, Turkey	Behramkale	Assos
Astacus	western Turkey	İzmit	Nicomedea, Olbia
Athens	Attica, southern Greece		Athenai, Athena (Αθήνα)
Athmonia	11 km (7 mi) north of Athens, Greece	abandoned	
Aulon	Illyria, southern Albania	Vlorë	Aulona, Vlona, Valona
Aytos	eastern Bulgaria	Aytos	Aetos, Ajtos, Astos, Idos, Akvilia

== B ==
Ancient name	Location	Modern name	Also known as
Baris	south western Turkey	Isparta	
Beroea	Syria	Aleppo	
Berytos	Lebanon	Beirut	
Borysthenes	Ukrainian Black Sea coast	Berezan Island	Berezan'
Berge	Serres, Greece	Berge	Bergi
Boura	Achaea, Greece		
Bouthroton (Βουθρωτόν)	southern Albania	abandoned	Butrint, Bouthrotios (Βουθρώτιος), Buthrotum
Brauron	Attica, Greece	abandoned	Vravrona, Vravronas
Byblos	Lebanon	Byblos	Byblos, Gubla, Gebal, Jbeil
Byzantium	Bosphorus Strait, western Turkey	Istanbul	Constantinople, Byzantion
Bithynium	western Turkey	Bolu	Vithinion (Βιθύνιον), Bithynium, Claudiopolis

== C ==
Ancient name	Location	Modern name	Also known as
Callatis	Northern Dobruja, Romania	Mangalia	(Greek) Κάλλατις/Καλλατίς; (Turkish) Mankalya; Pangalla, Pancalia, Callata
Callipolis	Canakkale, Hellespont	Gelibolu	Kallipolis, Gallipoli
Calydon	Aetolia, Greece		
Caphyae	Arkadia, Greece	Chotoussa el:Χωτούσσα Αρκαδίας	Kaphyai
Capitolias	Jordan	Beit Ras	
Carystus	near modern Karystos, Euboea, Greece		
Cassandreia	Central Macedonia, Greece	Kassandreia	
Cebrene	Troad region of Turkey		Kebrene, Kevrin, Alexandria (Greek: Αλεξάνδρεια), Antiochia in Troad (Greek: Αντιόχεια της Τρωάδας)
Celenderis	Ancient Cilicia	Aydıncık	Kalenderis, Kelenderis
Chalcedon	opposite Byzantium, south of Scutari (modern Üsküdar)	Kadıköy	Chalkedon, Calchedon (Καλχήδων)
Chalcis	Euboea, Greece		Chalkida, Halkida, Halkis, Chalkis
Chamaizi	Crete, Greece	[Chamaizi is later Turkish name; ancient name unknown]	[Hill is known locally as Souvloto Mouri, ancient Minoan site but possibly not a city]
Charax Spasinu	southern Iraq	abandoned	Charax Spasinou, Charax Pasinu, Spasinu Charax Alexandria or Antiochia in Susiana
Chersonesos	near Sevastopol, Crimea		Korsun, Khersones, Chersonese, Chersonesos, Cherson
Chimaira	Chaonia, southern Albania	Himara, Himare	Cheimara, Cheimaera, Chimaera
Chios	in the island with the same name, Greece		
Chytri	Cyprus	Kythrea	Chytroi (Χύτροι)
Clazomenae	near İzmir, in Turkey	Kilizman	Clazomenae (Κλαζομεναί)
Cleonae	Argolis, Greece	Archaies Kleones	Kontostavlos
Cnidus	situated on Datça peninsula, southwestern Turkey	Tekir	Knidos (Κνίδος)
Colosse	Phrygia, Asia Minor (modern Turkey)	abandoned	Κολλοσσαί, Colossae, Chonae, Kona
Corcyra	Corfu island, Greece	Corfu	Κέρκυρα, Κόρκυρα, Corcyra, Corfu, Corfù, Kérkyra
Corcyra Melaena	Korčula island, Dalmatia (part of modern Croatia)	Korčula	Κόρκυρα Μέλαινα, Kórkyra Mélaina, Corcyra Nigra
Corcyra	Kirkuk Gοvernorate, Mesopotamia (modern Iraq)	Kirkuk	Kórkura, Kirkoúk
Corinth	Corinthia	Corinth	
Croton	Calabria, southern Italy	Crotone	Crotona, Cotrone
Cyme	Aeolis, Turkey	Namurt	Kymi, Phriconis
Cyrene	near Shahhat, Cyrenaica, Libya	abandoned	
Cythera	Ionian Islands, Greece		

== D ==
Ancient name	Location	Modern name	Also known as
Decelea (Δεκέλεια)	Attica, Greece		Dekeleia, Dekelia, Deceleia, Decelia, Tatoi
Delos	Cyclades, Greece		Dhilos (Δήλος)
Delphi	Mount Parnassus, Greece		
Demetrias	Magnesia, northern Greece	abandoned	Dimitrias
Dicaea	Chalcidice, northern Greece	abandoned	
Dicaea	Thrace	abandoned	
Dicaearchia	Campania, Italy	Pozzuoli	Pezzulo, Puteoli, Pozzuoli
Didyma	western Turkey	Didim	
Dion	Mount Olympus, Pieria, northern Greece	Dio (Δίο)	Dium
Dioscurias	Black Sea coast of Abkhazia, Georgia	Sukhumi	
Dodona	Epirus, Greece	abandoned	Dòdònè (Δωδώνη)
Dorylaion	near Eskişehir, Turkey	abandoned	Dorylaeum
Dura-Europos	Syria	abandoned	Dura Europos, Dura-Europus
Dyme	Achaea, Greece	abandoned	

== E ==
Ancient name	Location	Modern name	Also known as
Edessa	Pella, northern Greece		Voden, Vodine, Vodina, Vudena, Vodena
Edessa	Mesopotamia, southern Turkey	Şanlıurfa	Orrha, Orrhoa, Orhāy, Ourhoï, Urha, Ourha, Er Roha, Ar-Ruha, Orfa, Urfa, Ourfa, Sanli Urfa
Elateia	Phocis, Greece		
Eleusis	Attica, Greece		
Eleutherna	25 km southeast of Rethymno, Crete		Apollonia (Ἀπολλωνία)
Emporion	Catalonia, Spain	Empúries	Palaiapolis, Neapolis
Ephesus	Ionia, western Turkey	Efes	
Ephyra	Thesprotia, Greece		Kichyros - Κίχυρος
Epidamnos	coastal Albania	Durrës	Epidamnos (Επίδαμνος), Dyrhacchion (Δυρράχιον), Dyrrachium, Drach, Drač (Драч), Dıraç. Durazzo
Epidauros	Argolis, Greece		Epidavros
Eresos	Lesbos, Greece	Skala Eresou	
Eretria	Euboea, Greece	Eretria	Nea Psara (1823–1960)
Erythrae	Ionia, western Turkey	Ildiri	Erythrai (Ἐρυθραί), Litri
Eubea	Sicily	Licodia Eubea	

== G ==
Ancient name	Location	Modern name	Also known as
Gadara	Jordan	Um Qais	Gedaris
Gangra	Çankırı, Turkey	Çankırı	Germanicopolis (Γερμανικόπολις), Germanopolis (Γερμανόπολις), Changra, Kandari, Kanghari
Gaza	Gaza Strip, Palestine	Gaza	
Gela	southern Sicily, Italy	Gela	Terranova di Sicilia
Gerasa	Jordan	Jerash	Jarash, Ǧaraš
Golgi	Cyprus	Athienou	Golgoi (Γόλγοι)
Gonnos	Larissa regional unit, Greece	Gonnoi	Gonni (Γόννοι), Gonnus
Gorgippia	Black Sea coast of Krasnodar Krai, Russia	Anapa (Ана́па)	Sinda
Gournia	Crete, Greece		
Gortyn	Crete	destroyed	Gortyna (Γόρτυνα, Γόρτυς, or Γόρτυν)
Gythium	Laconia, Greece	Gytheio	Gýtheion (Γύθειον), Gythio, Githio, Yithion

== H ==
Ancient name	Location	Modern name	Also known as
Hagios Onouphrios	Crete, Greece	abandoned	
Hagia Triada	Crete, Greece	Ayias Triadha	
Halicarnassus	Caria, Turkey	Bodrum	Halikarnassós, Alikarnassós (Ἁλικαρνασσός), Halikarnas, Petronium (Πετρώνιον)
Halieis	Porto Heli, Argolis	abandoned	
Hammon (Note: The original ancient name of the Phoenician archaeological site of Umm al-Amad in Lebanon is uncertain, though scholars suggest it may have been Hammon (mentioned in Joshua 19:28) or Alexandrouskene.)	Lebanon	Umm al-Amad	
Hatra (Note: Not Greek-speaking but contributed to the Hellenic culture of the region through architecture such as Greco-Roman columns, Corinthian and Ionic capitals, classical architraves, triangular Greek pediments, classical friezes, and carved stone moldings. Religiously, the Greek deities of Heracles, Apollo, Poseidon, and Nike were worshipped in the city and statues of Hercules, Athena, Hermes, Apollo, Tyche, Nike, Aphrodite and Medusa Heads decorated the civic buildings.)	Nineveh, Iraq	abandoned	
Helike	Achaea, Greece	submerged	
Heliopolis	Lebanon	Baalbek	Heliopolis, Baalbek, Ἡλιούπολις
Hellespontos	Turkey	Dardanelles	
Helorus	south-east coast of Sicily	abandoned	Heloros, Helorum, Elorus, Ἔλωρος, Ἕλωρος, Eloro
Hēmeroskopeion	Province of Alicante, Spain	Dénia	Ἡμεροσκοπεῖον, Dianium
Heraclea Perinthus	western Turkey	Marmara Ereğli	Heraclea Thraciae, Heraclea (Ἡράκλεια), Heraclea
Heraclea	Lucania, Italy	abandoned	Anglona
Heraclea	Dalmatian Coast, Hvar	Hvar	Heraclea, Heracleia, Heraclia
Heraclea by Latmus	near Lake Bafa, Muğla Province, Turkey	Kapıkırı	Latmus, Λάτμος
Heraclea Cybistra	near Ereğli, Turkey	abandoned	
Heraclea Lyncestis	Pelagonia, near modern Bitola, North Macedonia	abandoned	Herakleia Lynkestis
Heraclea Minoa	near Montallegro, south coast of Sicily	abandoned	Hêrakleia Minôia, Rhachlôtês, Heracliensis
Heraclea Pontica	Bithynia, Turkey	Karadeniz Ereğli	
Heraclea Sintica	Rupite, Bulgaria	abandoned	
Heraclea Trachis	Central Greece, Greece	Heraclea	Trachis, Heraclea Trachinia
Hermione	Peloponnese, Greece	Ermioni (Ερμιόνη)	
Hermonassa	Taman peninsula, Krasnodar Krai, Russia	Tmutarakan (Тмутаракань)	
Hierapetra	Southern Crete, Greece	Ierapetra	
Hierapolis	Pamukkale, western Turkey	abandoned	Hierapolis (Ἱεράπολις)
Himera	northern coast of Sicily	abandoned, site subsequently re-settled	Thermae, Therma, Thermae Himerenses
Histria	Black Sea coast of Romania	abandoned	Istros (Ιστριη)
Hubla Minor	Sicily, Italy	abandoned	
Hubla Gereatis	southern slope of Mount Etna, Sicily	abandoned	
Hubla Heraea	Hyblaean Mountains, south-eastern Sicily	Ragusa	Hibla, Heresium, Rogos, Rakkusa
Hyele	Campania, Italy	Velia	Elea

== I ==
Ancient name	Location	Modern name	Also known as
Ialysos	Rhodes		
Iasus	Caria, south-west Turkey	abandoned	Iassus (Iασoς, Iασσoς), Askem, Asýn Kalessi
Idalium	Cyprus	Dali	Idalion (Ιδάλιον)
Imbros	Greek island in northern Aegean Sea	Gökçeada	İmroz, Imvros (Ίμβρος)
Iolcus	Thessaly, eastern Greece		Iolkos (Ιωλκός)
Issa	Vis, Croatia	Vis	Vis, Lissa, Issa (Ἴσσα)
Itanos	North-eastern Crete	Erimopolis	
Ithaca	island in the Ionian Sea	Ithaka, Ithaki, (Ιθάκη)	

== J ==
Ancient name	Location	Modern name	Also known as
Juktas	Crete, Greece		

== K ==
Ancient name	Location	Modern name	Also known as
Kaiete	Campania, Italy	Gaeta	Caiete, Caieta, Kaieta
Kallipolis	Caria, south-western Turkey		
Kallipolis	Hellespont, north-western Turkey	Gelibolu	Gallipoli
Kallipolis	Apulia, southern Italy	Gallipoli	Callipolis
Kalos Limen	Crimea, Ukraine	Chornomorske	
Kamares	Crete, Greece		
Kameiros	Rhodes, Greece		
Kannia	Crete, Greece		
Kamarina	south-eastern coast of Sicily	abandoned	Camarina, Kamerina
Kasmenai	Hyblaean Mountains, south-eastern Sicily	abandoned (Buscemi)	Casmenae, Casmene, Kasmenai, Kasmene, Κασμέναι (Kasménai), Κασμένη (Kasménē)
Katane	east coast of Sicily	Catania	Katánē (Κατάνη), Catăna, Catĭna, Balad-al-Fil, Medinat-al-Fil, Wadi Musa, Qataniyah
Kerkinitida	Crimea, Ukraine	Yevpatoria	Eupatoria (Євпаторія, Евпатория), Kezlev, Kerkinitis, Gözleve
Kepoi	Taman Peninsula, Krasnodar Krai, Russia	abandoned, submerged	Cepoi (Κήποι, Кепы)
Kimmerikon	Kerch Peninsula, Crimea	abandoned	Cimmericum Crimea
Kios	Sea of Marmara, Bithynia, north-western Turkey	abandoned	Cius-Kios (Kίος, Kείος), Keios, Prusa, Prusias, Prusias ad Mare
Klazomenai	Ionia, Western Turkey	Urla	Clazomenae
Knidos	Caria		
Knossos	Crete	abandoned	Knossus, Cnossus (Κνωσός)
Kommos	Crete, Greece	Kommos is the modern name; ancient name unknown	Komos, Komo
Korinthos	Korinthia, Greece	Archea Korinthos	
Kos	island of the Dodecanese, off Bodrum		Cos (Κως), İstanköy, Coo, Stanchio
Kourion	Cyprus		Curium, Curias (Κούριον)
Kúmē	Campania, Italy	abandoned	
Kydonia	Crete, Greece	Chania	Cydonia
Kynos	Boeotia, Greece	Livanates	Cynus, Kunos
Kyrenia	Cyprus		Girne

== L ==
Ancient name	Location	Modern name	Also known as
Lamia	central Greece		Zetounion (Ζητούνιον), Zitouni (Ζητούνι), Zirtounion, Zitonion, Girton, El Cito
Lampsacus	Troad, Turkey	Lapseki	Lampsakos (Λάμψακος), Pityusa, Pityussa, Pituousa (Πιτυουσα), Pituoussa (Πιτυουσσα)
Laodicea in Syria	Syrian coast	Latakia	Laodicea ad Mare, Latakiyah, Al-Ladhiqiyah, Laodikeia, Laodiceia, Lazkiye, Laodicea ad Mare
Laodicea on the Lycus	Lydia, Turkey	destroyed	Diospolis, Rhoas, Claudiolaodicea, Laodicea ad Lycum, Laodiceia, Laodikeia
Laodicea in Media	western Iran	Nahavand	Laodicea in Persis, Antiochia Nahavand, Nahāvand (نهاوند), Nahavend, Nahawand, Nehavand, Nihavand, Nehavend, Mah-Nahavand, Laodicea (Λαοδικεια), Ladhiqiyya, Laodiceia, Laodikeia, Laodicea in Media, Antiochia in Persis, Antiochia of Chosroes (Αντιόχεια του Χοσρόη), Antiochia in Media (Αντιόχεια της Μηδίας), Nemavand, Niphaunda
Laodicea Combusta	Lycaonia, Turkey	abandoned	Laodicea Catacecaumene, Laodiceia, Laodikeia, Laodikeia Katakekaumenê, Claudiolaodicea
Laodicea ad Libanum	Coele-Syria	abandoned	Laodiceia, Laodikeia, Cabrosa, Scabrosa, Cabiosa Laodiceia
Laodicea	Arcadia, Greece		Laodiceia, Laodikeia
Laodicea Pontica	Pontus, north-eastern Turkey		Laodiceia and Laodikeia
Laodicea	Mesopotamia, Iraq	lost	Laodikeia, Laodiceia
Laodicea in Phoenicia	Lebanon	Beirut	Laodicea in Canaan, Berytus
Lapithos	Cyprus		Lapta
Larissa	Thessaly, Greece		Lárisa
Larissa	Troad, Turkey	abandoned	
Lato	Crete, Greece		
Laüs	Lucania, southern Italy	abandoned	Laus, Laos (Λᾶος)
Lebena	Crete, Greece		
Lefkada	island in the Ionian Sea		
Lekhaion	Corinthia, Greece		
Leibethra	Central Macedonia, near modern Skotina, Greece		
Leontinoi	southeastern Sicily	Lentini	Lintini, Leontinoi, Leontini and Leontium
Lepreum	Elis, Greece	abandoned	Lepreon, Lepreus
Lessa	Epidauria, Greece	abandoned	
Lilaea	Boeotia, Greece	Lilaea	
Lindus	Rhodes	Lindos	
Lissus	Crete, Greece	abandoned	
Lychnidos	Southwestern Region, North Macedonia	Ohrid	
Epizephyrian Locris	Calabria, southern Italy	destroyed	Locri

== M ==
Ancient name	Location	Modern name	Also known as
Madytos	Eceabat (Town)	abandoned	Maitos, Madyta,
Magnesia on the Maeander	Ionia, western Turkey, on the Maeander river	abandoned	Magnesia ad Maeandrum
Magnesia ad Sipylum	Lydia, western Turkey	Manisa	Magnesia on the Sipylum
Malia	Crete, Greece		
Mantineia	Arcadia, Greece	abandoned	Mantinea, Antigonia (Αντιγόνεια)
Marathon	Attica, Greece		Marathónas (Μαραθώνας), Marathōn (Μαραθών)
Marmara	Balıkesir, Western Turkey	Marmara	
Maroneia	Maroneia, Eastern Thrace	Maroneia	Maronya
Masis	Epidauria, Greece	Kranidi	
Massalia	southern France	Marseille	Massilia
Megalopolis	Arcadia, Greece		Sinanou (Σινάνο)
Megara	Attica, Greece		
Megara Hublaea	near Augusta, eastern Sicily	destroyed	
Mesembria	Black Sea coast of Bulgaria	Nesebar	Menebria, Mesimvria (Μεσήμβρια), Mesimvria
Messene	southern Greece		
Metapontum	Lucania, southern Italy	abandoned	Metapontium (Μεταπόντιον)
Methana	Epidauria, Greece	Vathy	
Methone	Central Macedonia, Greece	abandoned	
Methone	Messenia, southern Greece		Mothoni (Μοθώνη), Modon
Methumna	Lesbos, in the Aegean Sea		Mithymna (Μήθυμνα), Molyvos, Molivos
Miletos	Aydin, Turkey, Balat	abandoned	Milētos, Millawanda, Milawata, Miletus, Milet
Misenum	Campania, Italy	Miseno	
Mochlos	Crete, Greece		
Monastiraki	Crete, Greece	abandoned	
Morgantina	central Sicily	abandoned	Murgantia, Morgantium, Μοργάντιον, Μοργαντίνη, Murgentia, Morgentia
Mulai	Sicily, Italy	Milazzo	
Mukenai	north-eastern Argolis, near Mykines	abandoned	Mykēnē, Mykēnai
Mylasa	Caria, south-western Turkey	Milas	
Myndus	Caria, western Turkey	Gümüşlük	Myndos (Μύνδος)
Myonia	Phocis, Greece	Agia Efthymia	Myania, Mynia
Myra	Lycia, Turkey	Demre	Kale
Myrmekion	Crimea, Ukraine	abandoned	Myrmēkion (Μυρμηκιων, Мирмекий)
Mutilene	Lesbos, in the Aegean Sea		
Myos	Ionia, Anatolia	abandoned	

== N ==
Ancient name	Location	Modern name	Also known as
Nauplíos	Nafplio, Argolis	Nafpion	Nafpio, Nauplia, Navplion, Naupliē, Nauplia, Náfplion, Anáplion, Anáplia, Napoli di Romania, Mora Yenişehir, Anabolı, Yeni şehir, Náfplion
Naucratis	Nile Delta, Egypt		Naukratis (Ναύκρατις)
Naupactus	Aetolia-Acarnania, Greece		Nafpaktos (Ναύπακτος, Έπαχτος), Naupactos, İnebahtı, Lepanto
Naxos	Crete	abandoned	
Naxos	Sicily	Giardini Naxos	Giaddini
Neapoli	northern Greece	Kavala	Christoupolis, Morunets
Neapolis	Pallene, Chalcidice, Greece	Polychrono	Polyhrono, Polichrono, Polihrono (Πολύχρονο), Polyhronon, Polihronon
Neapolis	Apulia, Italy	Polignano a Mare	
Neapolis	Campania, Italy	Naples	Napoli, Napule
Nemea	Archaia Nemea, Argolis	abandoned	
Nicaea	Bithynia, north-western Turkey	Iznik	Ancore, Helicore, Antigoneia (Αντιγόνεια), Nikaia, Nicæa
Nicaea	southern France	Nice	Niça, Nissa, Nizza, Nizza Marittima
Nicopolis	Epirus, Greece	abandoned	Actia Nicopolis, Palaia Preveza
Nikonion	Dniester Estuary near Ukrainian Black Sea coast	Roksolany	
Nirou Hani	Crete, Greece	Minoan city	
Nymphaion	Crimea, Ukraine		Nymphaeum
Nymphaion	Illyria, Albania		Nymphaeum
Nysa	western Turkey	abandoned	

== O ==
Ancient name	Location	Modern name	Also known as
Oenoe (Οινόη)	northern Turkey	Ünye	Oene
Oenoe	Argolis, Greece		Oene
Oenoe	Attica, Greece		Oene
Oenus	Laconia, Greece		
Odessos	coastal Bulgaria	Varna	
Olbia	Sardinia		Civita, Terranova Pausania
Olbia	Ukrainian Black Sea coast	abandoned	Pontic Olbia, Olvia
Olous	near Elounda, Crete	drowned	Olus (Ὄλους, Ὄλουλις)
Olympia	Elis, Greece	abandoned	Olympí'a (Ολυμπία), Olýmpia (Ολύμπια), Olimpia, Olimbia
Olynthus	Chalcidice, northern Greece	destroyed	
Opus	Boeotia, Greece	Atalanti	Opous
Orchomenus	Arcadia, Greece	Orchomenos near Levidi	Kalpaki (Médiéval name)
Orchomenus	Boeotia, Greece		
Oricos	Illyria/Epirus, near Vlorë, Albania	abandoned	
Orestias	Turkish Thrace	abandoned	
Oreus	northern Euboea		
Oropus	Attica, Greece		Oropos (Ωρωπός)
Onchesmos	Epirus, southern Albania	Sarandë	Anchiasmos, Άγιοι Σαράντα, Agioi Saranda, Turkish: Aya Sarandi

== P ==
Ancient name	Location	Modern name	Also known as
Pactye	Thracian Chersonesos, Turkey	abandoned	
Pagasae	Magnesia, central Greece	Platanos, central Greece	
Palaikastro	Crete, Greece	Minoan city	
Palmyra (Note: Linguistically, the city used Koine Greek extensively as a commercial and diplomatic language. Hundreds of Palmyrene inscriptions were also explicitly bilingual (Aramaic and Greek).Architecturally, Palmyra adopted monumental Hellenistic structural forms such as the Great Colonnade and orthogonal layouts.)	Syria	Tadmor	
Pandosia	Epirus, Greece	abandoned	
Pandosia	Bruttium, Italy	castellibero	castrofranco
Pandosia	Lucania, Italy	abandoned	
Panticapaeum	Taurica, eastern Crimea, Ukraine	Kerch	Παντικάπαιον
Paphos	Cyprus		
Parium	Mysia, Hellespont	Kemer (Town)	Parion, Adrasteia, Adrastea
Paros	Greek island in Aegean Sea	Paros	Plateia, Pactia, Demetrias, Strongyli, Hyria, Hyleessa, Minoa, Cabarnis
Parthenope	Port of Neapolis, Campania	Naples	
Patrae	Achaea, Greece	Patrai	Pátra (Πάτρα) Patrae
Pavlopetri	Laconia, Greece	submerged	
Pegai	Megaris, Greece	abandoned	
Peiraieús	Attica, Greece	Piraeus	Peiraiás, Peiraieús (Πειραιεύς)
Pella	Central Macedonia, Greece	abandoned	
Pella (Jordan)	Jordan	Tabaqat Fahl	Pihilum, Berenike, Philippeia
Percote	Asian Hellespont, Northeast of Troy	abandoned	Percope
Perga	15 km east of Antalya, Turkey	abandoned	
Pergamum	Mysia, Turkey	Bergama	Pergamon (Πέργαμος)
Petra (Note: Not Greek-speaking but contributed to the Hellenic culture of the region through architecture with carved elaborate Hellenistic designs directly into sandstone cliffs which feature classical Corinthian columns, broken pediments, and central tholoi inspired by the Greek architecture of Alexandria. The city was also laid out with traditional Hellenistic and Greco-Roman urban features, including a grand colonnaded street, public baths, a monumental nymphaeum, and a large open-air theater carved into the rock. Coinage minted also featured Greek legends, royal portraits in the style of Seleucid kings, and classical imagery such as the goddess Nike. Facades of the buildings also features figures like the Greek twin gods Castor and Pollux, winged Victories, and a syncretic figure combining the Egyptian goddess Isis with Tyche, the Greek goddess of fortune. The city also hosted one Ancient Olympic winner, Polemon of Petra, which was strictly restricted to freeborn, Greek males.)	Jordan	abandoned	Raqmu
Petsofas	Crete, Greece	Minoan city	
Phaistos	Crete, Greece		
Phálēron	Attica, Greece	Palaio Faliro	Phaleron, Phalerum
Phanagoria	Cimmerian Bosporus, Ukraine	abandoned	Matrega
Pharae			
Pharae (Messenia)			
Pharnacia	northern Turkey	Giresun	
Pharos	Croatian island	Hvar	Hvor, For, Pharina, Lesina
Phaselis	Lycia, Turkey	abandoned	
Phasis	Samegrelo-Zemo Svaneti, Georgia	Poti	
Pithekussa	island in Tyrrhenian Sea, Italy	Ischia	
Philadelphia	Jordan	Amman	
Philippi	Eastern Macedonia and Thrace, near Kavala, Greece	Filippoi	
Philippopolis	southern Bulgaria	Plovdiv	Pulpudeva (reconstructed Thracian, uncertain), Eumolpias, Philippoupoli, Philippoupolis (Φιλιππούπολη, Φιλιππούπολις), Trimontium, Paldin (Пълдин). Plavdiv (Плъвдив), Filibe
Platanos	Crete, Greece	Minoan city	
Phlius	Argolid, Greece	abandoned	
Pherae	Thessaly, Greece	abandoned	
Pherae (Aetolia)			
Phocaea	western Turkey	Foça	Phokaia (Φώκαια)
Phoenice	Chaonia, southern Albania	Finiq	
Pinara	Lycia, Turkey	abandoned	Pilleñni (τὰ Πίναρα)
Pisa	Elis, Greece		
Pitane	Çandarlı, Turkey	abandoned	
Pitiunt	Abkhazia, Black Sea coast	Pitsunda	Bichvinta, Pezonda
Pixous	Campania, Italy	Policastro Bussentino	Pixunte
Plataea	Boeotia, Greece	destroyed	Plataeae
Poseidonia	Campania, Italy	Paestum	Paestum
Potidaea	Chalcidice, Greece	Nea Poteidaia	Potidaia (Ποτίδαια), Potidea
Priapus	Canakkale, western Turkey	Karabiga	
Priene	Ionia, western Turkey	abandoned	
Prousa	north-western Turkey	Bursa	Prussa (Προύσα), Brusa
Pseira	Crete, Greece	Minoan city	
Psychro	Crete, Greece	Minoan city	
Pteleum	Thessaly, Greece	destroyed	
Pydna	Central Macedonia, Greece	Pydna	Púdna (Πύδνα)
Pylos	western Peloponnese, Greece		Pílos (Πύλος), Navarino, Avarino (Αβαρίνος), Zonklon, Anavarin, Neokastron, Avarmus, Abarinus, Albarinos, Albaxinus, Avarinos, Coryphasium, Iverin, Nelea, Port de Jonc, Porto Giunco, Zunchio.
Pyrgos	Black Sea coast of Bulgaria	Burgas	
Pyrgos	Northern Crete, Greece	Minoan city	

== R ==
Ancient name	Location	Modern name	Also known as
Rhamnus	northern Attica, Greece	abandoned	Rhamnous
Rhegion (Ρήγιoν)	"toe of Italy", Calabria, southern Italy	Reggio Calabria	Erythrà (Ερυθρά), Rhegium Julium
Rhithymna	Northern Crete, Greece	Rethymon	
Rhode	Catalonia, Spain	Roses, Girona	
Rhodes	Rhodes, Greece		Ródos (Ρόδος),
Rhypes, (Ῥύπες)	Achaia, Greece	destroyed	
Rizinia	Crete	abandoned	Prinias, Rize, Rhizenia

== S ==
Ancient name	Location	Modern name	Also known as
Salamis	Cyprus	abandoned	
Same (Σάμη)	island in the Ionian Sea, Greece		
Samos	in the island with the same name, Greece		
Scyllaeum	Calabria, Italy	Scilla	
Scolacium (Σκυλλήτιον)	near Catanzaro, Calabria, Italy	Squillace	
Selinus	south-west coast of Sicily, Italy	abandoned-Marinella di Selinunte	Selinunte
Seleucia Pieria (Σελεύκεια Πιερία)	south-eastern Turkey	Çevlik	Seleukia Pieria, Seleukia
Seleucia ad Tigrim	central Iraq	abandoned	Seleucia, Seleucia-on-Tigris, Seleucia on the Tigris
Seleucia-on-the-Hedyphon	Khuzestan, Iran	abandoned	Seleuceia, Seleukeia; formerly Soloke or Soloce, Sodome, and Sele, also Surak
Semasus	Paphlagonia, northern Turkey	Amasra	Cromna, Amastris
Sestos	Eceabat, Turkey, North of Abydos		Sestus
Scidrus (Σκίδρος)	Lucania, Italy	location uncertain	
Sicyon (Σικυών)	northern Peloponnese, Greece	abandoned	
Side	Pamphylia, Turkey	abandoned	Eski Adalia, Old Antalya
Sidon	Lebanon	Sidon	Σιδών, Sidon, Saïda
Siteia	Crete, Greece		
Sinope (Σινώπη)	Paphlagonia, northern Turkey	Sinop	
Siris	Central Macedonia, Greece	Serres	Serrai (Katharevousa), Serras (local dialect, archaic form), Sirra (Roman era and Theopompus), Serez or Siroz (in Turkish), Ser (in Serbian and Bulgarian), Syar (in Bulgarian)
Sklavokampos	Crete, Greece		
Smyrna	near İzmir, western Turkey	abandoned	Old Smyrna
Soli	Cyprus	abandoned	Soloi
Sozopolis	Pisidia, Turkey	abandoned	Apollonia
Sparta	southern part of the Peloponnese, Greece	Sparti	Lakedaimon (Λακεδαίμων), Lakedaimonia (Λακεδαιμωνία), Σπάρτα, Σπάρτη, Spartē.
Stagirus	Chalcidice, Greece	abandoned	Stageira (Στάγειρα), Stagira (Στάγιρα), Stagiros (Στάγιρος), Stageiros (Στάγειρος)
Stratos	Western Greece	Stratos	
Stymphalos	Corinthia, Greece	Stymfalia	
Sybaris	near Sibari, Gulf of Taranto, Italy	destroyed	
Syrakousai	east-coast of Sicily, Italy	Syracuse	Siracusai, Aretusa.

== T ==
Ancient name	Location	Modern name	Also known as
Taras (Τάρᾱς)	southern Italy	Taranto	Tarentum, Tarantas (Τάραντας)
Tanagra	Boeotia, Greece		Poimandria
Tanais	north-eastern Sea of Azov, Russia		Tánaïs (Τάναϊς)
Tauromenion (Ταυρομένιον)	east coast of Sicily	Taormina	Taurmina, Tauromenium
Tegea	Arcadia, Greece	Alea	
Temnos	Aeolis, Turkey	abandoned	
Tenedos	Turkish island in northern Aegean Sea	Bozcaada	Bozca ada, Tenedhos (Τένεδος)
Tenea	Corinthia, Peloponnese	Municipal unit of Tenea	
Teos (Τέως)	Ionia, western Turkey	abandoned	Teo
Termessos (Τερμησσός)	Ionia, western Turkey	abandoned	Termissós
Thapsos	Sicily, Italy	abandoned	
Thassos (Θάσος)	Eastern Macedonia and Thrace, Greece	Thassos	Limenas, Λιμένας
Thebes	Boeotia, Greece	Thēbai (Θῆβαι), Thiva (Θήβα)	
Theodosia (Θεοδοσία)	Crimea, Ukraine	Feodosia (Феодосія, Феодосия)	Kefe, Feodosia
Therma	Mygdonia, Central Macedonia, Greece	Thessaloniki	Therme (Θέρμα, Θέρμη)
Thespiae	Boeotia, Greece	abandoned	Thespiai (Θεσπιαι)
Thronium	Illyria/Epirus, near Vlorë, Albania	abandoned	Thronium
Thoricus	southern Attica, Greece	abandoned	Thorico
Thurii (Θούριοι)	Magna Graecia, southern Italy	abandoned	Thurium (Θούριον), Copia, Copiae, Turios, Thurio Magna Graecia
Thyreum			
Thyria	South of İzmir, Turkey	Tire	
Tiruns	Argolis, Peloponnese	abandoned	
Tithoraea	Boeotia, Greece	Kato Tithorea	
Tomis	Black Sea coast of Romania	Constanţa	Konstantia, Köstence
Toróne	Chalcidice, Greece	Toroni	
Tragurion	Dalmatian coast, Croatia	Trogir	Traù, Tragurium, Trau
Trapeze	Crete, Greece		
Trapezus, Arcadia	Black Sea coast of north-eastern Turkey	Trabzon	Trapezounta (Τραπεζούντα)
Tripolis (Τρίπολις)	Lebanon	Tripoli	
Tripolis (Τρίπολις)	Libya	Tripoli	
Tripolis (Τρίπολις)	Pontus, north-eastern Turkey	Tirebolu	Ischopolis
Tripolis (Τρίπολις)	Thessaly, Greece		Tripolis Larisaia
Tripolis (Τρίπολις)	Phrygia	abandoned	Neapolis, Apollonia, Antoninopolis
Troizen (Τροιζήν)	northeastern Peloponnese, Greece	Troizina	Trizina
Troliton	Sicily, Italy	abandoned	
Troy	Dardanelles, north-eastern Turkey	Truva	Troia (Τροία), Ilion (Ἴλιον), Īlium, Wilusa, Truwisa, Hisarlık
Tylissos	Crete, Greece		
Tyras	Dniester Estuary near Ukrainian Black Sea coast	Bilhorod-Dnistrovskyi	Maurokastron, Bilhorod, Cetatea Albă, Moncastro, Akkerman
Tyros	Lebanon	Tyre	Τύρος, Tyre, Sur
Tyritake (Τυριτάκη)	Crimea, Cimmerian Bosporus	abandoned	

== V ==
Ancient name	Location	Modern name	Also known as
Vasiliki	Minoan city in Crete, Greece		
Vathypetros	Minoan city in Crete, Greece		

== Z ==
Ancient name	Location	Modern name	Also known as
Zakynthos	Zante		
Zakros	Crete, Greece	Minoan city	Zakro
Zankle	Strait of Messina, Sicily, Italy	Messina	Messene, Messana

== See also ==
- Greek colonisation
- Adjectival and demonymic forms of regions in Greco-Roman antiquity
- List of cities in ancient Epirus
- Greek cities in Thrace and Dacia
- Greek cities in Illyria
- Towns of ancient Greece
- List of cities in ancient Acarnania
- Regions of ancient Greece
