= Marathusa =

Marathusa or Marathousa (Μαραθούσα), also known as Moratusa or Moratousa, was an inland city of ancient Crete, mentioned by Pliny the Elder and Pomponius Mela. It was probably located near Cydonia.

Its site is unlocated.
