= Franz Josef Ritter von Buß =

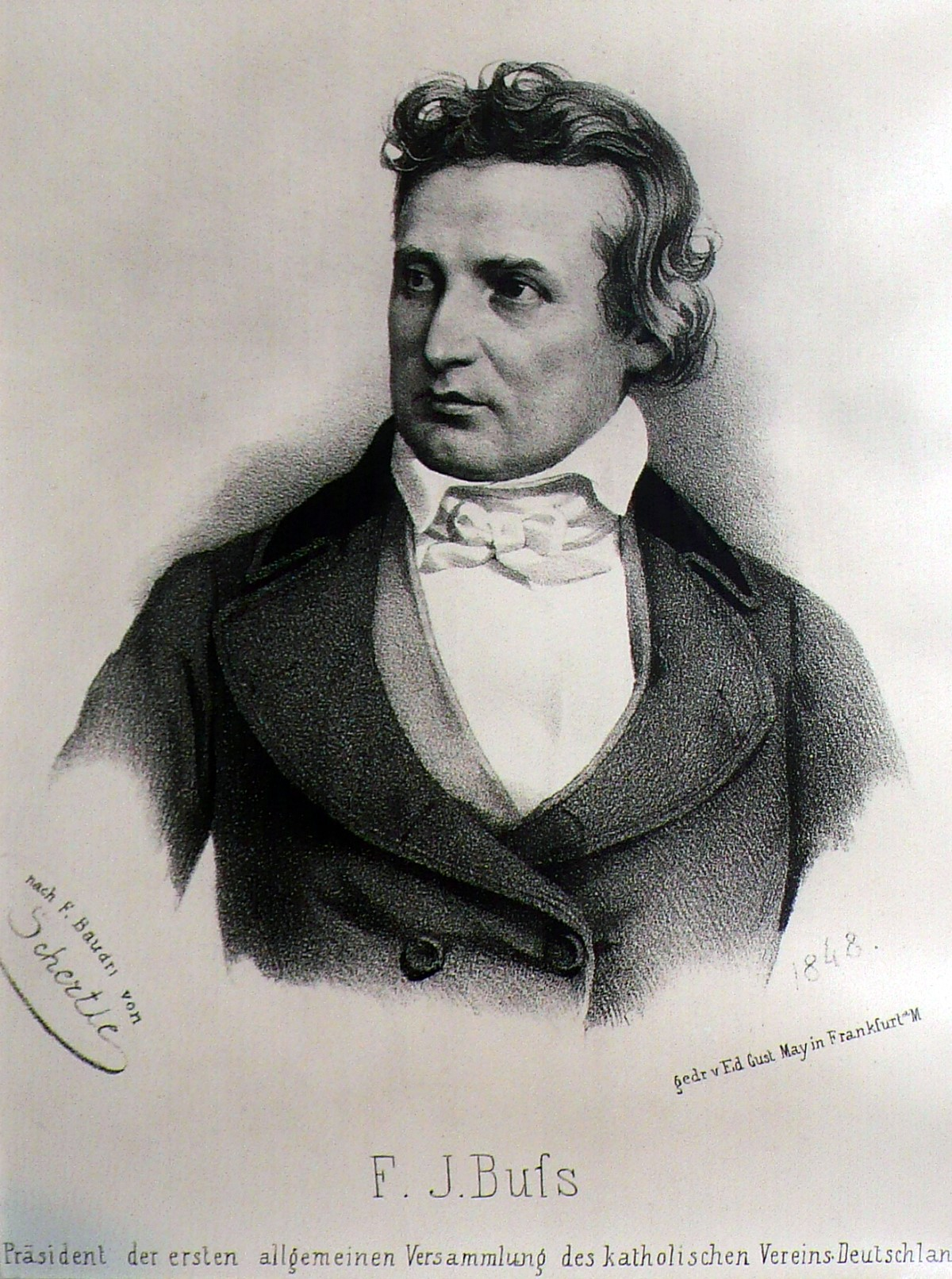
Franz Josef Ritter von Buß.

Franz Joseph, Ritter von Buss (23 March 1803, Zell am Harmersbach – 31 January 1878, Freiburg im Breisgau) was a German Roman Catholic jurist, activist and politician.

== Life ==
Buss was the oldest of seven siblings in all. His father was a master tailor and mayor of Zell. He attended high school in Offenburg. He studied at the University of Freiburg, where he studied philosophy, law, and medicine. After short stays at the Universities of Bonn and Göttingen, he returned to Freiburg, and was awarded doctorates in philosophy (1822) and jurisprudence (1828), and also medicine in Basle in 1831. While studying in Freiburg, he became a member of a Burschenschaft (student organisation). He was appointed a professor of law in Freiburg in 1833 on an "extraordinary" basis, and in 1836 as a full professor; and additionally in 1844 for ecclesiastical law. This was linked to an appointment as a counsellor at the royal court. He remained a professor there until his death. He was an editor and publisher of various Catholic newspapers, founder of Catholic societies, and had a significant lay position in the church, inter alia as an archiepiscopal commissioner. In the year before his death, he suffered from severe depressions, and for several months he was immobile while being treated at the healing centre of Illenau.

== Political activity ==
In 1837, at the age of 34, Buss was elected to the Lower House of the Grand Duchy of Baden. His speech on 25 April 1837 is reckoned as the first speech on social policy in a German parliament. He realised the negative consequences of industrialisation for the workers, and proposed measures for state assistance for them, such as limits to working hours, accident insurance, and state help for business start-ups. However such proposals were not achieved by the House. He was a member from 1837–40 and 1846–48.

In the 1840s he was active in promoting the political freedom of the Catholic Church, a uniform customs system, and closer commercial union between the States of Germany. Buss met from the beginning a hostile majority, and he was reproached in open Parliament with errors and false steps of his youth. Unable to make the least impression, he resigned his seat. Elected again in 1846, Buss opposed the "Deutschkatholicismus" of Ronge. This brought out his opponents in full force. Extensive petitions in his favor compelled the Government to dissolve the Parliament, but the new election brought no improvement. Buss was the only champion of the Catholic Church in the Lower House, whilst in the Upper House the weight of the opposition fell on Baron von Andlau and his colleague Hirscher.

He introduced the Sisters of Charity into Baden; transformed his own house into an ecclesiastical college; during the famine of the winter of 1846, he fed thousands of starving people in the Black Forest; and he organized the Catholics politically and formed them into societies. In 1848 Buss presided over the first general assembly of the German Catholic associations (Katholikentag) in Mainz. He represented Ahaus-Steinfurt in the German Parliament at Frankfurt. There, as in the Erfurt Union Parliament, where he was the leader of the Greater-Germany Party, he favoured Austria as against Prussia. When opposition to the Catholic Church in Baden developed into open hostility, Buss was on the side of the archbishop, Hermann von Vicari.

Besides a modern language club of which he was the founder and president, he gave much of his time to creating at Freiburg a centre for the comparative study of European legislation and jurisprudence. He soon found, however, that the means of international correspondence were inadequate to the enterprise. Some of the material collected appeared in book form (1835–46), the sole fruit of the scheme. He was elected for the third time to the Baden Landtag when the Concordat between Baden and the Holy See was in jeopardy. He at once organized a popular deputation to the sovereign, comprising representatives from all the parishes of Baden. But the old opposition prevented the demonstration, invalidated his election, and ejected him from the Landtag, and finally, at the next election, his constituents abandoned him. Buss now, more than ever, turned his face toward Austria. During the Austro-Italian War he was active at the head of an association for the relief of the German prisoners; in acknowledgment of his services the emperor conferred on him the Order of the Iron Crown. He also organized at Vienna a great manifestation in favor of the temporal power of the pope, for which he was decorated by Pope Pius IX with the Order of Gregory the Great.

Under the strain of work and disappointments, Buss broke down completely in 1866. He recovered, but events had meanwhile advanced rapidly and his hopes for the hegemony of Austria were crushed. He remained averse to the new German Empire. Elected a fourth time to the Lower House of Baden, Buss maintained his former reputation. In 1874 he was elected to the Reichstag by a very large vote and took his seat with the Centre Party. In 1877, after the death of his youngest child, he withdrew from public life and died soon afterwards.

== Works ==
The "Methodology of Canon Law" (1842), the "Influence of Christianity on Law and State" (1844), the "Difference between Catholic and Protestant Universities in Germany" (1846), the "German Union and the Love of Prussia", the "Re-establishment of Canon Law", and the "Defence of the Jesuits" (1853) appeared in rapid succession, each to do the work of the hour. The 1855 "Life of St. Thomas of Canterbury" was dedicated it to Archbishop Vicari. His Winfrid-Bonifacius was published posthumously, in 1880, by Rudolf von Scherer.
