= Naxos (disambiguation) =

Naxos is a Greek island.

Naxos may also refer to:

== Places ==
Greece

- Naxos (city), a town and former municipality on the island of Naxos
- Naxos (regional unit), a Greek government division
- Naxos and Lesser Cyclades, one of two municipalities within the regional unit
- Naxos Island National Airport
- Duchy of Naxos (Duchy of the Archipelago), a maritime state created by the Venetians between 1207–1579
- Naxos (Crete), an ancient Greek city in Crete

Italy

- Naxos (Sicily), an ancient Greek city in Sicily
  - Giardini Naxos, a modern city on the site of the above

== Battles ==
- Siege of Naxos (499 BC), an engagement in the Cyclades during the Greco-Persian Wars
- Siege of Naxos (490 BC), an engagement in the Cyclades during the Greco-Persian Wars
- Battle of Naxos (376 BC), an engagement in the Cyclades during the Boeotian War

== Music ==
- Naxos (company), a music and audio publishing company
- Naxos Quartets, a series of string quartets by Peter Maxwell Davies
- Ariadne auf Naxos, an opera by Richard Strauss

== Other ==
- Naxos (mythology), eponym of the island Naxos
- Naxos disease, Arrhythmogenic right ventricular dysplasia
- Naxos radar detector, a German World War II countermeasure
