= Artemision =

Artemision may refer to:

- Temple of Artemis in Ephesus, one of the Seven Wonders of the Ancient World
- Artemisium, another name of the ancient city of Hēmeroskopeion
- Artemisium, a cape in northern Euboea, Greece
  - Artemision Bronze
  - Battle of Artemisium
