= Hagios Onouphrios =

Hagios Onouphrios was an ancient Minoan city in southern Crete, on the Plain of Messara, a few miles west of Kannia and Gortyn.

== See also ==
- List of ancient Greek cities
