= Apollothemis =

Apollothemis (Ancient Greek: Ἀπολλόθεμις) can refer to a number of different men of classical antiquity:

- Apollothemis was a historian of ancient Greece, whom Plutarch made use of in his life of Lycurgus.
- Apollothemis, father of Diogenes of Apollonia
- Apollothemis of Smyrna, son of Pytheas, who is named in a subscription list at Smyrna.
- Apollothemis of Prokonnesos, Athenian exile who was likely the leader of the pro-Athenian faction in Prokonnesos. He may have died in exile after Prokonnesos was absorbed into Cyzicus in 362.
