= Apamea (Babylonia) =

Ancient city

Coordinates: 34°13′N 43°52′E

Apamea or Apameia (Greek: Απάμεια) was an ancient city – and possibly two ancient cities lying close together – of Mesopotamia mentioned by Stephanus of Byzantium and Pliny as situated near the Tigris near the confluence of the Euphrates, the precise location of which is still uncertain, but it lies in what later is Iraq.

Stephanus (s. v. Apameia) describes Apamea as in the territory of Mesene, and surrounded by the Tigris, at which place, that is Apamea, or it may mean, in which country, Mesene, the Tigris is divided; on the right part there flows round a river Sellas, and on the left the Tigris, having the same name with the large one. It does not appear what writer he is copying; but it may be Arrian.

Pliny says of the Tigris, that around Apamea, a town of Mesene, on this side of the Babylonian Seleucia, 125 miles, the Tigris being divided into two channels, by one channel it flows to the south and to Seleucia, washing all along Mesene; by the other channel, turning to the north at the back of the same nation (Mesene), it divides the plains called Cauchae: when the waters have united again, the river is called Pasitigris. There was a place at or near Seleucia called Coche; and the site of Seleucia is below Baghdad. These are the only points in the description that are certain. It seems difficult to explain the passage of Pliny, or to determine the probable site of Apamea.

It cannot be at Korna, as some suppose, e.g., Ptolemy, where the Tigris and Euphrates meet, for both Stephanus and Pliny place Apamea at the point where the Tigris is divided. Pliny places Digba at Korna, in ripa Tigris circa confluentes, – at the junction of the Tigris and the Euphrates. But Pliny has another Apamea, which was surrounded by the Tigris; and he places it in Sittacene. D'Anville (L'Euphrate et le Tigre) supposes that Apamea was at the point where the Dijeil, now dry, branched off from the Tigris. The Mesene then was between the Tigris and the Dijeil; or a tract called Mesene is to be placed there. The name "Sellas" in Stephanus is probably corrupt, and the last editor of Stephanus may have done wrong in preferring it to the reading Delas, which is nearer the name Dijeil. Although Pliny may mean the same place Apamea in both the extracts that have been given; he is probably speaking of two different places.

Even apart from Pliny's Apamea in Sittacene, apparently there were at least two different cities (one described by Pliny and Stephanus, the other by Ptolemy), which seem to have been close together – as is expressly stated in Ḳid. 71b – the upper and the lower. Nöldeke suggests that the dialect spoken in lower Apamea (that of Ptolemy), probably located at Korna, was akin to Mandaic.

== See also ==
- List of ancient Greek cities

== Sources ==
- Smith, William (editor); Dictionary of Greek and Roman Geography, "Apameia", London, (1854)
