= Amphigeneia =

Ancient city of Greece

Coordinates: 37°14′43″N 21°44′51″E

Amphigeneia (Ancient Greek: Ἀμφιγένεια) was a city in ancient Greece, which is mentioned by Homer in the Catalogue of Ships in the Iliad. It was located in either Messenia or in Triphylia, in ancient Elis. According to Strabo it was situated at the river Hypsoeis, in a region called Macistia, and there was a sanctuary of Leto in the city. According to Homer, it belonged to Nestor of Pylos. Pausanias visited the area but does not mention the city, which might indicate that it had been abandoned before the 2nd century. The ancient Eleians believed that Apollo was born here.

The location of the ancient city is tentatively located near modern Mouriatada.

== See also ==
- List of ancient Greek cities
