= Hirscher =

Hirscher is a German surname. Notable people with the surname include:

- Apollonia Hirscher (died 1547), Transylvanian Saxon merchant
- Johann Baptist von Hirscher (1788–1865), German Catholic theologian
- Marcel Hirscher (born 1989), Austrian-Dutch alpine skier
