= Laodicea (Arcadia) =

Laodicea (Greek: Λαοδίκεια), also transliterated as Laodiceia or Laodikeia, was an ancient city of Arcadia, in the Peloponnese, Greece. It is located between Megalopolis and Oresthasion (Orestium).

== See also ==
- List of ancient Greek cities
