= Stubbs, Wisconsin =

- Town
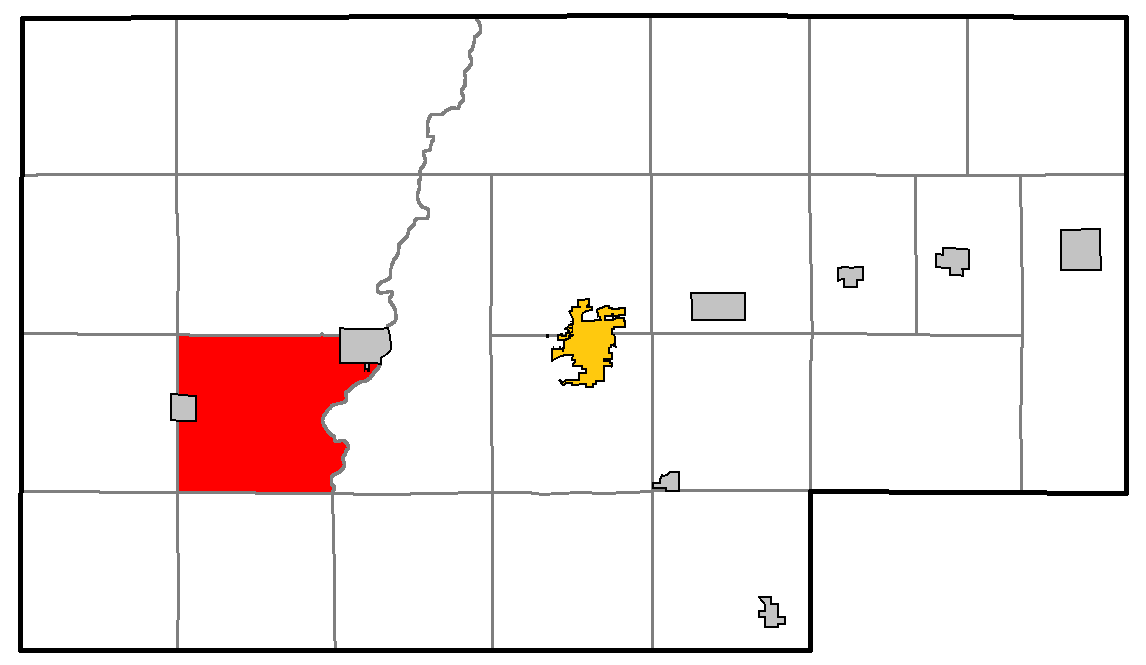
- Location of Stubbs, within Rusk County

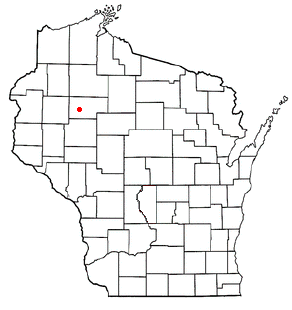
- Location of Stubbs, Wisconsin
- Coordinates: 45°26′0″N 91°20′29″W
- Country: United States
- State: Wisconsin
- County: Rusk

Area
  - Total: 36.6 sq mi (94.9 km^{2})
  - Land: 35.9 sq mi (92.9 km^{2})
  - Water: 0.77 sq mi (2.0 km^{2})
- Elevation: 1,109 ft (338 m)

Population (2020)
  - Total: 523
  - Density: 14.6/sq mi (5.63/km^{2})
- Time zone: UTC-6 (Central (CST))
  - Summer (DST): UTC-5 (CDT)
- Area codes: 715 & 534
- FIPS code: 55-77850
- GNIS feature ID: 1584238

Stubbs is a town in Rusk County, Wisconsin, United States. The population was 523 at the 2020 census. The unincorporated community of Apollonia is located in the town.

== Geography ==
According to the United States Census Bureau, the town has a total area of 36.6 square miles (94.9 km^{2}), of which 35.9 square miles (92.9 km^{2}) is land and 0.8 square mile (2.0 km^{2}) (2.07%) is water.

== Demographics ==
As of the census of 2000, there were 587 people, 226 households, and 167 families residing in the town. The population density was 16.4 people per square mile (6.3/km^{2}). There were 314 housing units at an average density of 8.8 per square mile (3.4/km^{2}). The racial makeup of the town was 98.81% White, 0.17% African American, 0.51% Native American and 0.51% Asian.

There were 226 households, out of which 28.8% had children under the age of 18 living with them, 65.0% were married couples living together, 4.9% had a female householder with no husband present, and 25.7% were non-families. 17.7% of all households were made up of individuals, and 9.3% had someone living alone who was 65 years of age or older. The average household size was 2.60 and the average family size was 2.98.

In the town, the population was spread out, with 24.2% under the age of 18, 3.6% from 18 to 24, 25.7% from 25 to 44, 27.8% from 45 to 64, and 18.7% who were 65 years of age or older. The median age was 42 years. For every 100 females, there were 110.4 males. For every 100 females age 18 and over, there were 107.0 males.

The median income for a household in the town was $36,442, and the median income for a family was $38,250. Males had a median income of $25,833 versus $20,795 for females. The per capita income for the town was $15,642. About 5.5% of families and 7.0% of the population were below the poverty line, including 11.7% of those under age 18 and 5.2% of those age 65 or over.
