= Panares =

Panares (Ancient Greek: Πανάρης) was a Greek general (strategos) of the ancient Cretan city of Kydonia in 69 BC at the time when the Romans attacked the city. Kydonia had aligned itself with the interests of pirates and incurred the anger of the Roman Senate. The Romans commissioned the praetor Marcus Antonius to take care of the Pirate Problem in the Mediterranean. In 69 BC, he besieged Kydonia. When the Romans vanquished Kydonia, Panares surrendered the city, while his fellow strategos, Lasthenes, fled to Knossos.
