= Apollonia (Athos) =

Ancient town in Chalcidice, Greece

Apollonia (Greek: Ἀπολλωνία) was an ancient town in the peninsula of Acte, or Mount Athos in Macedonia, the inhabitants of which were called Macrobii. Homer mentions Athos in the Iliad (Rhapsody 219) and, in connection to Mount Athos, Gaius Plinius Secundus (the ancient historian and Roman commander also known as Pliny the Elder), refers to the cities of Ouranoupolis, Palaiotrion, Thysson, Kleonas, and Apollonia.

The site of Apollonia is unknown.

== See also ==
- List of ancient Greek cities
