= Laodicea (Mesopotamia) =

Laodicea (Greek: Λαοδίκεια); also transliterated as Laodikeia or Laodiceia was a Hellenistic city in Mesopotamia. Pliny (vi. 30) places Laodicea along with Seleucia and Artemita. Laodicea's precise location is unknown, but it is in modern-day Iraq.

== See also ==
- List of ancient Greek cities
- Nahavand
