= Lasthenes (general) =

Lasthenes (Greek: Λασθένης) was a strategos (general) of the ancient Cretan city of Kydonia when the Romans attacked the city in 69 BC. In this era Kydonia had protected pirates and incurred the anger of the Roman Senate. When the Romans defeated Kydonia, Lasthenes' fellow strategos Panares surrendered the city, whilst Lasthenes fled to Knossos.

There is another Lasthenes, who is philosopher and friend of Dio Chrysostomus. He was a citizen of Apameia Myrleia. (Lucius Flavius Philostratos, Vita Apollonius (Life of Apollonius of Tyana), V.38)

== See also ==
- Knossos
