= Chamaizi =

Archaeological site in Crete

Coordinates: 35°10′N 26°01′E

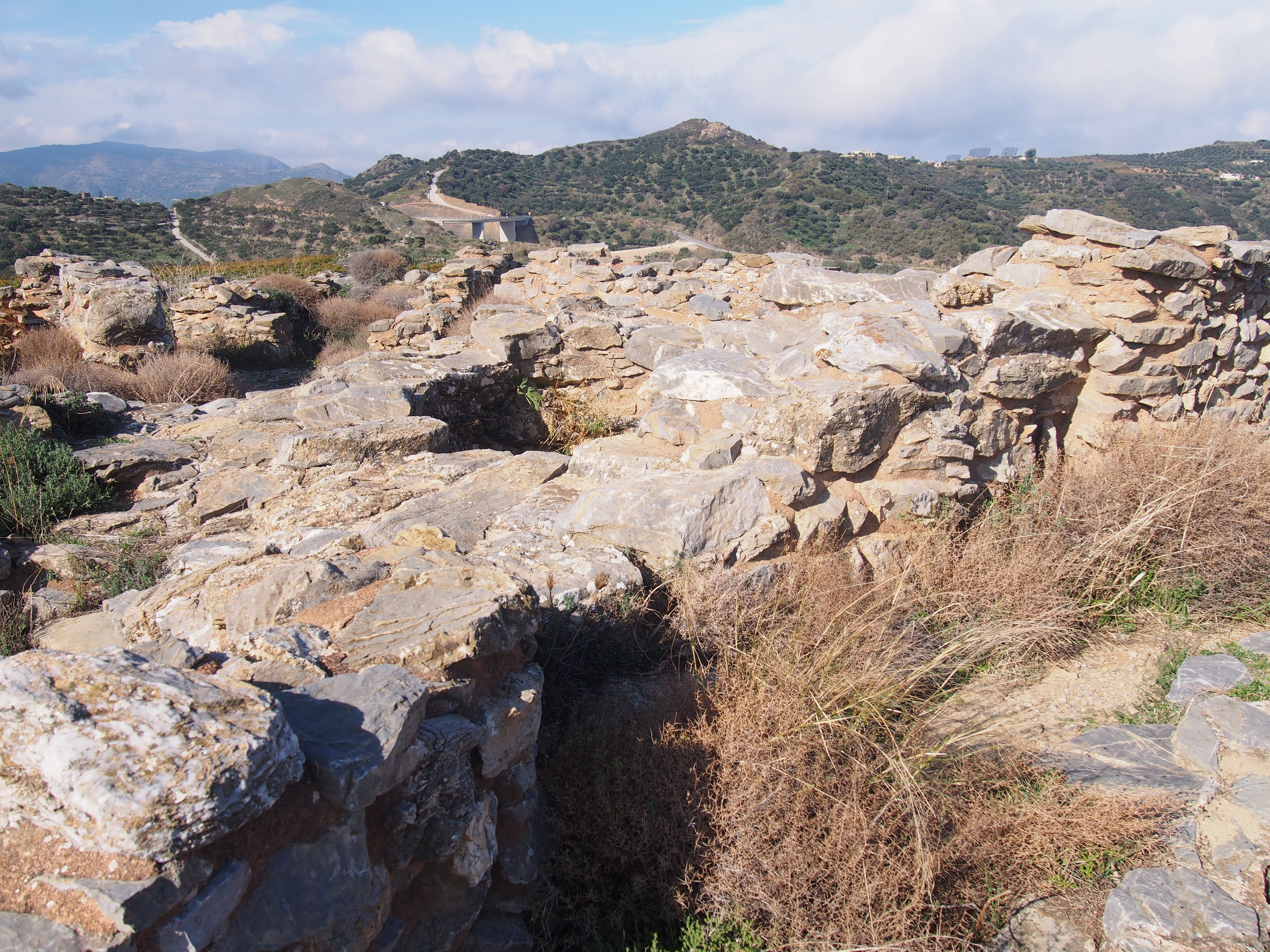
The central court of the House of Chamezi.

Chamaizi is an ancient archaeological site in eastern Crete with the only known oval-shaped building of the Minoan period. Below this building is evidence of Early Minoan building foundations.

== Archaeology ==
Chamaizi was first excavated in 1903 by Stephanos Xanthoudides, and again in 1971 by Costis Davaras.

The MMIA building centers around a cistern. The cistern likely collected water from rainfall, as the hilltop on which the building is situated, Souvloto Mouri (meaning pointed hill), has no wells or springs.

Finds excavated from Chamaizi are at the Agios Nikolaos Museum and the Heraklion Archaeological Museum.

== Gallery ==
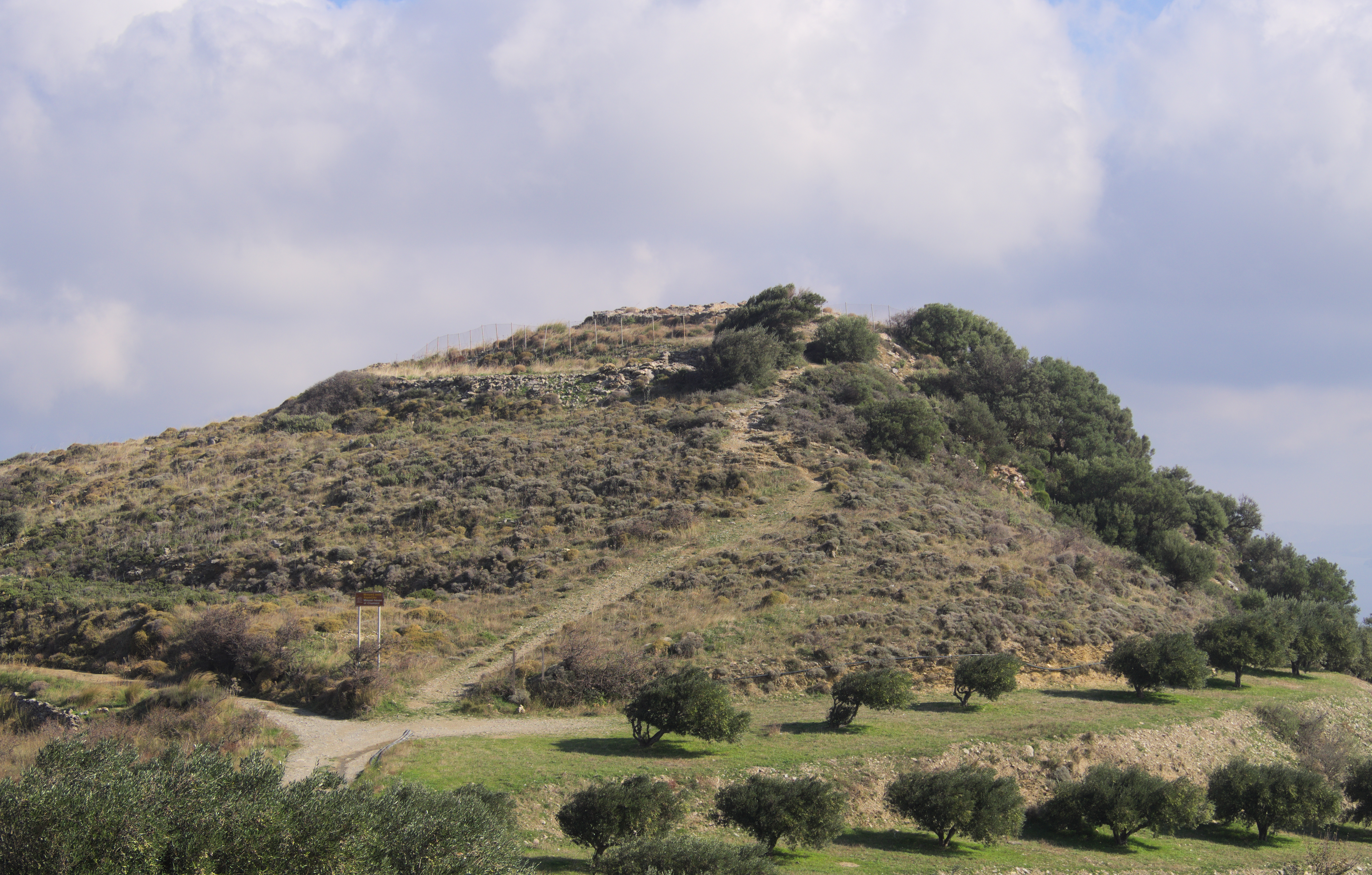
The hill Souvloto Mouri, on top of which is the minoan house

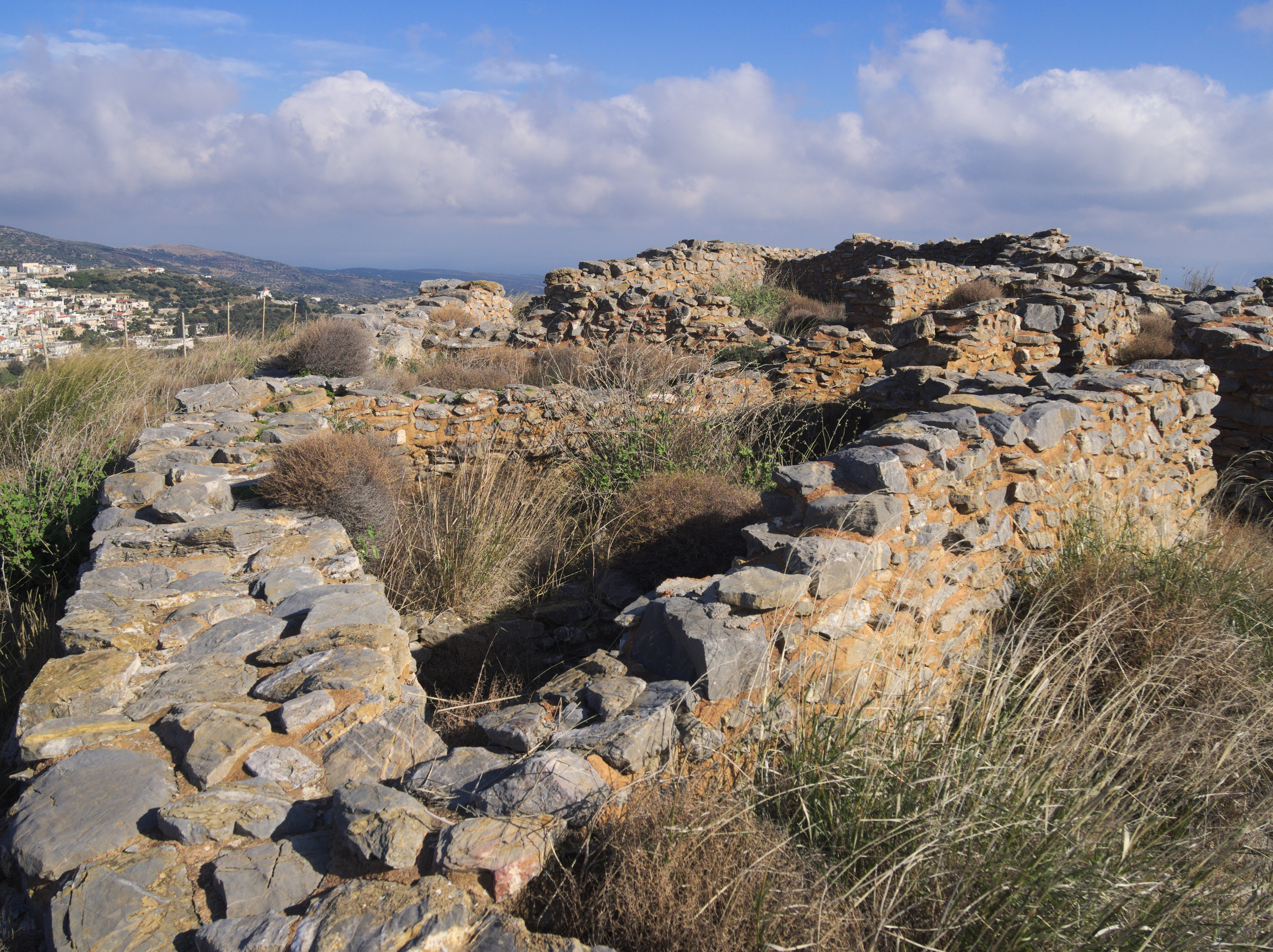
The exterior wall of the house

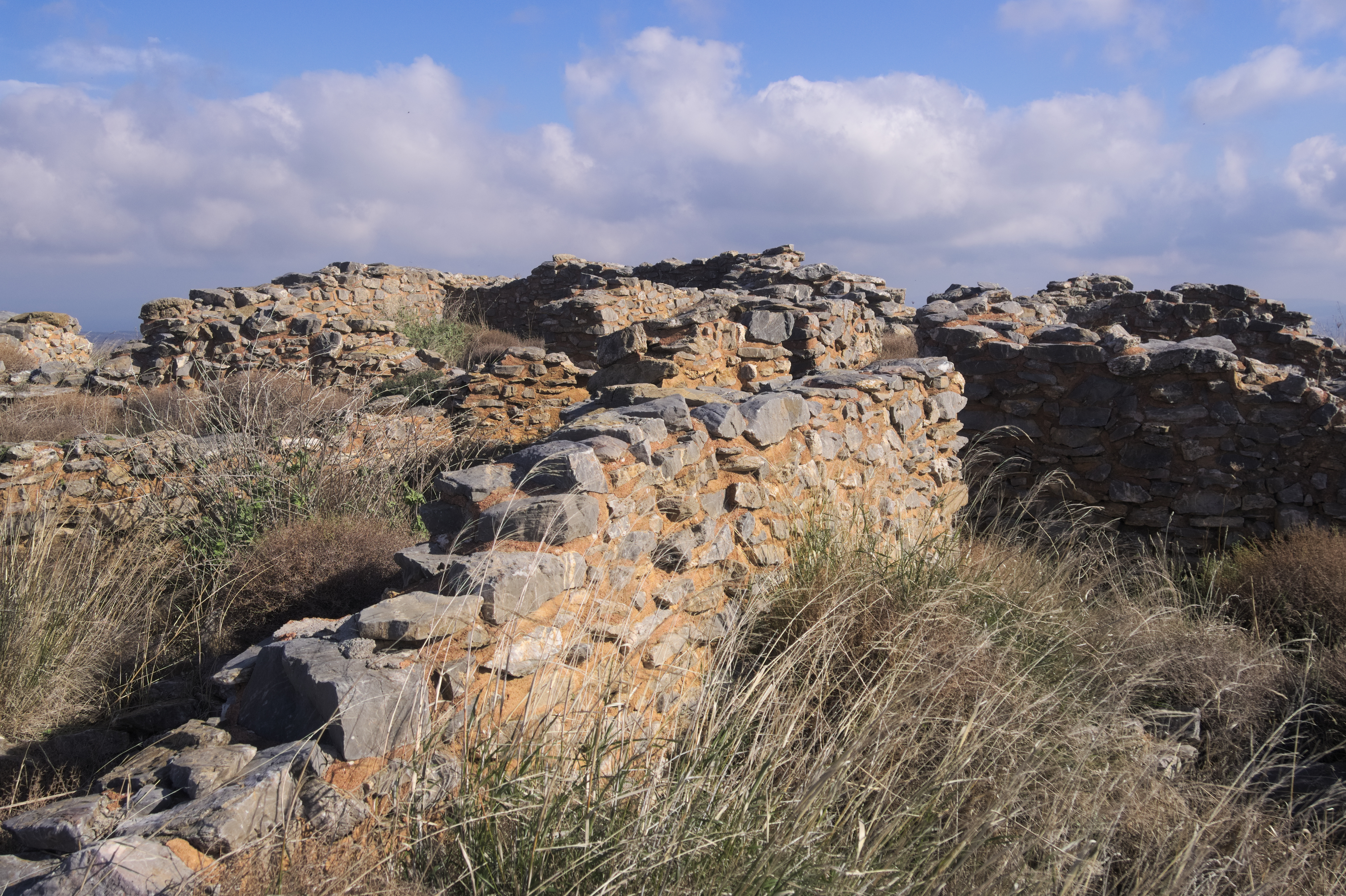
The rooms of the house
