= Apollonia, Sifnos (ancient town) =

Apollonia (Ancient Greek: Ἀπολλωνία) was an ancient town on the island of Siphnos.

Its site is unlocated.
