= Diogenes of Apollonia =

5th-century BC Greek philosopher

- Born: 5th century BCE; Apollonia Pontica
- Died: 5th century BCE

Philosophical work
- Era: Pre-Socratic philosophy
- Region: Western philosophy
- Main interests: Nature, Medicine
- Notable ideas: Air is the arche

Diogenes of Apollonia (/daɪˈɒdʒɪniːz/ dy-OJ-in-eez; Ancient Greek: Διογένης ὁ Ἀπολλωνιάτης, romanized: Diogénēs ho Apollōniátēs; fl. 5th century BC) was a pre-Socratic Greek philosopher, and was a native of the Milesian colony Apollonia in Thrace. He lived for some time in Athens. He believed air to be the one source of all being from which all other substances were derived, and, as a primal force, to be both divine and intelligent. He also wrote a description of the organization of blood vessels in the human body. His ideas were parodied by the dramatist Aristophanes, and may have influenced the Orphic philosophical commentary preserved in the Derveni papyrus. His philosophical work has not survived in a complete form, and his doctrines are known chiefly from lengthy quotations of his work by Simplicius, as well as a few summaries in the works of Aristotle, Theophrastus, and Aetius.

== Life ==
Diogenes was a native of the Milesian colony Apollonia Pontica in Thrace, present-day Sozopol on the Black Sea. (Note: The alternative view, not accepted by many modern scholars, is that the Apollonia in question was the Cretan city that originally was Eleutherna) His father's name was Apollothemis. Nothing is known of the events in his life, except that he lived for some time in Athens. Diogenes Laërtius states that his unpopularity, or "intense jealousy", put his life in danger in Athens, (Note: Diogenes Laërtius, ix. 57 (DK 64A1). Robert Drew Hicks' wording refers to his "unpopularity", while Pamela Mensch's translation refers to "intense jealousy".) but there may be confusion with Anaxagoras who is mentioned in the same passage. Like all the physiologoi (natural philosophers), he wrote in the Ionic dialect.

== Philosophy ==
Diogenes is characterized by Theophrastus as the last of the "physiologoi" or natural philosophers. As a material monist, he synthesized the work of earlier monists such as Anaximenes and Heraclitus with the pluralism of Anaxagoras and Empedocles and argued that air was a divine cosmic ordering principle that he also equated with intelligence. He does not appear to have been influenced by the Atomists.

=== Air ===
Diogenes, like Anaximenes, believed air to be the one source of all being, and all other substances to be derived from it by condensation and rarefaction. This he modified by the theories of his contemporary Anaxagoras, and asserted that air, the primal force, was intelligent:

And it seems to me that that which possessed thought is what people call air, and that by this everyone both is governed and has power over everything. For it is this which seems to me to be god and to have reached everything and to arrange everything and to be in everything. And there is not a single thing which does not share in it. (Note: Simplicius, Commentary on the Physics, 152 (DK 64B5))

The nature of the universe is air, limitless and eternal, from which, as it condenses and rarefies and changes its properties, the other forms come into being. (Note: Simplicius, Commentary on the Physics, 25.1-9 (DK 64A5)) Among his other doctrines, he is said to have believed that there was an infinite number of worlds, and infinite void; that air, densified and rarefied, produced the different worlds; that nothing was produced from nothing, or was reduced to nothing; that the Earth was round, supported in the middle, and had received its shape from the whirling round of the warm vapours, and its concretion and hardening from cold. (Note: Diogenes Laërtius, ix. 57 (DK 64A1))

=== Physiology ===
The longest surviving fragment of Diogenes is that which is inserted by Aristotle in the third book of his History of Animals. (Note: Aristotle History of Animals, 511-12 (DK 64B6)) It contains a description of the distribution of the blood vessels in the human body. It is notable chiefly because "here we can read at first hand what in the case of the other Presocratics we learn only indirectly: an attempt to describe in scientific detail the structure and organization of the physical world."

== Works ==
None of Diogenes' work has survived in a complete form. The majority of the surviving fragments of Diogenes work come from Simplicius, a late antique philosopher from the Neoplatonic Academy who wrote a commentary on Aristotle's Physics, where he quotes several long excerpts from Diogenes' work. Based on the account given by Simplicius, it is unclear to modern scholars whether Diogenes wrote four separate works, "On Nature", "On the Nature of Man", "Meteorology", and "Against the Sophist", or only one work On Nature, which included portions that touched on each of the other three topics.

== Legacy ==
Modern scholars generally agree that some views of Diogenes are transferred to Aristophanes' depiction of Socrates in The Clouds. (Note: Aristophanes. The Clouds, 264 (DK 64C2)) as well as in a fragment of Philemon.

Based on an initial evaluation by Hermann Diels, Diogenes was not studied frequently in modern scholarships up until the past few decades. However, with the discovery of the Derveni papyrus, an Orphic philosophical poem which has many parallels to the philosophy of both Diogenes and Anaxagoras, many scholars have analyzed Diogenes' work to better understand the links between Ancient Greek religion and philosophy.

Diogenite meteorites are named for Diogenes of Apollonia, who was the first to suggest an outer space origin for meteorites:

With the visible stars revolve stones which are invisible, and for that reason nameless. They often fall on the ground and are extinguished, like the stone star that came down on fire at Aegospotami. (Note: Aetius, ii. 13. 9)
