= Apollonia (southern Crete) =

Coordinates: 35°12′18″N 24°22′54″E

Apollonia (Ancient Greek: Ἀπολλωνία), also called Eleuthera (Ἐλεύθερα) was an ancient city on the southern coast of Crete. It was located near modern Sellia.

William Smith states that the philosopher Diogenes Apolloniates was a native of the environs of Apollonia (the Apolloniates), although other scholars claim that the Apollonia in question was the Thracian one.

== See also ==
- List of ancient Greek cities
