= Apamea (Sittacene) =

Apamea or Apameia (Greek: Απάμεια) is an ancient Hellenistic city described by Pliny (vi. 31) in Sittacene, which was surrounded by the Tigris. Its precise current location is not known.

It received the name of Apamea from the mother of Antiochus I Soter, the first of the Seleucids; Strabo asserts 261 BCE for its foundation. (Pliny adds: haec dividitur Archoo, as if a stream flowed through the town). D'Anville (L'Euphrate et le Tigre) supposes that Apamea was at the point where the Dijeil, now dry, branched off from the Tigris. D'Anville places the bifurcation near Samarrah, and there he puts Apamea. But Lynch (London Geog. Journal, vol. ix. p. 473) shows that the Dijeil branched off near Jibbarah, a little north of 34° North latitude. He supposes that the Dijeil once swept the end of the Median Wall and flowed between it and Jibbarah. Somewhere, then, about this place Apamea may have been, for this point of the bifurcation of the Tigris is one degree of latitude north of Seleucia, and if the course of the river is measured, it will probably be not far from the distance which Pliny gives (cxxv. M. P.).

== See also ==
- List of ancient Greek cities
