= Apollonia (Aetolia) =

Apollonia (Ancient Greek: Ἀπολλωνία) was a town on the frontiers of ancient Aetolia and Phocis near Naupactus. Stephanus of Byzantium connects this Apollonia with Homeric Cyparissus.

== See also ==
- List of ancient Greek cities
