= Apollonia University =

Coordinates: 47.15744°N 27.59819°E

- Type: Private
- Established: 1991
- Location: Iași, Romania
- Website: www.univapollonia.ro

The Apollonia University is a private university in Iași, Romania. Founded in 1991, it was named in honor of the Saint Apollonia.

== Structure ==
Faculties

- Faculty of Dental Medicine
- Faculty of Communication Sciences
