= Apollonia, Wisconsin =

- Unincorporated community
- Location within Wisconsin Location within the United States
- Coordinates: 45°27′00″N 91°18′06″W
- Country: United States
- State: Wisconsin
- County: Rusk
- Elevation: 1,112 ft (339 m)
- Time zone: UTC-6 (Central (CST))
  - Summer (DST): UTC-5 (CDT)
- Area codes: 715 & 534
- GNIS feature ID: 1560897

Apollonia is an unincorporated community located in the town of Stubbs, Rusk County, Wisconsin, United States. Apollonia is located along U.S. Route 8, 1.5 miles (2.4 km) west-southwest of Bruce.
