= Kannia =

City in ancient Greece

Kannia was an ancient Minoan city close to Gortyn in south-central Crete.

== See also ==
- List of ancient Greek cities
