= Hēmeroskopeion =

Ancient Greek coastal city of Iberia

Hēmeroskopeion (Ancient Greek: Ἡμεροσκοπεῖον) was an ancient Greek city.

Its location is unknown but it has been suggested by some scholars (and rejected by others) that it existed on what is now the city of Dénia, the judicial seat of the comarca of Marina Alta in the province of Alicante, which is a division of the Valencian Community, Spain. Its name means watchtower in Greek and it reflects the first use of the lofty promontory as such. According to Strabo, it was a small city and was founded by the Massaliot Greeks together with another two neighbouring and equally small cities, the names of which have not survived. The city was later conquered by the Romans and it was named Dianium, whence the modern name. This town was situated on the cape then called Artemisium (Ancient Greek: Ἀρτεμίσιον) or Dianium (Ancient Greek: Διάνιον), named from a temple of Ephesia Artemis built upon it (goddess Artemis was called Diana in Latin). Apart from its strategic location the city was equally important for the iron mines that existed nearby.

== Toponymy ==
The term hēmeroskópeion translates from Greek as "watchtower" or "daytime observatory". It is believed that its primary function was to monitor the passage of tuna shoals during annual migrations and to serve as a hub for fishing operations. For a significant portion of the 20th century, there was speculation that the term Dianio stemmed from an Iberian settlement named Diniu, which was supported by certain coinage discoveries. However, this has been identified as a misinterpretation of Tabaniu, an Iberian mint located in the middle Ebro valley. Consequently, the prevailing theory today accepts the traditional idea that Dianio is derived from Diana, the Roman goddess equated with Artemis.

== History ==
The location was a notable commercial and fishing emporium. A prominent feature of this area was the sanctuary dedicated to Artemis of Ephesus, with its roots in Massalian tradition. Strabo provides the following account of the site:

Μεταξὺ μὲν οὖν τοῦ Σούκρωνος καὶ τῆς Καρχηδόνος τρία πολίχνια Μασσαλιωτῶν ἔστιν οὐ πολὺ ἄπωθεν τοῦ ποταμοῦ· τούτων δ᾽ ἐστὶ γνωριμώτατον τὸ Ἡμεροσκοπεῖον ἔχον ἐπὶ τῇ ἄκρᾳ τῆς Ἐφεσίας Ἀρτέμιδος ἱερὸν σφόδρα τιμώμενον͵ ᾧ ἐχρήσατο Σερτώριος ὁρμητηρίῳ κατὰ θάλατταν· ἐρυμνὸν γάρ ἐστι καὶ λῃστρικόν͵ κάτοπτον δὲ ἐκ πολλοῦ τοῖς προσπλέουσι͵ καλεῖται δὲ [καὶ] Διάνιον͵ οἷον Ἀρτεμίσιον͵ ἔχον σιδηρεῖα εὐφυῆ πλησίον καὶ νησίδια Πλανησίαν καὶ Πλουμβαρίαν καὶ λιμνοθάλατταν ὑπερκειμένην͵ ἔχουσαν ἐν κύκλῳ σταδίους τετρακοσίους.
Thus, between the Sucro and Carthago Nova, there are three establishments of the Massaliotes not far from the river. The most well-known of these is Hemeroscopio, which has atop the promontory a highly venerated sanctuary of Artemis of Ephesus and which Sertorius used as a maritime operations base. It is well fortified and suitable for pirates, visible from afar for those approaching by sea. It is also called Dianio, which is the same as Artemisio. Nearby, there are prosperous iron mines and islets, Planesia and Plumbaria, and a salty lake inland that has a perimeter of four hundred stadia.

— Strabo's Geographica: Book III (4, 6)

The city must have already existed around the 1st century BC, judging by mentions from Strabo and Cicero, who noted it was used during the civil wars as a military base by Quintus Sertorius. While the foundation date of the Roman city cannot be determined, it is known that the settlement possibly inherited from the Iberian establishments at Punta de Benimaquia or Pico del Águila.

In the 1st century, it held the legal status of a civitas stipendiaria, which meant that it had to pay tribute and was subject to the power of the provincial governor, in this case, Hispania Citerior. Inscriptions found in the area of the ancient city mention several decurions as municipal officials, indicating they date to a time after the era of the Flavian dynasty (late 1st century), when municipalities were unified. It is also known that during the same period, there was a college of Sodales Augustales, an organization of freedmen dedicated to the imperial cult.

Funerary discoveries confirm that the city remained active during the 3rd and early 4th centuries. It is likely that it was one of the cities under Byzantine control around the 6th century.

== See also ==
- List of ancient Greek cities

== Bibliography ==
- Manuel Cerdá (2009), "Gran enciclopedia temática de la Comunidad Valenciana", Prensa Valenciana (in Spanish)
- García Quintela, Marco (2007). Geografía de Iberia. "Glosario: Hemeroscopio". Madrid: Alianza Editorial. p. 392. ISBN 978-84-206-6172-8.
- Pabón de Urbina, José María (1996). Diccionario Manual Griego: griego clásico - español. "ἡμερο-σκόπος ου" (PDF). Madrid: Vox: Spes. p. 392. ISBN 9788483321492.
- Francisco Javier Fernández Nieto, "Hemeroskopeion=Thynnoskopeion. El final de un problema histórico mal enfocado.", in Centro de Ediciones de la Diputación de Málaga (ed.), Revista MAINAKE n. 24, p. 231-255, 2002 (in Spanish)
