= Palaechorium =

Town in ancient Macedonia

Palaechorium or Palaichorion (Ancient Greek: Παλαιοχώριον) was a town of Acte, ancient Macedonia noted by Pliny the Elder. The name has also come down to us in the form Palaeorium.

Its site is unlocated.
