= Apellonia =

Town and city-state in ancient Crete

Coordinates: 35°24′18″N 25°01′07″E

Apellonia (Ancient Greek: Ἀπελλωνία), also Apollonia (Ἀπολλωνία), was a town and polis (city-state) of ancient Crete.

The site of Apellonia is located near modern Agia Pelagia.
