= Naxos (Crete) =

Coordinates: 35.243°N 25.708°E

Naxos or Naxus (Ancient Greek: Νάξος) was a town of ancient Crete, according to the Scholiast (ad Pind. Isth. vi. 107) celebrated for its whetstones. Some classicists have doubted the existence of this city. The islands Crete and Naxos were famed for their whetstones (Plin. xxxvi. 22; xviii. 28), hence the confusion.

Modern scholarship and archaeology seem to confirm its existence. Naxos was located near the ancient city of Olous, atop a mountain now called Oxa where ruins can still be found.

== See also ==
- List of ancient Greek cities
