= Apollonia (northern Crete) =

Coordinates: 35°20′13″N 25°03′37″E

Apollonia (Ancient Greek: Ἀπολλωνία) was an ancient city in northern Crete located near modern Gazi. Polybius reports an alleged incident in which the city was betrayed by Kydonia, a former ally.

== See also ==
- List of ancient Greek cities
