= Apolloniatis =

Apolloniatis (/əˌpɒləˈnaɪətəs/; "near Apollonia") may refer to several different places in the ancient world:

- A large, shallow lake of ancient Bithynia, the modern Ulubat Gölü in Turkey
- A region about Sittace, also called Sittacene
