= Apollonia (Mysia) =

Ancient city of Teuthrania/Mysia

- Location within Turkey
- 39°12′09″N 27°29′40″E
- Cultures: Lydia
- Location: Aegean Turkey
- Region: Manisa Province

Apollonia (Ancient Greek: Ἀπολλωνία) was a town of ancient Mysia, Anatolia, situated on an eminence east of Pergamum, on the way to Sardis. It seems to have been near the borders of Mysia and Lydia.

The site of Apollonia is located between the modern Turkish towns of Hamidiye and Dualar. The larger town of Soma is just to the east.

== See also ==
- List of ancient Greek cities
