= Pherae (Aetolia) =

Ancient settlement in Aetolia

Pherae or Pherai (Ancient Greek: Φεραί) was a town in ancient Aetolia.
