= Apollonia Hirscher =

Transylvanian Saxon merchant (died 1547)

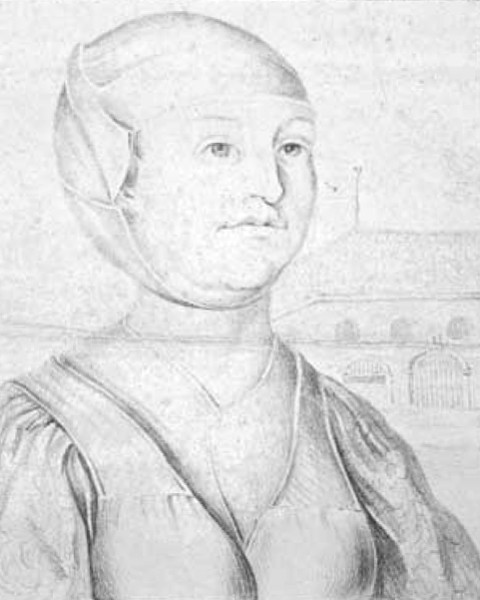
Apollonia Hirscher

Apollonia Hirscher (died 1547), was a Transylvanian Saxon merchant of what is now Brașov in Romania, part of the Eastern Hungarian Kingdom during her lifetime. She inherited and managed a merchant empire from her late spouse, mayor Lukas Hirscher III (d. 1541), and traded with Austria and the Ottoman Empire. She was the builder of the Brașov House of Merchants.
