= Kydonia =

Ancient city in Crete, Greece

Khania
- Kydonia
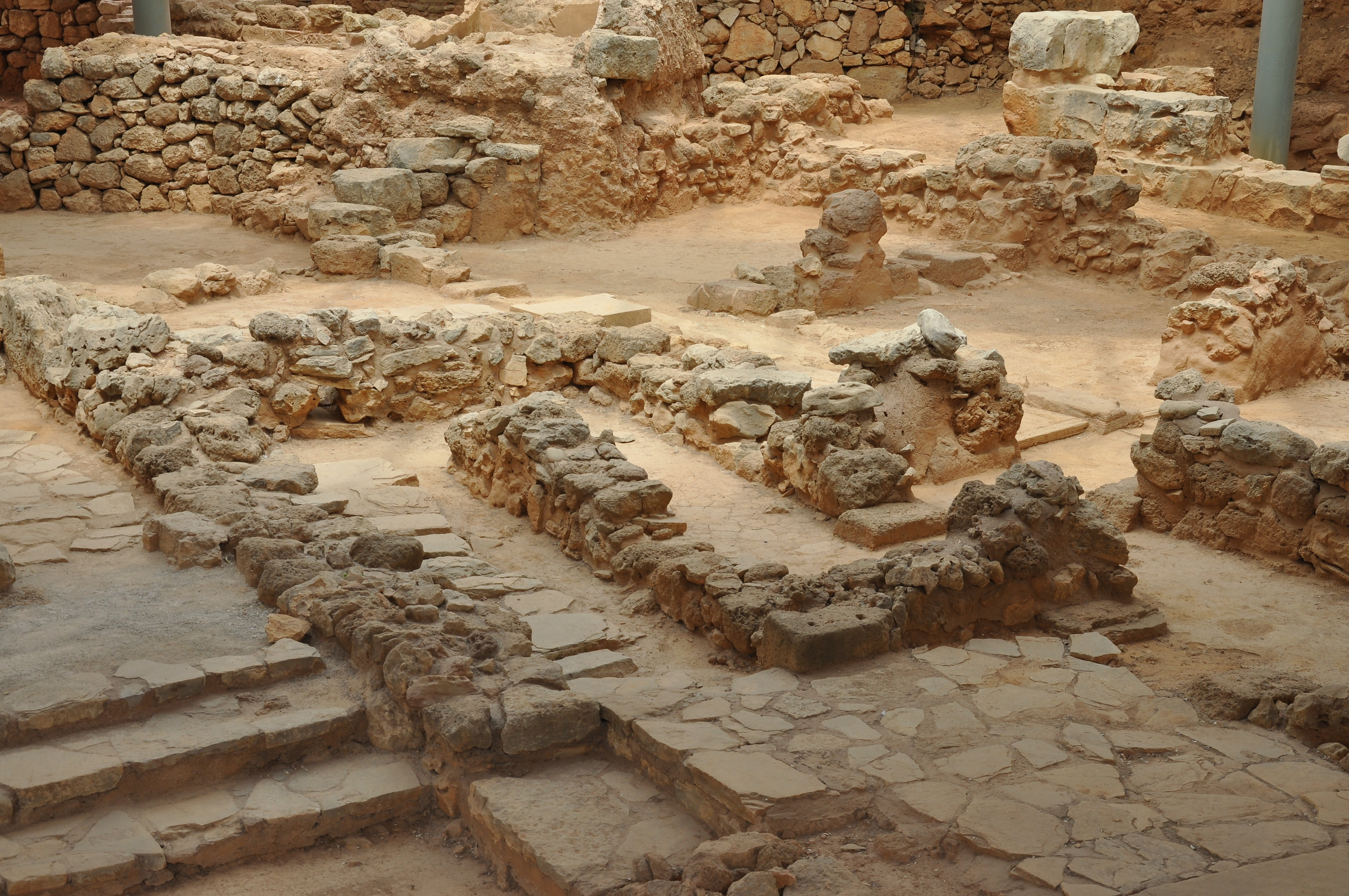
- Excavations of Minoan Kydonia

- 35°31′N 24°1′E
- Type: Minoan settlement
- Cultures: Minoan, Mycenaean
- Location: Chania, Crete, Greece

Site notes
- Public access: Yes

Kydonia (/sɪˈdoʊniə/ or /kaɪˈdoʊniə/), also known as Cydonia (Ancient Greek: Κυδωνία, Kydōnía) was an ancient city located at the site of present-day Chania near the west end of the island of Crete in Greece. The city is known from archaeological remains dating back to the Minoan era as well as literary and historical sources. It was added as a UNESCO World Heritage Site in 2025.

== History ==
In the area of Kastelli Hill, which is the citadel of Chania's harbor, archaeological excavations have discovered ceramic sherds and finds that date from the Neolithic to Late Minoan IIIC.

=== Early Bronze ===
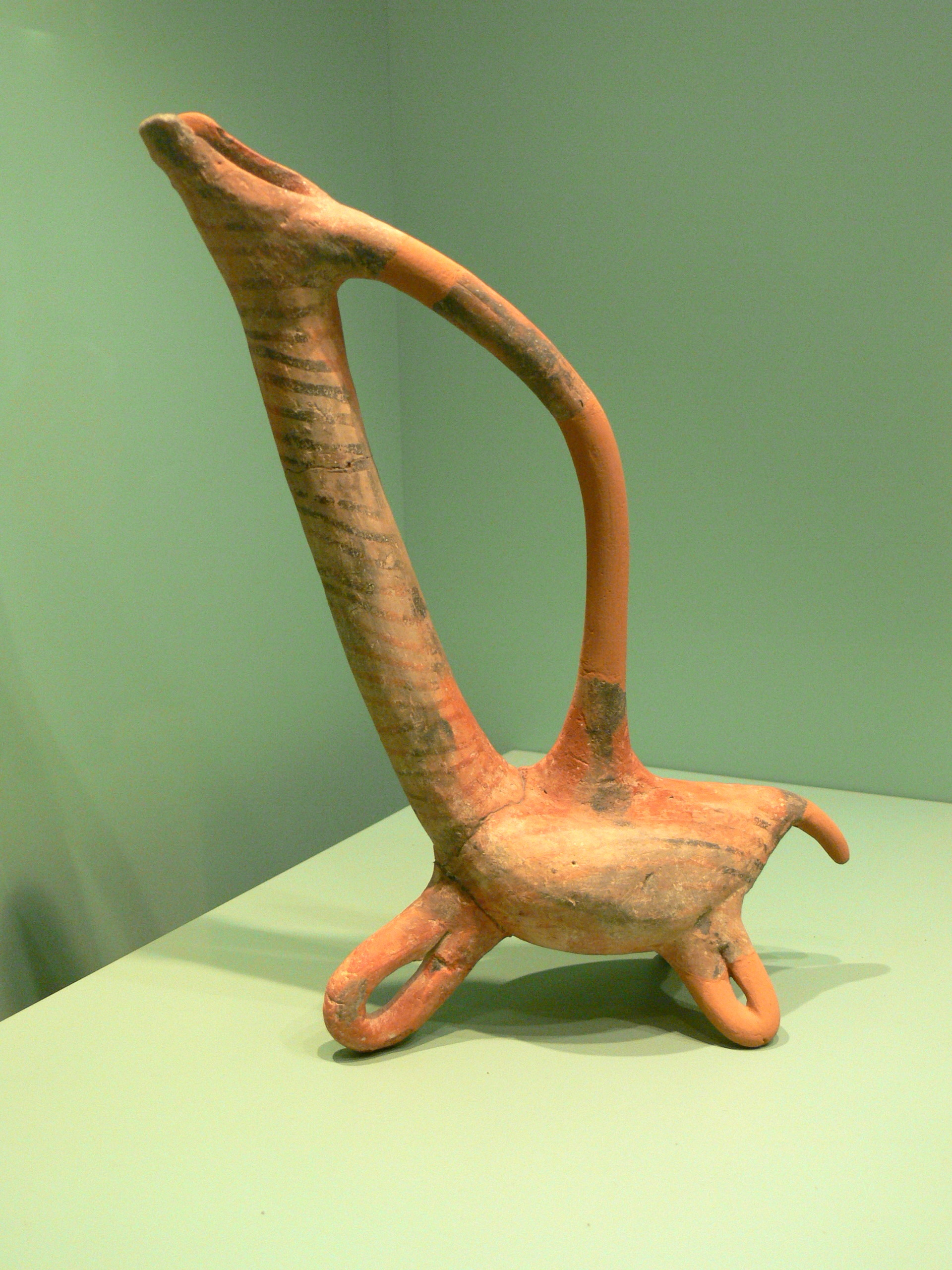
Early Minoan bird-shaped vessel (3000–2300 BC)

Scarce finds such as walls and ground floors confirm that the systematic habitation of the hill began during Early Minoan (EM) II period.

=== Middle Bronze ===
In the Middle Bronze Age, the material culture on Crete is known as Middle Minoan (MM).

==== Late pre-palatial period ====
In the MM IA (c. 2050/2000-1925/1900 BC), the architecture was still pre-palatial. These levels were destroyed with the construction of the neopalatial town.

==== Neo-palatial period ====
In the Middle Minoan III (MM III; c. 1750/1720-1675/1650 BC), a palace was built marking the beginning of the Neo-Palatial Period.

A large archive of Linear A tablets (97) have been found, the second largest archive known. The tablets were largely economic records of agricultural produce, people and animals.

=== Late Bronze ===
A Minoan House (House I) with the characteristic hall was also unearthed. It was destroyed by fire during Late Minoan (LM) IB period. The houses from LMIIIA phase belonged to a palatial settlement, which ceased to exist in LMIII.

The city extended beyond Kastelli Hill as the excavations in Daskalogiannis Street revealed, where a LMI sanctuary or "lustral basin" came to light. The discovery of a corpus of Linear A and Linear B tablets points out the presence of an archive. Moreover, the archaeologists have identified the existence of a local pottery workshop, which was active in LMIII.

At the end of the LM IB, Kydonia seem to have been abandoned for a period.

==== Mycenean period ====
In the Late Minoan IIIA (LM IIIA; 1435/1405-1360/1325 BC), new houses are built. At the end of LM IIIA, the houses are destroyed by fire. In "House 1" three Linear B tablets were found. In the Late Minoan IIIB (LM IIIB; 1360/1325-1200/1190 BC), the town was rebuilt again.

In the Mycenean Period, Linear B is only found at the Cretan sites of Knossos, Kydonia/Chania and Malia. This indicates a scriptorium and archive within a possible palace in Kydonia. It has been suggested that the name of the city is first mentioned in Linear B tablets from Knossos as Ku-do-ni-ja (Mycenaean Greek: 𐀓𐀈𐀛𐀊). Unlike other sites on Crete, Kydonia maintained major trading activities. In the LM IIIA and LM IIIB, it was a large commercial and maritime center, exporting pottery, oil, perfume and wine throughout the Aegean.

=== Iron Age ===
Archaeological evidence from the Early Iron Age and Archaic Era is limited.

In 429 BC, during the Peloponnesian War, Kydonia was attacked by the Athenians after the accusations of Nikias from Gortyna for pro-Spartan policy. In 343 BC the city was besieged by Phalaikos and his army of mercenaries after his failed attempt to capture Lyttus. He was killed from a lightning strike that burnt his siege engines.

=== Hellenistic period ===
In the Hellenistic period, Kydonia took part in the struggle for domination among the cities of Crete. At the end of the 3rd century BC a peace treaty with Aptera was signed.

During the Lyttian War In 220/219 BC both cities joined the alliance of the Oreioi (in which Polyrrhenia was a member) and canceled the one with Knossos. Aggressive policy led to the capture of Phalasarna (184 B.C.E) and 14 years later that of Apollonia, an action criticized by Polybius since they were allies.

The Greeks associated Kydonia with the quince fruit, and the word "quince" ultimately originates in the Greek for "Kydonian apple".

=== Roman period ===
In 69 BC the Romans under Quintus Caecilius Metellus Creticus, after the failed attempt of Marcus Antonius Creticus, invaded Crete. The Cretan general Lasthenes confronted them in the battle of Kydonia, where he lost and retreated. This outcome forced Cretan general Panares to capitulate to the Romans and deliver them the city without resistance. The coins of the city-state depict Kydon either as an infant suckling a female Cretan hound or as an archer stringing his bow, accompanied by his dog.

The remaining base from the Hellenistic wall can be seen below the Byzantine wall of Kastelli Hill. Rescue excavations have discovered Hellenistic facilities below buildings of the modern city.

After the battle of Actium (31 BC) Augustus set Kydonia free for its assistance to him. Kydonians are mentioned in book 12 of the Aeneid, where their excellent bow skills are used in an extended Virgilian simile describing the Fury's descent to Juturna. The editors of the Barrington Atlas of the Greek and Roman World suggest that the city also bore the name Apollonia (Ἀπολλωνία, Apollōnía) at some point.

=== Late Antiquity ===
In 365 the city must have been affected by the earthquake that devastated many cities of Crete. The Episcopate of Kydonia is referred in many ecclesiastical documents. The earliest is in 381 when Cydonius the bishop of Kydonia takes part in the First council of Constantinople. The prosperity of the city during Late Roman times is illustrated by the mosaics of houses found near Agora Square. Roman workshops have been found in some parts of the modern city. Material from the urban architecture of the ancient city was used for the construction of Kastelli Hill's Byzantine wall.

=== Middle Ages ===
The first Byzantine period of Kydonia ended with the Arab conquest of Crete in the 820s. After the Byzantine reconquest of Crete in 961, the bishopric was transferred outside the city near the village of Agya. It is uncertain when the toponym Kydonia ceased to be used in place of forms of the modern Chania. The scholars suggest that the name was changed by the Arabs, who named the city al-Ḵān (Arabic: الخان, "the Caravanserai" or "Inn"). This name may have derived from a suburb of Kydonia called Alchania Komi, where the god Welchanos had been worshipped in antiquity. Under Venetian rule, the city was known as Canea.

=== Modernity ===
The name is preserved in the Metropolis of Kydonia and Apokoronas, which was established in 1962. Today's archaeological recoveries from the ancient city of Kydonia are largely stored in the Chania Archaeological Museum in present-day Chania.

== Identification ==
The exact location of Kydonia was not understood until Robert Pashley worked it out based solely on ancient historical literature without any archaeological recovery. John Pendlebury also identified Chania with ancient Kydonia. Ancient authors suggest that Kydonia was located in western Crete, facing the Peloponnese. Strabo calculated its distance from other cities of Crete.

== Necropolis ==
Since Kydonia was inhabited for centuries, the necropolis of the city is quite extended and includes graveyards from all periods. It lies below the modern city of Chania. Burial types that have been found include chamber tombs, cist graves, and loculus tombs.

== Legacy ==
The Odyssey mentions a tribe called the Kydonians who live on both sides of the Iardanos River. Herodotus claims that the city was founded by Samians c. 520 BC, who later on were defeated and enslaved by a coalition of Aeginetans and other Cretans.

Some legends claim that Kydonia was founded by a king named Cydon (Κύδων, Kýdōn), a son of Hermes or Apollo and of Akakallis, the daughter of King Minos. According to Pausanias, he was son of king Tegeates. Diodorus Siculus claimed that the city was founded by King Minos.

The region of Cydonia on Mars was named for the Cretan city.

In 2025, the site was designated as a World Heritage Site by UNESCO.

== Famous Kydonians ==
- Aristocles (5th century BC), sculptor
- Kresilas (5th century BC), sculptor

== See also ==
- List of ancient Greek cities
- Malaxa
- Polichne
- Cydonia (region of Mars)
