= Chorio- =

Chorio, Choriò or Chorio- may refer to:

- Choroid, as in chorioretinitis
- Chorion, as in chorioamnionitis
- Choriò, Calabria, a municipality in Calabria, Italy
- Chorio, Greece (or Horio), a Greek village in the island of Halki

== See also ==
- Kalo Chorio (disambiguation)
- Kokkino Chorio, a village in the Chania region, Crete
- Mesa Chorio, a village in the Paphos District of Cyprus
- Pera Chorio, a village in the Nicosia District of Cyprus
- Xiro Chorio, a borough of the city of Rethymno, on Crete
