= Kalo Chorio =

Kalo Chorio may refer to the following places:

in Cyprus

- Kalo Chorio (Çamlıköy), a village near Lefka
- Kalo Chorio (Kapouti), a village near Morphou
- Kalo Chorio, Larnaca, a village near Larnaca
- Kalo Chorio, Limassol, a village north of Limassol
- Kalo Chorio, Nicosia, a village near Klirou

in Greece

- Kalo Chorio, Lasithi, a village in the municipality of Agios Nikolaos, Crete

== See also ==
- Chorio, Greece (or Horio), a Greek village in the island of Halki
- Xiro Chorio, a borough of the city of Rethymno, on Crete
