= Myloi =

Myloi (Greek: Μύλοι) may refer to places in Greece:

- Myloi, Argolis, a place in the southwestern part of Argolis
- Myloi, Euboea, a village in Euboea, part of the municipal unit Karystos
- Myloi, Phthiotis, a village in Phthiotis, part of the municipal unit Pelasgia
- Myloi, Samos, a village on the island of Samos, part of the municipal unit Pythagoreio
- Myloi, Rethymno, a village on the island of Crete, part of the municipality Rethymno

== See also ==
- Ereipia Myloi, ancient ruins in Thesprotia
- Lampou Myloi, a place in the island of Lesbos
