= Halevi Monastery =

Greek Orthodox former monastery, now church, in Crete

- Μονή Χαλεβή
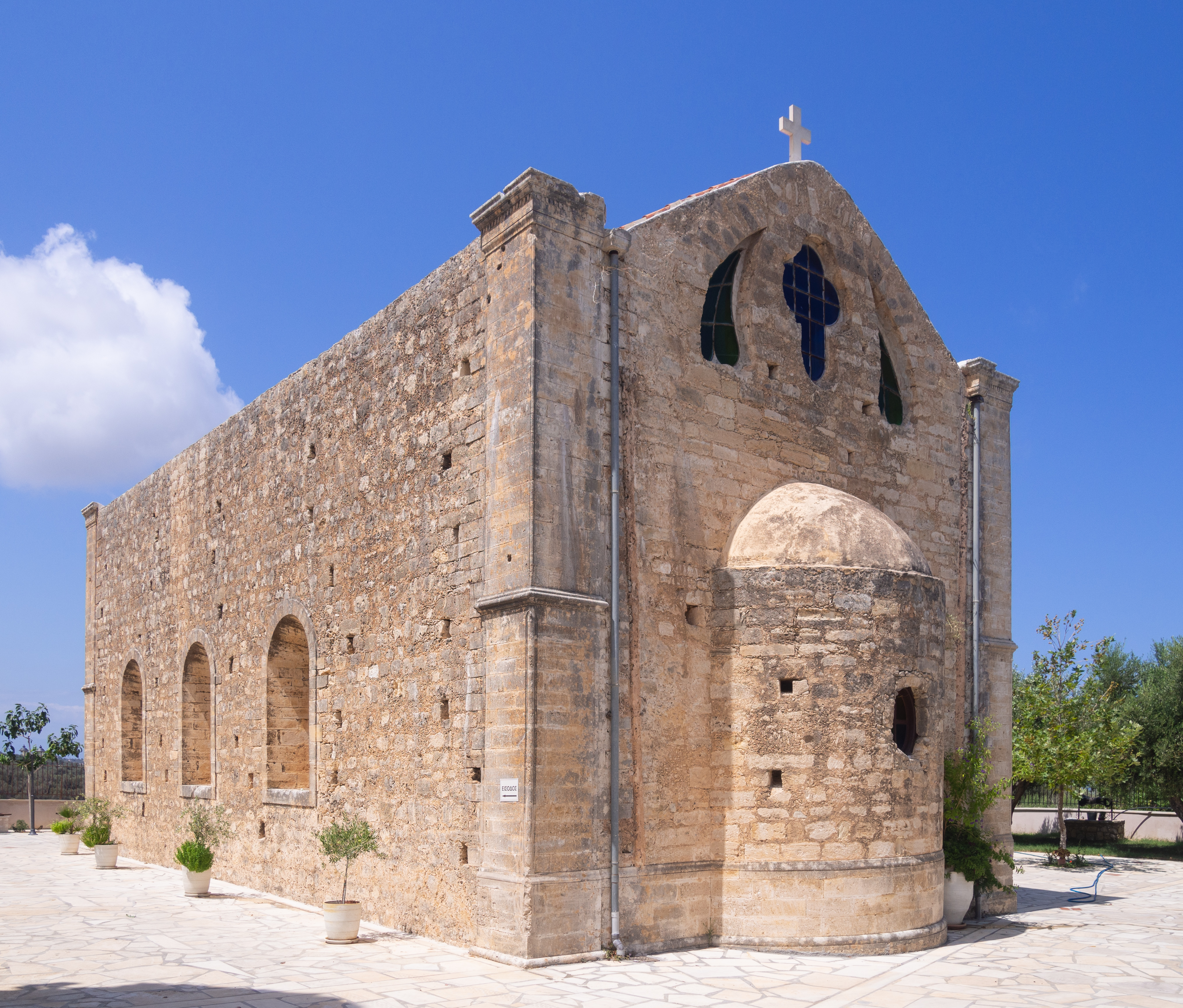
- The katholikon; observe the windows above the sanctuary

- Location of the former monastery, and extant katholikon, in Crete
- Interactive map of Halevi Monastery

Monastery information
- Order: Ecumenical Patriarchate of Constantinople
- Denomination: Greek Orthodox
- Dedication: Dormition of Virgin Mary
- Celebration: August 15: Dormition
- Archdiocese: Church of Crete

Architecture
- Status: Monastery (16th century–c. 1900); Katholikon
- Functional status: Abandoned (as a monastery); Active (as a church)
- Style: Byzantine
- Completed date: 16th century

Site
- Location: Chromonastiri, Rethymno, Crete
- Country: Greece
- Coordinates: 35°20′45″N 24°30′16″E

The Halevi Monastery (Greek: Μονή Χαλεβή), also spelled as the Chalevi Monastery, is a Greek Orthodox abandoned monastery and extant katholikon, located close to the village of Chromonastiri, in the Rethymno region in north-central Crete, Greece. The monastery stands on a hill, approximately 5 kilometres (3.1 mi) south of the city of Rethymno. Completed during the 16th-century, the complex ceased to function as a monastery near the end of the Ottoman occupation of Crete and only its principal church remains.

== History ==
The Halevi Monastery was founded in the 16th century when Crete was under Venetian rule and soon became stavropegic, i.e. directly answerable to the Patriarch of Constantinople. The monastery was erected upon the ruins of an old fortified establishment. It was dissolved around 1900 and latter became a metochion of the Arsani Monasteri. In 1980, it was listed as a preserved monument by the Greek state and in 1991 the convent was attached to the restored monastery of Agia Irini. The Halevi Monastery is deserted and its buildings are in ruins.

Only the single-aisled principal church (katholikon) of Theotokos is standing, known for its magnificent teardrop-shaped windows. Among the vestiges of the buildings are elements of the popular Cretan architecture of past centuries. Dedicated to the Dormition of Virgin Mary, the church celebrates on August 15 each year. According to an inscription, the katholikon of Halevi was reconstructed in 1864.

== See also ==
- Church of Crete
- List of Greek Orthodox monasteries in Greece
