= Kalo Chorio Oreinis =

Kalo Chorio: Καλό Χωριό (Greek); Kalo Horgo (Turkish)
- Village
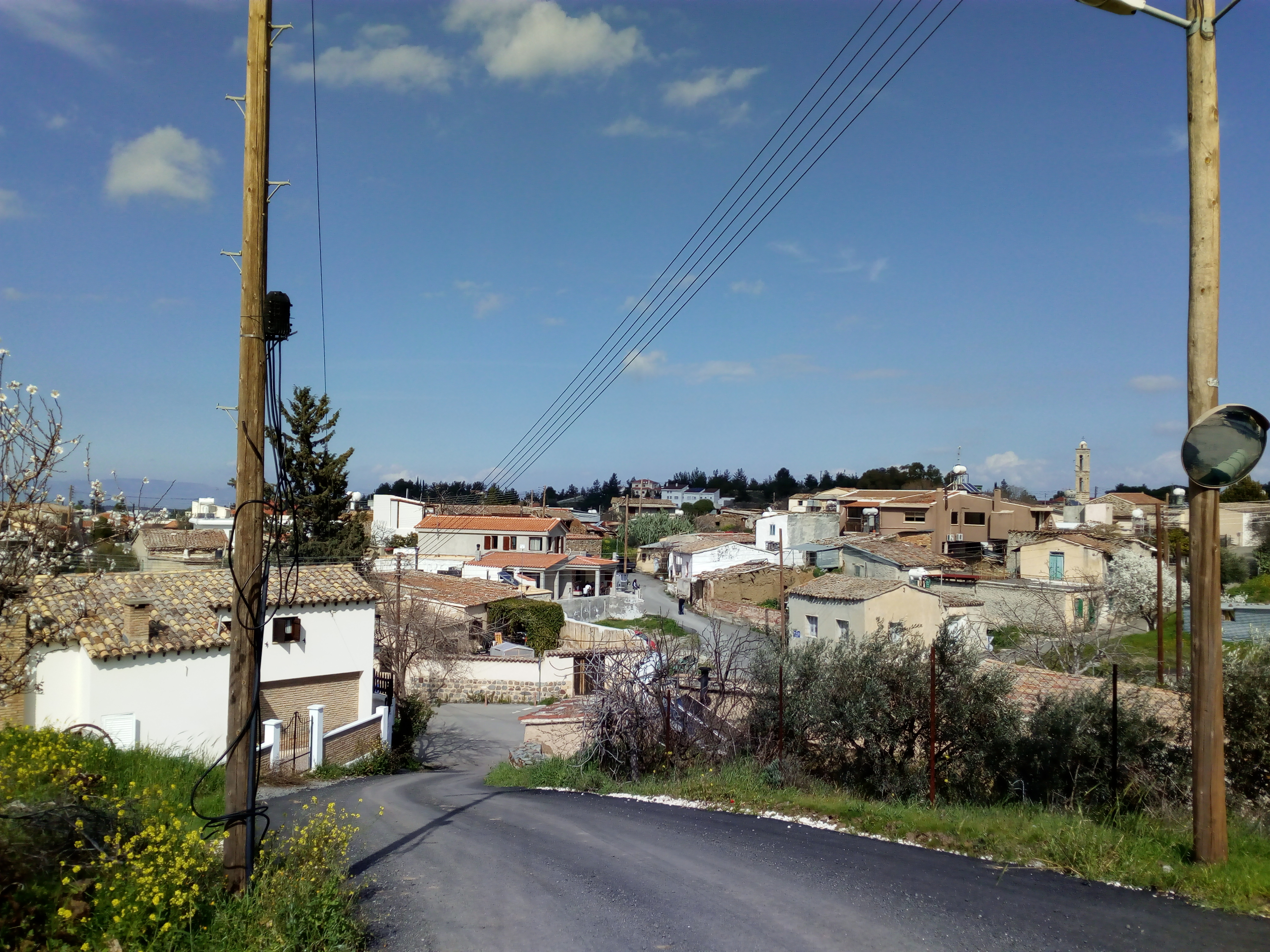

- Location in Cyprus
- Coordinates: 35°0′37″N 33°9′52″E
- Country: Cyprus
- District: Nicosia District

Population (2001)
  - Total: 601
- Time zone: UTC+2 (EET)
  - Summer (DST): UTC+3 (EEST)

Kalo Chorio Oreinis (Greek: Καλό Χωριό Ορεινής; Turkish: Kalo Horgo) is a village located in the Nicosia District of Cyprus, 3 km south of the town of Klirou.

== History ==
The village existence goes back as far as classical and Roman periods. According to the Cypriot historian Simos Menardos the old name of the village was dedicated to a pagan God. Evidence to that are the ruins of a temple and a remnant of an ancient altar on the site (Ζυθκιόνας). As practice of pagan religion was prohibited by law around 400 AD soldiers and clerics based in klirou garrison attacked and destroyed the temple. The villagers out of fear and with a gesture of genuflection welcome the marching army and clerics laying branches of shrubs call merika (Tamaricaceae). The clerics used that as an example when preaching Christianity hence the name came to existence (good village) kalo horio also known as (kalo horio merikas) and kalo horio klirous.

== Gallery ==
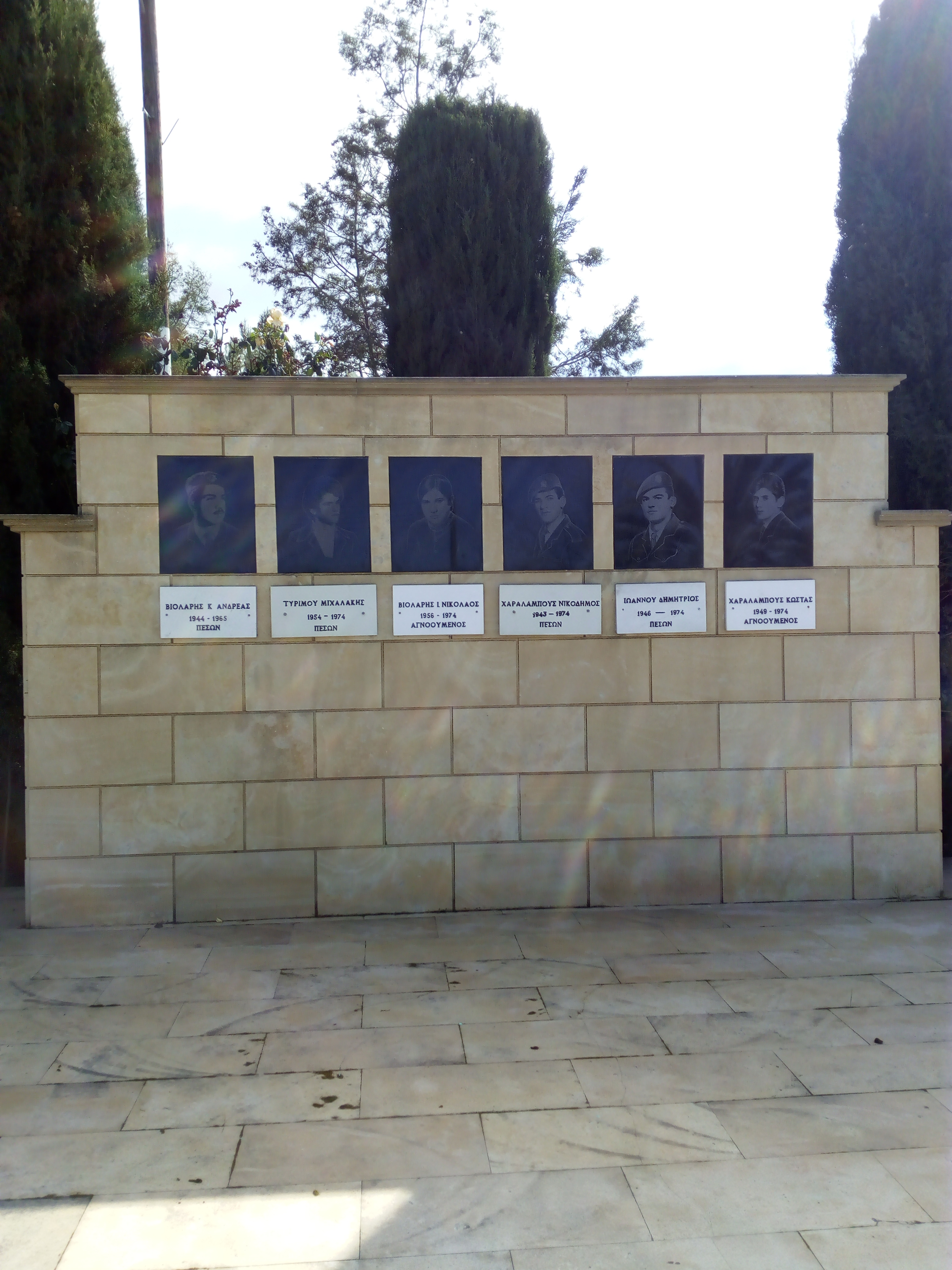
Monument in Kalo Chorio

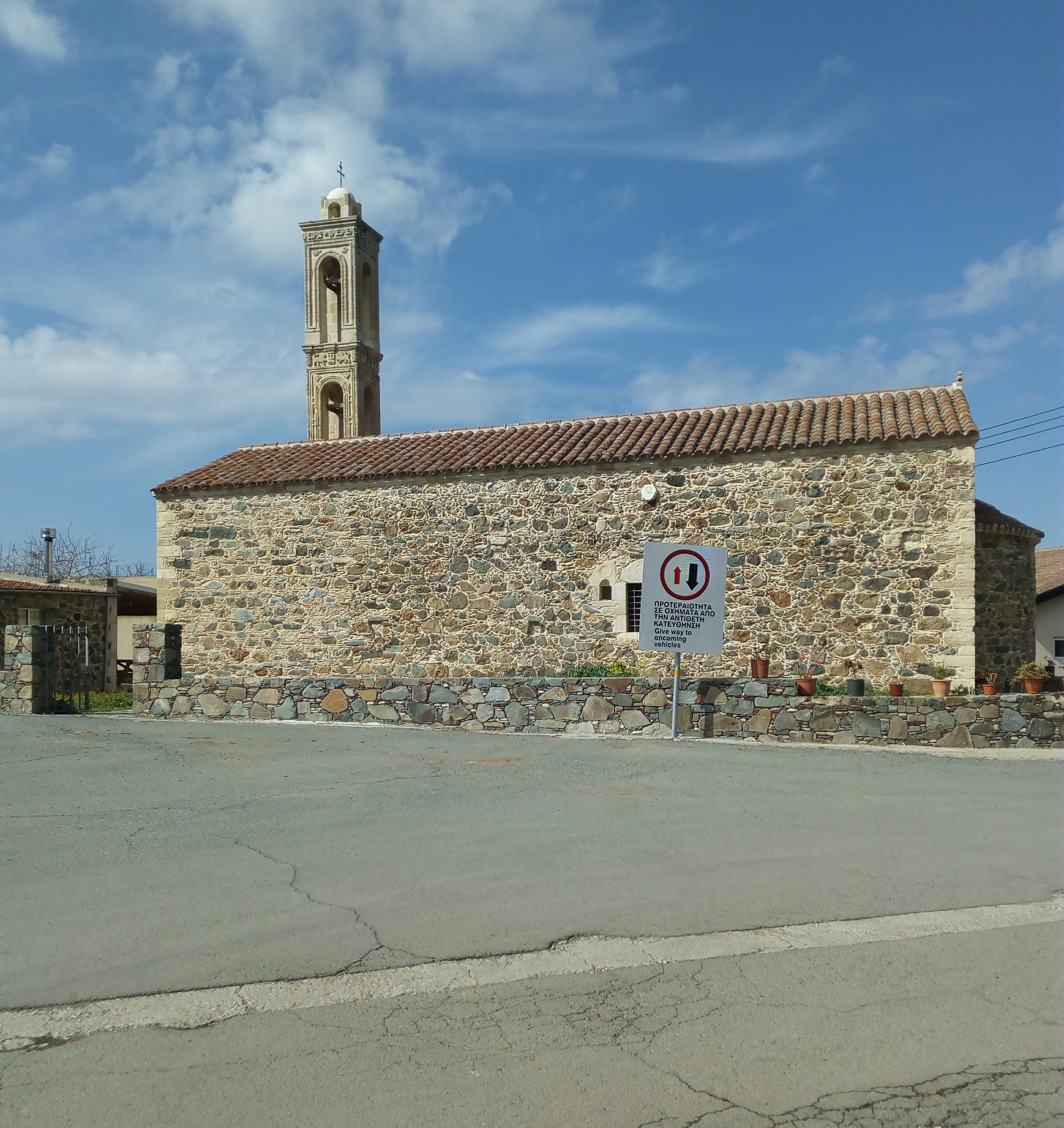
Old Church of Agios Georgios in Kalo Chorio Oreinis, Cyprus

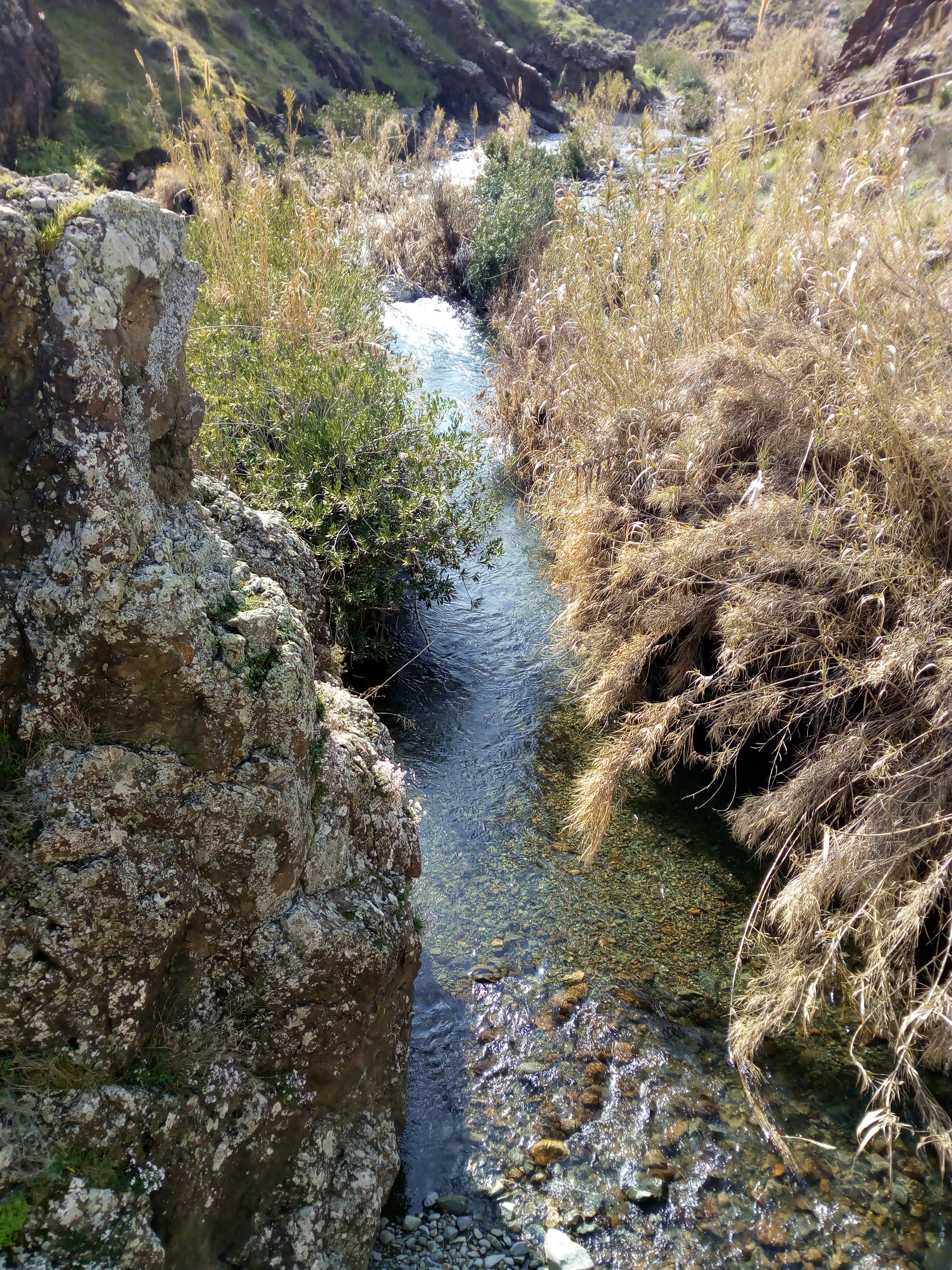
Maroullenas River
