= Myloi, Rethymno =

Myloi Μύλοι
- Settlement
- Location within Greece
- Coordinates: 35°20′N 24°30′E
- Country: Greece
- Administrative region: Crete
- Regional unit: Rethymno
- Municipality: Rethymno
- Municipal unit: Rethymno
- Community: Chromonastiri

Population (2021)
  - Total: 14
- Time zone: UTC+2 (EET)
  - Summer (DST): UTC+3 (EEST)
- Postal code: 74100
- Area code: 28310
- Vehicle registration: ΡΕ

Μyloi (Greek: Μύλοι, also transliterated as Myli, Mili or Muloi) is a part of the local community of Chromonastiri of the Rethymno Municipality in the Rethymno (regional unit) of the region of Crete established by Kallikratis reform. The capital of the new municipality is Rethymno.

Myli refers to both a village built in the early 1970s (“new Myli”) and to two deserted small villages with the same name (or referred as “ano Myli” and “Kato Myli”), remains of which can be found within the Gorge of Myli.

== Geography and History ==
Taking the road south of Chromonastiri will lead to the village of Myli after 1.5 kilometres, which leads to the gorge, where the village is situated. Its name is derived from the many water mills, which were once in operation. The village has abundant vegetation and a picturesque location. There are references that the area of Myli was occupied from the Ottoman period onwards, but there are many buildings, as well as remains from the Venetian period.

Population of Chromonastiri (and Myli in particular)

Settlement	1940	1951	1961	1971	1981	1991	2001
Myloi	99	75	52	36	39	31	39

== The Gorge of Myli ==
The gorge of Myli is ideal for walking, taking one hour to walk through. The gorge starts at Chromonastiri and ends at the village of Xiro Chorio. There is a small river in the gorge and the deserted old village of Myli, where there are samples of traditional architecture, old churches and caves.

== See also ==
List of settlements in the Rethymno regional unit
