= Fikardou =

Fikardou: Φυκάρδου (Greek); Fikardu (Turkish)
- Village
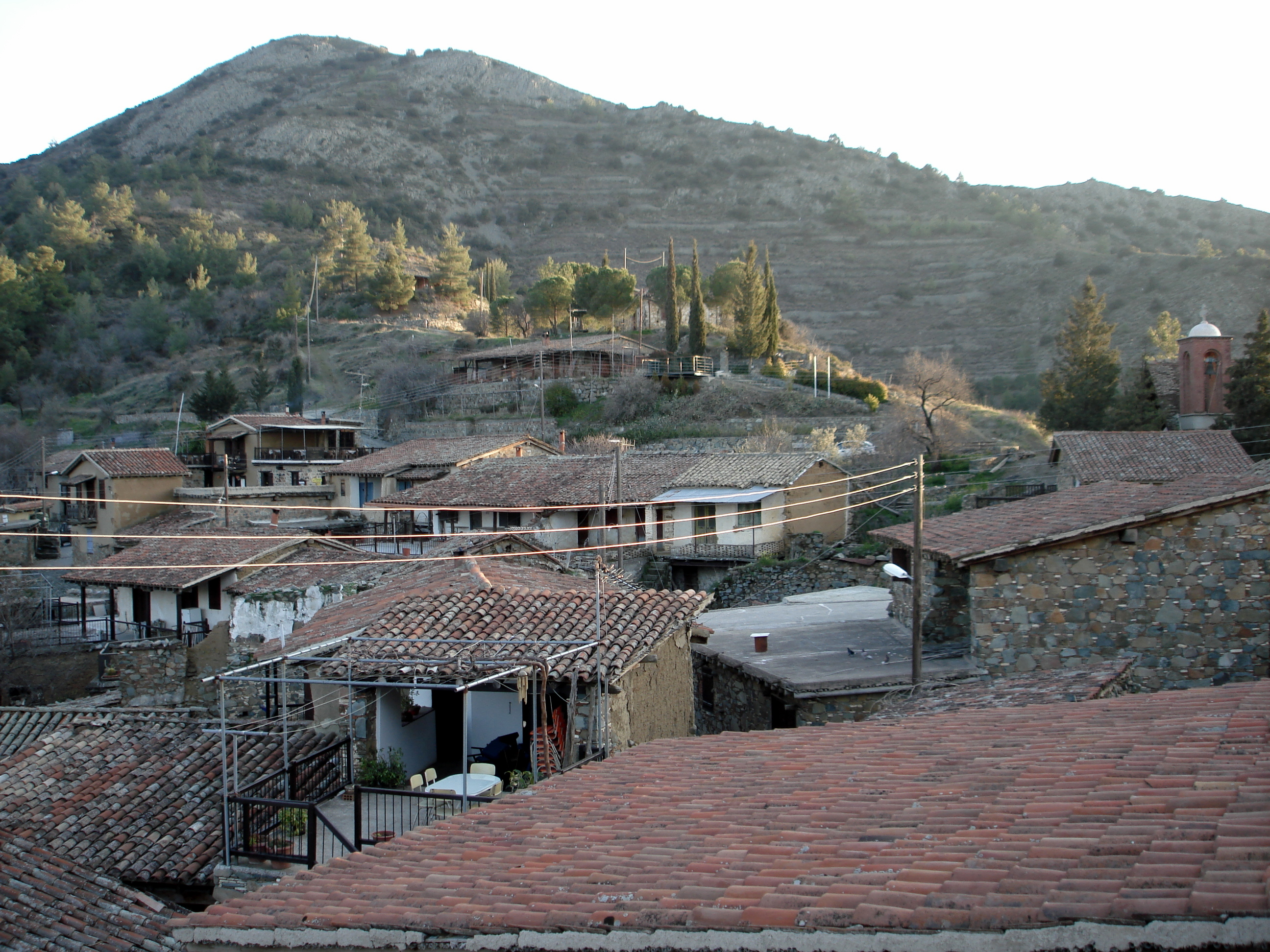
- View of the village

- Location in Cyprus
- Coordinates: 34°57′32″N 33°10′16″E
- Country: Cyprus
- District: Nicosia District

Population (2001)
  - Total: 3
- Time zone: UTC+2 (EET)
  - Summer (DST): UTC+3 (EEST)

Fikardou (Greek: Φυκάρδου; Turkish: Fikardu) is an old settlement that has retained its traditional medieval characteristics. It is situated on the north eastern slopes of the Troodos Mountains, approximately 40 km southwest of Nicosia. The village today is almost deserted. It is connected by two roads, one from Klirou and the other of Kalo Chorio Klirou. Nearby are also the traditional Lazanias village and the Machairas Monastery. The village is owned by the Department of Antiquities. It has been proposed as a candidate for a World Heritage Site.

== History ==
Between 400AD – 800AD there was a lot of turmoil in the island's history due to anti-pagan legislations and Arab invasions. This led to dissident groups forming to avoid oppression and establish the rule of the sword as the basic tool for survival in this mountainous region. The original name of the Makhairas mountains came from the Greek term “to fight”.

According to legend, the region was controlled by two dominant clans: the Kourries from the Kourion area (in control of the East side of the mountain) and the Braves from the Tamassos area (who were in control of the West side of the mountain). In 700 AD a large number of Cypriots who were war prisoners repatriated from Cyzicus Propontis joined and strengthened the power of the fugitive groups in the region, forcing the government to pardon these outlaws.

The name of Fikardou village was, according to this version, taken from the Greek: φυγά ανδρείου: fugitive braves' clan: Fikanrdrou. A more plausible etymology would perhaps be φυγά άνδρον: den of fugitives.

However, historical research points to a different origin: the family name of the feudal overlords of the area, dating back to Lusignan times. The earliest mention of the family is found after the 1450s. In 1473 Thomas Fikardos is mentioned as the royal chancellor present at the deathbed of James II. He is believed to be the patriarch of the family associated with the feudal history of the village. Indeed, many villages in Cyprus are former feudal holdings with names traceable to the Franks, Venetians and others, namely the nearby villages of Gourri (Urry family), and Lazania (Lusignan).In any case, this version is extremely unlikely to be exact, as the village administratively belonged to Machairas Monastery, during Komnenos dynasty (1081–1185). According to Monastery sources in that period, fruits and olive-tree plantations had been established in its fiefdom of Lythrodontas and one of the main profitable activities of the Fikardou inhabitants were the harvesting Olea oleaster (young wild olive trees) from the forest. The Knights Templar administrated most of the region of Pitsilia from 1195 to 1310. With the criminal prosecutions of the Templars as heretics The Knights of St. John inherited their privileges including Fikardou.

== Gallery ==
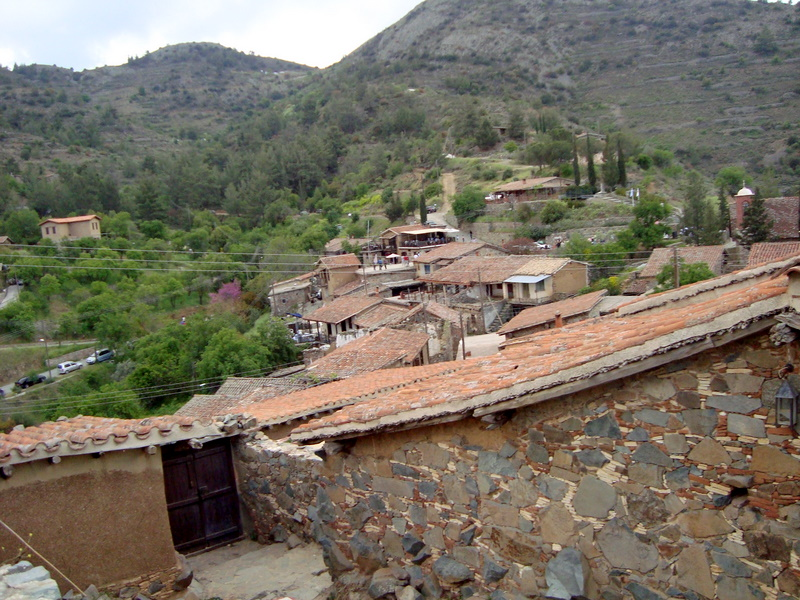
Mountain view of Fikardou

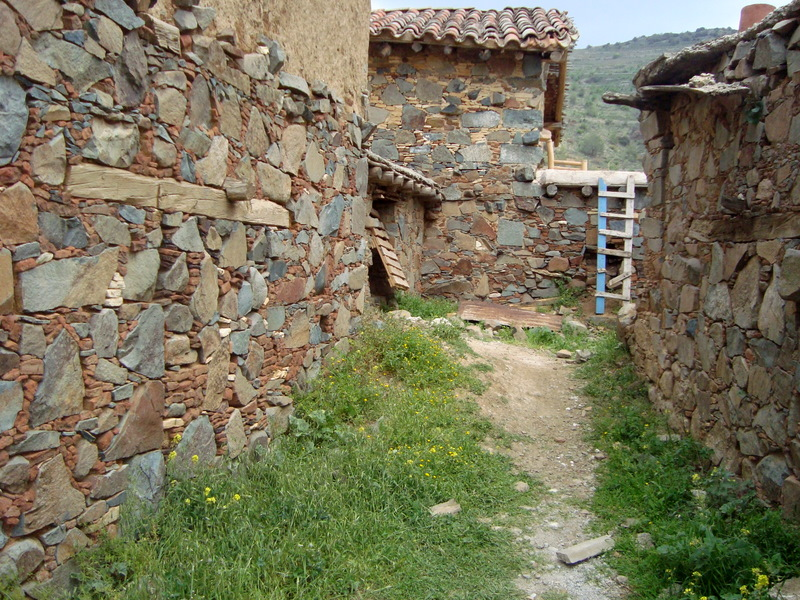
Fikardou is one of the most picturised villages of Cyprus
