= Chromonastiri =

Chromonastiri Χρωμοναστήρι
- Community
- Location within Greece
- Coordinates: 35°20′N 24°31′E
- Country: Greece
- Administrative region: Crete
- Regional unit: Rethymno
- Municipality: Rethymno
- Municipal unit: Rethymno

Area
  - Community: 9.604 km^{2} (3.708 sq mi)

Population (2021)
  - Community: 360
  - Density: 37/km^{2} (97/sq mi)
- Time zone: UTC+2 (EET)
  - Summer (DST): UTC+3 (EEST)
- Postal code: 74100
- Area code: 28310
- Vehicle registration: ΡΕ

Chromonastiri is a local community of the Rethymno Municipality in the Rethymno (regional unit) of the region of Crete established by Kallikratis reform. Previously, it was part of the former municipality of Rethymno. Chromonastiri is a traditional settlement and is classified in Class II, that is of average cultural value (Government Gazette 728/21-9-1995). Buildings with Venetian architectural elements are scattered throughout the village. In the years 2005, 2007, 2008 and 2009 Chromonastiri received an award of the '"cleaner and organized traditional community"'

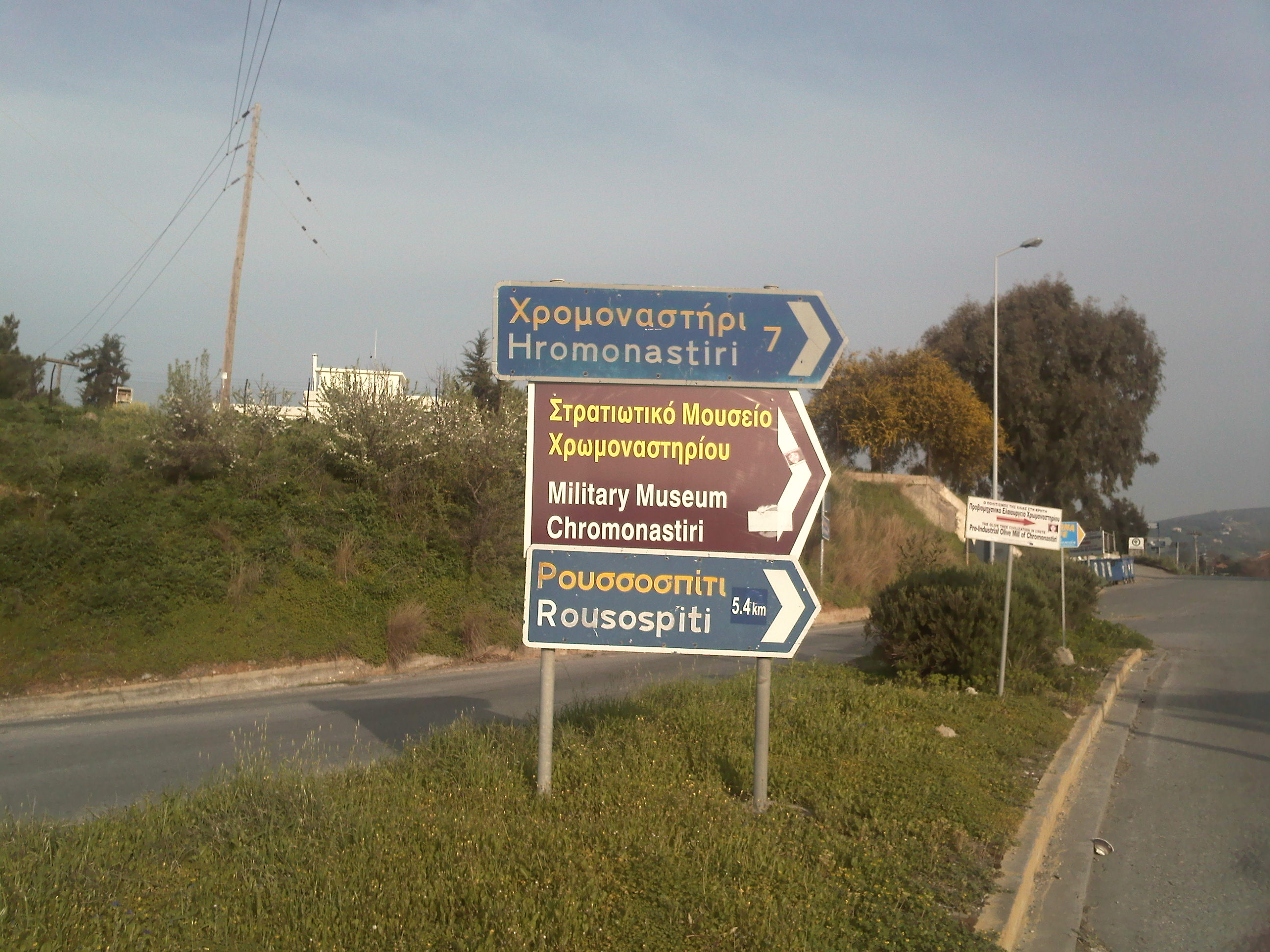
sign to Chromonastiri, the War Museum and Roussospiti

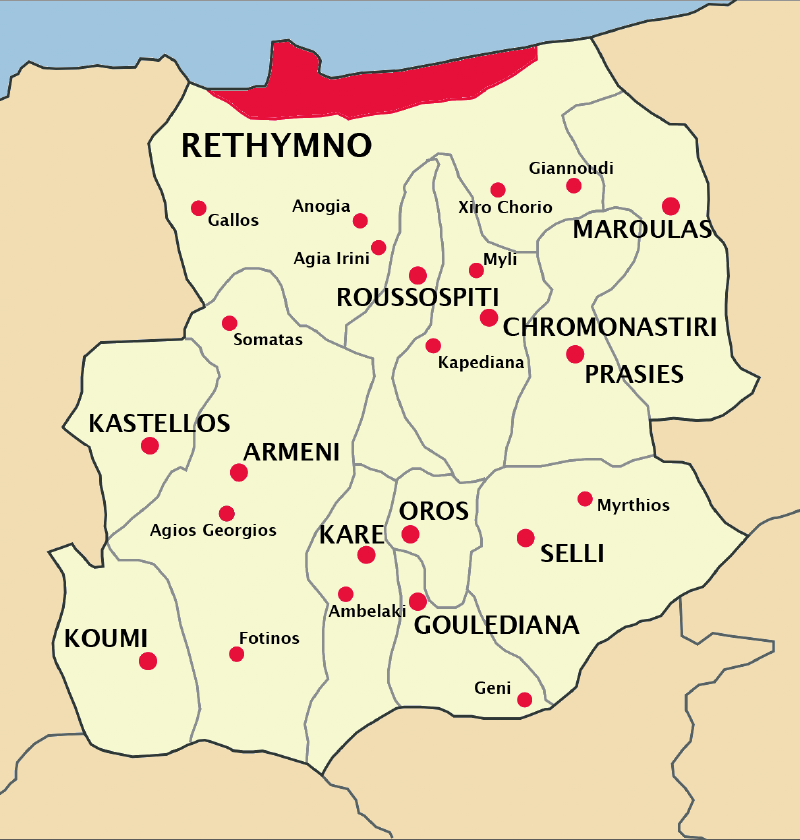
The settlements of the former municipality of Rethymno

== Origin of name, History ==
Chromonastiri is located 11 km southeast of Rethymno, east of the Mount Vrisinas at an altitude of 360 meters The name means “Color and Monastery”, and probably this name comes by the coexistence of the village and the monastery of Panayía Kerá (back to the Second Byzantine and Venetian period). Built around the 12th-13th centuries and has been characterized as a traditional village, as several buildings were built during the Venetian period. The local community of Chromonastiri consists of four settlements: Chromonastiri, Prinedes (Πρινέδες), Kapediana (Καπεδιανά) and Myloi (Μύλοι).

Population of Chromonastiri

| Settlement | 1940 | 1951 | 1961 | 1971 | 1981 | 1991 | 2001 | 2011 | 2021 |
|---|---|---|---|---|---|---|---|---|---|
| Chromonastiri | 439 | 347 | 293 | 173 | 294 | 237 | 358 | 298 | 297 |
| Kapediana | 102 | 64 | 48 | 35 | 27 | 19 | 28 | 25 | 13 |
| Myloi | 99 | 75 | 52 | 36 | 39 | 31 | 39 | 27 | 14 |
| Prinedes | - | - | - | - | - | 29 | 57 | 41 | 36 |
| Total | 640 | 486 | 393 | 244 | 360 | 316 | 482 | 391 | 360 |

== Temples, monuments, and major buildings ==
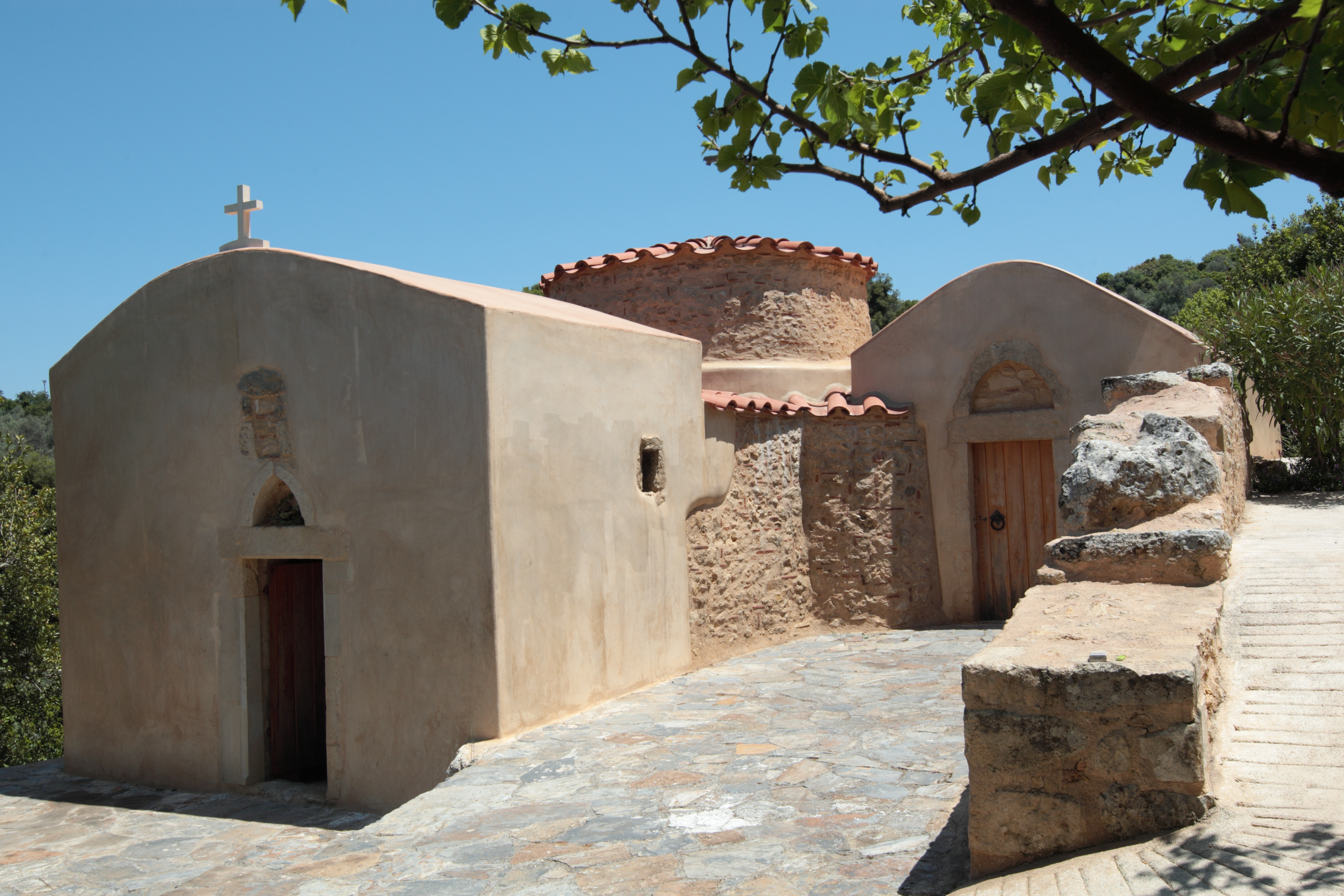
The Church of Panayía Kerá

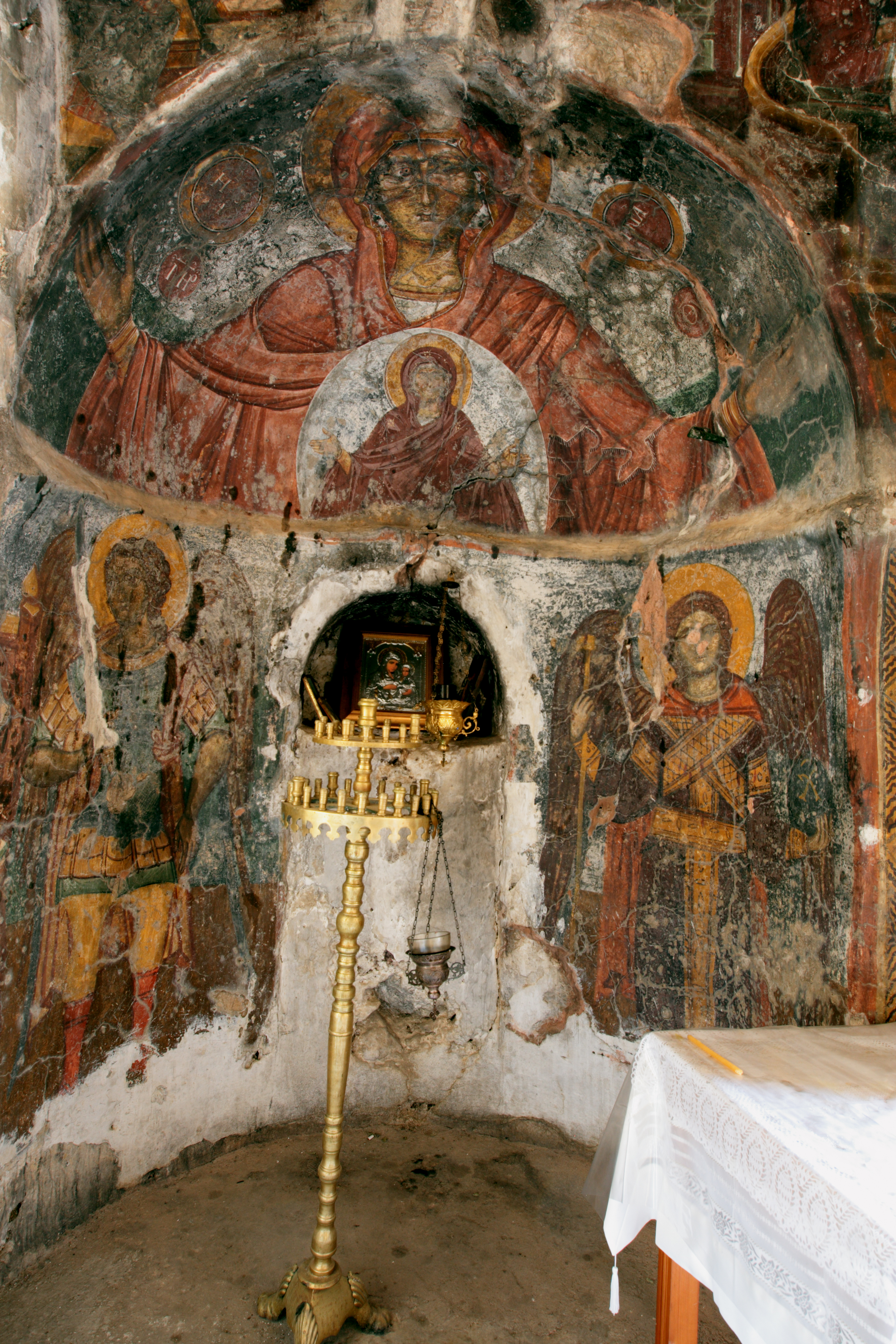
Icons within the Church of Panayía Kerá

The Church of Panayía Kerá is a painted Byzantine church of cruciform shape with a dome, dating from the 11th century, with frescoes of 14th century.

Halevi Monastery, located near Chromonastiri, is an abandoned 16th-century monastery from which only the principal church remains.

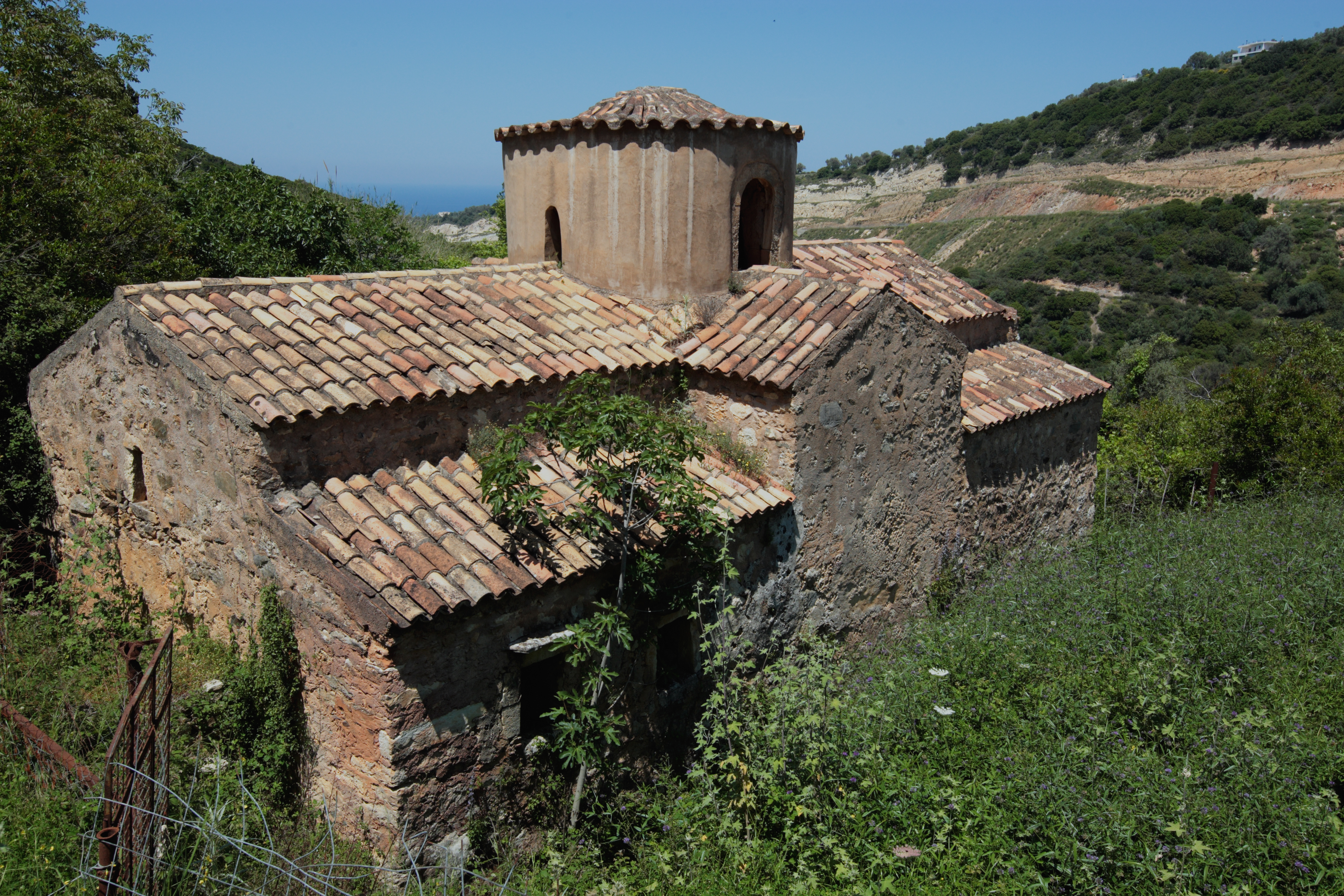
The Church of Ayios Eftychios

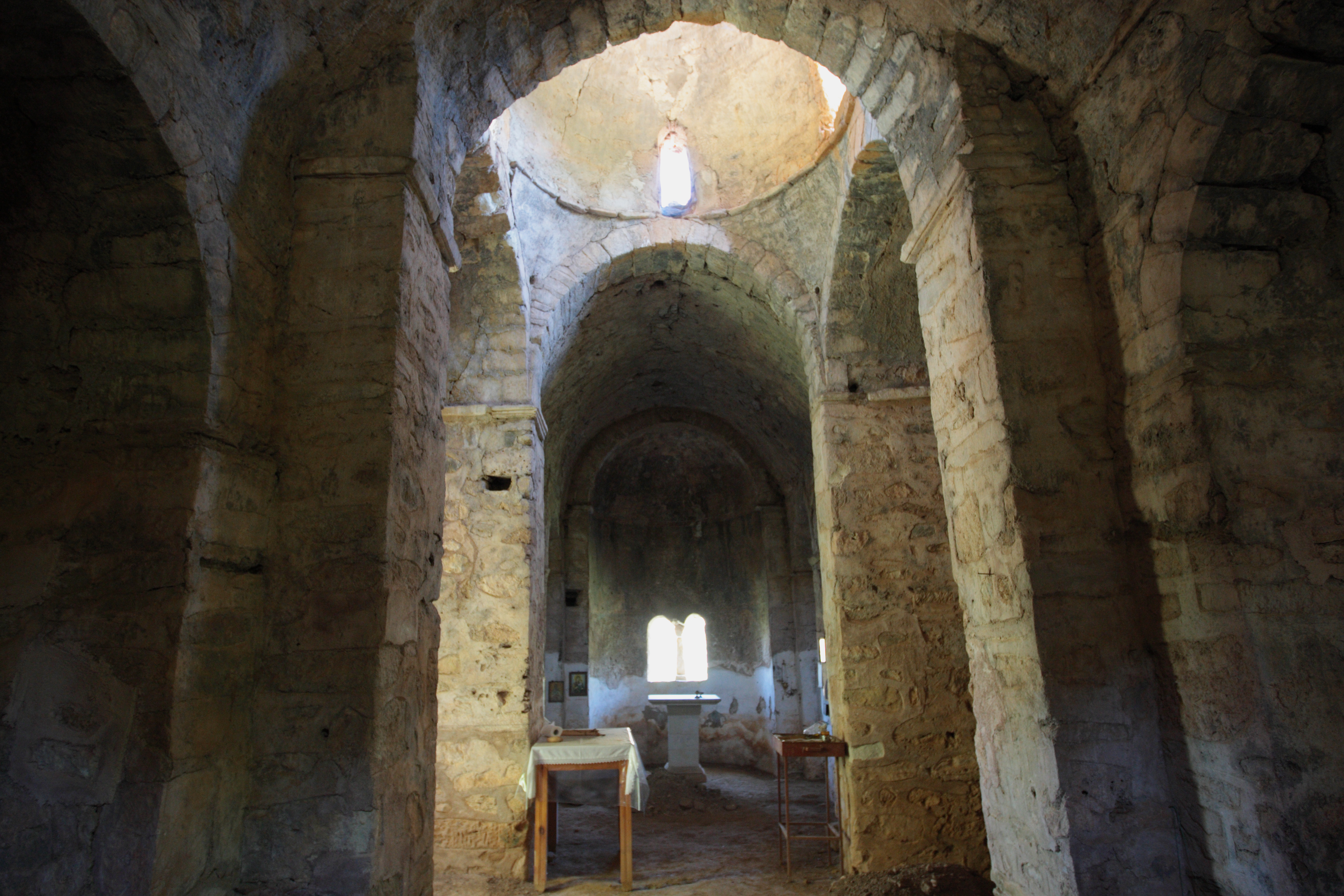
The Church of Ayios Eftychios, interior

Another important Byzantine church of the 11th century - that of Ayios Eftychios - is situated outside Chromonastiri at the area called Perdíki Metóhi, again with amazing frescoes of the 11th century (amazing are the huge eyes of the saints and especially of Christ)

The Parish Church of this settlement is St. George Church.

Villa Clodio: Buildings with Venetian architectural elements are scattered in the village, but the most important building is the so-called Villa Clodio, which used to be the summer residence of Venetian nobles from Rethymno and in the Ottoman period it was a house of an Ottoman dignitary (konak). It is a magnificent mansion which has been restored and houses the Military Museum. The Military Museum houses many exhibits - military uniforms, weapons of various ages, decorations, etc.

The oil mill of Prinari: The old factory (oil mill) of Prinari, fully renovated, with all its old equipment, located in the settlement, welcomes visitors to its cultural learning centre for an experience to learn all things relating to the olive and its milling process.

== Daily life, Festivities ==
The village celebrates Saint Panteleimon's name day (27 July)

== Miscellaneous ==
There is public bus service (KTEL) from Rethymno (two services, morning and noon on weekdays and not weekends)

Since 7 July 2005 the area of Chromonastiri is included in the Cadastre system and is under the authority of the Cadastral Office of Rethymno (20 Hortatzis Str., ZIP: 74100, Rethymno, Phone n.: 0030-28310-22403)

== See also ==
List of settlements in the Rethymno regional unit
