= Klirou =

Village in Nicosia District, Cyprus

Klirou: Kλήρου (Greek); Kliru (Turkish)
- Village (Community)
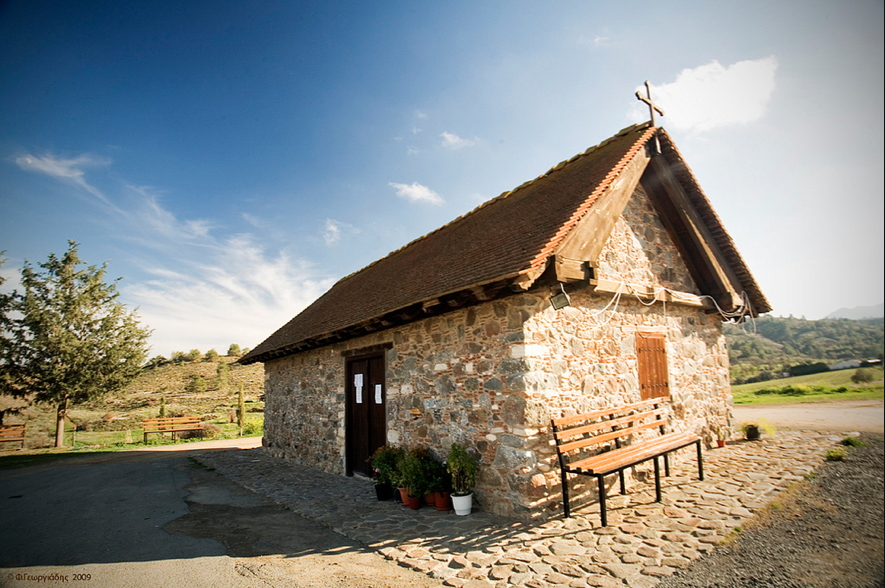
- Lachni chapel in Klirou. (The place name derived from the Achaean tribe)

- Location in Cyprus
- Coordinates: 35°1′13″N 33°10′39″E
- Country: Cyprus
- District: Nicosia District

Area
  - Total: 7.2 sq mi (18.7 km^{2})
- Elevation: 1,198 ft (365 m)

Population (2021)
  - Total: 1,895
- Time zone: UTC+2 (EET)
  - Summer (DST): UTC+3 (EEST)
- Postal code: 2600

Klirou (Greek: Kλήρου, Turkish: Kliru) is a Historic Mining District and covers an area of 18.7 square kilometers. Klirou residents are known for their wealth and political influence. Situated in the northern foothills of the Troodos Mountains, 26 km southwest of Nicosia. The area was inhabited from the Late Bronze Age, by Arcadocypriot Greek settlers

== History ==
Klirou was an integral part of Ancient Tamassos Kingdom as it was a copper production district, dotted with hundreds of mines and dozens of smelting - furnace sites. According to Strabo the Tamasos kingdom had silver mines at the Kouloupas area. During Roman times, the mining industry in Cyprus was run by the Procurator (Roman). From the 2nd to 5th century Klirou village wasn't the village it is today, but rather a complex of more than ten villages with a mixed population of mostly Greeks and Jews within the districts. In the centre of Klirou was a 3 kilometer long underground water supply tunnel and two large water storage units, on the site known as Λίμνή (lake). There is evidence of ancient burial pits containing many skulls, which could indicate mass war graves dating back to Roman times. Some sources say that the Jewish villages were abandoned or destroyed during the Kitos War.

It appears that its name was taken during the period of transition to Christianity, from the clerics accompanying the Roman army and stationed in Klirou in 390 A.D. preaching Christianity, and observing anti-pagan laws. During that period all people living in the area had to go to Klirou and declare themselves as Christians in order to have rights in court law, property, and possessions. As they use to say "we are going to the see the clerics" (Κληρικους). Hence the name Klirou came into existence.

According to the local version of myth, at around (650 - 700 A.D.). A military unit of Arabs, with the mission to conquer Pitsilia, had been decimated by a severe hail storm in the area Klirou - Fikardou. The commander and a few soldiers sought refuge in the small chapel of Lachni. The officer sensed the connection of the storm with the sanctity of the place and made a vow to rebuild the chapel, if the storm calms, which was done. The same source reports that this military officer, although he was later promoted to an adviser of the Umayyad Caliphate in Syria, rebuilt and often visited the chapel.

At the Frankish (Lusignan Dynasty) (1200-1490) Klirou was Montolipho's family fiefdom. Amongst (1294-1310) Simon de Montolipho was one of the leaders of the Templars in Cyprus. In 1308 the Pope ordered the arrest of all Templars, to the island. Amalric, Lord of Tyre was ruling Cyprus at the time and had overthrown his brother Henry II of Jerusalem (and Cyprus), with the help of the Templars. The Templars blamed Amalric for the arrests and commissioned Simon for the job. Simon manned his team with trusted men from Klirou and dressed as stable servants, ambushed the regency in the village of Pentageia disarming his guards. Simon beheaded the regency in a duel and removed his royal necklace. Simon's accomplices demanded the regency's ring and Simon de Montolipho cut the right hand of Amalric and they took it with them. Recognizing the services offered to her son, his mother Laura, gifted in seven families land estates, which became known as Laoura in Klirou.
