= Xiro Chorio =

Hamlet in Crete, Greece

Coordinates: 35.350963°N 24.512563°E

Xiro Chorio (Greek: Ξηρό Χωριό) is a hamlet of approximately 170 residents, which is part of Rethymno (municipality), capital of the Rethymno regional unit on the island of Crete, Greece.

It is a few kilometers north of Chromonastiri.

== Overview ==
The hamlet features access to the Mili (also Myloi and Miloi) Greek: Μύλοι) Gorge, which leads to the Venetian village of the same name, abandoned for unknown reasons over 100 years ago, and to the Byzantine chapel of St. Anthony. It also features St. Mark's chapel, which is one of only two in Crete honoring St. Mark.

The hamlet's name consists of two Greek words, "Xiro", meaning dry, and "Chorio", meaning village. As the hamlet is adjacent to two large creeks, most residents attribute the location's name to its distinctly dry climate, as opposed to a lack of water.

Xiro Chorio's roots are pre-Ottoman, as it is listed by the name of Chirochorion in Venetian land and population surveys. In 1901, prior to Crete's union with Greece, Xiro Chorio was listed in the Turkish census as having exactly 100 residents, 99 of whom were of the "Musulman faith" and one of the "Greek Orthodox". In 1922, the population exchange between Greece and Turkey that resulted from the War in Asia Minor, 1919-1922, caused the Cretan Muslems of Xiro Chorio to be displaced to what is today Turkey, and the village to be inhabited by Eastern Orthodox Christians who in turn had been displaced from Turkey.

The majority of residents of Xiro Chorio trace their roots to Asia Minor. During the past decade, new houses have been built in the hamlet and have been occupied by non-Greek citizens of the European Union.
