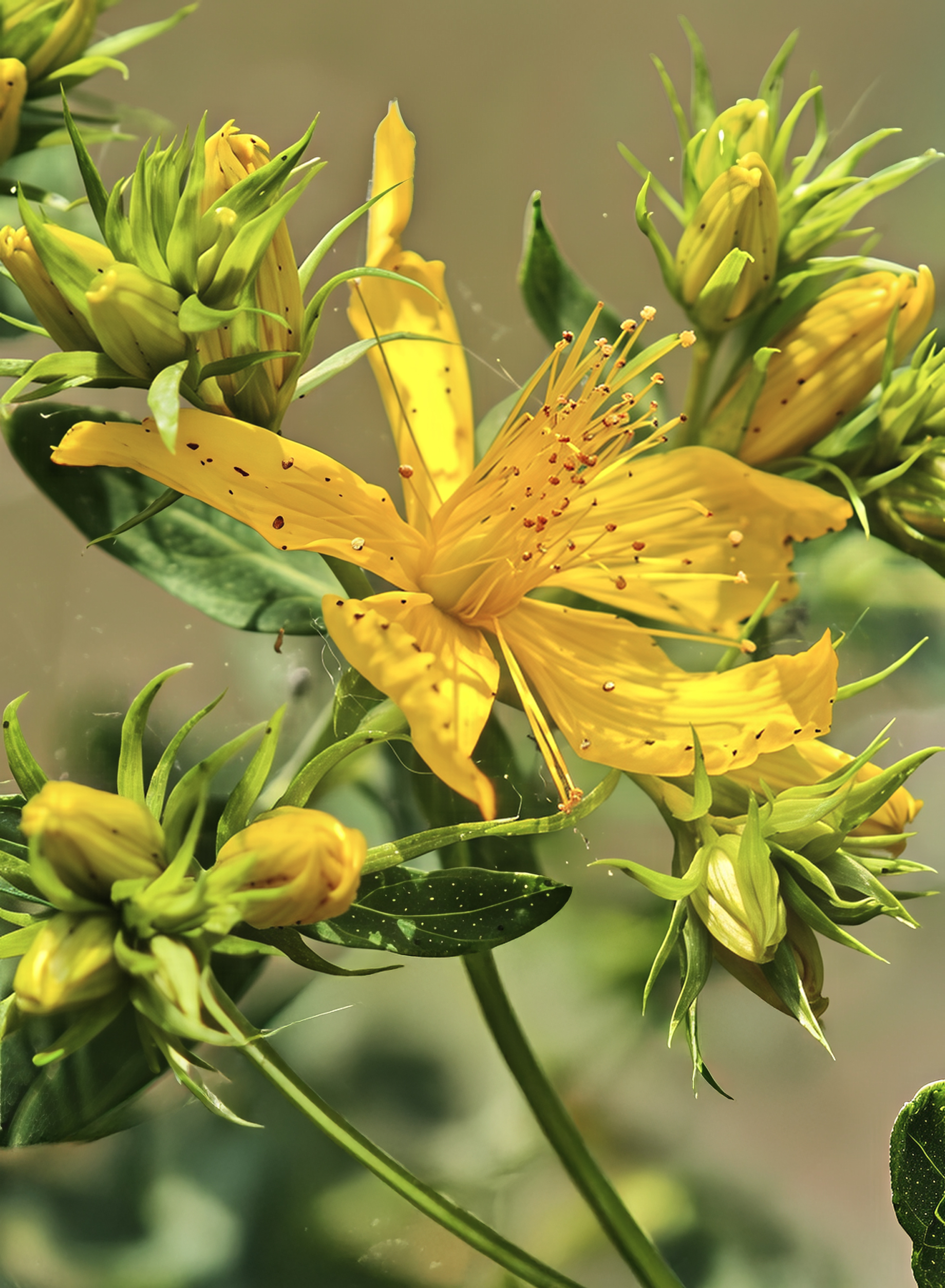

Scientific classification
- Kingdom: Plantae
- Clade: Tracheophytes
- Clade: Angiosperms
- Clade: Eudicots
- Clade: Rosids
- Order: Malpighiales
- Family: Hypericaceae
- Genus: Hypericum
- Section: Hypericum sect. Hypericum
- Species: H. perforatum

Binomial name
- Hypericum perforatum L.

Subspecies
- H. p. ssp. perforatum; H. p. ssp. songaricum (Ledeb. ex Rchb.) N.Robson; H. p. ssp. veronense (Ledeb. ex Rchb.) N.Robson; H. p. ssp. chinense (Schrank) H.Lindb.

Synonyms
- H. officinale Gaterau; H. officinarum Crantz; H. vulgare Lam.

= Hypericum perforatum =

Flowering plant in the St John's wort family

Hypericum perforatum, commonly known as St. John's wort (sometimes perforate St. John's wort or common St. John's wort), is a flowering plant in the family Hypericaceae. It is a hairless, perennial herb with woody roots, yellow flowers marked by black glands, and leaves that appear perforated due to translucent glands, producing thousands of seeds per plant.

H. perforatum is the type species of its genus, known for its historical use in folklore and traditional medicine. Probably a hybrid between the closely related H. attenuatum and H. maculatum (imperforate St. John's wort) that originated in Siberia, the species has spread worldwide. It can further hybridize with related species due to its allopolyploid nature. It is native to much of Europe, West and Central Asia, and parts of Africa and China and has been widely introduced elsewhere, thriving in well-drained, temperate habitats such as meadows, hillsides, and open woods with moderate rainfall and mild temperatures. It is a resilient, toxic, and invasive plant that reproduces sexually and vegetatively, supports specialized insect herbivores, suffers from plant diseases, and poses ecological and agricultural threats in many parts of the world.

H. perforatum has been used for centuries in traditional medicine, especially for treating wounds and depression. To prepare it for use, the oil from its glands can be extracted or its above-ground parts can be dried and ground into a powder called herba hyperici. H. perforatum exhibits antidepressant effects comparable to drugs with fewer side effects for mild to moderate depression (for which it is approved in the European Union); however, it may interact with various medications by accelerating their metabolism.

== Description ==
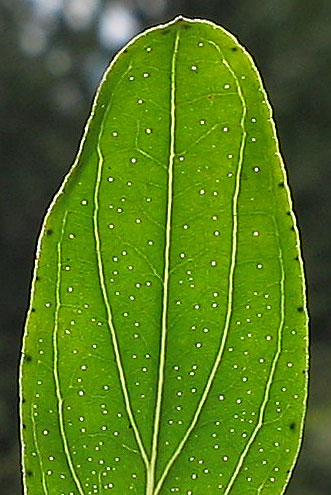
Leaf showing translucent glands and dark glands near the edges

Hypericum perforatum is an herbaceous perennial plant with hairless (glabrous) stems and leaves. The root of each plant is slender and woody with many small, fibrous small side roots and also extensive, creeping rhizomes. The central root grows to a depth of 0.6–1.5 metres (2 ft 0 in – 4 ft 11 in) into the soil depending on conditions. The crown of the root is woody.

Its stems are erect and branched in the upper section, and usually range from 0.3 metres to 1 metre in height. The stems are woody near their base and look like they have segmented joints from the scars left behind after the leaves fall off. The stems of H. perforatum are rusty-yellow to rosy in color with two distinct edges and usually have bark that sheds near the base. The stems persist through the winter and sprout new growth with flower buds in the following year; first year growth does not produce flowers.

It has leaves that attach on opposite sides of the stems without a stalk (sessile). The leaves vary in shape from being very narrow and almost grass-like (linear), to a rounded oval slightly wider at the base with a rounded tip or not much of a tip (elliptic), or even narrow with the widest portion towards the end of the leaf like a reversed lance point, but still long and narrow (oblanceolate). The principal leaves range in length from 0.8 to 3.5 centimetres and 0.31–1.6 centimetres in width. Leaves borne on the branches subtend the shortened branchlets. The leaves are yellow-green in color, with scattered translucent dots of glandular tissue. The dots are clearly visible when held up to the light, giving the leaves a perforated appearance. The edges (margins) of the leaves usually have scattered black dots, often called dark glands, though sometimes they will appear away from the edges. The odor of the plant is faint, but aromatic, resembling that of resins like balsam. The taste of the plant is bitter and acrid.

=== Flowering characteristics ===
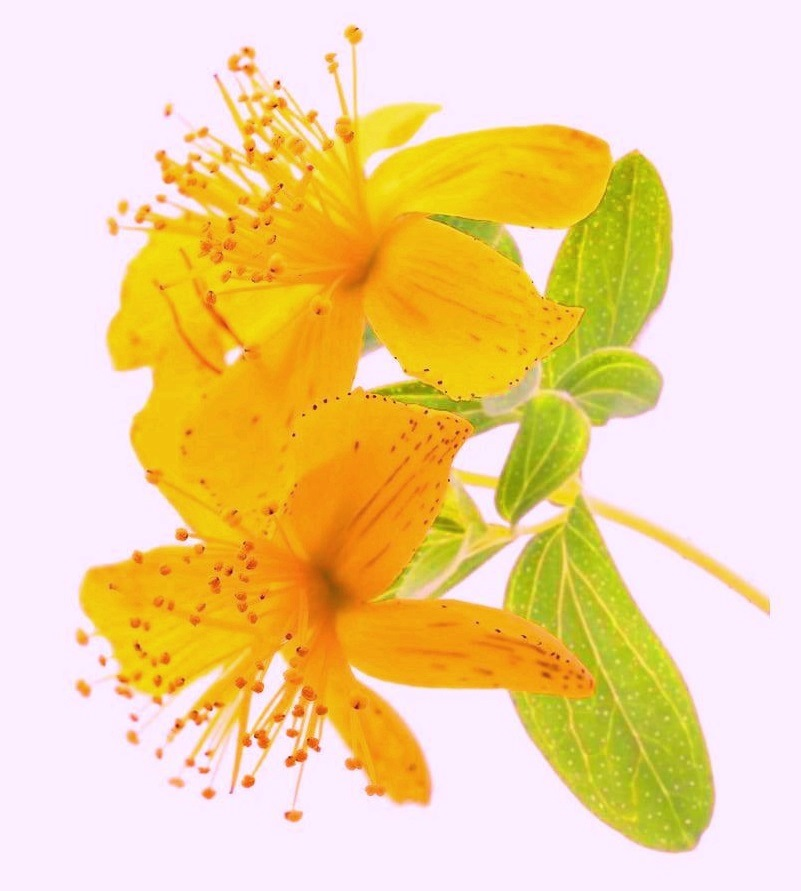
Blossom showing black colored dark glands at the edges of the petals

The flowers are conspicuous and showy, measuring about 1.5–2.5 cm (0.59–0.98 in) across, and are bright yellow with black dots along the edges of the petals. Each of the flowers normally has five large petals and five smaller leaf-like sepals below them. The sepals are about 4–5 mm (0.16–0.20 in) in length, green in color, are shaped like the head of a spear (lanceolate shape) with a pointed tip, and the same clear and black glands as the leaves. The petals are significantly longer, 8–12 mm (0.31–0.47 in) in length, and have an oblong shape. They completely hide the sepals from the front side of the flower. The many bright yellow stamens are united at the base into three bundles. The stalk portion of the stamens, the filaments, vary in length and stick out in every direction from the center of the flower. The pollen grains are pale brown to orange in color. Each flowering stem bears many flowers, between 25 and 100, and also is quite leafy.

The fruit of Hypericum perforatum is a capsule 7–8 mm (0.28–0.31 in) in length containing the seeds in three valved chambers. Seeds that are separated from the capsules have a much higher germination rate due to an inhibiting factor in the capsule itself. The black and lustrous seeds are rough, netted with coarse grooves. Each seed is about 1 mm (0.039 in) in size. Each plant may produce an average of 15,000 to 34,000 seeds.

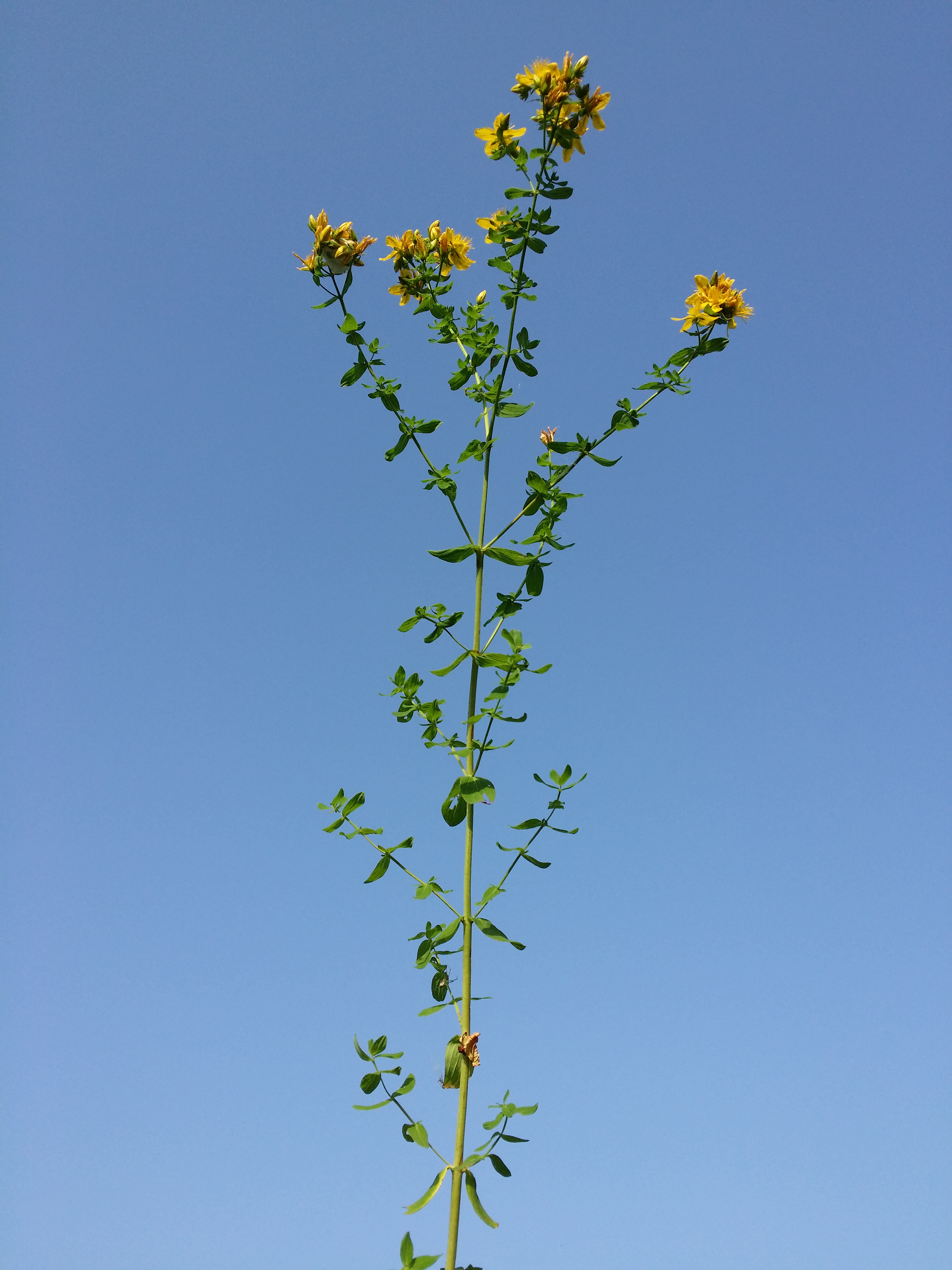
Full plant

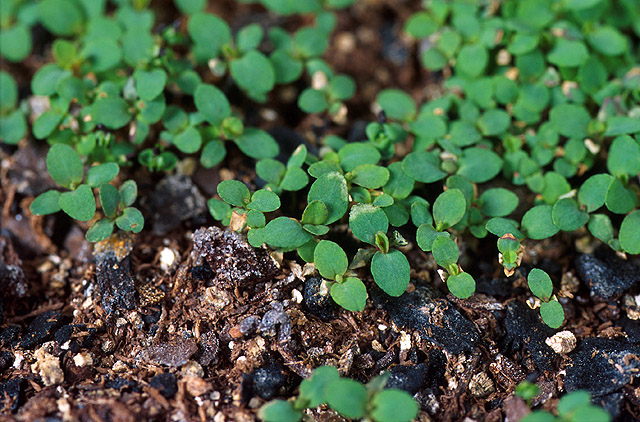
Seedlings

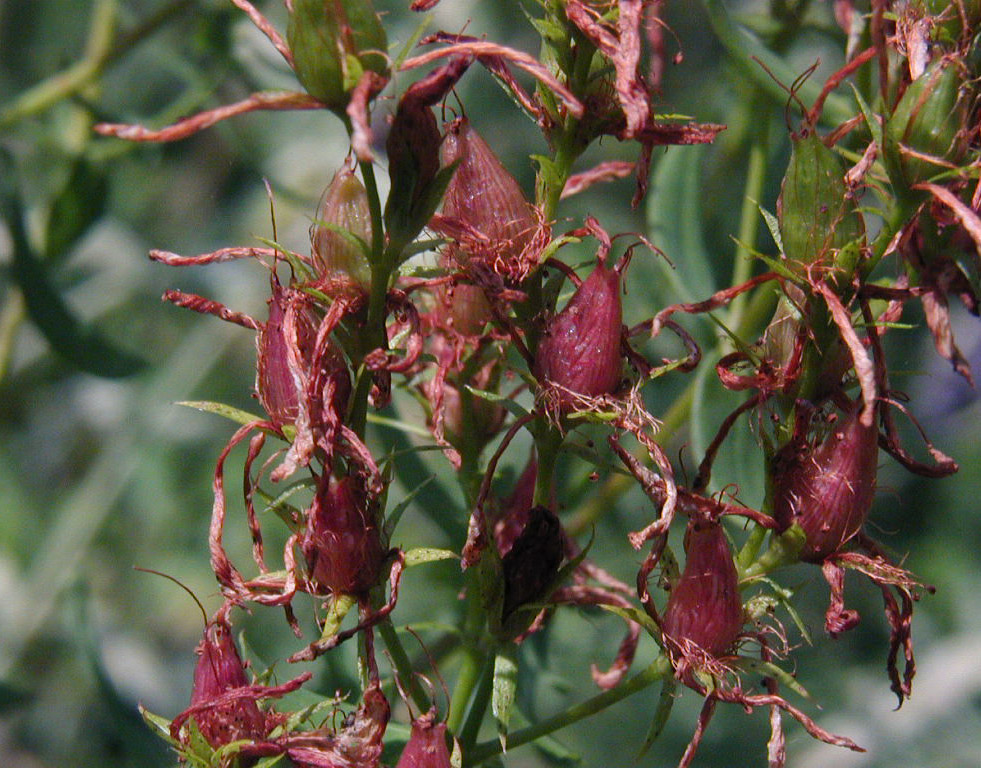
Fruit

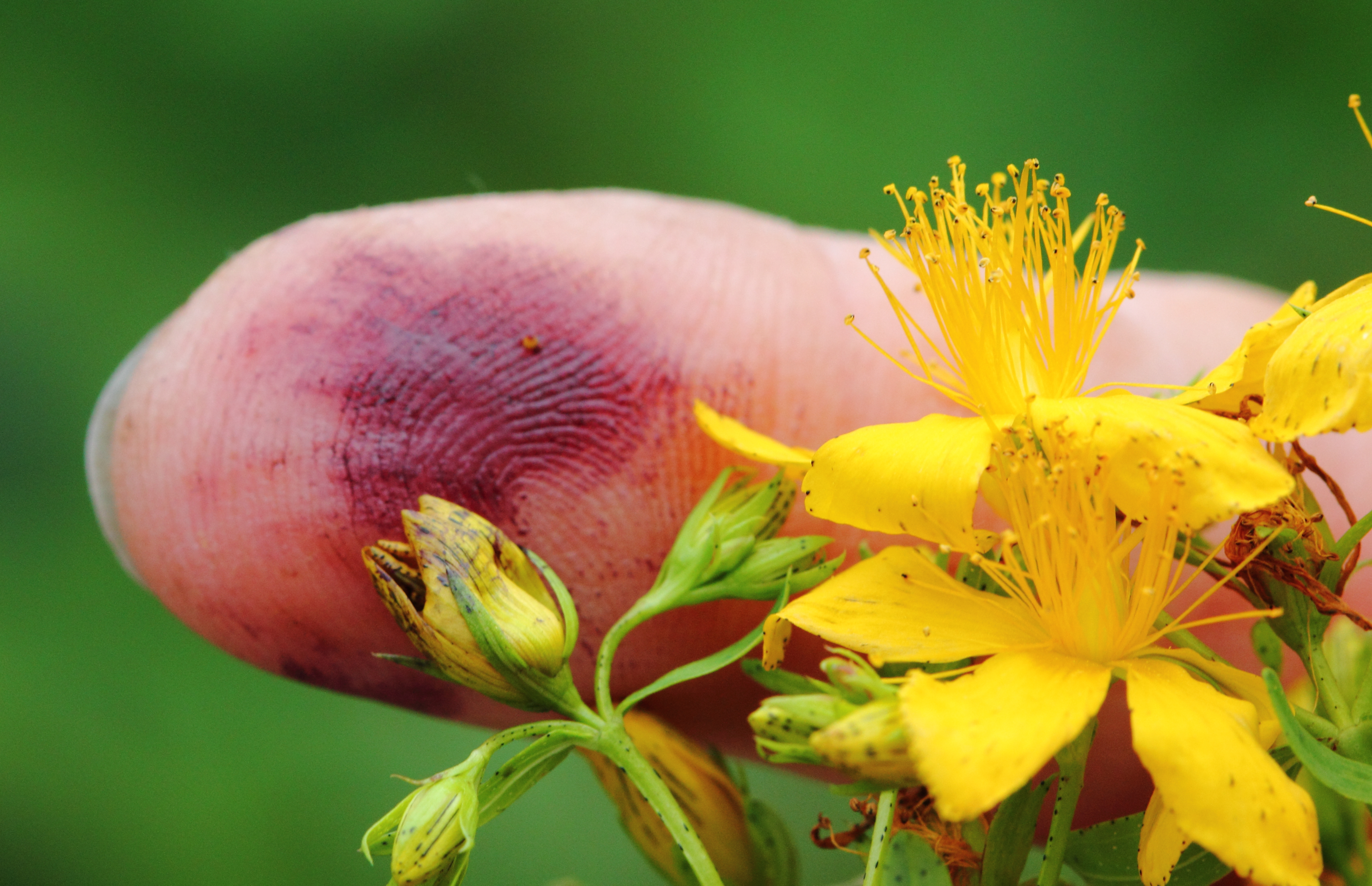
Red staining liquid from a flower bud

=== Similar species ===
Hypericum maculatum is visually similar to Hypericum perforatum; however, its stems have four ridges instead of two and are also hollow. In addition, its leaves have fewer translucent glands and more dark glands. H. maculatum is native to the Old World but has also been introduced to North America.

In North America several native species may be confused with Hypericum perforatum. Hypericum anagalloides is a low-growing creeping plant with rounder leaves and fewer stamens. Hypericum boreale is a smaller plant with more delicate flowers. Hypericum canadense has smaller flowers with sepals that show between the petals. Hypericum concinnum has flowers with petals that bend backward at the tip and also has much narrower, gray-green leaves. Growing in riparian areas along rivers, Hypericum ellipticum has wider leaves with a more elliptic shape. Hypericum scouleri has leaves that are broader at the base and also thicker. All except for H. concinnum grow in environments that are generally more moist than where H. perforatum is found.

=== Phytochemistry ===
Chemical structure of hypericin

The most common active chemicals in Hypericum perforatum are hypericin and pseudohypericin (naphthodianthrones), and hyperforin (a phloroglucinol derivative). The species contains a host of essential oils, the bulk of which are sesquiterpenes. In the wild, the concentrations of any active chemicals can vary widely among individual plants and populations.

Compound	Conc.	log P	PSA	pK_{a}	Formula	MW	CYP1A2 (Note: In brackets is the IC_{50}/EC_{50} value depending on whether it is an inhibitory or inductive action being exhibited, respectively.)	CYP2C9 (Note: As with last note)	CYP2D6	CYP3A4	PGP	t_{1/2} (h)	T_{max} (h)	C_{max} (mM)	C_{SS} (mM)	Notes/Biological activity (Note: Values given in brackets are IC_{50}/EC_{50} depending on whether it is an inhibitory or inductive action the compound displays towards the biologic target in question. If it pertains to bacterial growth inhibition the value is MIC_{50})
Phloroglucinols (2–5%)
Adhyperforin	0.2–1.9	10–13	71.4	8.51	C_{36}H_{54}O_{4}	550.81	?	?	?	?	?	?	?	?	?	?
Hyperforin	2–4.5	9.7–13	71.4	8.51	C_{35}H_{52}O_{4}	536.78	+	±	–	+	+	3.5–16	2.5–4.4	15-235	53.7	–
Naphthodianthrones (0.03-3%)
Hypericin	0.003-3	7.5–10	156	6.9±0.2	C_{30}H_{16}O_{8}	504.44	0	– (3.4 μM)	– (8.5 μM)	– (8.7 μM)	?	2.5–6.5	6–48	0.66-46	?	?
Pseudohypericin	0.2–0.23	6.7±1.8	176	7.16	C_{30}H_{16}O_{9}	520.44	?	?	?	?	?	24.8–25.4	3	1.4–16	0.6–10.8	–
Flavonoids (2–12%)
Amentoflavone	0.01–0.05	3.1–5.1	174	2.39	C_{30}H_{18}O_{10}	538.46	?	– (35 nM)	– (24.3 μM)	– (4.8 μM)	?	?	?	?	?	?
Apigenin	0.1–0.5	2.1±0.56	87	6.63	C_{15}H_{10}O_{5}	270.24	?	?	?	?	?	?	?	?	?	?
Catechin	2–4	1.8±0.85	110	8.92	C_{15}H_{14}O_{6}	290.27	?	?	?	?	?	?	?	?	?	?
Epigallocatechin	?	−0.5–1.5	131	8.67	C_{15}H_{14}O_{6}	290.27	?	?	?	?	?	1.7±0.4^{a}	1.3–1.6^{a}	?	?	?
Hyperoside	0.5-2	1.5±1.7	174	6.17	C_{21}H_{20}O_{12}	464.38	?	?	?	?	?	?	?	?	?	
Kaempferol	?	2.1±0.6	107	6.44	C_{15}H_{10}O_{6}	286.24	?	?	?	±	?	?	?	?	?	?
Luteolin	?	2.4±0.65	107	6.3	C_{15}H_{10}O_{6}	286.24	–	?	?	?	?	?	?	?	?	?
Quercetin	2–4	2.2±1.5	127	6.44	C_{15}H_{10}O_{7}	302.24	– (7.5 μM)^{b}	– (47 μM)^{b}	– (24 μM)^{b}	– (22 μM)^{b}	–	20–72^{c}	8^{c}	?	?	?
Rutin	0.3–1.6	1.2±2.1	266	6.43	C_{27}H_{30}O_{16}	610.52	?	?	?	?	?	?	?	?	?	?
Phenolic acids (~0.1%)
Caffeic acid	0.1	1.4±0.4	77.8	3.64	C_{9}H_{8}O_{4}	180.16	?	?	?	–	?	?	?	?	?	?
Chlorogenic acid	<0.1%	-0.36±0.43	165	3.33	C_{16}H_{18}O_{9}	354.31	0	0	0	0	?	?	?	?	?	?

Acronyms and symbols
Acronym/Symbol	Meaning
MW	Molecular weight in g•mol^{−1}.
PGP	P-glycoprotein
t_{1/2}	Elimination half-life in hours
T_{max}	Time to peak plasma concentration in hours
C_{max}	Peak plasma concentration in mM
C_{SS}	Steady state plasma concentration in mM
$\log{P}$	Partition coefficient.
PSA	Polar surface area of the molecule in question in square angstroms (Å^{2}). Obtained from PubChem
Conc.	These values pertain to the approximation concentration (in %) of the constituents in the fresh plant material
–	Indicates inhibition of the enzyme in question.
+	Indicates an inductive effect on the enzyme in question.
0	No effect on the enzyme in question.
5-HT	5-hydroxytryptamine – synonym for serotonin.
DA	Dopamine
NE	Norepinephrine
GABA	γ-aminobutyric acid
Glu	Glutamate
Gly	Glycine
Ch	Choline
^{a}	?
^{b}	?
^{c}	?

== Taxonomy ==
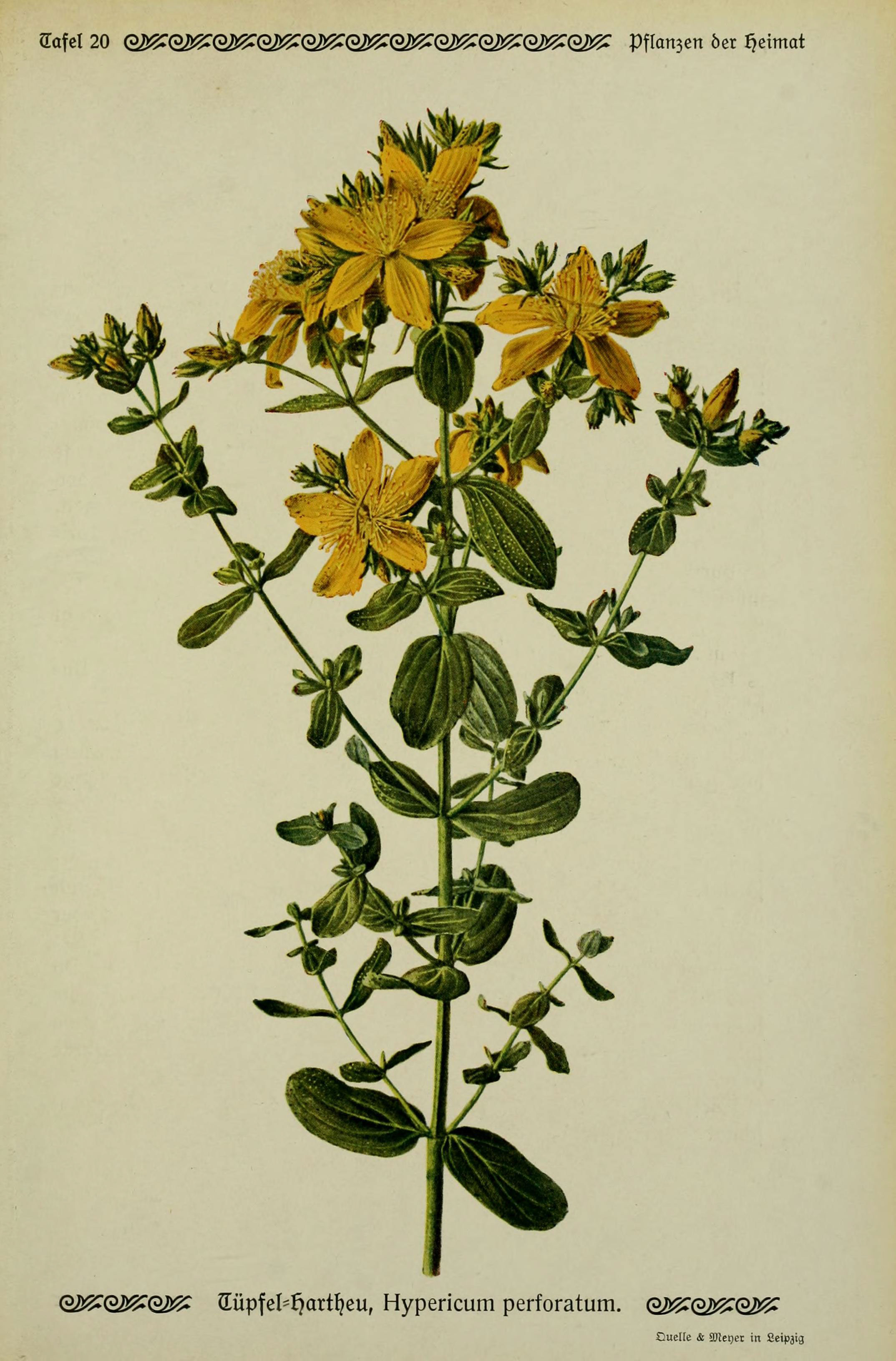
1913 botanical illustration of H. perforatum by Jost Fitschen in Pflanzen der Heimat

Hypericum perforatum was selected to be the type species around which the genus Hypericum is based because of its wide cosmopolitan distribution; it is the most common species of the genus in many of the areas it is found, and is one of the most widely known plants among the St John's worts in folklore and medicine. The current accepted placement of H. perforatum within its genus can be summarized as follows:

Hypericum

Hypericum subg. Hypericum

Hypericum sect. Hypericum

Hypericum subsect. Hypericum

Hypericum ser. Senanensia
Hypericum ser. Hypericum

H. attenuatum
H. iwate-littorale
H. maculatum
H. momoseanum
H. perforatum
H. scouleri
H. tetrapterum
H. tosaense
H. triquetrifolium
H. undulatum

=== Phylogeny ===
Hypericum perforatum has a chromosome count of 2n = 32. The likely reason for this is that the species is a hybrid between the very closely related H. maculatum subsp. immaculatum and H. attenuatum, which means it inherited sets of chromosomes from both parents and is allopolyploid. The two species almost certainly hybridized within Siberia, Russia. The equation for this hybridization is:

H. maculatum subsp. immaculatum (16) × H. attenuatum (16)×2 = H. perforatum (32)

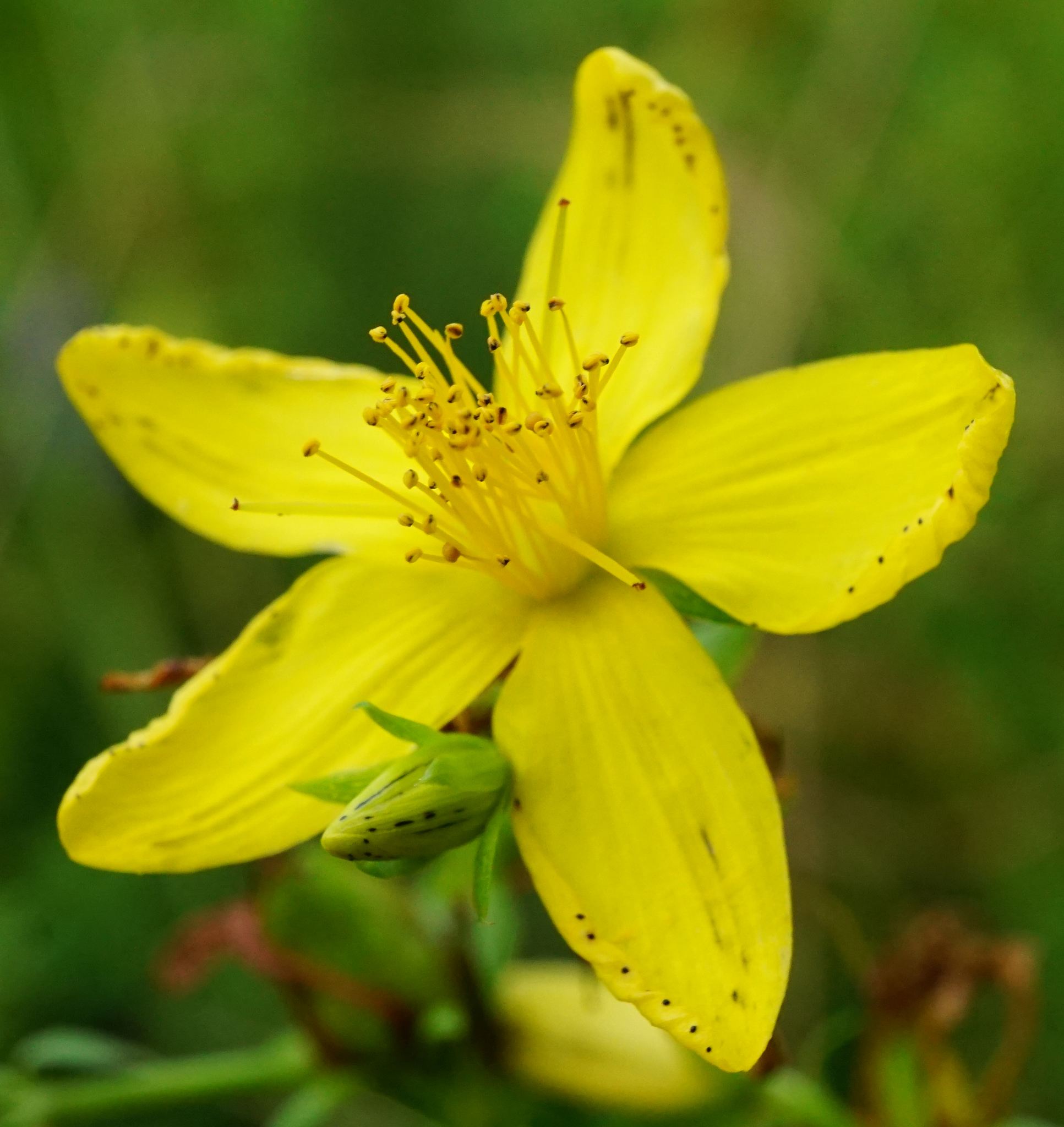
Hypericum × desetangsii is a hybrid between H. perforatum and H. maculatum. It displays intermediate traits of the two species.

Because of its hybrid origins, Hypericum perforatum is one of the few species within its genus that is able to further hybridize with other species, specifically those within H. ser. Hypericum. The hybrids that are descended from H. perforatum can be triploid (3 sets of chromosomes) to hexaploid (6 sets), depending on the chromosome count of the second parent species and the ploidy of the specific H. perforatum gamete that is fertilized or is fertilizing. The triploid offspring exhibit and a mix of traits from the two parents and pass them on to their offspring; the tetraploids also have a mix of traits, but often do not pass on the traits of both parents; the pentaploids are rarely distinguishable from H. perforatum. Because of this, after many generations of hybridization a wide range of traits on a spectrum between the two hybridizing species can be observed in the wild.

Hybrids involving H. perforatum
Crossed with	Hybrid name	Chromosome number (Note: Uncertainty in chromosome number notated by "?")
H. elegans	H. perforatum × elegans	2n = 32?
H. tetrapterum	H. × medium	2n = 24?
H. maculatum ssp. maculatum	H. × desetangsii nssp. carinthiacum	2n = 24/40
H. maculatum ssp. immaculatum	H. × desetangsii nssp. balcanicum	2n = 24/40?
H. maculatum ssp. obtusiusculum	H. × desetangsii nssp. desetangsii	2n = 40

=== Etymology and common names ===
The genus name Hypericum is possibly derived from the Greek words hyper (above) and eikon (picture), in reference to the tradition of hanging the plant over religious icons in the home. The specific epithet perforatum is Latin and refers to the perforated appearance of the plant's leaves.

The common name St John's wort comes from the fact that its flowers and buds were commonly harvested at the time of the Midsummer festival, which was later Christianized as St John's Feast Day on 24 June. It was believed that harvesting the flower at this time made its healing and magical powers more potent. The herb would be hung on house and stall doors on St John's Feast Day to ward off evil spirits and to safeguard against harm and sickness to people and livestock. In other traditions it was burned in bonfires for the protection of crops along with other herbs believed to be magical. Because of its supposed potency in warding off spirits, the plant was also known as fuga daemonum (loosely "demon-flight"). Many other similarly fanciful names have been used for it including devil's scourge, Lord God's wonder plant, and witch's herb. In medieval Kent it was called herbe Ion (Ion in this case referring to "John") as recorded in the poem The Feate of Gardening. Other local names for Hypericum perforatum include balm of the warrior's wound in Somerset, penny John in Norfolk, rosin rose in Yorkshire, and touch-and-heal in Northern Ireland. Locally in the United States, it may also be referred to as Tipton-weed, goatweed, or Klamath weed.

In the 21st century, any species of the genus Hypericum can be referred to as St John's wort. Therefore, it is more accurate to call Hypericum perforatum the common St John's wort or perforate St John's wort.

=== History ===
Hypericum perforatum has been known and used since at least the first century. Pedanius Dioscorides, an early pharmacologist, referred to either it or H. empetrifolium as akuron. The species was first formally described by Carl Linnaeus in the second tome of Species Plantarum in 1753. In it, he gave the following brief description that would serve as the foundation for all subsequent identification of the species:

HYPERICUM floribus trigynis, caule ancipiti, foliis obtusis pellucido-punctatis.
Hypericum with flowers that have three pistils, ancipital stems, and obtuse leaves with pointed dots.

Linnaeus also noted the species' habitat in the "meadows of Europe" and gave a short account of previous mentions of the plant. While Linnaeus' taxonomic priority for this species is not in question, there are a number of botanical synonyms that were published in the early years of formal botanical nomenclature. Gaterau published Description des plantes qui croissent aux environs de Montauban in 1789 which described and called the species Hypericum officinale, a name now considered to be illegitimate under the principle of priority. Likewise, the name Hypericum officinarum by the botanist Heinrich Johann Nepomuk von Crantz in 1763 also postdated Linnaeus' 1753 naming and description and is considered invalid.

=== Subdivision ===
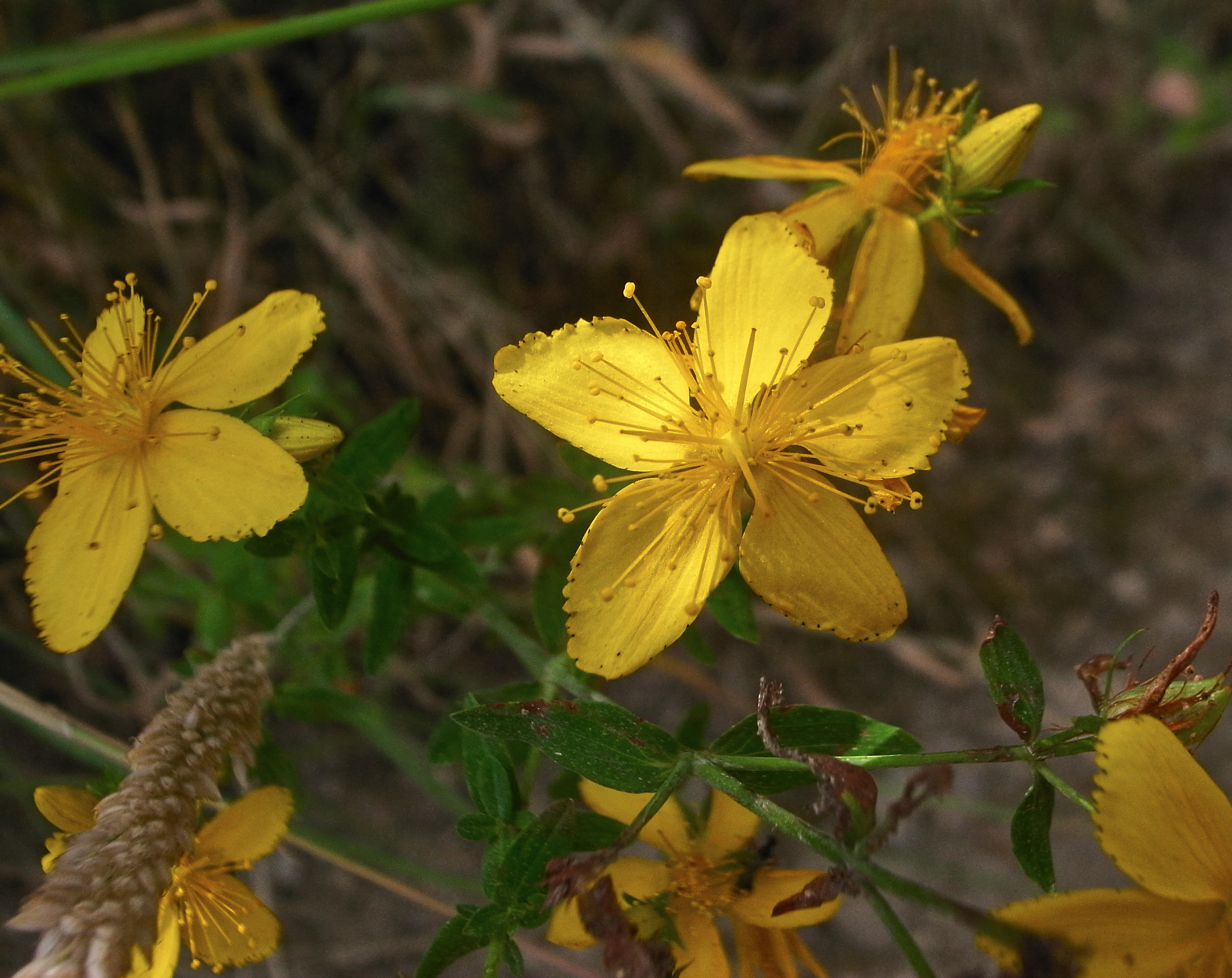
H. perforatum ssp. veronense

Hypericum perforatum exhibits a great deal of variability in its appearance across its distribution. Thus, determining the exact nature of its infraspecific taxa is difficult because of the many intermediate forms that exist.

- H. perforatum subspecies perforatum Stjep.-Vesel. is the type form of the species. It is distributed from the origin of the species in Siberia, west to central Europe, and east to northern Mongolia. The base changes as the plant grows from round to a broad wedge shape, and the seed capsule vittae are present throughout the plant's life cycle and are almost always narrow.
  - H. perforatum variety angustifolium DC. is a variety of the species that is found in drier climates within the range of ssp. perforatum. It has leaves that look more like those of ssp. veronense, but they have leaf stalks; the glands on the seed capsule are also distinct.
  - H. perforatum var. humile Stranski can be found in parts of the southern Balkans. These plants possess smaller, more ring-shaped leaves and the seed capsules have flattish vesicles on their surface. These appear to be adaptations of ssp. perforatum in response to the mountainous habitats of the region.
- H. perforatum ssp. songaricum is likely the most primitive after ssp. perforatum. Previously described as a variety by Karl Koch, Norman Robson elevated the taxon to subspecies in his monograph of the genus. The leaves are sessile and have a heart-shaped base that partially surrounds the stem.
  - H. perforatum var. gracile has smaller leaves and is found in western Kazakhstan, southern Russia, and southern Ukraine. In the drier areas of this range the variety exhibits a dull grey-green color on the underside of its leaves.
- H. perforatum ssp. veronense can be found in the Caucasus, across the Middle East to Tajikistan, and along North Africa to Macaronesia. These plants have narrower leaves and display diagonal vittae on the seed capsules. Where it meets the distribution of ssp. perforatum the two subspecies hybridize regularly.
  - H. perforatum var. ellipticum retains the diagonal vittae of the subspecies but the leaves are not as narrow. The variety is distributed in areas with greater moisture such as in the mountainous areas of Turkmenistan.
- H. perforatum ssp. chinense is found across most of China and was introduced into Japan (under the synonym H foliosissimum Koidz.). Both its leaves and flowers are smaller, and the flower clusters are smaller and more crowded on the ends of longer branches.

== Distribution and habitat ==
=== Distribution ===
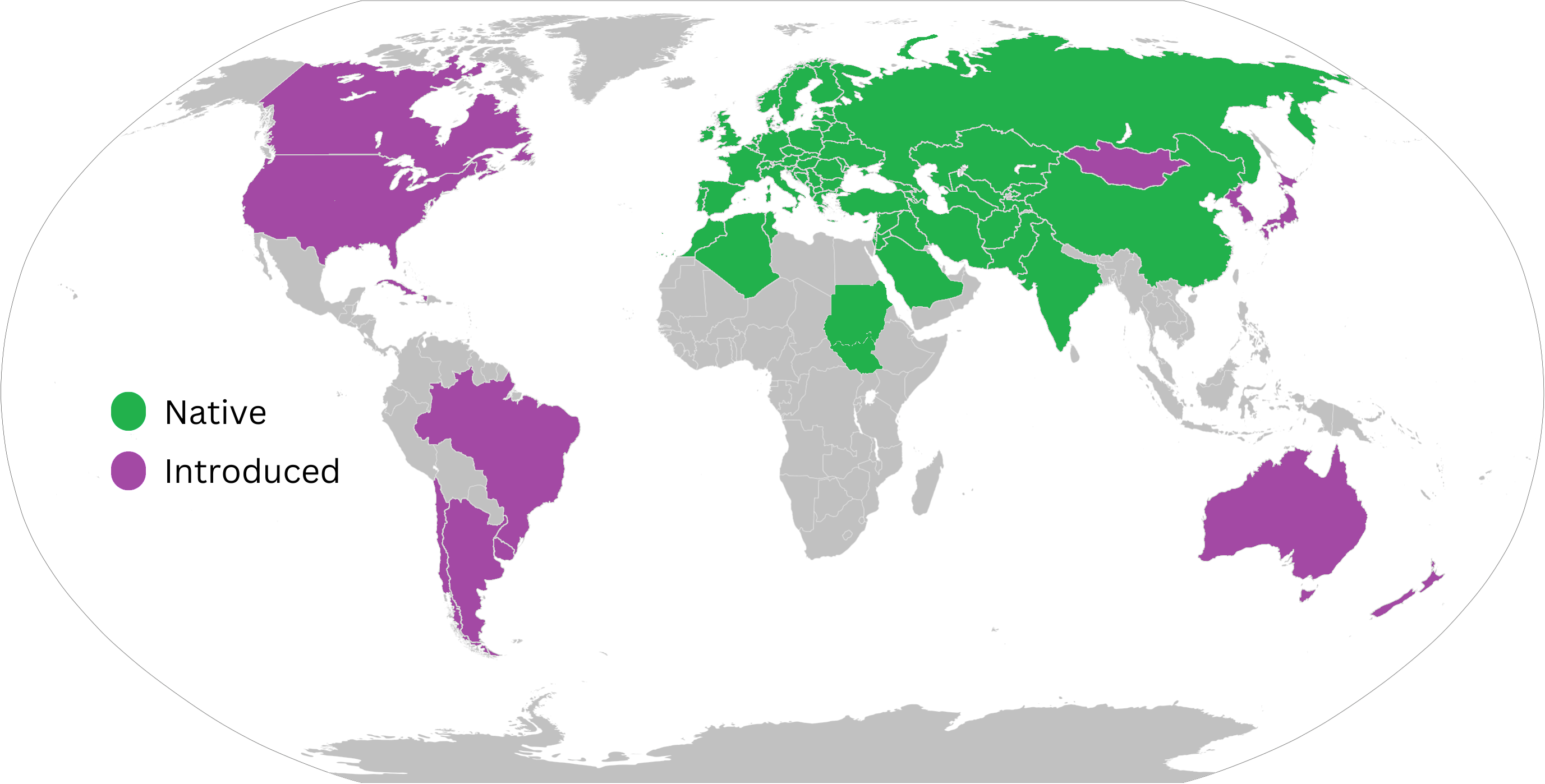
Country-level distribution of Hypericum perforatum, based on data from the Royal Botanic Gardens, Kew

Hypericum perforatum is thought to be native to every nation in Europe, and is only absent from the far north such as north European Russia and Svalbard. It grows in parts of North Africa and is native to Morocco, Algeria, Tunisia, and Sudan.

In the Arabian Peninsula it only grows in parts of Saudi Arabia. It is present and native to all of the Western Asia phytogeographic region from the Aegean Islands and Turkey to Israel and Palestine in the west to Afghanistan in the east, only being absent from the Sinai Peninsula. Just to the east of this area it is also native to Pakistan and the western Himalaya region of India.

In the temperate parts of Asia, Hypericum perforatum is mostly absent from Siberia with the exception of Western Siberia, the Altai Region, and the warmest parts of Krasnoyarsk Krai. It has also been introduced to Irkutsk and Buryatia. It is a native part of the flora of Central Asia, growing in all the former Soviet republics. It also is known in almost every part of the Caucasus. In China it is native to Xinjiang (in western China), central China, and southern China, but not to Inner Mongolia, Manchuria, or Tibet. In the far east of Asia it has been introduced to Primorye in Russia, Korea, and Japan.

In North America, it is found in all of the continental US states except for Utah, Arizona, Florida, and Alabama. It has been introduced throughout much of Canada, as well as in Hawaii, Cuba, and Haiti.

In South America, it is found in Argentina, Chile, Uruguay, the Juan Fernández Islands, and the more temperate parts of Brazil in the southeast. In the southern parts of Africa it has become established in South Africa, Lesotho, and Réunion.

In Australia the plant is found in the states of South Australia, Tasmania, Victoria, New South Wales, and Western Australia; in all these states it has been listed as a declared weed, since it renders agricultural land unproductive for grazing. It has been introduced to both the North and South Islands of New Zealand.

=== Habitat ===
The species can be found in a variety of habitats including open woods, meadows, grasslands, steppe, riverbanks, and stony or grassy hillsides and roadsides. It prefers dry habitats or areas with strong drainage. The species thrives in areas with at least 760 mm (30 in) of rainfall per year; however, its distribution is restricted by temperatures too low for seed germination or seedling survival: an absolute minimum of −3 °C or an annual average of 9 °C. Altitudes greater than 1,500 m (4,900 ft), rainfall less than 500 mm (20 in), and daily mean temperatures greater than 24 °C (75 °F) are also considered limiting thresholds.

== Ecology ==
=== Reproduction ===
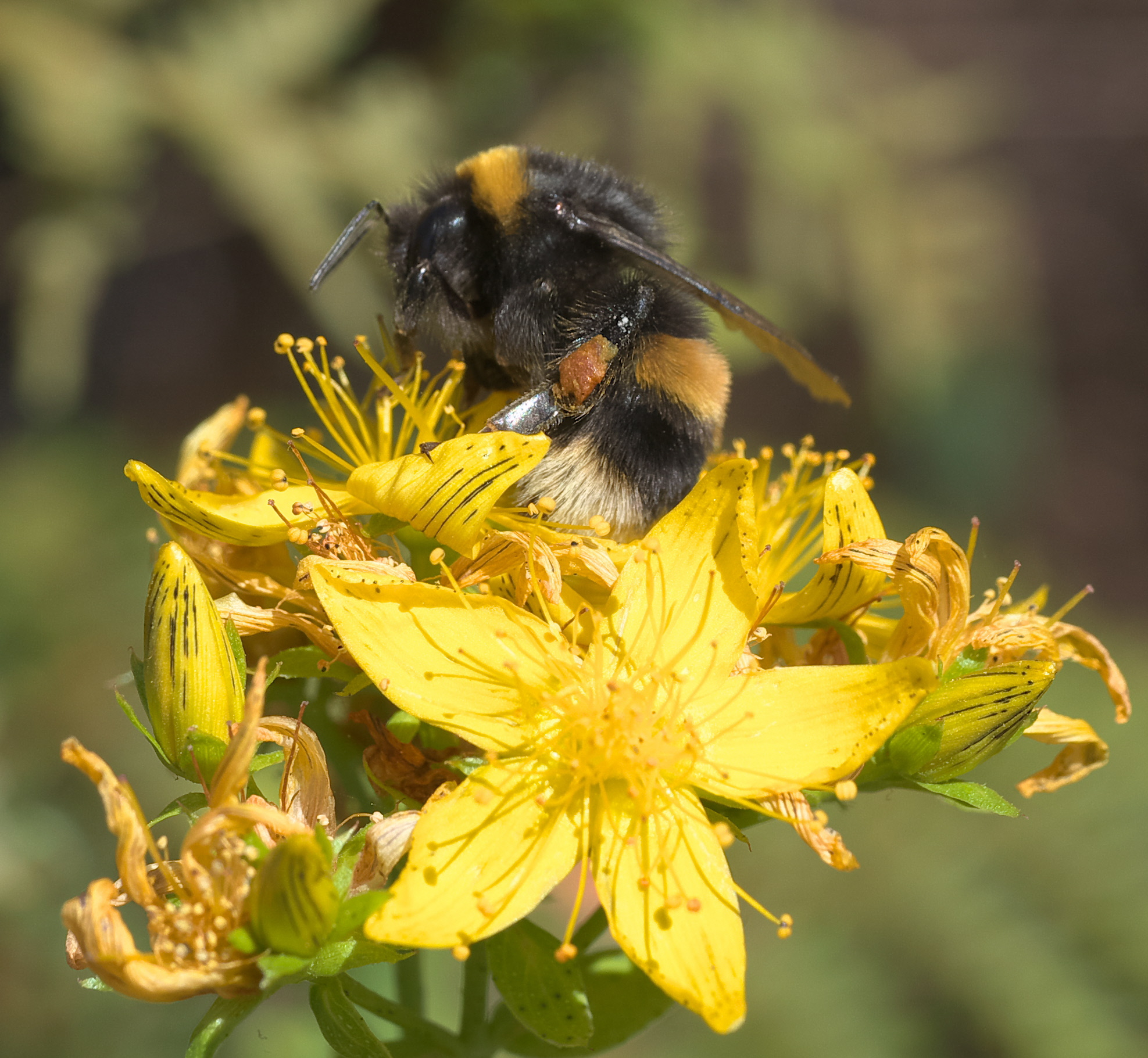
Bombus terrestris pollinating the flowers of Hypericum perforatum

St John's wort reproduces both vegetatively and sexually. Depending on environmental and climatic conditions, and the age of the plant, St John's wort will alter the way it grows to promote survival. Summer rains are particularly effective in allowing the plant to grow vegetatively, following defoliation by insects or grazing. St John's wort may also produce viable seeds without fertilization. Its seeds can persist for decades while lying dormant underground in an ecosystem's soil seed bank, germinating after they are disturbed.

=== Diseases ===
H. perforatum is affected by phytoplasma diseases, and when infected with Candidatus phytoplasma fraxini it shows visible symptoms, including yellowing and deformities called witch's broom. Its chemical profile is also altered: naphthodianthrone, flavonoid, amentoflavone, and pseudohypericin levels are reduced; chlorogenic acid levels are increased. Additionally, phytoplasma diseases greatly reduce the essential oil yield of the plant.

Dieback among populations of St John's wort is also caused by fungal anthracnose, such as Colletotrichum gloeosporioides. This fungus causes the stems to lose their bark (girdling) and turn brown, and dries the aboveground parts of the plant. The infection often kills the plant within the first year of its growth, or reduces productivity over a three-year deterioration.

=== Role as a herbivore food source ===
Though Hypericum perforatum is generally avoided by mammalian herbivores, a number of insects are dependent on it and its close relatives as a food source. Chrysolina quadrigemina and C. hyperici are two beetle species that feed on plants from the genus Hypericum, including H. perforatum. Chrysolina quadrigemina can be colored metallic blue, purple, green, or bronze and is better adapted to warm and dry climates; Chrysolina hyperici is consistently smaller, metallic green, and tends to live in areas with wetter and cooler conditions. Another Hyericum specialist beetle is Agrilus hyperici, the St John's wort root borer, whose larvae feed on the roots of H. perforatum while the adults feed on the foliage.

A moth, Aplocera plagiata, feeds heavily upon the leaves of H. perforatum as a caterpillar and is commonly known as the common St John's wort inchworm. As adults, they are a small moth with gray wings and dark gray bands. Another moth that feeds upon H. perforatum is Euspilapteryx auroguttella. Their caterpillars start by mining the inside of the leaves and later roll the leaves into cigar shapes to feed in greater safety. Agonopterix hypericella is another small (17 mm (0.67 in)) gray moth that exclusively feeds upon Hypericum.

Zeuxidiplosis giardi, the common St. Johnswort gall midge, is a small (3 mm (0.12 in)) fly that eats H. perforatum while developing. The larvae feed upon leaf buds, which causes the plant to form a round growth called a gall where the developing insect can feed, is protected, and pupates into a mature adult.

=== Toxicity ===
Hypericum perforatum is toxic to numerous domestic animals such as cows, sheep, and horses. When these animals come into contact with the plant, usually through grazing, they develop serious symptoms. The first signs are reddening of the skin accompanied by swelling, which is followed by necrosis and sloughing of the skin. Non-pigmented, white skin is most affected by the poisoning, such as the nose and ears of certain breeds of sheep. Young animals are more susceptible to H. perforatum poisoning, and the plant is most toxic in spring (when it is the most palatable to herbivores) and retains its toxic effects when dried in hay. Additionally, affected animals will become highly photosensitive, and exposure to sunlight can exacerbate their symptoms. As such, they should be moved to a dark area; administering of antihistamines or anti-inflammatory medicines may also help alleviate the symptoms.

=== Invasiveness ===
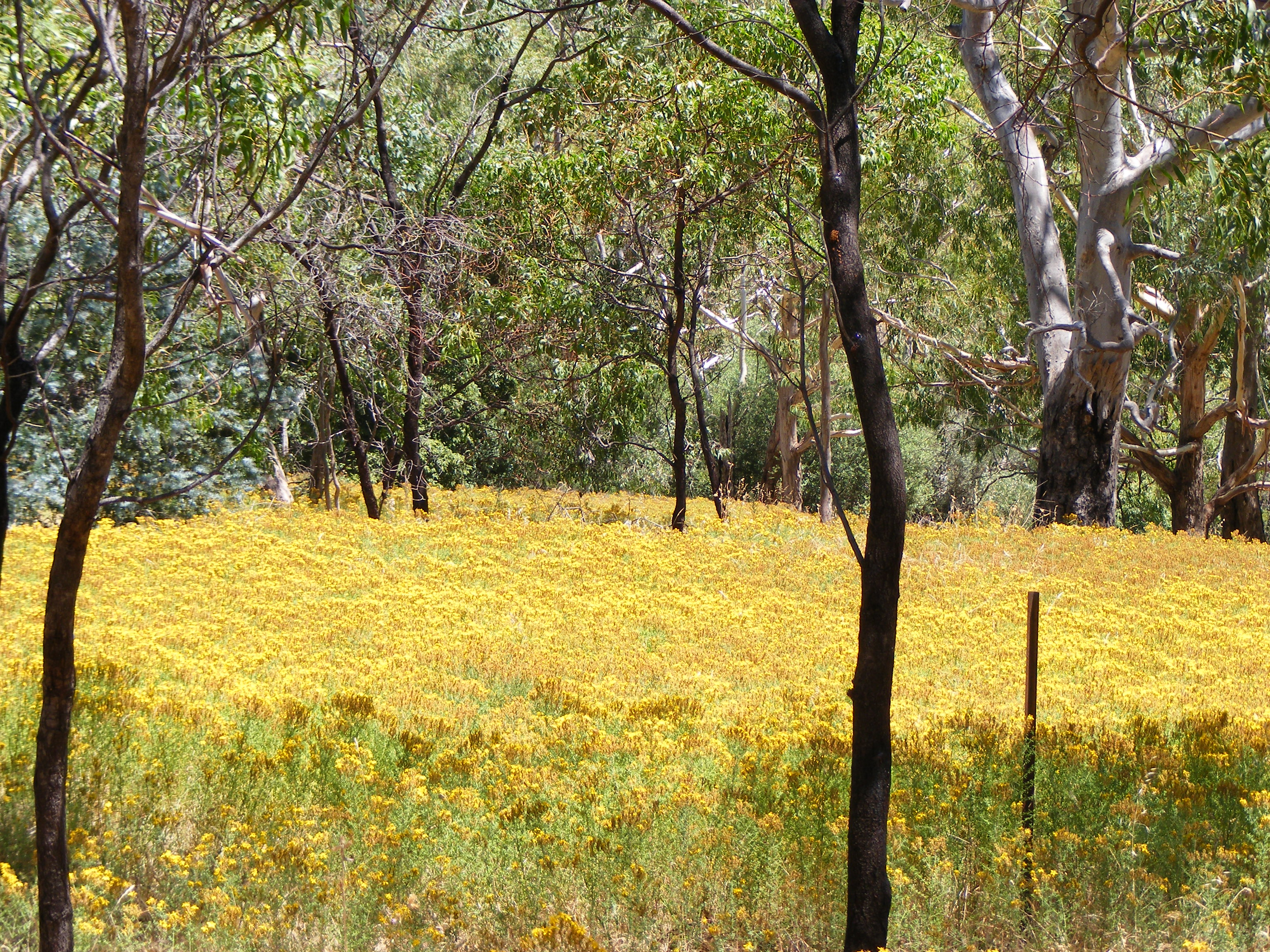
Hypericum perforatum growing prolifically in Belair National Park, South Australia

Although H. perforatum is grown commercially in some regions of southeast Europe, it is listed as a noxious weed in more than 20 countries and has introduced populations in South and North America, India, New Zealand, Australia, and South Africa. In pastures, St John's wort acts as both a toxic and invasive weed. It replaces native plant communities and forage vegetation to the extent of making productive land nonviable or becoming an invasive species in natural habitats and ecosystems.

Effective herbicides for control of Hypericum perforatum include 2,4-D, picloram, metsulfuron, and glyphosate. Insect herbivores have also been introduced as biocontrol agents in areas outside their native range. Some of the most widely used are Chrysolina quadrigemina, Chrysolina hyperici, Agrilus hyperici, Aplocera plagiata, and Zeuxidiplosis giardi.

== Uses ==
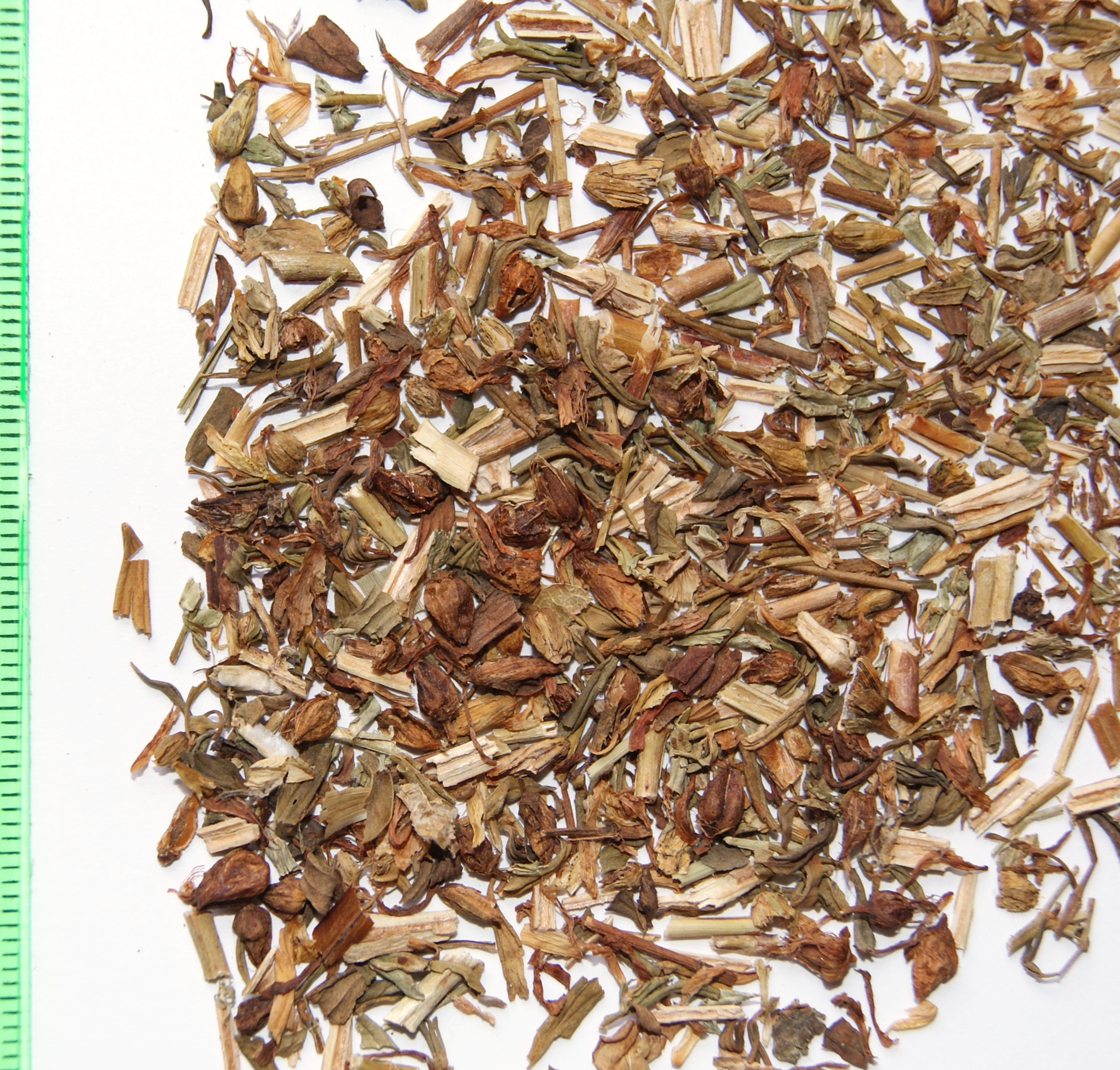
Dried Hypericum perforatum for use as the herbal drug herba hyperici

=== Antidepressant effects ===
H. perforatum has approval in the European Union as a herbal product for the treatment of mild to moderate depressive episodes (according to ICD-10) and for the short-term treatment of symptoms in mild depression. It is more effective than placebo and as effective as standard antidepressants, including SSRIs, for mild to moderate depression, with some evidence suggesting fewer adverse effects and lower discontinuation rates. In America, H. perforatum is not approved as a treatment for depression, and its use in treating depression is discouraged by NIH and Cleveland Clinic. H. perforatum can cause serious side effects such as serotonin syndrome if taken with other antidepressants.

In vitro, it acts mainly as a reuptake inhibitor of serotonin, dopamine, and norepinephrine; additional antidepressant effects may come from its interactions with GABA receptors.

=== In traditional medicine ===
Common St. John's wort has been used in herbalism for centuries. It was used in classical antiquity and was a standard component of ancient concoctions called theriacs, from the Mithridate of Aulus Cornelius Celsus' De Medicina (c. 30 CE) to the Venice treacle of d'Amsterdammer Apotheek in 1686. One folk use included the oily extract known as St John's oil, a red, oily liquid extracted from H. perforatum that may help heal wounds. The dried flower is crushed to make the compound known as herba hyperici.

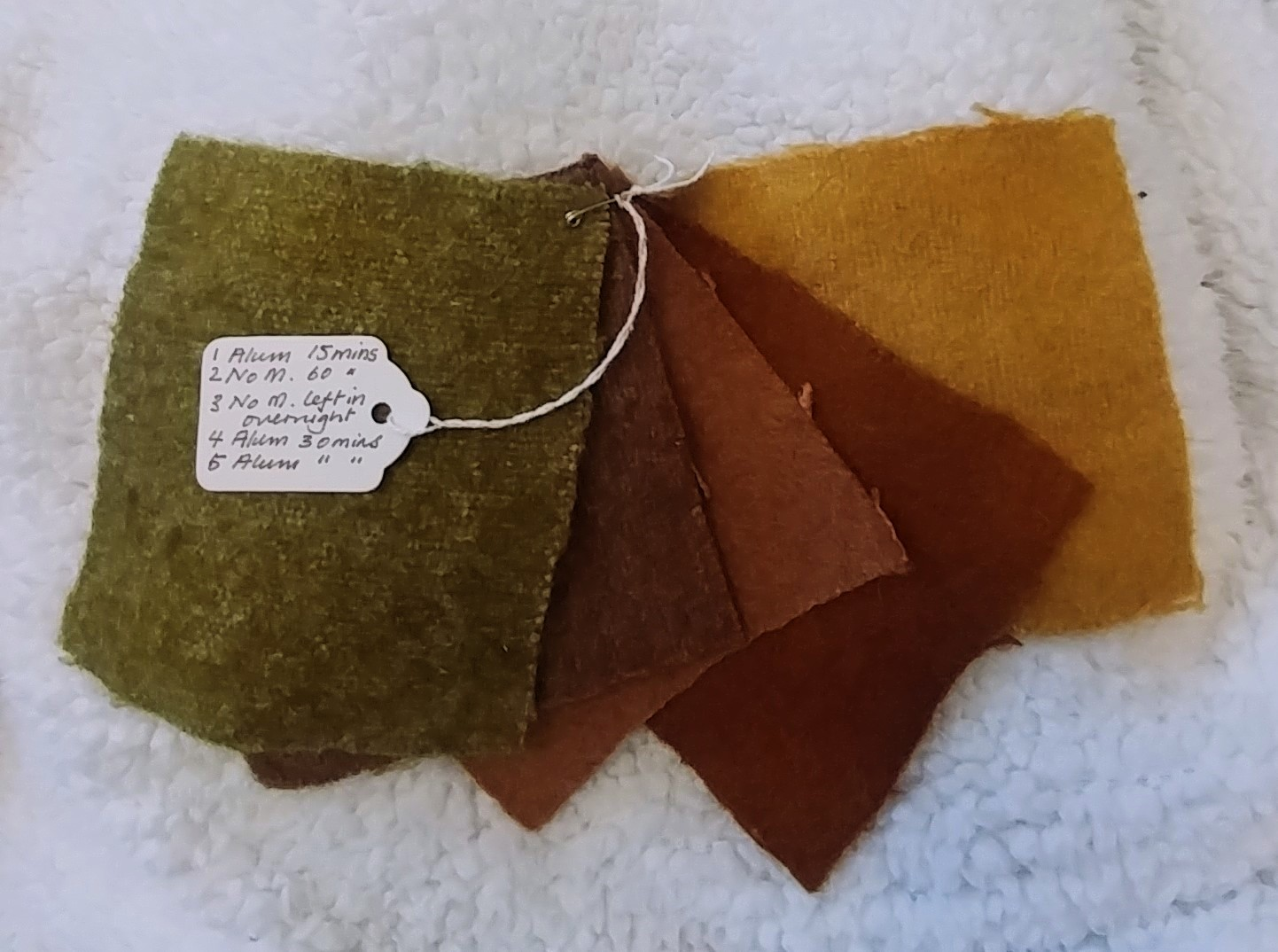
Samples of wool dyed using H. perforatum

=== As a dyeing pigment ===
H. perforatum generally produces a variety of yellows suitable for dyeing. When the pigments are extracted using ethanol, a violet-red colour is made which can be used to dye silk and wool when rinsed in vinegar. The colours produced are season-dependent.

The flowers produce a series of four different shades on wool, if used in the correct sequence. Wool mordanted with alum and unmordanted wool is used. The flowers are simmered to produce a deep red liquid dye. The alum-mordanted wool skein is added and simmered until green is made. If unmordanted wool is added to the same dye, it will turn reddish-maroon. The final colour produced is by continuing the method, to produce yellow or gold.

== Inability to treat cancer ==
There is no clinical evidence that St John's wort is effective to treat cancer. The National Cancer Institute has commented that "the FDA has not approved the use of St. John's wort as a treatment for cancer or any other medical condition". St John's wort may reduce the efficacy of chemotherapy.

== Interactions with drugs ==
Use of H. perforatum may cause significant drug interactions, primarily through PXR activation and CYP3A4 induction linked to its hyperforin content, affecting the efficacy and safety of various medications.

St. John's wort can interfere with the effects of prescription and over-the-counter drugs in potentially adverse ways by increasing CYP3A4 and CYP2C9 liver enzymes, leading to faster conversion of drugs. Specific consequences may include reduced effectiveness of oral contraceptives, heart medications, HIV drugs, cancer medications, and some anticoagulants; other adverse effects may involve breakthrough bleeding when taking oral contraceptives, and decreased effectiveness of immunosuppressants in people with organ transplants.

The increase in these enzymes have been found to be caused by high hyperforin content; consumption of St John's wort products with minimal hyperforin causes fewer side effects and less interference. However, the concentration of St John's wort's constituent chemicals (including hyperforin) can vary widely between different products, and their dosage may not be properly marked on packaging.

== Adverse effects ==
Use of H. perforatum may produce adverse effects when combined with other antidepressants through an increase in brain serotonin levels called serotonin syndrome, which may be life-threatening and is associated with rapid heart rate, acute hypertension, mydriasis, and fever. Photosensitivity and acute neuropathy upon sun exposure, and reduced response to chemotherapy are other possible effects.

Common side effects of St John's wort products are headache, nausea, fatigue, dry mouth, sleepiness, and gastrointestinal upset. It should not be consumed during pregnancy and breastfeeding.

== Regulation ==
In the United States, St. John's wort is considered a dietary supplement by the FDA, is not regulated by the same standards as a prescription drug, and does not have clearly defined mechanisms in people.
