= Adverse effect =

Harmful effect resulting from a medication or other medical intervention

- Specialty: Pharmacology

An adverse effect is an undesired harmful effect resulting from a medication or other intervention, such as surgery. An adverse effect may be termed a "side effect", when judged to be secondary to a main or therapeutic effect. The term complication is similar to adverse effect, but the latter is typically used in pharmacological contexts, or when the negative effect is expected or common. If the negative effect results from an unsuitable or incorrect dosage or procedure, this is called a medical error and not an adverse effect. Adverse effects are sometimes referred to as "iatrogenic" because they are generated by a physician/treatment. Some adverse effects occur only when starting, increasing or discontinuing a treatment. Using a drug or other medical intervention which is contraindicated may increase the risk of adverse effects. Adverse effects may cause complications of a disease or procedure and negatively affect its prognosis. They may also lead to non-compliance with a treatment regimen. Adverse effects of medical treatment resulted in 142,000 deaths in 2013 up from 94,000 deaths in 1990 globally.

The harmful outcome is usually indicated by some result such as morbidity, mortality, alteration in body weight, levels of enzymes, loss of function, or as a pathological change detected at the microscopic, macroscopic or physiological level. It may also be indicated by symptoms reported by a patient. Adverse effects may cause a reversible or irreversible change, including an increase or decrease in the susceptibility of the individual to other chemicals, foods, or procedures, such as drug interactions.

== Classification ==
In terms of drugs, adverse events may be defined as: "Any untoward medical occurrence in a patient or clinical investigation subject administered a pharmaceutical product and which does not necessarily have to have a causal relationship with this treatment."

In clinical trials, a distinction is made between an adverse event and a serious adverse event. Generally, any event which causes death, permanent damage, birth defects, or requires hospitalization is considered a serious adverse event. The results of trials are often included in the labelling of the medication to provide information both for patients and the prescribing physicians.

The term "life-threatening" in the context of a serious adverse event refers to an event in which the patient was at risk of death at the time of the event; it does not refer to an event which hypothetically might have caused death if it were more severe.

== Reporting systems ==
In many countries, adverse effects are required by law to be reported, researched in clinical trials and included into the patient information accompanying medical devices and drugs for sale to the public. Investigators in human clinical trials are obligated to report these events in clinical study reports. Research suggests that these events are often inadequately reported in publicly available reports. Because of the lack of these data and uncertainty about methods for synthesising them, individuals conducting systematic reviews and meta-analyses of therapeutic interventions often unknowingly overemphasise health benefit. To balance the overemphasis on benefit, scholars have called for more complete reporting of harm from clinical trials.

=== United Kingdom ===
The Yellow Card Scheme is a United Kingdom initiative run by the Medicines and Healthcare products Regulatory Agency (MHRA) and the Commission on Human Medicines (CHM) to gather information on adverse effects to medicines. This includes all licensed medicines, from medicines issued on prescription to medicines bought over the counter from a supermarket. The scheme also includes all herbal supplements and unlicensed medicines found in cosmetic treatments. Adverse drug reactions (ADRs) can be reported by a number of health care professionals including physicians, pharmacists and nurses, as well as patients.

=== United States ===
In the United States several reporting systems have been built, such as the Vaccine Adverse Event Reporting System (VAERS), the Manufacturer and User Facility Device Experience Database (MAUDE) and the Special Nutritionals Adverse Event Monitoring System. MedWatch is the main reporting center, operated by the Food and Drug Administration.

=== Australia ===
In Australia, adverse effect reporting is administered by the Adverse Drug Reactions Advisory Committee (ADRAC), a subcommittee of the Australian Drug Evaluation Committee (ADEC). Reporting is voluntary, and ADRAC requests healthcare professionals to report all adverse reactions to its current drugs of interest, and serious adverse reactions to any drug. ADRAC publishes the Australian Adverse Drug Reactions Bulletin every two months. The Government's Quality Use of Medicines program is tasked with acting on this reporting to reduce and minimize the number of preventable adverse effects each year.

=== New Zealand ===
Adverse reaction reporting is an important component of New Zealand's pharmacovigilance activities. The Centre for Adverse Reactions Monitoring (CARM) in Dunedin is New Zealand's national monitoring centre for adverse reactions. It collects and evaluates spontaneous reports of adverse reactions to medicines, vaccines, herbal products and dietary supplements from health professionals in New Zealand. Currently the CARM database holds over 80,000 reports and provides New Zealand-specific information on adverse reactions to these products, and serves to support clinical decision making when unusual symptoms are thought to be therapy related

=== Canada ===
In Canada, adverse reaction reporting is an important component of the surveillance of marketed health products conducted by the Health Products and Food Branch (HPFB) of Health Canada. Within HPFB, the Marketed Health Products Directorate leads the coordination and implementation of consistent monitoring practices with regards to assessment of signals and safety trends, and risk communications concerning regulated marketed health products.

MHPD also works closely with international organizations to facilitate the sharing of information. Adverse reaction reporting is mandatory for the industry and voluntary for consumers and health professionals.

=== Limitations ===
In principle, medical professionals are required to report all adverse effects related to a specific form of therapy. In practice, it is at the discretion of the professional to determine whether a medical event is at all related to the therapy. As a result, routine adverse effects reporting often may not include long-term and subtle effects that may ultimately be attributed to a therapy.

Part of the difficulty is identifying the source of a complaint. A headache in a patient taking medication for influenza may be caused by the underlying disease or may be an adverse effect of the treatment. In patients with end-stage cancer, death is a very likely outcome and whether the drug is the cause or a bystander is often difficult to discern.

== By situation ==
=== Medical procedures ===
Surgery may have a number of undesirable or harmful effects, such as infection, hemorrhage, inflammation, scarring, loss of function, or changes in local blood flow. They can be reversible or irreversible, and a compromise must be found by the physician and the patient between the beneficial or life-saving consequences of surgery versus its adverse effects. For example, a limb may be lost to amputation in case of untreatable gangrene, but the patient's life is saved. Presently, one of the greatest advantages of minimally invasive surgery, such as laparoscopic surgery, is the reduction of adverse effects.

Other nonsurgical physical procedures, such as high-intensity radiation therapy, may cause burns and alterations in the skin. In general, these therapies try to avoid damage to healthy tissues while maximizing the therapeutic effect.

Vaccination may have adverse effects due to the nature of its biological preparation, sometimes using attenuated pathogens and toxins. Common adverse effects may be fever, malaise and local reactions in the vaccination site. Very rarely, there is a serious adverse effect, such as eczema vaccinatum, a severe, sometimes fatal complication which may result in persons who have eczema or atopic dermatitis.

Diagnostic procedures may also have adverse effects, depending much on whether they are invasive, minimally invasive or noninvasive. For example, allergic reactions to radiocontrast materials often occur, and a colonoscopy may cause the perforation of the intestinal wall.

=== Medications ===
Adverse effects can occur as a collateral or side effect of many interventions, but they are particularly important in pharmacology, due to its wider, and sometimes uncontrollable, use by way of self-medication. Thus, responsible drug use becomes an important issue here. Adverse effects, like therapeutic effects of drugs, are a function of dosage or drug levels at the target organs, so they may be avoided or decreased by means of careful and precise pharmacokinetics, the change of drug levels in the organism in function of time after administration.

Adverse effects may also be caused by drug interaction. This often occurs when patients fail to inform their physician and pharmacist of all the medications they are taking, including herbal and dietary supplements. The new medication may interact agonistically or antagonistically (potentiate or decrease the intended therapeutic effect), causing significant morbidity and mortality around the world. Drug-drug and food-drug interactions may occur, and so-called "natural drugs" used in alternative medicine can have dangerous adverse effects. For example, extracts of St John's wort (Hypericum perforatum), a phytotherapic used for treating mild depression are known to cause an increase in the cytochrome P450 enzymes responsible for the metabolism and elimination of many drugs, so patients taking it are likely to experience a reduction in blood levels of drugs they are taking for other purposes, such as cancer chemotherapeutic drugs, protease inhibitors for HIV and hormonal contraceptives.

The scientific field of activity associated with drug safety is increasingly government-regulated, and is of major concern for the public, as well as to drug manufacturers. The distinction between adverse and nonadverse effects is a major undertaking when a new drug is developed and tested before marketing it. This is done in toxicity studies to determine the nonadverse effect level (NOAEL). These studies are used to define the dosage to be used in human testing (phase I), as well as to calculate the maximum admissible daily intake. Imperfections in clinical trials, such as insufficient number of patients or short duration, sometimes lead to public health disasters, such as those of fenfluramine (the so-called fen-phen episode), thalidomide and, more recently, of cerivastatin (Baycol, Lipobay) and rofecoxib (Vioxx), where drastic adverse effects were observed, such as teratogenesis, pulmonary hypertension, stroke, heart disease, neuropathy, and a significant number of deaths, causing the forced or voluntary withdrawal of the drug from the market.

Most drugs have a large list of nonsevere or mild adverse effects which do not rule out continued usage. These effects, which have a widely variable incidence according to individual sensitivity, include nausea, dizziness, diarrhea, malaise, vomiting, headache, dermatitis, dry mouth, etc. These can be considered a form of pseudo-allergic reaction, as not all users experience these effects; many users experience none at all.

The Medication Appropriateness Tool for Comorbid Health Conditions in Dementia (MATCH-D) warns that people with dementia are more likely to experience adverse effects, and that they are less likely to be able to reliably report symptoms.

==== Examples with specific medications ====
- Abortion, miscarriage or uterine hemorrhage associated with misoprostol (Cytotec), a labor-inducing drug (this is a case where the adverse effect has been used legally and illegally for performing abortions)
- Addiction to many sedatives and analgesics, such as diazepam, morphine, etc.
- Birth defects associated with thalidomide
- Bleeding of the intestine associated with aspirin therapy
- Cardiovascular disease associated with COX-2 inhibitors (i.e. Vioxx)
- Deafness and kidney failure associated with gentamicin (an antibiotic)
- Death, following sedation, in children using propofol (Diprivan)
- Depression or hepatic injury caused by interferon
- Diabetes caused by atypical antipsychotic medications (neuroleptic psychiatric drugs)
- Diarrhea caused by the use of orlistat (Xenical)
- Erectile dysfunction associated with many drugs, such as antidepressants
- Fever associated with vaccination
- Glaucoma associated with corticosteroid-based eye drops
- Hair loss and anemia may be caused by chemotherapy against cancer, leukemia, etc.
- Headache following spinal anaesthesia
- Hypertension in ephedrine users, which prompted FDA to remove the dietary supplement status of ephedra extracts
- Insomnia caused by stimulants, methylphenidate (Ritalin), Adderall, etc.
- Lactic acidosis associated with the use of stavudine (Zerit, for HIV therapy) or metformin (for diabetes)
- Mania caused by corticosteroids
- Liver damage from paracetamol
- Melasma and thrombosis associated with use of estrogen-containing hormonal contraception, such as the combined oral contraceptive pill
- Priapism associated with the use of sildenafil
- Rhabdomyolysis associated with statins (anticholesterol drugs)
- Seizures caused by withdrawal from benzodiazepines
- Drowsiness or increase in appetite due to antihistamine use. Some antihistamines are used in sleep aids explicitly because they cause drowsiness.
- Stroke or heart attack associated with sildenafil (Viagra), when used with nitroglycerin
- Suicide, increased tendency associated to the use of fluoxetine and other selective serotonin reuptake inhibitor (SSRI) antidepressants
- Tardive dyskinesia associated with use of metoclopramide and many antipsychotic medications

== Controversies ==
Sometimes, putative medical adverse effects are regarded as controversial and generate heated discussions in society and lawsuits against drug manufacturers. One example is the controversy as to whether autism was linked to the MMR vaccine (or to thiomersal, a mercury-based preservative used in some vaccines). The alleged correlation has been widely discredited by a large number studies, and despite removal of thimerosal from most early childhood vaccines beginning with those manufactured in 2003, the rate of autism has not decreased as would be expected if it had been the causative agent.

Another instance is the potential adverse effects of silicone breast implants, which led to class actions brought by tens of thousands of plaintiffs against manufacturers of gel-based implants, due to allegations of damage to the immune system which have not yet been conclusively proven. In 1998, Dow Corning settled its remaining suits for $3.2 Billion and went into bankruptcy.

Due to the exceedingly high impact on public health of widely used medications, such as hormonal contraception and hormone replacement therapy, which may affect millions of users, even marginal probabilities of adverse effects of a severe nature, such as breast cancer, have led to public outcry and changes in medical therapy, although its benefits largely surpassed the statistical risks.

== See also ==
- Adverse drug reaction
- Biosafety
- Classification of Pharmaco-Therapeutic Referrals
- Consultant pharmacist
- Drug interaction
- EudraVigilance
- Evidence-based medicine
- List of pharmaceutical companies
- List of withdrawn drugs
- Medical algorithm
- Medical prescription
- Nocebo
- Patient safety
- Perioperative mortality
- Pharmacotoxicology
- Placebo
- Pleiotropy (drugs)
- Polypharmacy
- Toxicology
