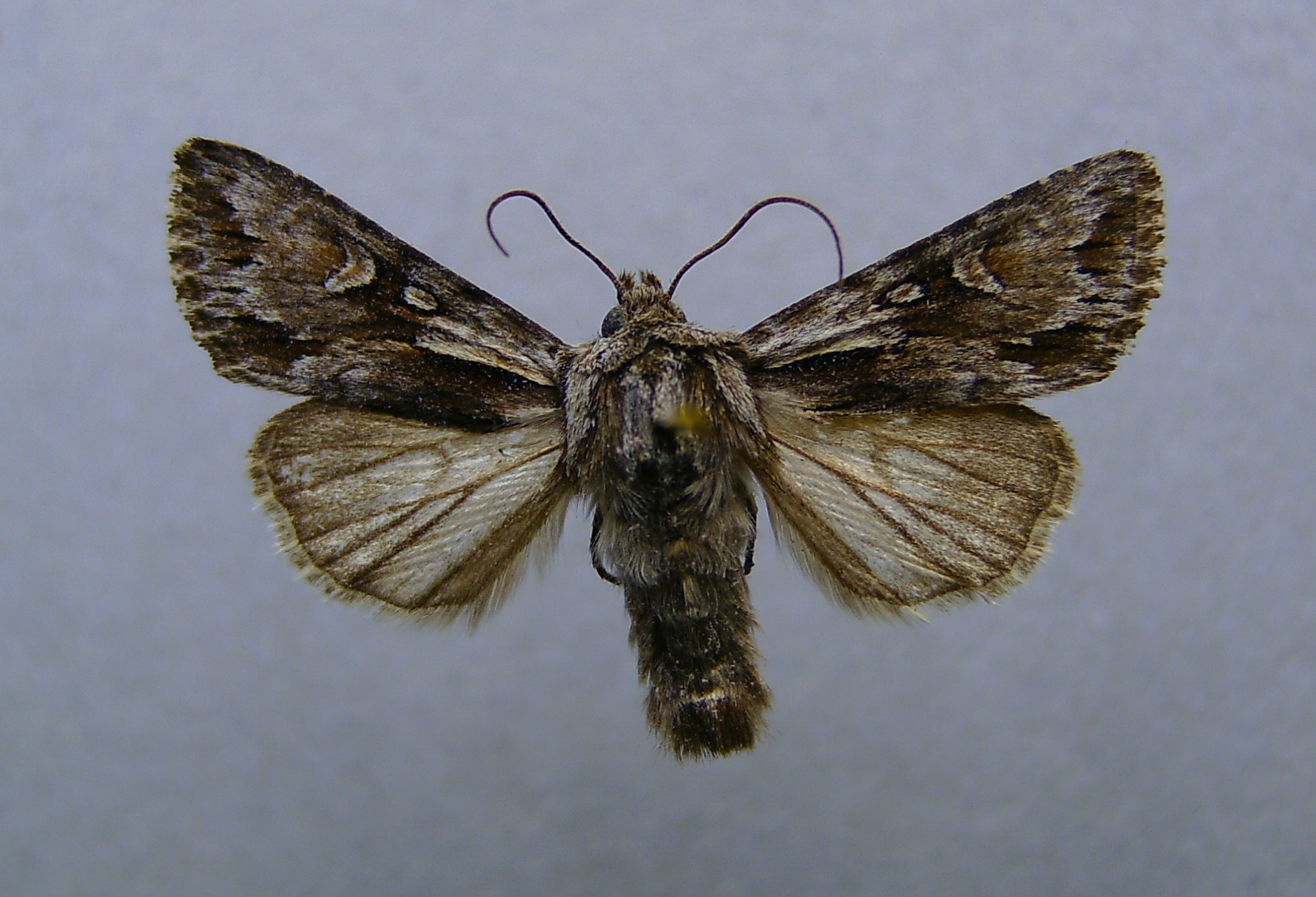

Scientific classification
- Domain: Eukaryota
- Kingdom: Animalia
- Phylum: Arthropoda
- Class: Insecta
- Order: Lepidoptera
- Superfamily: Noctuoidea
- Family: Noctuidae
- Genus: Chloantha
- Species: C. hyperici

Binomial name
- Chloantha hyperici (Denis & Schiffermüller, 1775)

Synonyms
- Noctua hyperici Denis & Schiffermüller, 1775; Chloantha hyperici var. dilutior Wagner, 1909; Actinotia hyperici

= Chloantha hyperici =

Species of moth

Chloantha hyperici, the pale-shouldered cloud, is a moth of the family Noctuidae. It is found in southern Central Europe and from southern Europe to the Near East and Anatolia, Israel, Iraq, the Persian Gulf and the Caucasus, as well as northern Denmark, southern Sweden, southern Norway and south-western Finland.

== Technical description and variation ==
A. hyperici F. (15 d). Forewing grey; a thick black streak from base below cell, above which the basal area is whitish, and below it dark fuscous reddish; this colour often also filling the cell and submedian fold, and the terminal area beyond subterminal line, which is marked by a series of thick black streaks between the veins; outer line finely lunulate-dentate; orbicular and reniform stigmata brown with pale rings, the former flattened; hindwing brownish, paler in the male; examples from Spain (Andalusia), males have the hindwing white, tinged with grey, and the veins dark: the abdomen pale grey, with the lateral and anal tufts pinkish; a very distinct form which may be called ab. laetior ab. nov. Larva redbrown; dorsal and subdorsal lines yellow, edged by dark brown: spiracular line broad and yellow. The wingspan is 30–34 mm.

== Subspecies ==
- Chloantha hyperici hyperici (southern Central Europe and from southern Europe to the Near East and Anatolia, Israel, Iraq, the Persian Gulf and the Caucasus)
- Chloantha hyperici svendseni (Fibiger, 1990) (northern Denmark, southern Sweden, southern Norway and south-western Finland)

== Biology ==
Adults are on wing in June and August in two generations in the north and in three generations in the south, with adults on wing from April to May, July to August and from September to October.

The larvae feed on Hypericum perforatum.
