= David Handelsman =

David Joshua Handelsman Professor
- Education: University of Melbourne, University of Sydney, Harbor‑UCLA Medical Center
- Occupation: Reproductive Endocrinologist
- Known for: Australia’s first Professor in Reproductive Endocrinology and Andrology
- Medical career
- Field: Reproductive Endocrinology and Andrology
- Institutions: ANZAC Research Institute
- Awards: Inaugural AMA Men's Health Award 2003 Officer of the Order of Australia (AO) 2018

David Joshua Handelsman, (AO) is trained in Medicine and Endocrinology. His expertise is in testicular function and androgen physiology, pharmacology, and toxicology. His experience spans basic, clinical, and public health domains including a recent focus on genetic models of androgen action, steroid mass spectrometry, and anti-doping science. He was Australia's first Professor in Reproductive Endocrinology and Andrology. He has worked in the US, Australia, and Germany. His professional involvement includes the World Health Organization (WHO) Human Reproduction Programme's Male Task Force, the United Nations Fund for Population Activities, Endocrine Society of Australia, World Anti-Doping Agency's Health, Medicine and Research Committee, and Australian Drug Evaluation Committee.

== Education ==
Handelsman obtained his MB BS from the University of Melbourne in 1974. In 1980 he became a Fellow of the Royal Australasian College of Physicians (Endocrinology). Handlesman gained his PhD in Medicine from the University of Sydney in 1984 with a thesis titled: Testicular function in uremia: clinical and experimental studies.

== Career ==
After holding positions as the National Health and Medical Research Council ( NHMRC) Neil Hamilton Fairley Overseas Fellow working at the Harbor‑UCLA Medical Center in Los Angeles from 1984 to 1985 and the Wellcome Senior Research Fellow in the Departments of Medicine & Obstetrics/Gynecology at the University of Sydney from 1987 to 1989, Handelsman was appointed Director, Andrology Unit, Royal Prince Alfred Hospital, Sydney from 1985 to 1998. From 1989 to 1996 he was associate professor, Departments of Medicine, Obstetrics & Gynecology, University of Sydney.

In 1995 Handelsman was visiting professor at the Institute of Reproductive Medicine, Munster, Germany.

Handelsman become Australia's first Professor in Reproductive Endocrinology and Andrology (Personal Chair), University of Sydney. In 1999 he was founding Head of Australia's first hospital Andrology Department at Concord Hospital. He has been founding Director of the ANZAC Research Institute since 1998.

During his career, Handelsman has served the maximum two terms on WHO Human Reproduction Programme's Male Task Force from 1988 to 1994 and is Ad hoc adviser to the WHO Human Reproduction Programme and United Nations Fund for Population Activities. He chaired the Endocrine Society of Australia's Writing Committee which created the first Australian national guidelines that are independent of the pharmaceutical industry. These guidelines are currently endorsed as the Pharmaceutical Benefits Scheme (PBS) guidelines for the prescription of androgen.

Handelsman has authored more than 300 scientific papers, supervised 17 PhD students, and 10 other graduate students with funding from peer-reviewed grants (National Health and Medical Research Council (NHMRC) and other national and international agencies) and industry contracts.He has been a peer reviewer for over 70 scientific journals and a member of the editorial board of twelve journals. He was a Member of the Scientific Committee for both the first (1990) and second (1995) International Androgen Workshop supported by WHO, the US National Institutes of Health (NIH) and the CONRAD organisation.

Handelsman is a member of the World Anti-Doping Agency’s Health, Medicine and Research Committee which monitors scientific developments in sport aiming to safeguard doping-free sport practice. From 1994 to 1998 he served as an Associate Member on the Australian Drug Evaluation Committee and was Principal Investigator in the proof-of-principle study that established the androgen-progestin combination as the most effective form of hormonal male contraception.

=== Essendon Football Club Doping Scandal ===
From February 2013 until late 2016, the Essendon Football Club, a professional Australian Rules Football club playing in the Australian Football League (AFL), was investigated by the Australian Sports Anti-Doping Authority (ASADA) and the World Anti-Doping Agency (WADA) over the legality of its supplements program during the 2012 AFL season and the preceding preseason. The various investigations received an extensive media coverage. Handelsman acted as ASADA's expert witness during the AFL Anti-Doping Tribunal.

=== The testosterone investigations and the Healthy Man study ===
In 2013 Handelsman published the first multinational survey of temporal trends in testosterone prescribing in response to anecdotal evidence of increased use of testosterone. The survey showed that off-label testosterone prescribing had increased because clinical guidelines endorsed testosterone prescribing for age-related functional androgen deficiency. This raised concerns because " [b]y eliminating the fundamental distinction between pathological and functional androgen deficiency, these guidelines tacitly promote increased testosterone prescribing, bypassing the requirement for high-quality clinical evidence of safety and efficacy and creating dramatic increases in prescription of testosterone products."

Continuing his research, with colleagues at the ANZAC Research Centre, Handelsman carried out the Healthy Man Study. Through analysis of over 300 very healthy ageing men it was found that drops in testosterone is more related to poor diet, obesity or smoking than ageing and that the excitement about so-called manopause is “a re-emergence of the rejuvenation fantasies that recur whenever society can afford such indulgences as believing that ageing can be somehow avoided.”

== Awards and Recognitions ==
Professor Handelsman has made and continues to make significant contributions nationally and internationally towards the establishment of evidence-based services for men's reproductive and general health ...His work has made it easier for men to talk about one of their big taboos - their own health.

— AMA President, Dr Kerryn Phelps as she presented the inaugural AMA Men's Health Award in 2003,

- 1992-1994 President of The Endocrine Society of Australia, member since 1978 and awarded Life membership in 2008.
- 1994 Royal Australasian College of Physician's Susman Prize for original medical research conducted in Australia.
- 1995-1999 Member, Therapeutics Advisory Committee, Royal Australian College of Physicians.
- 1997-2001 Secretary, International Society of Andrology.
- 1999–present Expert Advisory Panel, Australian Sports Drug Medical Advisory Committee (ASDMAC).
- 2001-2008 Represented Australia on International Society of Endocrinology Central Committee.
- 2002–present Member of Board, Andrology Australia (Australian Centre of Excellence in Male Reproductive Health.
- 2002 Member, Anti-Doping Research Panel, Sports section, Dept of Communications, IT & Arts.
- 2003 The inaugural AMA Men's Health Award acknowledging a major contribution to men's health in Australia.
- 2004 Program Organising Committee, Annual Scientific Meeting, American Society of Andrology.
- 2005 Scientific Organizing Committee, XVIII North American Testis Workshop, March–April.
- 2015–present Life Member of the Society for Reproductive Biology.
- 2015 Elected Fellow of the Australian Academy of Health and Medical Sciences.
- 2018 Officer of the Order of Australia (AO) for "distinguished service to medicine, particularly to reproductive endocrinology and andrology, as a clinician, author and researcher, to the science of doping in sport, and to medical education".
