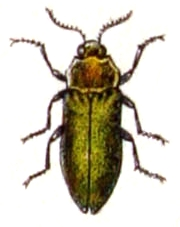

Scientific classification
- Domain: Eukaryota
- Kingdom: Animalia
- Phylum: Arthropoda
- Class: Insecta
- Order: Coleoptera
- Suborder: Polyphaga
- Infraorder: Elateriformia
- Family: Buprestidae
- Genus: Agrilus
- Species: A. hyperici

Binomial name
- Agrilus hyperici Creutzer

= Agrilus hyperici =

Species of beetle

Agrilus hyperici, the St. John's wort root borer, is a species of jewel beetle. It is used as an agent of biological pest control against common St. John's wort (Hypericum perforatum) in areas where it is a noxious weed or invasive species.

== Description ==
The adult beetle is narrow and elongated, reddish-brown in color and about 5 millimeters in length.

== Biology ==
The female deposits eggs low on the stem of the St. John's wort plant in July and August. The larva emerges from the egg and makes its way to the roots where it feeds on root tissue for the following year. Often the larvae consume nearly all the roots on a plant and then pupate inside the remnants. Few plants survive attack by this species. The beetle is known to attack the similar plant goldwire (Hypericum concinnum) in California, but it does not appear to have a destructive impact on this species.

== Distribution and habitat ==
This beetle is native to Europe. Its association with Hypericum perforatum has been known for a long time and it was first introduced to the United States for the purposes of biocontrol in 1950, in California. It is now established in much of the northwestern United States, especially in mountainous areas, and in Australia.
