= Chloantha elbursica =

Scientific classification
- Domain: Eukaryota
- Kingdom: Animalia
- Phylum: Arthropoda
- Class: Insecta
- Order: Lepidoptera
- Superfamily: Noctuoidea
- Family: Noctuidae
- Genus: Chloantha
- Species: C. elbursica

Binomial name
- Chloantha elbursica (Boursin, 1967)

Synonyms
- Actinotia elbursica Boursin, 1967

Species of moth in northern Iran

Chloantha elbursica is a moth of the family Noctuidae. It is only known from the Alborz mountains in northern Iran.
