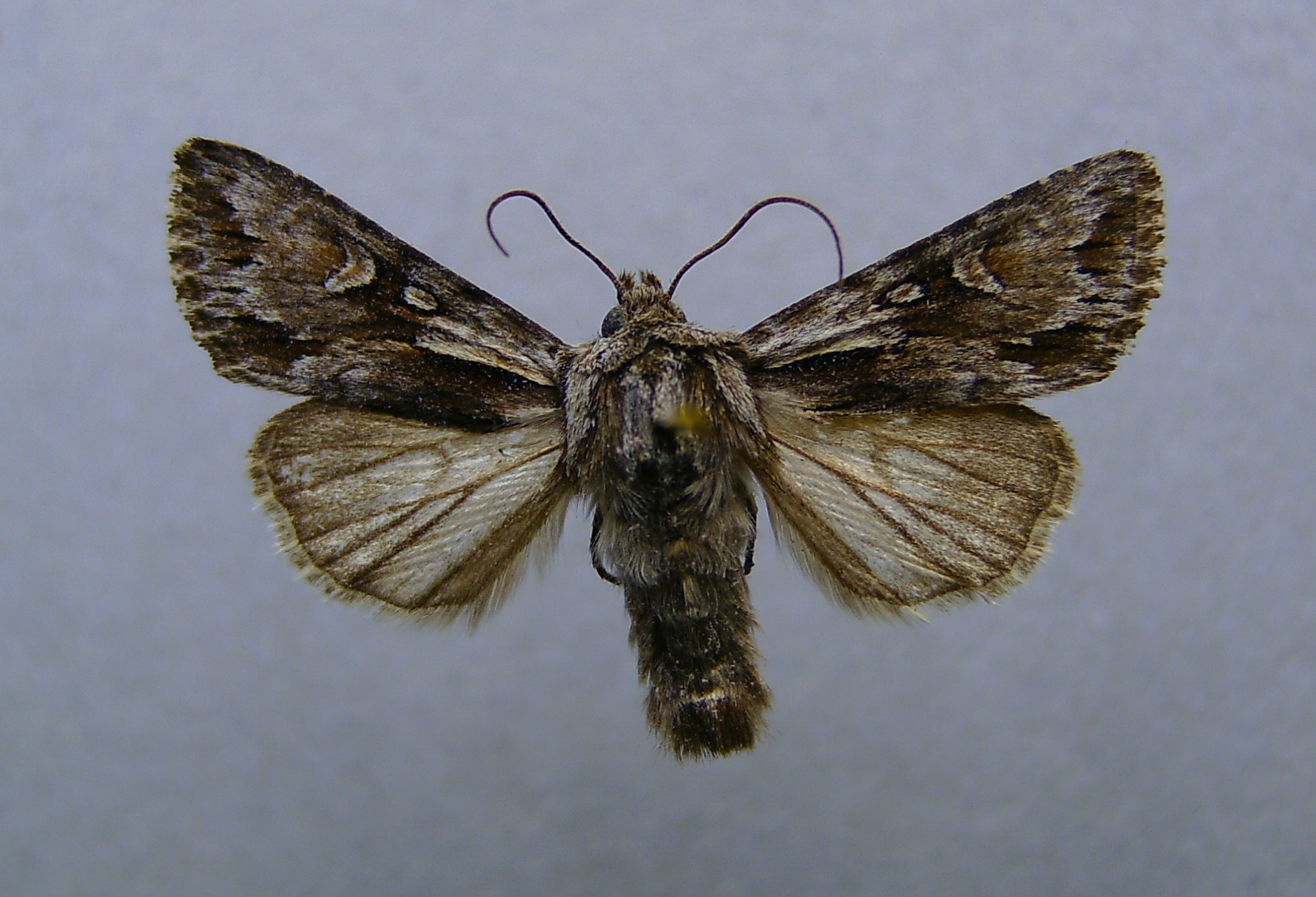
- Chloantha hyperici

Scientific classification
- Kingdom: Animalia
- Phylum: Arthropoda
- Class: Insecta
- Order: Lepidoptera
- Superfamily: Noctuoidea
- Family: Noctuidae
- Subfamily: Xyleninae
- Genus: Chloantha; Boisduval, Rambur & Graslin, [1836]

= Chloantha =

Genus of moths

Chloantha is a genus of moths of the family Noctuidae.

== Species ==
- Chloantha elbursica (Boursin, 1967)
- Chloantha hyperici (Denis & Schiffermüller, 1775)
