= John Scouler =

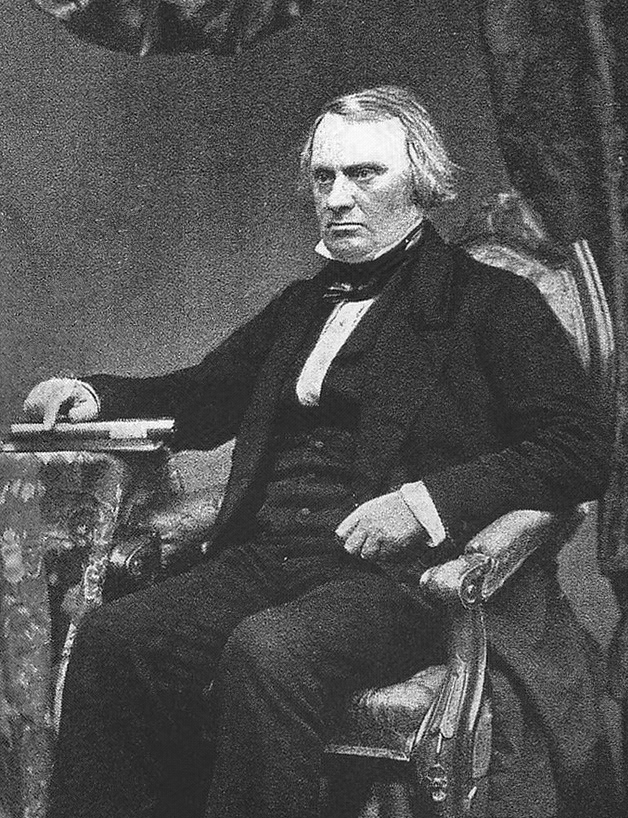
John Scouler

John Scouler (31 December 1804 – 13 November 1871) was a Scottish naturalist.

== Life ==
Scouler, the son of a calico-printer, was born in Glasgow on 31 December 1804. He received the rudiments of his education at Kilbarchan, but was sent very early to the University of Glasgow. When his medical course there was completed, he went to Paris and studied at the Jardin des Plantes.

On moving to England, Dr. (afterwards Sir) William Jackson Hooker secured for him an appointment as surgeon and naturalist on board the Hudson's Bay Company's ship William and Ann. The vessel sailed from London on 25 July 1824 for the Columbia River, touching at Madeira, Rio de Janeiro and the Galapagos. His companion on the voyage out and in many excursions at the several ports was the botanist, David Douglas. Scouler's journal of the voyage reports the instruction he received from early workers on Vancouver's expedition, such as Archibald Menzies, familiarising himself with the botany of the region and the preparation of specimens.

His stay at the Columbia river appears to have lasted from April to September 1825. The voyage returned in the early part of 1826.

Soon after his return to England, Scouler shipped as surgeon on the Clyde, a merchant vessel that went to Calcutta, touching by the way at Cape Horn and Madras.

On his return to Glasgow, he settled down to practice medicine (graduating M.D. in 1827), until he was appointed, on 18 June 1829, professor of geology and natural history and mineralogy in the Andersonian University. In 1834, he was appointed professor of mineralogy, and subsequently of geology, zoology, and botany, to the Royal Dublin Society, a post he held until his retirement on a pension in 1854, when he returned to Glasgow.

The state of his health in 1853 and 1854 induced him to visit Portugal. He also made a tour in the Netherlands and, in later years, visited Scandinavia. After his retirement he occasionally lectured and he superintended the Andersonian Museum. He had been elected a fellow of the Linnean Society in 1829, and made LL.D. of Glasgow in 1850. He died at Glasgow on 13 November 1871. He was buried at Kilbarchan.

Scouler was the author of more than twenty papers on various natural history subjects and meteorology published between 1826 and 1852. He established, with two medical colleagues, the Glasgow Medical Journal, and in 1831 was one of the editors of Cheek's Edinburgh Journal of Natural and Geographical Science. He contributed notes and an appendix to the fourth edition of Dr. King's Principles of Geology explained (8vo, Edinburgh, 1853). Scouleria, a genus of plants, and Scoulerite, a mineral, were named in his honour.

Other species epithets, such as Enicurus scouleri and Hypericum scouleri commemorate his name. Scouler made large collections of specimens in the western regions of North America and the Galapagos.

He bequeathed his books, which included many of great rarity, to Stirling's Library in Glasgow.
