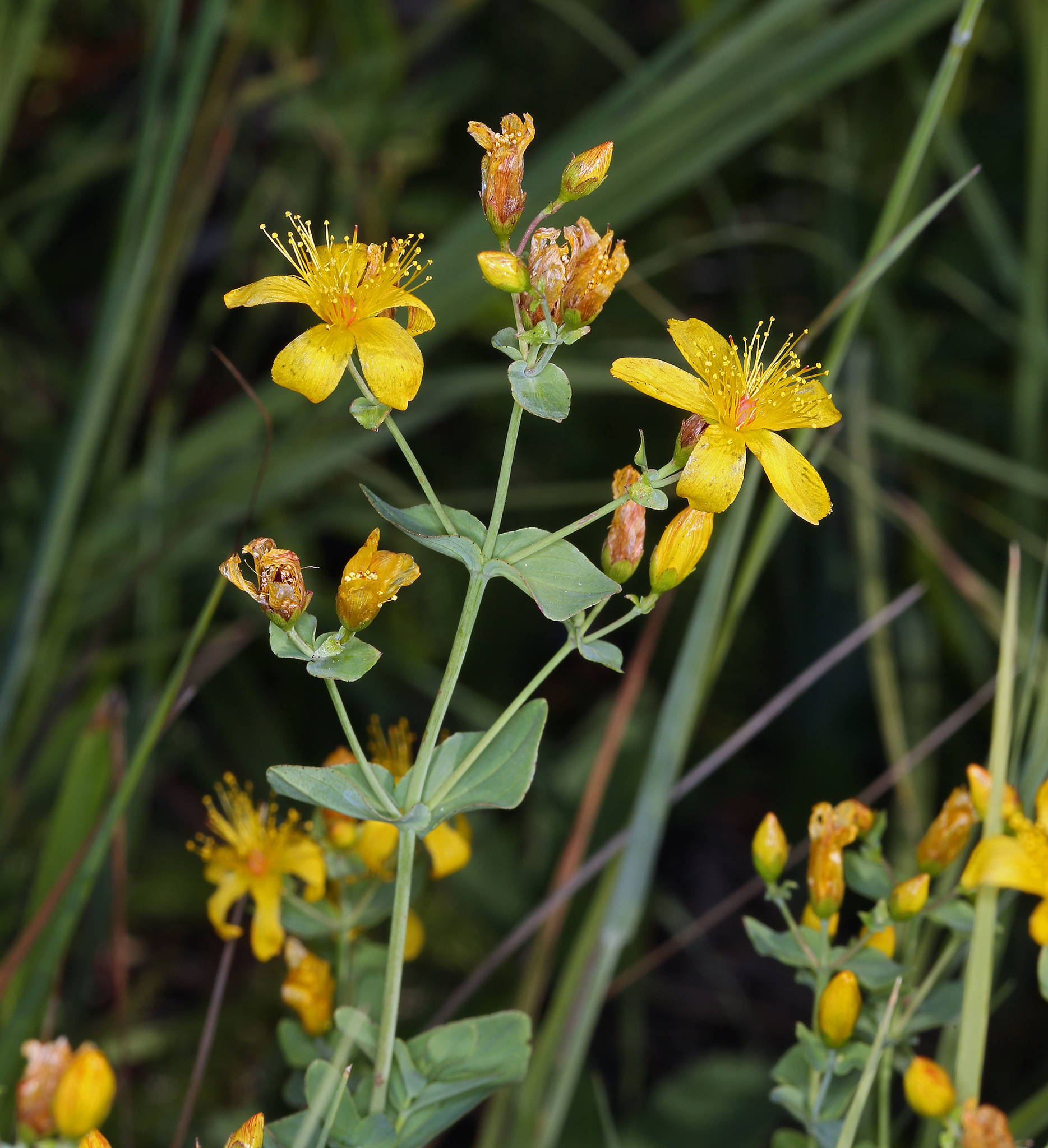
- Flowers and upper stems, Shasta-Trinity National Forest, California

Conservation status
- Secure (NatureServe)

Scientific classification
- Kingdom: Plantae
- Clade: Tracheophytes
- Clade: Angiosperms
- Clade: Eudicots
- Clade: Rosids
- Order: Malpighiales
- Family: Hypericaceae
- Genus: Hypericum
- Species: H. scouleri

Binomial name
- Hypericum scouleri Hook.

Synonyms
- List: Hypericum collinum var. schmitzii R.Keller (1908); Hypericum formosum A.Gray (1853); Hypericum formosum var. nortoniae (M.E.Jones) C.L.Hitchc. (1961); Hypericum formosum subsp. scouleri (Hook.) C.L.Hitchc. (1961); Hypericum formosum var. scouleri (Hook.) J.M.Coult. (1886); Hypericum nortoniae M.E.Jones (1910); Hypericum simulans Rose (1906)

= Hypericum scouleri =

Species of St. John's wort

Hypericum scouleri, known by the common name Scouler's St. John's wort in English, is a flowering species of plant from western North America. It grows in areas around streams and wetlands from Canada to the highlands of Mexico. It is sometimes mistaken for the invasive Perforate St John's wort from Eurasia.

== Description ==
Hypericum scouleri is a herbaceous plant with stems that are either vertical or grow outwards a short distance before curving to grow upwards. At full size stems typically range from 5 to 66 centimeters in height, but occasionally may reach 80 cm. The stems sprout from a creeping rootstock. Infrequently, the stems may be branched. Between nodes the stems usually have two faint lines, but also may lack them. They do not have black glands, but will occasionally have reddish ones.

The leaves are attached on opposite sides of the stems at the nodes and usually spread outwards, but occasionally they may point upwards instead. The leaf shape varies and may resemble an egg with the largest part towards the base (ovate leaves), have curved sides with the widest portion in the middle (elliptic leaves), or be an oblong rectangle with rounded corners (oblong leaves). They range in size from 12–32 millimeters in length, but are more often shorter than 28 mm, and 6–18 mm in width. The leaves are also covered in oil glands that are black, but translucent if held up to the light.

=== Flowers ===
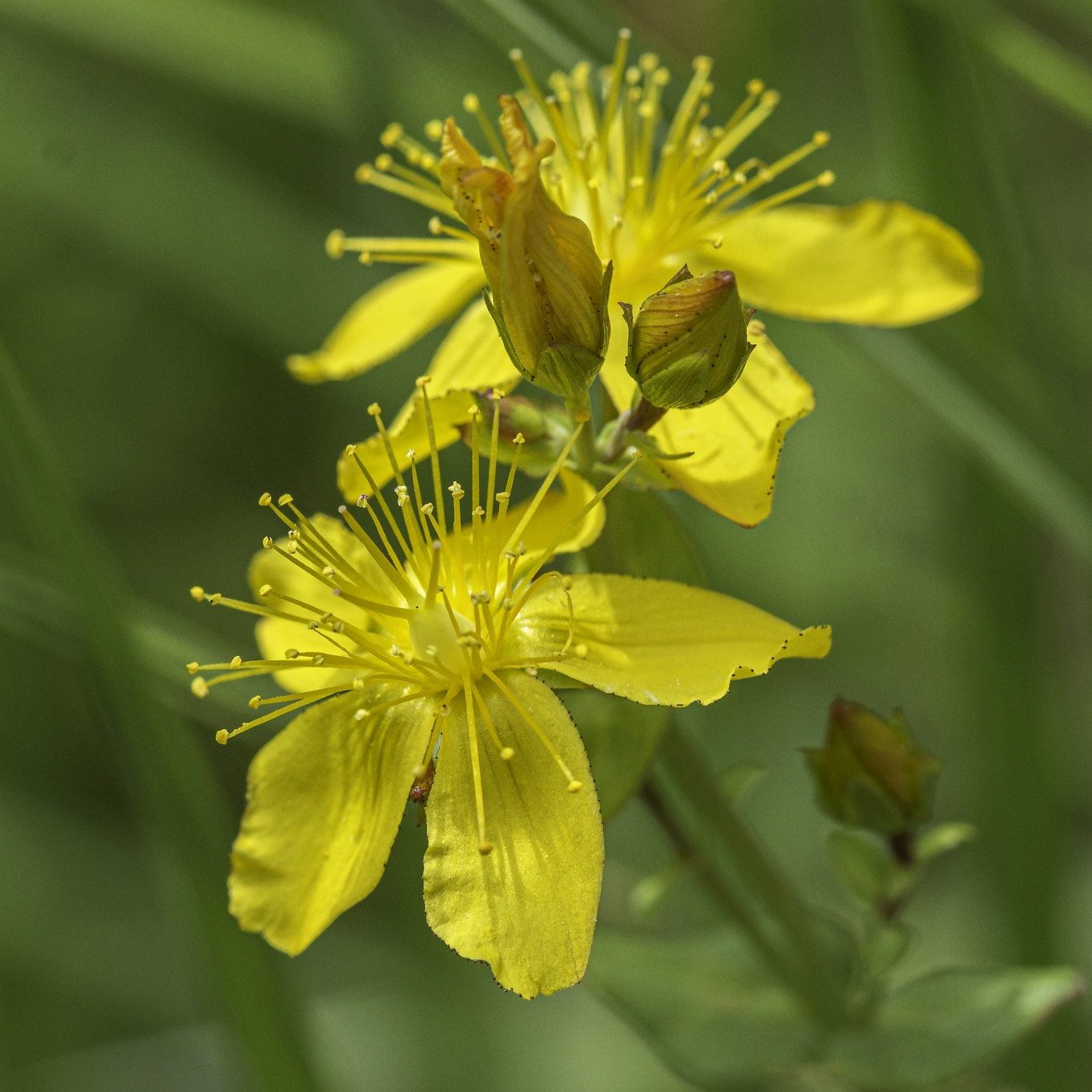
Flowers and buds photographed in Santa Fe National Forest, Sandoval County, New Mexico

Hypericum scouleri has flowers that are bright yellow and resemble stars with their five petals and long stamens. The petals may sometimes be blushed with red. Like the leaves, the petals have oil glands. The flowers are in clusters of eight to twenty at the ends of stems in a roughly pyramidal or cylindrical inflorescence. Occasionally there may be fewer flowers in an inflorescence. They most often are 6–15 millimeters in diameter, but may sometimes reach as much as 25 mm across. At the rear of a bloom, the sepals are egg shaped and 2–5 mm long. The number of stamens is very large, from 50 to as many as 109.

The fruit is a capsule that is 6–10 millimeters in length and 3.5–6 mm wide with three lobes and oil tubes (vittae) running the length. The seeds are smaller than 1 mm and brown in color and do not have ridged shape.

It greatly resembles its European relative Common St John's wort (Hypericum perforatum). They can be distinguished by Hypericum scouleri generally growing in wet meadows and along streams instead of dry habitats and the leaves being wider in H. scouleri. In addition Common St John's wort has more branched stems and its flowers are in a cluster with a flat top.

== Taxonomy ==
The botanist Sir William Jackson Hooker scientifically described and named Hypericum scouleri in 1831. The name Hypericum formosum was illegitimately used by American botanist Asa Gray in 1853 to describe the species. Though the species is generally accepted, there are differences on the status of its subdivisions. It is listed as having no valid subspecies by Plants of the World Online, World Flora Online, and World Plants. Other sources, such as the USDA Natural Resources Conservation Service PLANTS database, continue to list two subspecies, Hypericum scouleri ssp. nortoniae and Hypericum scouleri ssp. scouleri.

Studies of genetics show that the most closely related species is Hypericum formosum.

=== Names ===
Hooker named the species scouleri to honor the naturalist John Scouler who accompanied David Douglas on his expedition to the Columbia River in the 1820s. In English it is generally called Scouler's St. John's wort. It is also called Western St. John's wort on occasion, however this name is more commonly applied to Hypericum formosum.

== Range and habitat ==
Hypericum scouleri grows in western North America from southern Canada to central Mexico. In Canada it grows in the provinces of British Columbia and Alberta. Within British Columbia it is known from the southern portion of Vancouver Island and the interior mountains in the south of the province. In the United States the species grows from the Pacific coast to the Rocky Mountain States, being limited to the mountainous portions of Montana, Wyoming, Colorado, and New Mexico. In Mexico it grows in four states, Chihuahua, Zacatecas, Michoacán, and Hidalgo.

Hypericum scouleri prefers moist locations such as streambanks and openings in well watered quaking aspen groves. In the Rocky Mountains they grow at the same elevation as ponderosa pines or in spruce-fir forests in the montane ecosystem. In the Great Basin it grows in riparian areas in the sagebrush steppe as well as into more mountainous areas. It will often grow in fairly large colonies.

== Ecology ==
The klamathweed beetle (Chrysolina quadrigemina) was introduced to North America as a biological pest control agent for Common St. John's wort. Though in laboratory tests the beetles do successfully complete their lifecycle on Hypericum scouleri and related native species, it has not been reported to feed on it in natural conditions. Scientists speculate this may be due to the different habitats that the two plant species require.

In 2019 NatureServe evaluated Hypericum scouleri as globally secure (G5), meaning it has no significant threats or known declines in population. At the local level they evaluated it as secure (S5) in British Columbia. In neighboring Alberta they gave it the status of critically imperiled (S1). In the United States they evaluated it as apparently secure (S4) in Wyoming and vulnerable (S3) in Nevada, but have not evaluated the rest of the species range.
