= Pharmacotoxicology =

Pharmacotoxicology entails the study of the consequences of toxic exposure to pharmaceutical drugs and agents in the health care field. The field of pharmacotoxicology also involves the treatment and prevention of pharmaceutically induced side effects. Pharmacotoxicology can be separated into two different categories: pharmacodynamics (the effects of a drug on an organism), and pharmacokinetics (the effects of the organism on the drug).

== Mechanisms of Pharmaceutical Drug Toxicity ==
There are many mechanisms by which pharmaceutical drugs can have toxic implications. A very common mechanism is covalent binding of either the drug or its metabolites to specific enzymes or receptor in tissue-specific pathways that then will elicit toxic responses. Covalent binding can occur during both on-target and off-target situations and after biotransformation.

=== On-target toxicity. ===
On-target toxicity is also referred to as mechanism-based toxicity. This type of adverse effect that results from pharmaceutical drug exposure is commonly due to interactions of the drug with its intended target. In this case, both the therapeutic and toxic targets are the same. To avoid toxicity during treatment, many times the drug needs to be changed to target a different aspect of the illness or symptoms. Statins are an example of a drug class that can have toxic effects at the therapeutic target (HMG CoA reductase).

=== Immune Responses ===
Some pharmaceuticals can initiate allergic reactions, as in the case of penicillins. In some people, administration of penicillin can induce production of specific antibodies and initiate an immune response. Activation of this response when unwarranted can cause severe health concerns and prevent proper immune system functioning. Immune responses to pharmaceutical exposure can be very common in accidental contamination events. Tamoxifen, a selective estrogen receptor modulator, has been shown to alter the humoral adaptive immune response in gilthead seabream. In this case, pharmaceuticals can produce adverse effects not only in humans, but also in organisms that are unintentionally exposed.

=== Off-target toxicity ===
Adverse effects at targets other than those desired for pharmaceutical treatments often occur with drugs that are nonspecific. If a drug can bind to unexpected proteins, receptors, or enzymes that can alter different pathways other than those desired for treatment, severe downstream effects can develop. An example of this is the drug eplerenone (aldosterone receptor antagonist), which should increase aldosterone levels, but has shown to produce atrophy of the prostate.

=== Bioactivation ===
Bioactivation is a crucial step in the activity of certain pharmaceuticals. Often, the parent form of the drug is not the active form and it needs to be metabolized in order to produce its therapeutic effects. In other cases, bioactivation is not necessarily needed for drugs to be active and can instead produce reactive intermediates that initiate stronger adverse effects than the original form of the drug. Bioactivation can occur through the action Phase I metabolic enzymes, such as cytochrome P450 or peroxidases. Reactive intermediates can cause a loss of function in some enzymatic pathways or can promote the production of reactive oxygen species, both of which can increase stress levels and alter homeostasis.

=== Drug-drug interactions ===
Drug-drug interactions can occur when certain drugs are administered at the same time. Effects of this can be additive (outcome is greater than those of one individual drug), less than additive (therapeutic effects are less than those of one individual drug), or functional alterations (one drug changes how another is absorbed, distributed, and metabolized). Drug-drug interactions can be of serious concern for patients who are undergoing multi-drug therapies. Coadministration of chloroquine, an anti-malaria drug, and statins for treatment of cardiovascular diseases has been shown to cause inhibition of organic anion-transporting polypeptides (OATPs) and lead to systemic statin exposure.

== Pharmacotoxicity Examples ==
There are many different pharmaceutical drugs that can produce adverse effects after biotransformation, interaction with alternate targets, or through drug-drug interactions. All pharmaceuticals can be toxic, depending on the dose.

=== Acetaminophen ===
Acetaminophen (APAP) is a very common drug used to treat pain. High doses of acetaminophen has been shown to produce severe hepatotoxicity after being biotransformed to produce reactive intermediates. Acetaminophen is metabolized by CYP2E1 to produce NAPQI, which then causes significant oxidative stress due to increased reactive oxygen species (ROS). ROS can cause cellular damage in a multitude of ways, a few of which being DNA and mitochondrial damage and depletion of antioxidant enzymes such as glutathione. In terms of drug-drug interactions, acetaminophen activates CAR, a nuclear receptor involved in the production of metabolic enzymes, which increases the metabolism of other drugs. This could either cause reactive intermediates/drug activity to persist for longer than necessary, or the drug will be cleared quicker than normal and prevent any therapeutic actions from occurring. Ethanol induces CYP2E1 enzymes in the liver, which can lead to increased NAPQI formation in addition to that formed by acetaminophen.

=== Aspirin ===
Aspirin is an NSAID used to treat inflammation and pain. Overdoses or treatments in conjunction with other NSAIDs can produce additive effects, which can lead to increased oxidative stress and ROS activity. Chronic exposure to aspirin can lead to CNS toxicity and eventually affect respiratory function.

=== Anti-depressants ===
Anti-depressants have been prescribed since the 1950s, and their prevalence has significantly increased since then. There are many classes of anti-depressant pharmaceuticals, such as selective serotonin reuptake inhibitors (SSRIs), monoamine oxidase inhibitors (MAOIs), and tricyclic anti-depressants. Many of these drugs, especially the SSRIs, function by blocking the metabolism or reuptake of neurotransmitters to treat depression and anxiety. Chronic exposure or overdose of these pharmaceuticals can lead to serotonin and CNS hyperexcitation, weight changes, and, in severe cases, suicide.

=== Anti-cancer drugs ===
Doxorubicin is a very effective anti-cancer drug that causes congestive heart failure while treating tumors. Doxorubicin is an uncoupling agent in that it inhibits proper functioning of complex I of the electron transport chain in mitochondria. It then leads to the production of ROS and the inhibition of ATP production. Doxorubicin has been shown to be selectively toxic to cardiac tissue, although some toxicity has been seen in other tissues as well. Other anti-cancer drugs, such as fluoropyrimidines and taxanes, are extremely effective at treating and reducing tumor proliferation, but have high incidences of cardiac arrhythmias and myocardial infarctions.
