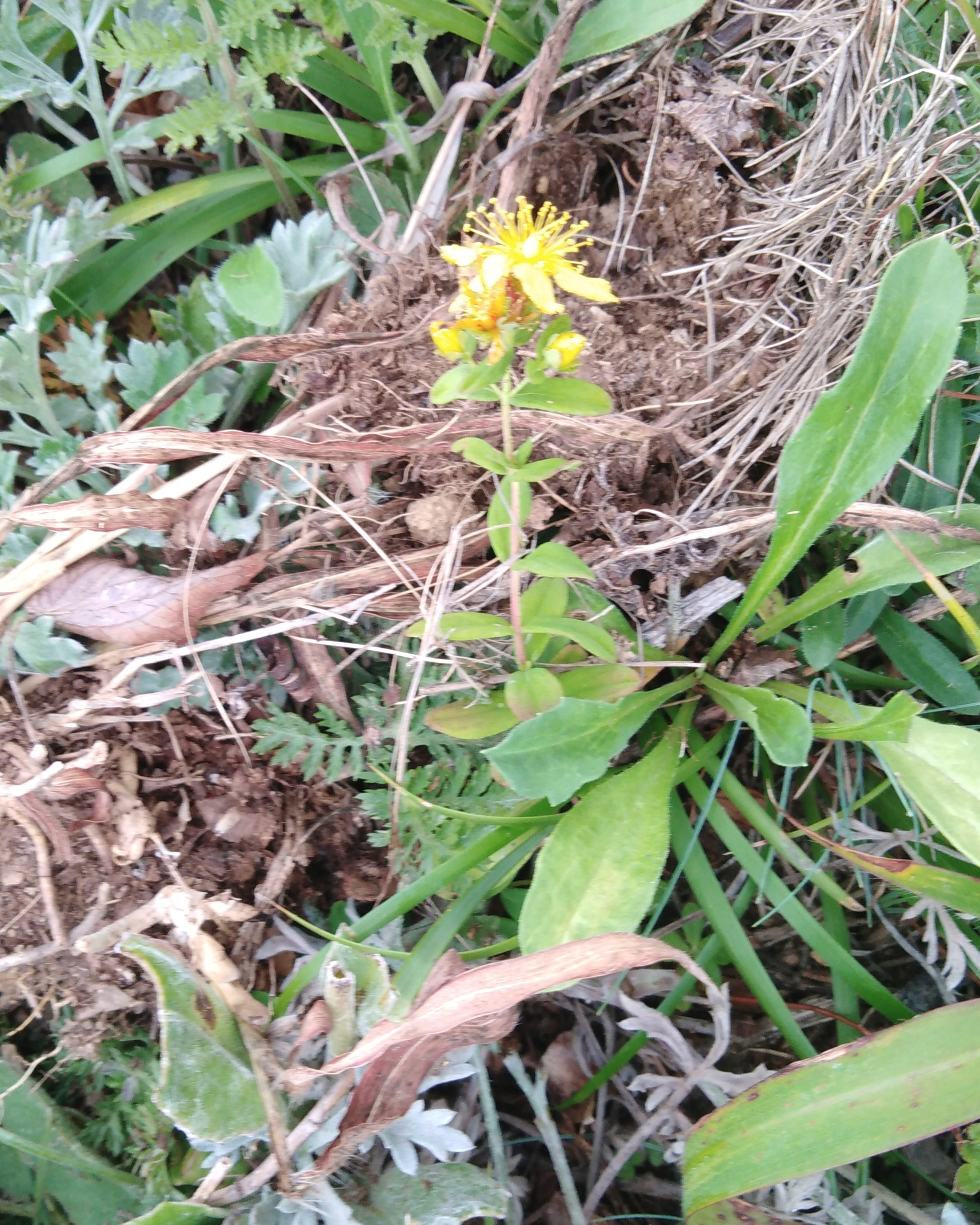

Scientific classification
- Kingdom: Plantae
- Clade: Tracheophytes
- Clade: Angiosperms
- Clade: Eudicots
- Clade: Rosids
- Order: Malpighiales
- Family: Hypericaceae
- Genus: Hypericum
- Species: H. attenuatum

Binomial name
- Hypericum attenuatum Fisch. ex Choisy

= Hypericum attenuatum =

Species of flowering plant in the St John's wort family

Hypericum attenuatum is a species of perennial herbaceous flowering plant in the family Hypericaceae.
