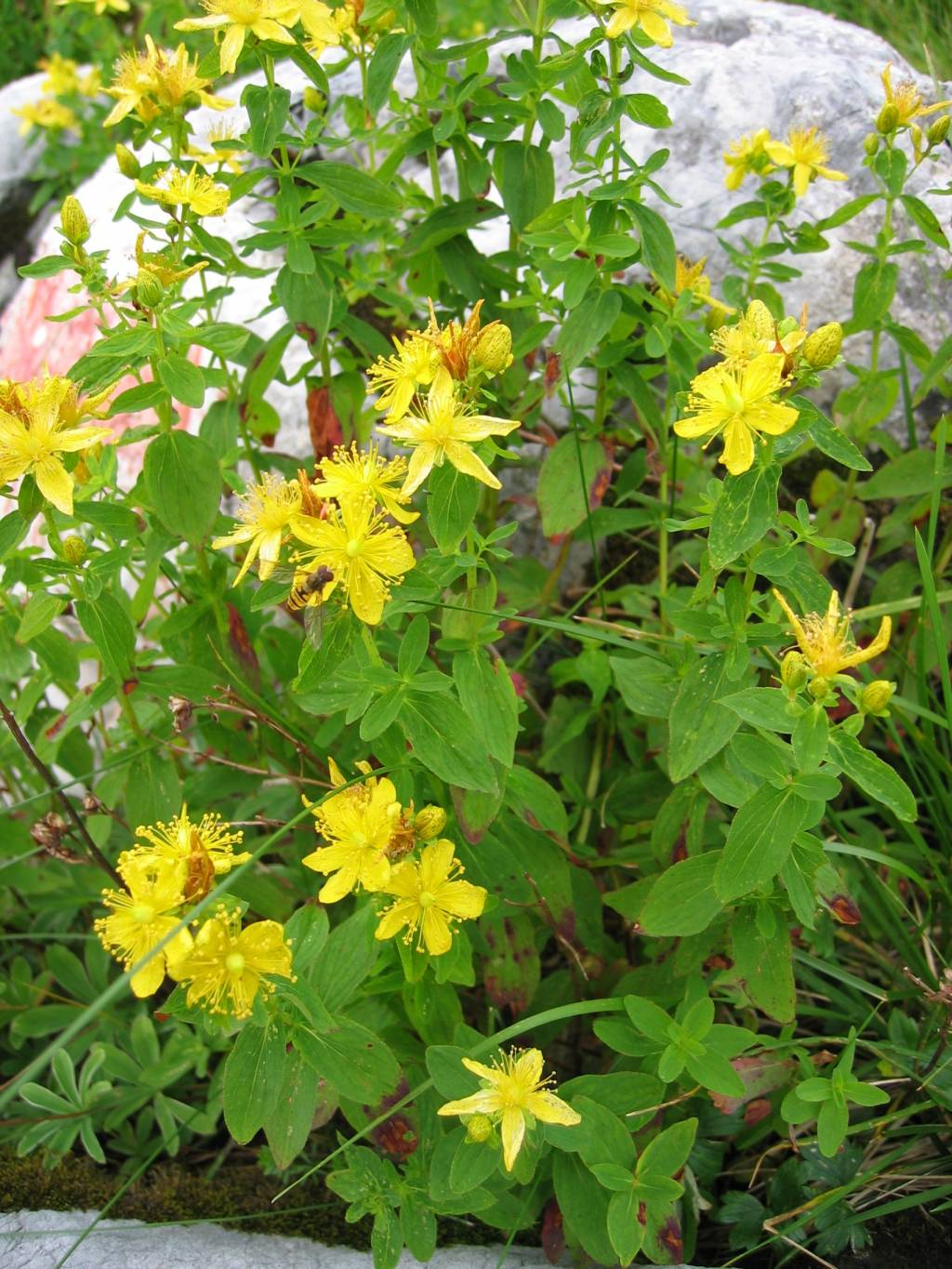

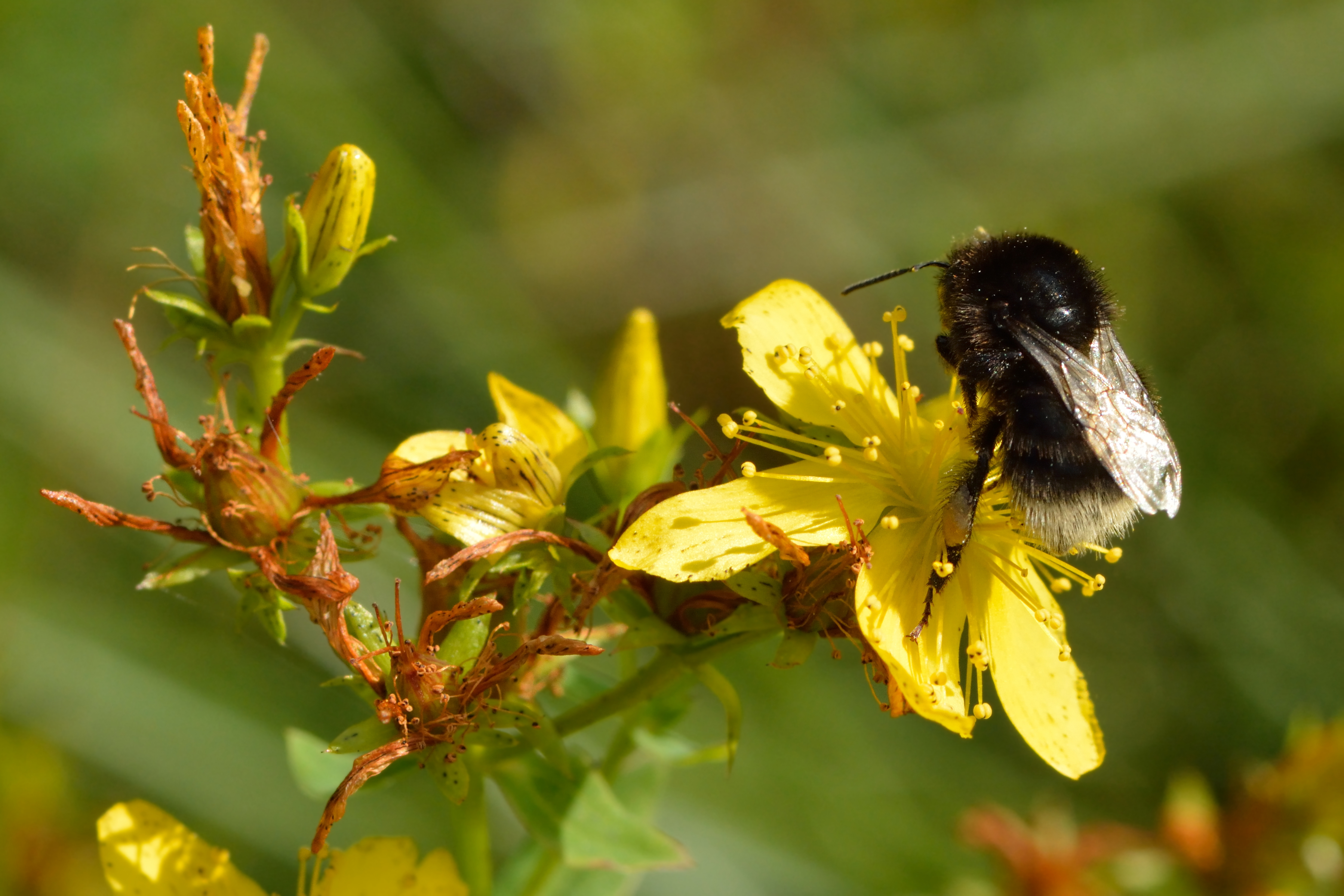

Scientific classification
- Kingdom: Plantae
- Clade: Tracheophytes
- Clade: Angiosperms
- Clade: Eudicots
- Clade: Rosids
- Order: Malpighiales
- Family: Hypericaceae
- Genus: Hypericum
- Section: Hypericum sect. Hypericum
- Species: H. maculatum

Binomial name
- Hypericum maculatum Crantz

= Hypericum maculatum =

Species of flowering plant in the St John's wort family

Hypericum maculatum, commonly known as imperforate St John's-wort, or spotted St. Johnswort, is a species of perennial herbaceous flowering plant in the family Hypericaceae. It is native to Europe and Western Asia where it grows in moist meadows.

== Description ==
Hypericum maculatum is a hairless perennial herbaceous plant growing to about 60 cm (24 in). The stem is square in cross section, but without the wings shown in H. tetrapterum. The leaves are simple, entire (undivided) and in opposite pairs, without stipules and have few or no translucent glands. There may be black dots on the leaves, petals and sepals. The flowers are yellow, up to about 25 mm (0.98 in) across. The species hybridises with Hypericum perforatum to produce Des Etang's St John's wort, Hypericum x desetangsii.

== Uses ==
It is considered to be a medicinal plant. Hypericum maculatum herb has been used in the traditional Austrian medicine internally as tea or oil extract, and externally as oil extract, ointment or cold maceration in ethanol for treatment of disorders of the skin, locomotor system, nervous system, gastrointestinal tract, respiratory tract, kidneys and urinary tract, cardiovascular system, infections, rheumatism and gout.
