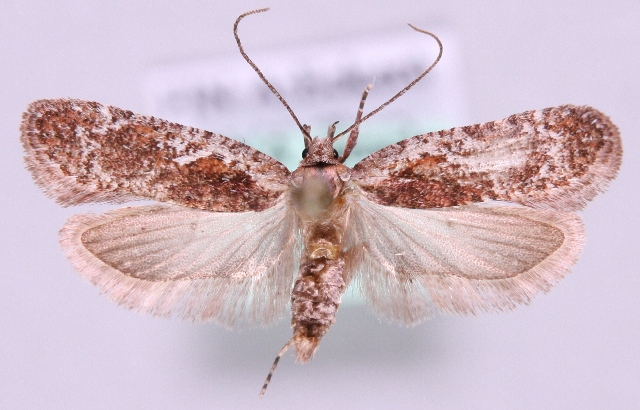

Scientific classification
- Kingdom: Animalia
- Phylum: Arthropoda
- Clade: Pancrustacea
- Class: Insecta
- Order: Lepidoptera
- Family: Depressariidae
- Genus: Agonopterix
- Species: A. hypericella

Binomial name
- Agonopterix hypericella (Hubner, 1817)

Synonyms
- Tinea hypericella Hubner, 1817; Haemylis impurella Treitschke, 1835; Depressaria liturella ab. subliturella Krulikowsky, 1908; Depressaria conterminella var. atrella Caradja, 1920

= Agonopterix hypericella =

Species of moth

Agonopterix hypericella is a moth of the family Depressariidae. It is found from Fennoscandia to Italy, Austria and Slovakia and from Germany and Switzerland to Russia. It has also been recorded from Bulgaria.

The wingspan is 15–17 mm. Adults are on wing from February to September.

The larvae feed on Hypericum species.
