= Adverse Drug Reactions Advisory Committee =

The Adverse Drug Reactions Advisory Committee or ADRAC was a subcommittee of the Australian Drug Evaluation Committee (ADEC) which monitored the safety of medicines in Australia. ADRAC was replaced by the Advisory Committee on the Safety of Medicines (ACSOM) in 2010. In 2017, the Advisory Committee on Medicines (ACM) was established, consolidating the functions of the Advisory Committee on Prescription Medicines (ACPM), the Advisory Committee on the Safety of Medicines (ACSOM) and the Advisory Committee on Non-Prescription Medicines (ACNM).

ADRAC evaluated reports from the Adverse Drug Reactions Unit (now a function of the Pharmacovigilance Branch) of the Therapeutic Goods Administration (TGA), which administers the adverse drug reaction (ADR) reporting system in Australia, and makes recommendations regarding the medication including withdrawal of medications from the market. ADRAC also published the Australian Adverse Drug Reactions Bulletin (now Medicines Safety Update) to raise awareness of medication safety issues and ADR reports.
