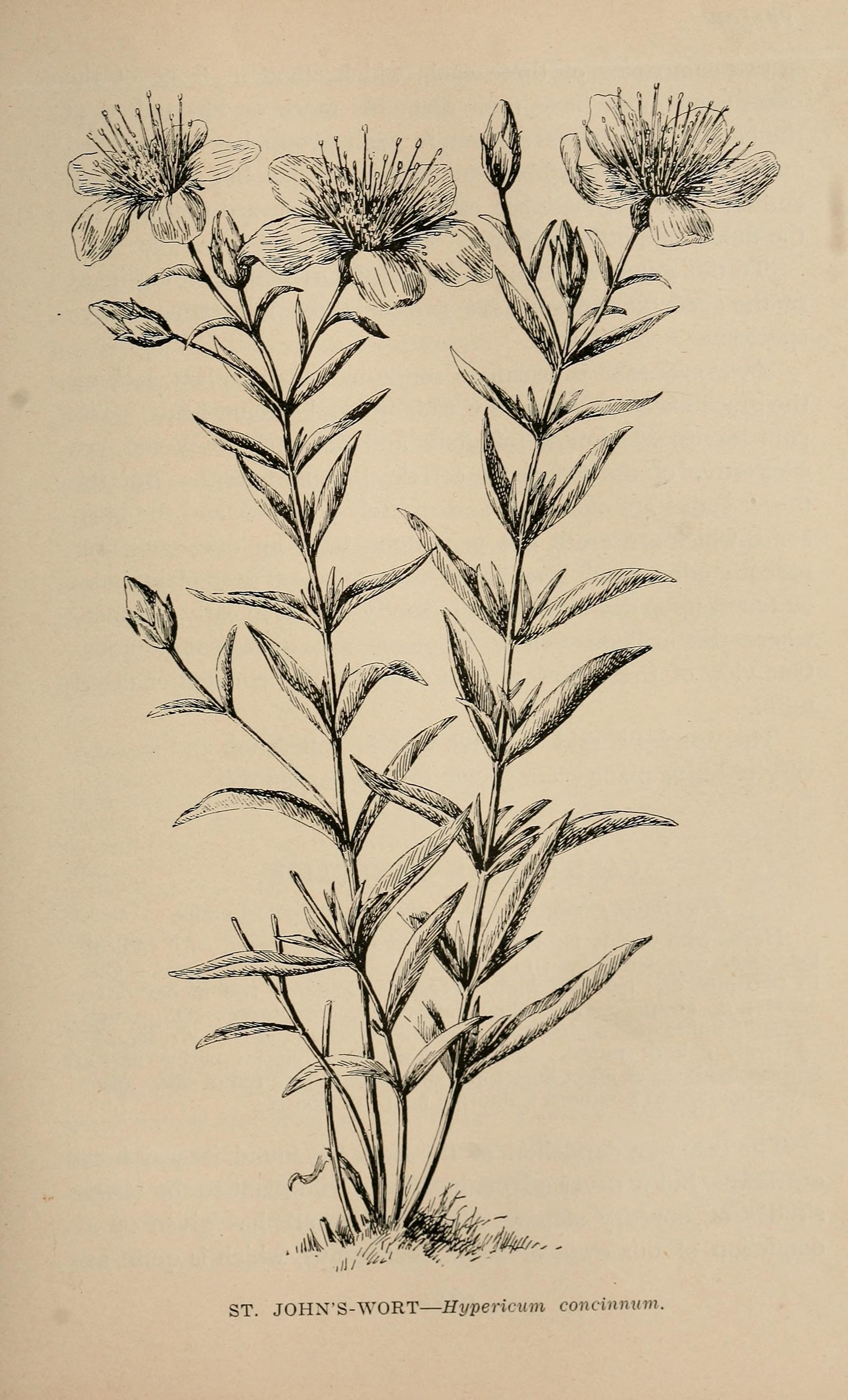

Conservation status
- Apparently Secure (NatureServe)

Scientific classification
- Kingdom: Plantae
- Clade: Tracheophytes
- Clade: Angiosperms
- Clade: Eudicots
- Clade: Rosids
- Order: Malpighiales
- Family: Hypericaceae
- Genus: Hypericum
- Section: Hypericum sect. Concinna; N.Robson
- Species: H. concinnum

Binomial name
- Hypericum concinnum Benth.

= Hypericum concinnum =

Species of flowering plant in the St John's wort family

Hypericum concinnum is a species of flowering plant known as gold-wire or goldwire. It is in the St. John's wort family, Hypericaceae. It is the only species in the section Hypericum sect. Concinna.

Hypericum concinnum is a small, perennial plant with bright yellow flowers. The flower has long petals which fold back from the bloom, with a spray of thin stamens and pistils. It is endemic to California.
