= Australian Drug Evaluation Committee =

The Australian Drug Evaluation Committee (ADEC) was a committee that provided independent scientific advice to the Australian Government regarding therapeutic drugs. The committee was originally formed in 1963 and more recently authorised under the Therapeutic Goods Act 1989 (Cth) as part of the Therapeutic Goods Administration (TGA). In 2010, ADEC was replaced by the Advisory Committee on Prescription Medicines (ACPM).

ADEC provided advice to the Minister for Health and Ageing and the Secretary of the Department of Health on:

- quality, risk-benefit, effectiveness and accessibility of drugs referred to ADEC for evaluation
- medical and scientific evaluations of applications for registration of new drugs

An important role of ADEC was the classification of drugs in Australia into pregnancy categories.

The two main subcommittees of ADEC which were responsible for specific aspects of drug regulation in Australia:

- the Adverse Drug Reactions Advisory Committee (ADRAC) (replaced in 2010 by the separate Advisory Committee on the Safety of Medicines, ACSOM);
- the Pharmaceutical Subcommittee – which made recommendations to ADEC on the pharmaceutical aspects (chemistry, quality control, pharmacokinetics, etc.) of drugs proposed for registration (replaced by the pharmaceutical subcommittee of the ACPM).

== See also ==
- International Conference on Harmonisation of Technical Requirements for Registration of Pharmaceuticals for Human Use (ICH)
- Food and Drug Administration (FDA, US)
- European Medicines Agency (EMEA, EU)
- Health Products and Food Branch
