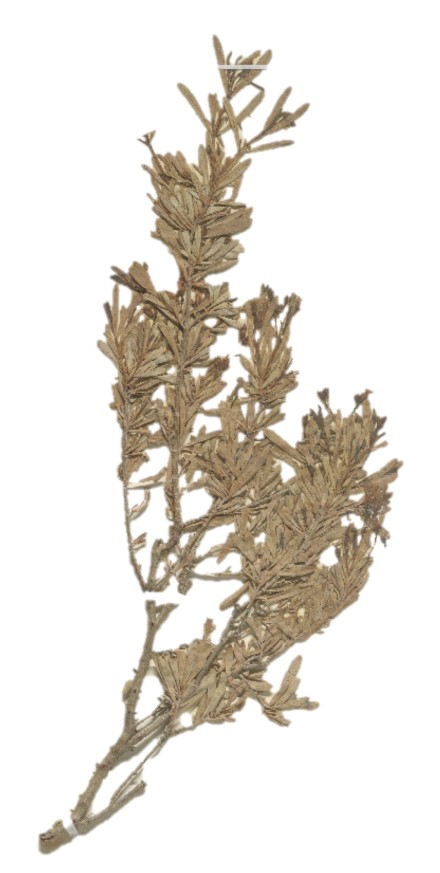

Scientific classification
- Kingdom: Plantae
- Clade: Tracheophytes
- Clade: Angiosperms
- Clade: Eudicots
- Clade: Rosids
- Order: Malpighiales
- Family: Hypericaceae
- Genus: Hypericum
- Section: Hypericum sect. Adenotrias
- Species: H. russeggeri

Binomial name
- Hypericum russeggeri (Fenzl) R.Keller

Synonyms
- Adenotrias kotschyi Jaub. & Spach; Adenotrias phrygia Jaub. & Spach; Elodes russegeri (Fenzl) Walp.; Hypericum empetrifolium Kotschy ex Jaub. & Spach; Triadenia russeggeri Fenzl

= Hypericum russeggeri =

Species of flowering plant

Hypericum russeggeri is a species of flowering plant in the St John's wort family Hypericaceae. The plant is a small shrub with many branches that spread across the ground, and it has many small flowers with pale yellow petals. It is found only among calcareous rocks along the coast and in the foothills of the Nur Mountains of eastern Turkey and northern Syria. While H. russeggeri has an array of phytochemicals present in its flowering structures and leaves, these are found in lower concentrations than other species of Hypericum. The species was first described in 1842 as Triadenia russeggeri, and it has been placed into various defunct genera including Elodea and Adenotrias. It is now known as Hypericum russeggeri and is the type species of Hypericum section Adenotrias, a small section that also includes H. aegypticum and H. aciferum.

== Etymology ==
The genus name Hypericum is possibly derived from the Greek words hyper (above) and eikon (picture), in reference to the tradition of hanging the plant over religious icons in the home. The specific epithet russeggeri is in honor of Austrian geologist Joseph Russegger who worked in Anatolia.

== Description ==
Hypericum russeggeri is a small shrub that has a great number of branches that twist and bend. These spread outwards and across the ground, and either ascend upwards at the end or lie entirely on the ground. The plant completely lacks hairs and dark glands. It has a chromosome number of n=10.

Hypericum russeggeri has many similarities to Hypericum aegypticum. It can be told apart from that species by the shape of its leaves, its deciduous petals and stamens, and that two ovules are found in its placentae. It is also related to H. aciferum, but that species has narrower leaves, fewer flowers, petals with less curling, and fewer stamens in each bundle.

=== Foliage ===
The stems of Hypericum russeggeri have four longitudinal lines and have a flattened cross-section when young, but become two-lined when mature. The length of stem between sets of leaves is usually shorter than the length of the leaf blade.

The leaves are directly connected to the stem, or have a very short petiole. They remain on the plant until its second season, then become deciduous. The leaf blades are 0.4–2.0 centimeters long by 0.15–0.3 cm wide, and are the shape of a narrow lance with the tip pointing towards the stem. Their top and bottom sides are the same color, and they have a blunt tip. The midrib vein is sometimes prominently visible from the bottom.

=== Flowering structures ===
The flower clusters usually have 3–7 flowers, but can have up to 9. The bracts appear the same as the normal foliage leaves, and the bracteoles are small and scale-shaped. The peduncle is 1–2 cm long and the pedicel is 0.15–0.25 cm long. The flowers themselves are about 1 cm wide, and are an oval shape when budding.

The sepals are green and overlap one another; they are of varying sizes and shapes. The petals are a quite pale yellow color, and are deciduous. Each petal is 0.6–0.9 cm long and 0.3–0.45 cm wide and they are a similar shape to the leaves. They curve outwards to create a corolla that is somewhat tubular. Each flower has around 30 stamens, the longest of which grow up to 0.5 cm. Inside the ovary is a placenta that has two ovules attached to it. The ovules hold a small seed capsule, with longitudinal valves. Inside the capsule are black-brown seeds about 0.2 cm in length.

In the protective layer of the tegmen in the seed, angular crystals of calcium oxalate are present. While the cells of the tegmen have slight undulations in their cell walls, they are much less pronounced than in other species like Hypericum confertum. This means that the cells appear almost rectangular when viewed.

=== Chemistry ===
The first assessment of the phytochemistry of Hypericum russeggeri was undertaken in 2016. Most of its phytochemicals are present in the flowering structures; these include hypericin, pseudohypericin, hyperforin, hyperoside, isoquercetin, quercitrin, avicularin, amentoflavone, and catechin. In the leaves, neochlorogenic and dihydroxybenzoic acid can be found. The concentrations of these chemicals is generally lower in Hypericum russeggeri than in the similar species H. hircinum, H. lanugisonum, and H. pallens. The only compounds present in H. russeggeri in greater concentrations than some of the similar species are neochlorogenic acid, hyperoside, quercitrin, and epicatechin.

== Taxonomy ==
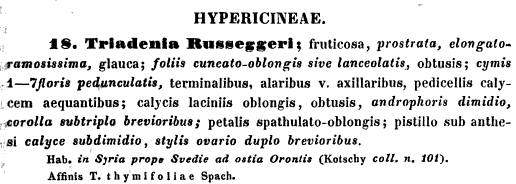
Original description of the species by Eduard Fenzl in 1842 under the synonym Triadenia russeggeri

Plants of the species were first collected in 1836 by botanists Theodor Kotschy and Ernest Coquebert de Montbret. While the collection locations for many of Kotschy's specimens are ambiguous, some of them state that they were found near Antioch; this agrees with Montbret's collections from the Hatay province of Turkey and from northwestern Syria, and establishes that region as its type locality.

In 1842, Eduard Fenzl used Kotschy's specimens to describe the new species as Triadenia russeggeri in the plant family "Hypericineae" (now Hypericaceae). He noted its very branchy and prostrate growth habit, its occurrence in Syria, and its similarity in appearance to Triadenia thymifolia (now Hypericum aegypticum subsp. webbii). Later that year, it was proposed that the species should be placed in the genus Elodea (which would give the new combination Elodea russeggeri). Also, new specimens from near the type locality were described as Adenotrias phrygia and A. kotschyi. These plants were later determined to be specimens of Hypericum russeggeri and the new names were synonymized.

The name Hypericum russeggeri was established by Robert Keller in Adolf Engler's textbook Die Natürlichen Pflanzenfamilien in 1893. The species was moved into Hypericum, and its previous placement in a separate genus was stated to be unwarranted, thus making it the type and only species (at that time) of Hypericum section Adenotrias. Norman Robson affirmed the new name and its designation as section type in the first volume of his monograph of the genus Hypericum in 1977, and the species has continued to be retained in Hypericum since then based on molecular phylogenetics.

== Distribution, habitat, and ecology ==
The Nur Mountains in Turkey, where Hypericum russeggeri can be found

Hypericum russeggeri is confined to a habitat of calcareous rocks, and it has been found at elevations of up to 100 meters above sea level. It is native to Hatay province in southeastern Turkey, and the northern coast of Syria. Within this distribution, it is found along the coast and in the foothills of the Nur Mountains. At one point, it may have been present near Edremit in western Anatolia, but it is now extinct in that region.

The species is parasitized by Cyphodema rubrica, a capsid bug. It lives as a vagrant on the leaves of the plant and can cause malformations.
