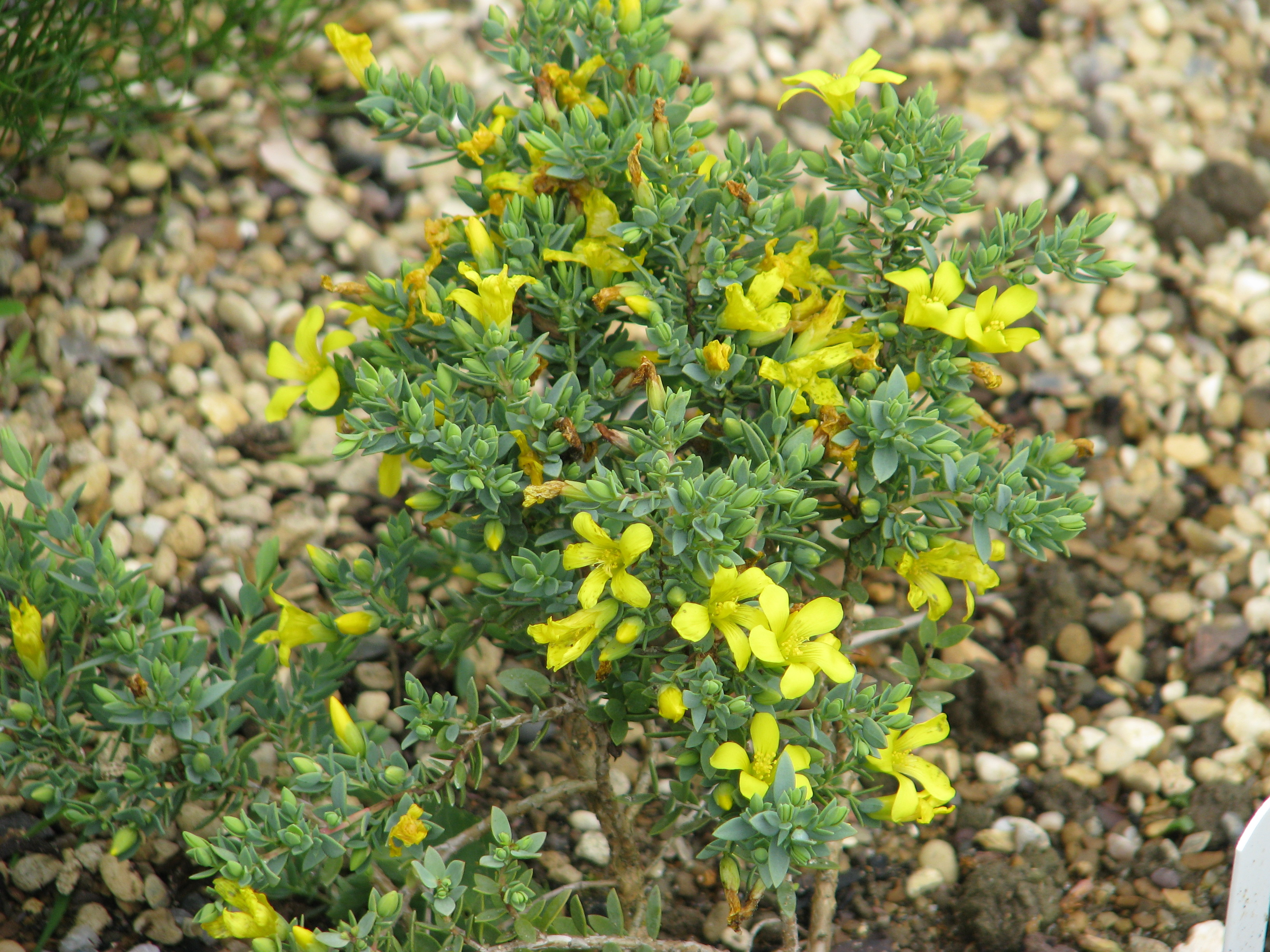
- Hypericum aegypticum, the most common species in the section

Scientific classification
- Kingdom: Plantae
- Clade: Tracheophytes
- Clade: Angiosperms
- Clade: Eudicots
- Clade: Rosids
- Order: Malpighiales
- Family: Hypericaceae
- Genus: Hypericum
- Section: Hypericum sect. Adenotrias (Jaub. & Spach) R. Keller

Type species
- Hypericum russeggeri (Fenzl) R. Keller

Species
- H. aciferum (Greuter) N. Robson; H. aegypticum L.; H. russeggeri (Fenzl) R. Keller

= Hypericum sect. Adenotrias =

Group of flowering plants

Adenotrias is a section of flowering plants in the family Hypericaceae. It is made up of Hypericum aciferum, H. aegypticum, and H. russeggeri (its type species). When it was first described, it was considered its own independent genus, but was later placed under Hypericum and demoted to a section. Its Latin name Adenotrias is made of the Greek prefix adeno- (referring to glands) and the Latin word trias (meaning three or a triad). Species in the section are shrubs up to 2 metres (6.6 ft) tall with smooth leaves and bark, and are the only species in Hypericum with heterostylous flowers. They are found around the Mediterranean coast, with H. aciferum restricted to the island of Crete and H. russeggeri present only in parts of Turkey and Syria. Plants of the section have a habitat among limestone and other calcareous rocks. While H. aegypticum has a wide and generally secure distribution, H. aciferum was evaluated as endangered several times since the 1980s, although it is now considered only vulnerable because it is protected in part by a plant micro-reserve near Agia Roumeli.

== Etymology ==
The genus name Hypericum is possibly derived from the Greek words hyper (above) and eikon (picture), in reference to the tradition of hanging the plant over religious icons in the home. The section name Adenotrias is made up of the Greek prefix adeno-, which refers to glands, and the Latin word trias (borrowed from the Greek triás), which refers to a group of three or a triad. The only species in the section with a common name is Hypericum aegypticum, called shrubby St John's wort (Note: Hypericum prolificum is also known as shrubby St John's wort.) or Egyptian St John's wort.

== Taxonomy ==
Throughout its history, the name Adenotrias has been applied to several different taxa by different authors. The name was first used by French botanist Édouard Spach in 1842 to establish a new genus, separate from the large taxon Hypericum. Spach formed this genus around three species: Adenotrias phrygia and Adenotrias kotschyi (both later determined to be synonyms of Hypericum russeggeri), and Adenotrias aegypticum (moved from Triadenia and today accepted as Hypericum aegypticum).

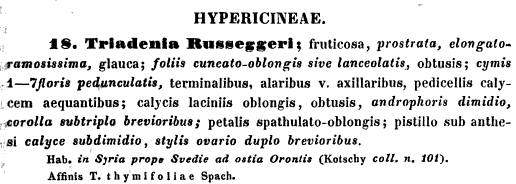
Original description of Hypericum russeggeri in 1842 under the synonym Triadenia russeggeri

In Adolf Engler's textbook Die Natürlichen Pflanzenfamilien in 1893, Robert Keller moved a species previously known as Triadenia russeggeri or Elodes russeggeri into Hypericum, making the new combination Hypericum russeggeri. Keller also created a new taxon, called Hypericum section Adenotrias, to hold the species, establishing the modern conception of Adenotrias as a section within Hypericum. Later, in 1893, Keller addressed the already existing genus Adenotrias as created by Spach, synonymizing A. phrygia and A. kotschyi with H. russeggeri and merging A. aegypticum into the section as Hypericum aegypticum.

In 1965, Werner Greuter described a new species in the journal Candollea. He placed it in the genus Elodes, which had also been split from Hypericum in the 19th century, creating the name Elodes acifera. He noted its close relation to a species he called Elodes russeggeri (a synonym of Hypericum russeggeri), and thus created a new section within Elodes which he called Elodes section Adenotrias. However, this situation was short-lived, as British taxonomist Norman Robson described the species again in 1967 in the journal Feddes Repertorium, moving it into the genus Hypericum under its currently accepted name Hypericum aciferum. This synonymized Elodes sect. Adenotrias with Hypericum sect. Adenotrias, a placement Greuter corroborated in 1973.

Norman Robson subsequently began work on a monograph of the genus Hypericum, which discussed sect. Adenotrias several times. In the first volume, published in 1977, Robson designated Hypericum russeggeri as the type species of the section. In the sixth volume of the work, published in 1996, Robson incorporated Adenotrias into his framework of 36 sections within the genus. He affirmed that it was made up of H. aciferum, H. aegypticum, and H. russeggeri—three species of shrubs found among limestone rocks which vary greatly in appearance. Several studies of the molecular phylogenetics of the section have confirmed this composition, as well as its species' close relationship to one another.

== Description ==
Species in Adenotrias are shrubs and shrublets that can grow upright or spread out along the ground. They are up to 2 metres (6.6 ft) tall, have smooth leaves, and lack dark glands. The plants' stems have two or four lateral lines along their length, and have light glands. The bark is smooth, and ranges in color from grey-brown to pale grey. Their leaves are placed on opposite sides of the stem, and lack leaf stalks. The shape of the leaf blade is relatively similar across species and plants. The edges of the blade are smooth, with pinnate main veins and no visible net of smaller veins. On the surface of the leaf, there are point-shaped glands; however, these are only present on the upperside of the blade.

The flowers range in shape from tubular to salverform and have five sepals and five petals. Hypericum sect. Adenotrias is the only section in Hypericum that exhibits heterostyly, in which individual plants can have two different types of flowers. On plants of the section, there are two separate flower morphologies: one has long styles and short stamens (such specimens are called "pins"), while the other has short styles and long stamens (such specimens are called "thrums").

Species of H. sect. Adenotrias

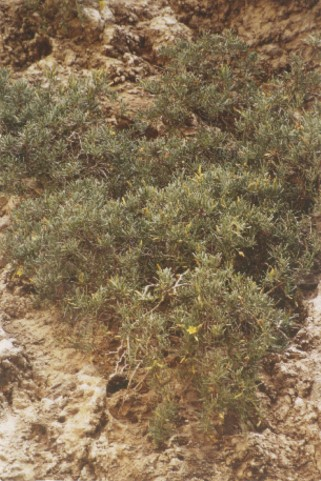
H. aciferum

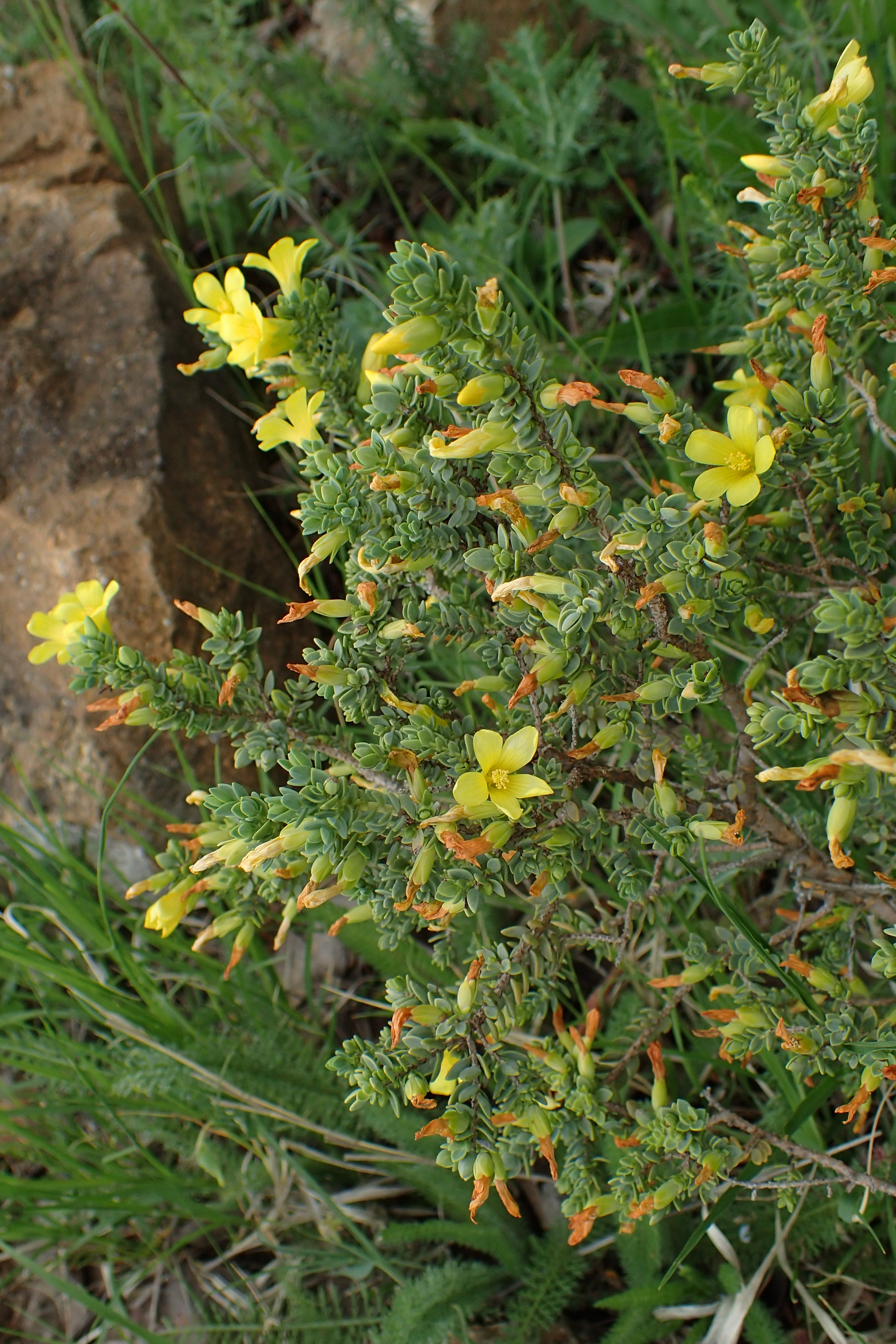
H. aegypticum

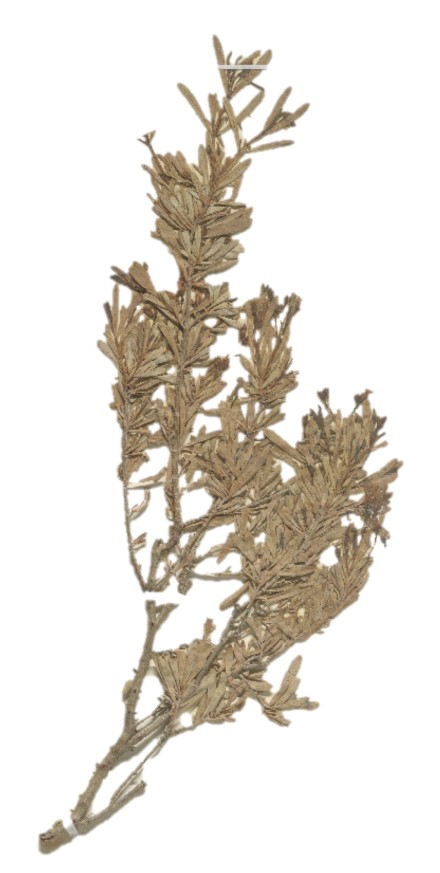
H. russeggeri

=== Chemistry ===
Hypericum russeggeri has lower concentrations of active phytochemicals like hypericin, pseudohypericin, hyperforin, and hyperoside than related species such as H. hircinum. The phytochemistry of Hypericum aegypticum can vary widely, with plants across its distribution having different major essential oil components. Only spathulenol, caryophyllene oxide, and E-caryophellene are universal within the species. Plants of the species that vary in appearance are also likely to differ in their phytochemical profile. Some of these essential oils were shown to have in vitro antimicrobial effects against certain Gram-positive bacteria.

== Distribution, habitat, and ecology ==
Hypericum russeggeri is found in southeast Turkey and northern Syria. Hypericum aciferum is endemic to Crete, and is found only in Sfakia and Selino. Hypericum aegypticum is distributed more widely, and is indigenous to Malta, Greece, Morocco, Algeria, and Libya. However, its distribution is fragmented into several distinct populations, rather than being continuous throughout that range.

All three species in the section are chasmophytic, and can grow in the crevices of rocks. H. aciferum and H. aegypticum are found among limestone, while H. russeggeri has a habitat of other calcareous rocks.

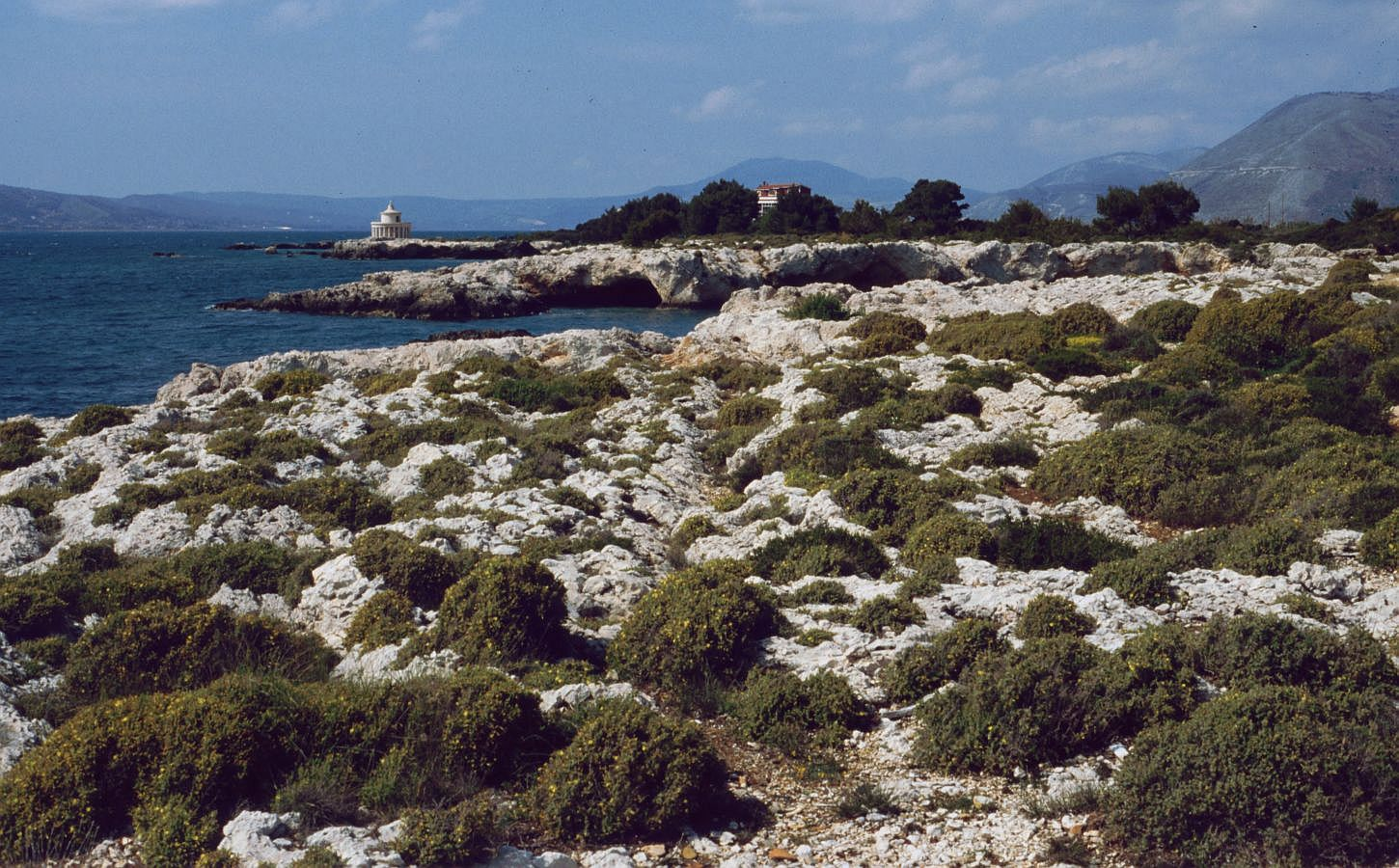
Hypericum aegypticum among limestone rocks

H. russeggeri is parasitized by Cyphodema rubrica, a capsid bug. H. aciferum grows among many other flowering plants, (Note: These include Allium bourgeaui, Centaurea argentea, Dianthus fruticosus, Origanum dictamnus, Ornithogalum creticum, and Staehelina fruticosa.) and in Pinus halepensis forest. It has been seen spreading via myrmecochory; ants help to disperse its seeds by carrying them from one place to another.

== Conservation and cultivation ==
Location of the Hypericum aciferum PMR

Hypericum aciferum was evaluated as an endangered species several times in the 1980s and 1990s, and was listed as a "strictly protected flora species" by the European Environment Agency. Since 2015, the species has been protected in a plant micro-reserve (PMR) of around 6.5 hectares located near Agia Roumeli on the island of Crete. However, because of critically low numbers of surviving plants, there is still a high risk of extinction from threats like human activity, fire, and habitat erosion. In spite of these threats, the IUCN re-evaluated the species in 2021, assessing it as vulnerable and as having a stable population.

Hypericum aegypticum has a wide distribution, but was identified by the Maltese Red Data Book as having a threatened status on Malta; however, no legal action had been taken for the protection of the species as of 2021.

Hypericum aciferum has extremely low suitability for use as a garden plant. While Hypericum aegypticum is not widely cultivated, it is present in botanical gardens, including in a greenhouse at the University of Oxford Botanic Garden.
