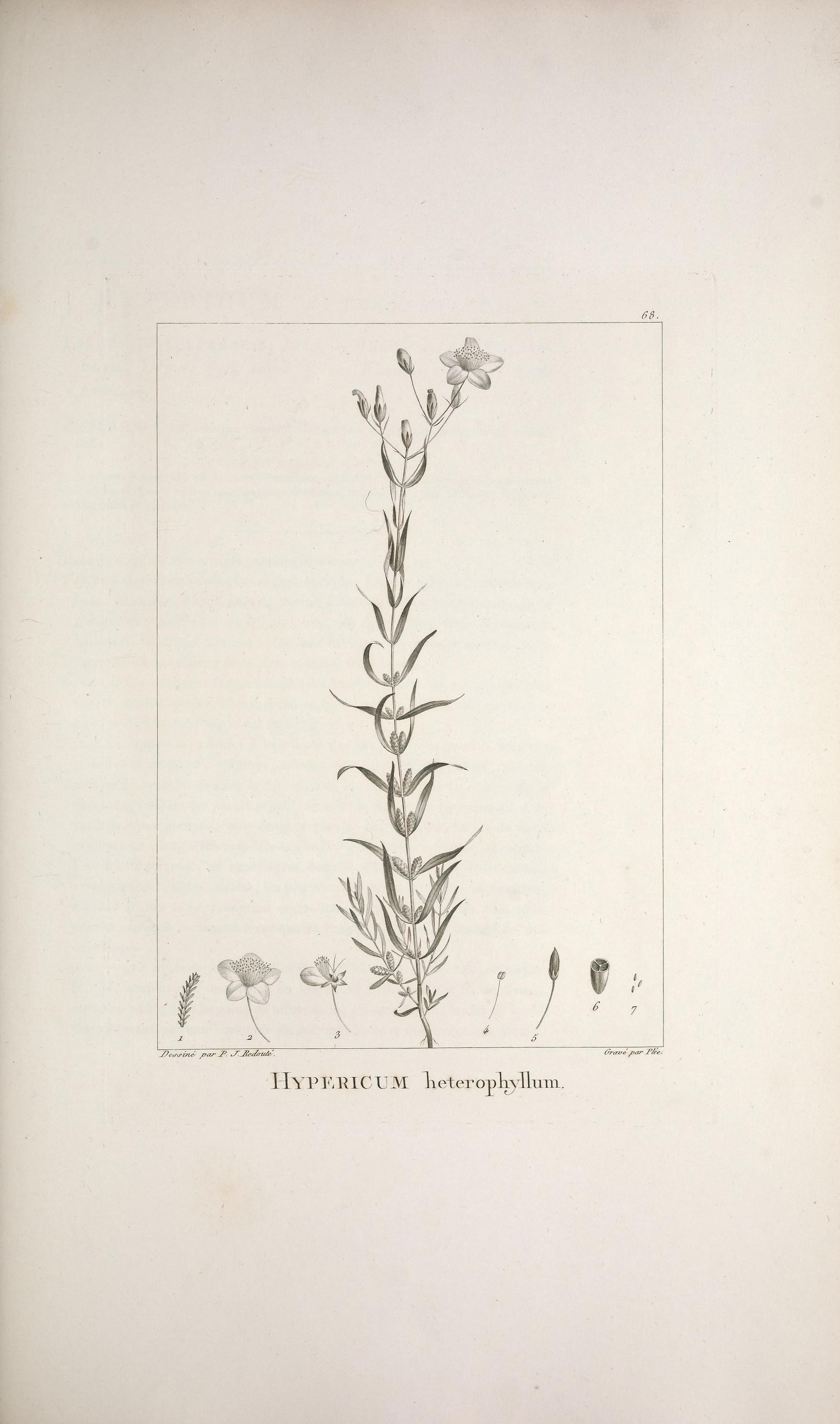

Scientific classification
- Kingdom: Plantae
- Clade: Tracheophytes
- Clade: Angiosperms
- Clade: Eudicots
- Clade: Rosids
- Order: Malpighiales
- Family: Hypericaceae
- Genus: Hypericum
- Section: Hypericum sect. Heterophylla
- Species: H. heterophyllum

Binomial name
- Hypericum heterophyllum Vent.

= Hypericum heterophyllum =

Species of flowering plant in the St John's wort family

Hypericum heterophyllum is a flowering plant in the Hypericaceae family and is the only species in Hypericum sect. Heterophylla.

== Distribution and habitat ==
H. heterophyllum is endemic to Turkey, being found in the north-west and west-central regions of Anatolia. It is found in dry clearings of Pinus nigra forests and in garrigue among Cistus laurifolius at elevations of 1,200–1,500 metres (3,900–4,900 ft).

== Taxonomy ==
The specific epithet "heterophyllum" indicates the differing forms of the species' leaves on different parts of the stem. The species is related to H. aegypticum but is systematically isolated within the genus. It lacks the specializations of sect. Adenotrias, and has a chromosome number of 2n=18 as opposed to H. aegypticum's 2n=20.

== Description ==
H. heterophyllum is a shrublet that usually grows between 0.1–0.2 metres (3.9–7.9 in) tall. It is many branched and forms a generally flattish-topped bush, with the lower branches having a more woody composition and being branched in a falsely dichotomous arrangement. The cortex of these woody branches is green, and the bark is smooth with a reddish brown or greyish brown color. All of the branches can range form eirect and straight to decumbent and twisted; they completely lack hairs and are without dark glands. The stems are 2-lined and have short internodes and small scaly leaves at first, but later they can become terete and have elongated internodes. Once the stems bear flowers, they become obscurely glandular and begin to wither, leaving the over-wintering base part bearing pairs of strobiliform condensed shoots.

The leaves are free but sessile, and have different morphological characteristics based on where they are located on the plant. The leaves on the lower part of the plant are perennating, while the leaves on the upper part of the plant are deciduous. The perrenating scale-leaves are 0.5–1.5 mm (0.020–0.059 in) long; they are either shaped like broad ovals or disks in a manner resembling a hood. They can have short, sharply pointed tips or can lack pointed tips. All of the leaves elongate in the spring into a spathulate shape and the upper sides take on a dull grayish-green color. The foliage leaves measure 5–15 mm (0.20–0.59 in) by 1–2 mm (0.039–0.079 in) and can be elliptic-oblong and narrow or linear. They have a leathery texture and acute apexes, with a plane margin and wedge-shaped base.

The inflorescence is 3–5 flowered, with cymules of flowers on the lower nodes of the stem, and the plant can have up to 13 flowers in total. The inflorescence is shaped into a rounded pyramid; its bracteoles are a triangular lance shape or linear; the pedicels are very short or absent altogether. The flowers themselves are 8 mm (0.31 in)–12 mm (0.47 in) in diameter with oval shaped buds which are subacute. The sepals are green and measure 2–3.5 mm (0.079–0.138 in) by 0.8–1.2 mm (0.031–0.047 in). They overlap each other and are unequal, with an oblong shape. There are typically five veins, with only the midrib prominent if any at all. The petals are bright yellow without any tinge of red. They number between 2.2 and 2.5 times as many as the sepals and are obtuse to rounded with a small point and linear laminar glands. The flowers have between 35 and 45 stamens which range from 4.5–7 mm (0.18–0.28 in) in length. The ovaries are 1.5 mm (0.059 in) by 0.7 mm (0.028 in), with a cylindrical oval shape and truncate end. Their styles are widely spreading and measure 4 mm (0.16 in) long and number approximately 2.4 times the number of ovaries. The seed capsule is shaped like a narrow cylinder, is longer than the sepals, and is surrounded by old petals. There are two seeds on each placenta which are not seen mature, and their testa have small pits along their surface.

== Biochemistry ==
Most species in the genus Hypericum contain significant amounts of the substances Hypericin or Pseudohypericin, or both. Unusually, however, H. heterophyllum contains neither of the two substances.

=== Antifungal properties ===
Under laboratory conditions, H. heterophyllum displays moderate antifungal properties against several species of fungus in the genera Fusarium and Rhizoctonia due to a combination of several of the components of its essential oil. However, the effects of the H. heterophyllum extract were not as potent as that of the commercial antifungal benomyl, so it is unlikely to have much practical use as an antifungal.
