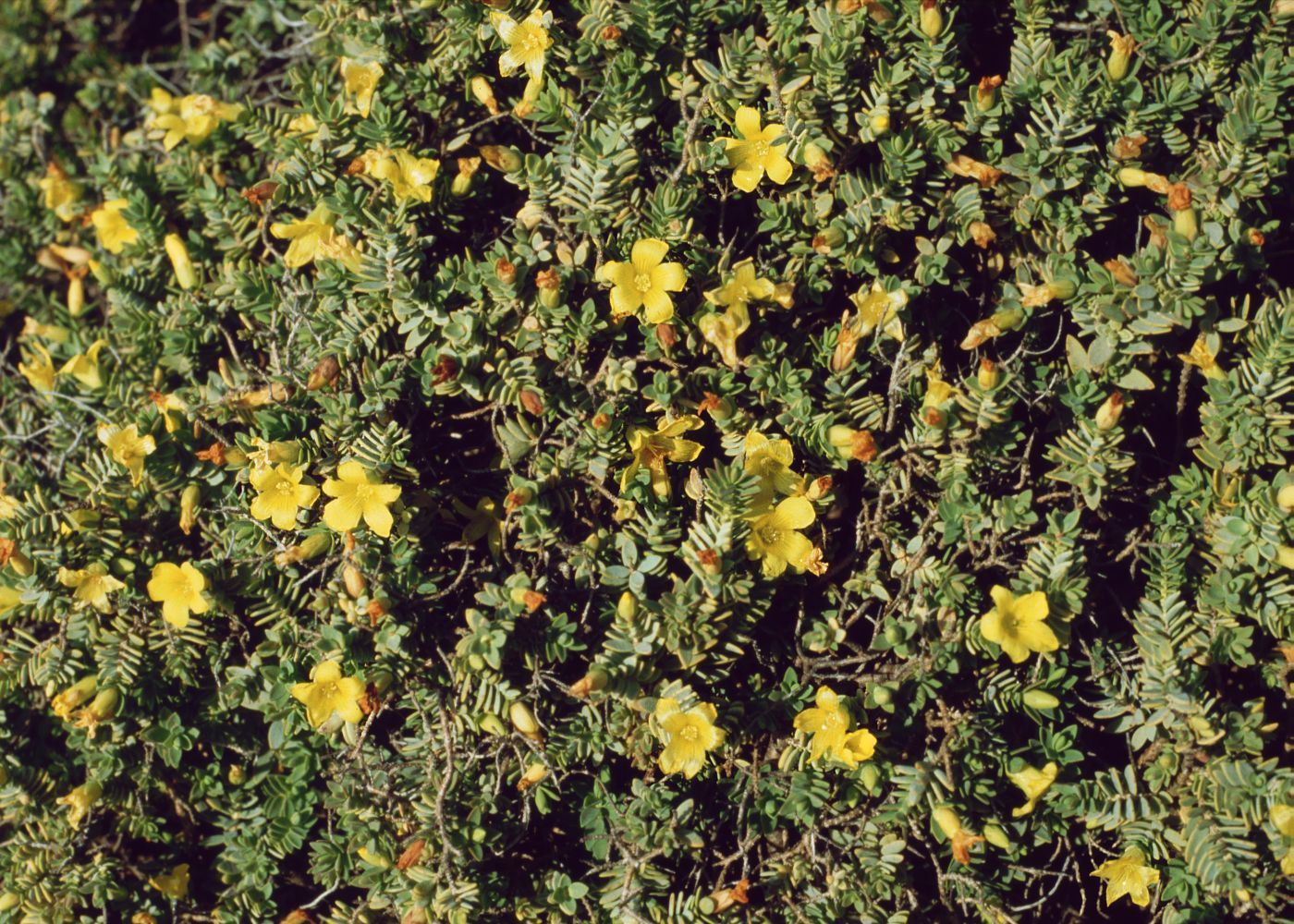

Scientific classification
- Kingdom: Plantae
- Clade: Tracheophytes
- Clade: Angiosperms
- Clade: Eudicots
- Clade: Rosids
- Order: Malpighiales
- Family: Hypericaceae
- Genus: Hypericum
- Section: Hypericum sect. Adenotrias
- Species: H. aegypticum

Binomial name
- Hypericum aegypticum L.

Subspecies
- H. aegypticum subsp. aegypticum; H. aegypticum subsp. maroccanum (Pau) N.Robson; H. aegypticum subsp. webii (Spach) N. Robson

Synonyms
- Hypericum webbii Nyman; Hypericum creticum hort. ex Link; Hypericum heterostylum Parl.; Triadenia aegyptica (L.) Boiss.; Triadenia microphylla Spach; Elodea aegyptica (L.) Jack; Elodes aegyptica (L.) Y.Kimura; Episiphis parvifolia Raf.; Martia polyandra Spreng.

= Hypericum aegypticum =

Species of flowering plant in the St John's wort family

Hypericum aegypticum is a species of flowering plant of the St. John's wort family (Hypericaceae) which is native to the Eastern Mediterranean. It was described by Carl Linnaeus in the second volume of his Species Plantarum in 1753, who named it after Egypt despite it not being distributed there. The plant is commonly known as shrubby St. John's wort or Egyptian St. John's wort in English. Like other members of section Adenotrias, it is found among limestone rocks in coastal areas. While it has been evaluated as threatened on the island of Malta, the species has no legal protections.

The species is a shrub or shrublet that grows up to 2 meters (6.6 feet) tall with many branches, each having a single small flower with five yellow petals and many stamens. Its leaves lack hairs, and have densely patterned glands and large primary veins. The species is notable for its heterostyly, a trait which within the Hypericum genus is unique to section Adenotrias, and exhibits one of two heterostylous flower types called "pins" and "thrums". It has three subspecies, which vary in their distribution and phytochemical makeup.

== Description ==
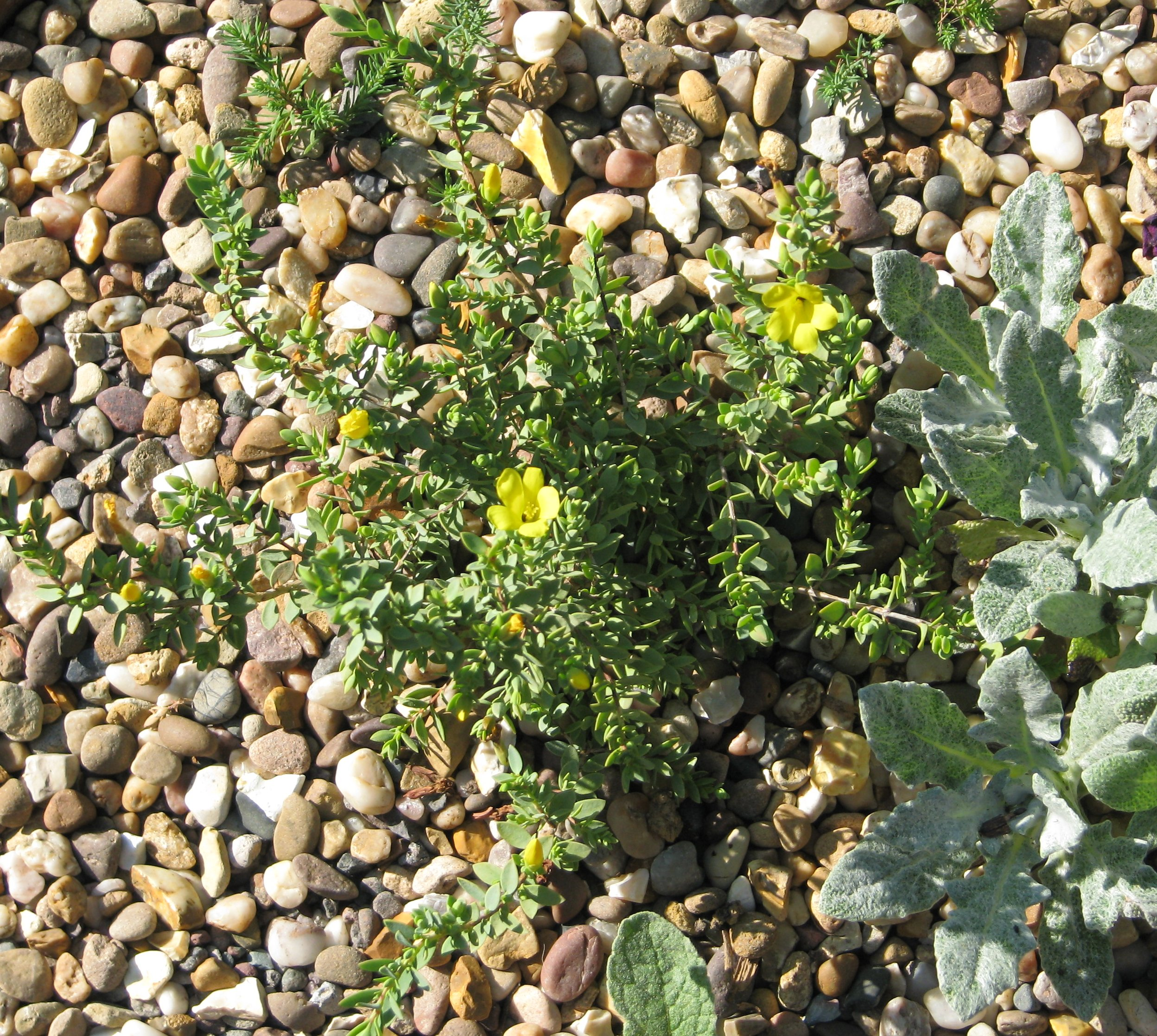
Hypericum aegypticum can have a busy or spreading growth pattern.

Hypericum aegypticum is a shrub or shrublet that varies in height from 0.05 to 2 meters (0.16 to 6.56 ft) tall. It grows in a crowded, spreading pattern, with its stems stretching out from the center of the plant. The branches grow roughly perpendicular from these stems, but can also spread out in different directions. It has a chromosome number of 2n=20.

=== Stems ===
The stems of Hypericum aegypticum usually have two visible lines running along their length, but can sometimes have four. When the plant is young, the stems are a flatter shape with two edges (ancipitous), but quickly become more cylindrical as the plant matures. In a cross-section, the profile of the stems is circular and lacks wing-like extensions. They have a vessel density of roughly two vessels per square millimeter of stem, with each of these vessels measuring 15 micrometers in diameter. In between the nodes where the leaves branch from (in the internodes), there are small leaf-like structures which are shorter than the true leaves.

The xylem in the stems, a type of transport tissue, differs from other similar species of Hypericum. The xylem of H. aegypticum is diffuse; it is spread evenly throughout the stem. In other similar species, the xylem is ring-porous and more dense in a series of concentric rings. There are two secretory structures in the stems: small secretory canals in the phloem and many large secretory canals in the cortex.

=== Leaves ===
The leaves of Hypericum aegypticum are free and range from sessile to shortly petiolate. They persist for around two seasons. The blades are 3–18 millimeters (0.1–0.7 inches) long and 1–5 millimeters (0.04–0.20 inches) wide. Their shape is elliptic or narrowly oblong. The leaves are the same color as the rest of the plant and have a texture similar to that of leather. The shape of their tip can range from acute to obtuse and the base of the leaf is wedge-shaped. The leaves lack hairs (trichomes) on both the top and bottom.

They have one pair of lateral veins, with the midrib sometimes branched and visible beneath them. Their primary veins are very large and straight and are highly rigid. The secondary veins branch off at acute angles of wide divergence, and some tertiary veins with a branched pattern are also present.

The laminar and marginal glands are dense. Unlike some species of Hypericum, such as H. perforatum, H. aegypticum lacks black nodules on its leaves. Instead, it has small translucent glands which measure 54 by 45 micrometers and are found in the mesophyll.

The upper sides of the leaves have an outer layer (epidermis) made of cells with linear walls and rounded corners. This upper side also has stomata that are surrounded by smaller cells. The lower side of the leaves have a similar composition to the upper side, but with a higher density of stomata. On both sides, there is a cuticle that extends over the entire surface, even over the guard cells, which makes them very hard to distinguish. This thick cuticle leads to increased impermeability in areas where there are encrusted deposits.

=== Inflorescence ===
Hypericum aegypticum is one-flowered, and its inflorescence is terminal and grows from around four axils below. It has short flowering branches past a "sterile" region which lacks them. These branches grow from around eleven different nodes. However, some plants lack the sterile region and can have flowers or flowering branches from up to twenty-two nodes. The inflorescence is similar in appearance to a spike, with longer branches below the flowering region. The bracts are often absent, but when they are present they are leaf-like in appearance, with a clasping calyx and several types of glands. The pedicels are very short or absent altogether.

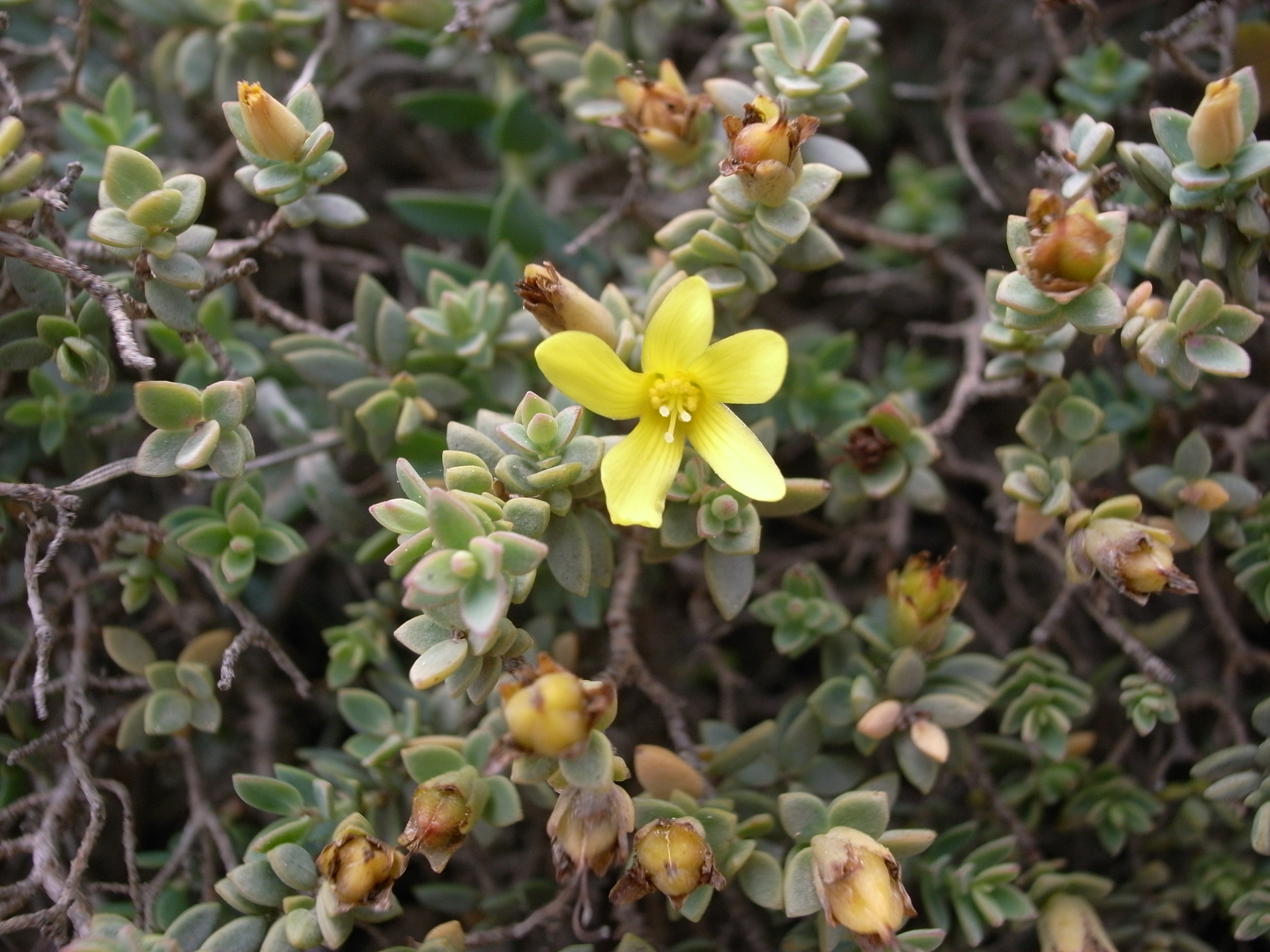
The petals of Hypericum aegypticum can be pale or bright yellow and have five petals

The flowers of H. aegypticum range from 5–10 millimeters (0.20–0.39 inches) in diameter. The shape of the buds is a narrow form between an oval and an ellipse which tapers to a rounded point. The sepals are green and are 3.5–5.5 millimeters (0.14–0.22 inches) by 1–2 millimeters (0.04–0.08 inches) in size. They overlap one another and are not quite the same size. Their shape ranges from oblong to elliptic, but they can also be lance-like in form. Their ends can be rounded, pointed, or obtuse. The sepals are hood-like and stand stiffly erect, and have roughly nine unbranched veins with prominent midribs and linear laminar glands. The petals of the flower range from bright yellow to a rather pale shade of yellow. They are 6.5–12 millimeters (0.26–0.47 inches) by 2–3 millimeters (0.08–0.12 inches) in size. They are persistent in fruit and there are roughly twice as many of them as there are sepals.

There are 18–48 stamens per inflorescence, with single fascicles containing 5–10 stamens and double fascicles containing 5–29 stamens. There are united filaments in each fascicle, the longest of which are 6.5 millimeters (0.26 in) in long-styled individuals and 9 millimeters (0.35 in) in short-styled individuals. Some stamen fascicles are sterile and are 0.6–0.7 millimeters (0.02–0.03 inches) long and flat-topped. The ovaries are 0.5–4 millimeters (0.02–0.16 inches) by 0.5–1 millimeter (0.02–0.04 inches) in size and are narrow or very narrow and acute to truncate.

The seed capsule is 5–7 millimeters (0.20–0.28 inches) by 3–3.5 millimeters (0.12–0.14 inches) in size. Its shape is that of a cylindric ellipsoid to a rather broad ellipsoid. It is longer than the sepals, and its valves run longitudinally and have oil tubes. The seeds are dark brown and roughly 1.5 millimeters (0.06 inches) long and lack a longitudinal ridge. The testa have small linear pits or wrinkles, and the elaiosome is often lobed.

==== Heterostyly ====
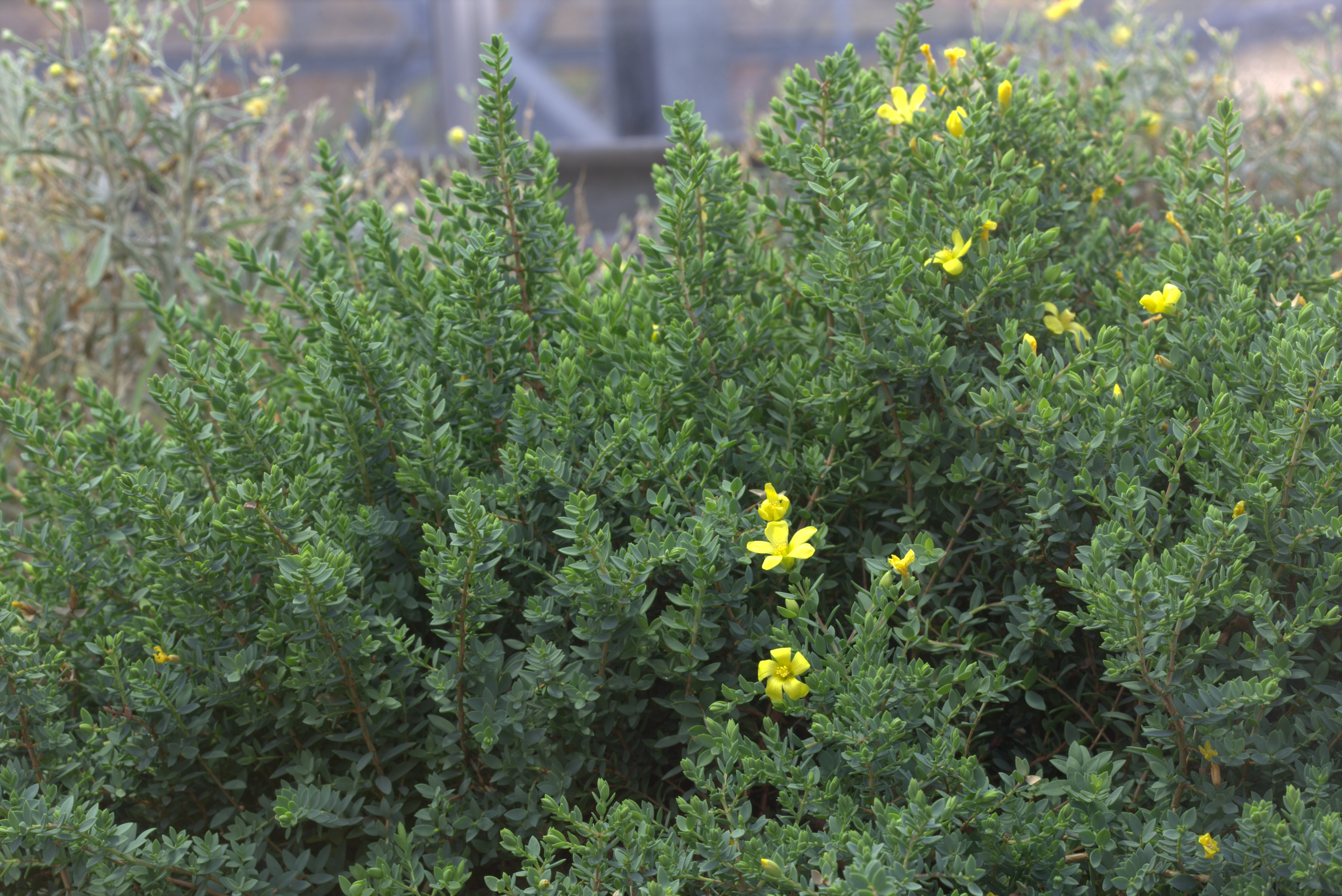
Hypericum aegypticum in the Gothenburg Botanical Garden

Individual plants of Hypericum aegypticum exhibit one of two different sets of characteristics, called distyly. This polymorphism is characterized by two different types of flowers: one has long styles and short stamens (such specimens are called "pins"), the other has short styles and long stamens (such specimens are called "thrums"). In this species, pin flowers produce and receive more pollen grains than thrum flowers. This is unusual, as it does not fit with the expected course of natural selection; plants in the species which produce and receive more pollen would be expected to outcompete those that produce and receive less. While pin flowers are more common in the wild with a ratio of approximately 3 pins to 1 thrum, that difference is only because the gene which codes for the pin is dominant while the thrum is recessive, and the 3:1 ratio is consistent with traits that have no effect on reproduction.

Hypericum sect. Adenotrias is the only section in Hypericum that exhibits heterostyly, and all of its species, including Hypericum aegypticum, are distylous. This trait is thought to have evolved within the genus as opposed to being primitive and is one of the unique characteristics of sect. Adenotrias. In studies of eleven angiosperm genera which exhibited distyly, all but Hypericum followed a genetic system called the Primula system, in which the "thrum" form was dominant and the "pin" form was recessive. However, for an unknown reason, the opposite appears to be the case for the species of Hypericum.

=== Phytochemistry ===
The phytochemistry of Hypericum aegypticum varies a great deal depending on which subspecies is analyzed. Subspecies aegypticum, maroccanum, and webii are all highly different in their major essential oil components, with only three constituents being found in common in all of the subspecies: spathulenol, caryophyllene oxide, and E-caryophellene. The major constituent of subsp. aegypticum is ishwarane (a sesquiterpene) the major constituent of subsp. maroccanum is caryophyllene, and the major constituent of subsp. webii is pinene. These differences in the compounds detected in the species reveal that morphologically different populations of H. aegypticum are also likely to differ phytochemically. Small amounts of other metabolites are also present in H. aegypticum, including flavonoids (3.95 g/kg), biflavones (1.45 g/kg), acylphloroglucinols (1.15 g/kg), cinnamic acids (0.35 g/kg), and naphtodianthrones (0.05 g/kg).

Essential oil extracts from Hypericum aegypticum subsp. webbii were shown in vitro to have moderate antimicrobial effects against Gram-positive bacteria such as Bacillus subtilis, Enterococcus faecalis, Staphylococcus epidermidis, and Micrococcus luteus.

== Distribution and habitat ==
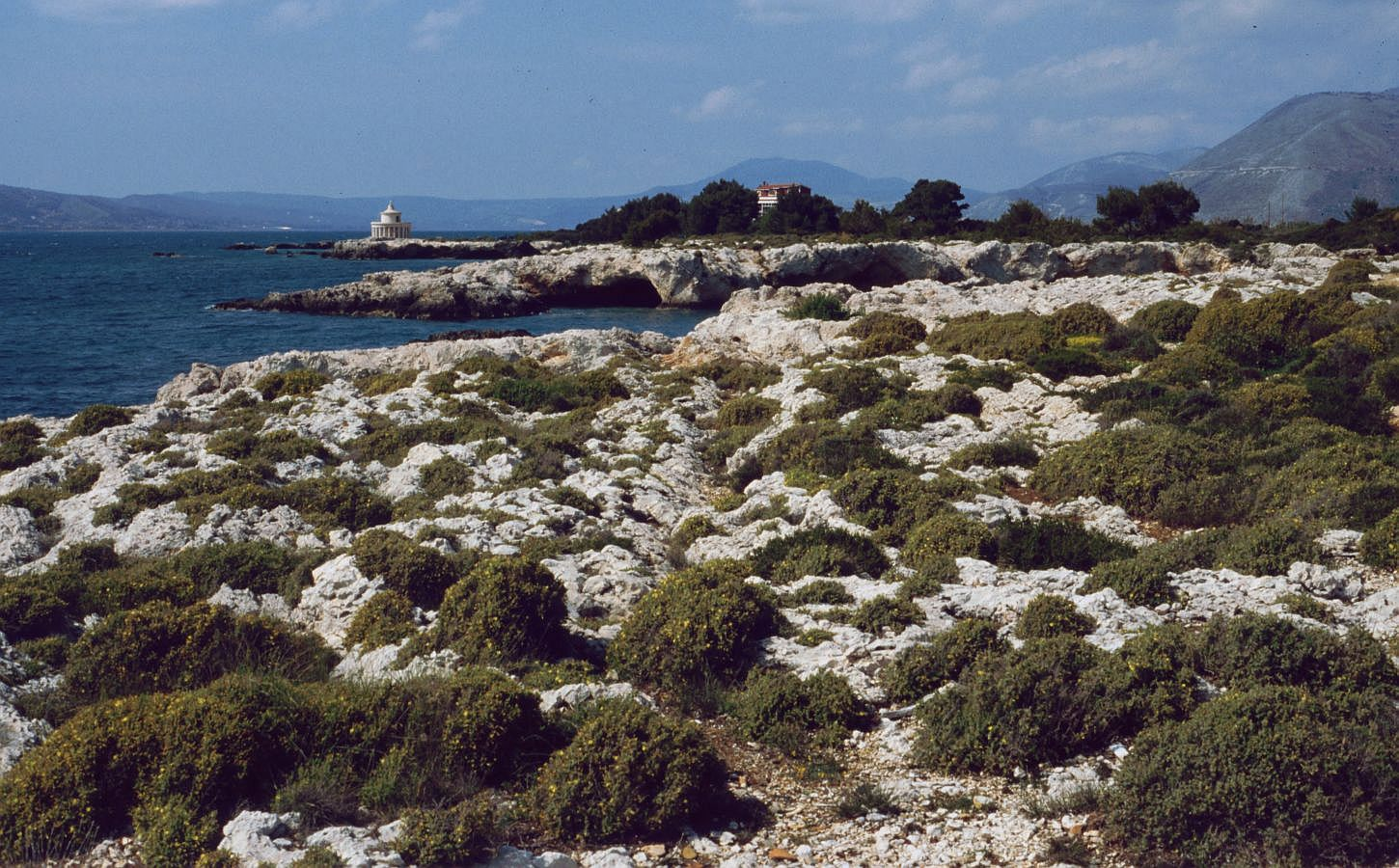
Hypericum aegypticum among limestone rocks

Hypericum aegypticum can be found frequently in the wild and is indigenous to Malta, Greece, Morocco, Algeria, and Libya. However, its distribution across these countries is unusual because it is highly fragmented into several different population strands. The three subspecies are divided among these strands: H. aegypticum subsp. aegypticum is native to Libya; subsp. maroccanum is native to Morocco and Algeria; subsp. webbii is native to Sardinia, Sicily, Malta, and Greece.

H. aegypticum is found among limestone rocks and scree in valleys of coastal areas. It is found at elevations from sea level to 1,600 meters (5,200 feet) above sea level. In some habitats, particularly more wind-swept or exposed areas, the species has been observed in much denser, carpet-like growth patterns, sometimes growing to only 20–30 centimetres (8–12 in) tall. However, the species grows best in open, sunny areas free of other plants which could compete with it.

While H. aegypticum has been identified by the Maltese Red Data Book as having a threatened status on Malta, no legal action has been taken for the protection of the species as of 2021.

=== Cultivation ===
While Hypericum aegypticum is not widely cultivated, it is present in botanical gardens, including in a greenhouse at the University of Oxford Botanic Garden.

== Taxonomy ==
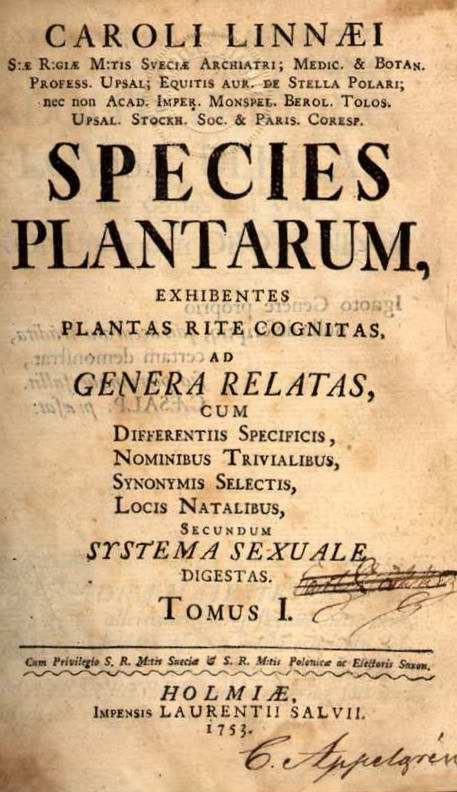
Hypericum aegypticum was first described in Species plantarum.

Hypericum aegypticum was first described by Carl Linnaeus in his second volume of Species Plantarum in 1753. He noted the species' Egyptian habitat, its often paired leaves, growing pattern, and the shape of its leaves. However, even though Linnaeus mentioned "Aegypto" and claimed that his type specimen for the species was from Egypt, H. aegypticum is not actually native to Egypt, and the specimen Linnaeus used most likely came from one of the Libyan populations. Today, H. aegypticum is commonly referred to in English as Shrubby St. John's Wort or Egyptian St. John's Wort, while in Malta it is known as Fexfiex tal-irdum.

The species' placement within Hypericum can be summarized as follows:

Hypericum

Hypericum subg. Hypericum

Hypericum sect. Adenotrias

Hypericum russeggeri
Hypericum aciferum
Hypericum aegypticum

=== History ===
After the original description by Linnaeus, various botanists identified the plant under different names which are now considered invalid synonyms of the species. Michel Adanson, in his 1763 work establishing the genus Elodes, erroneously described the species Hypericum elodes by relying upon a supposed description by Linnaeus of the species in his 1753 Species Plantarum. However, the name H. elodes did not appear in the 1762 Flora Anglica, and the name that Adanson actually referenced was Hypericum aegypticum. Therefore, his description under the erroneous name H. elodes is considered to be a synonym of H. aegypticum. Confusion around Elodes continued, but it was eventually restricted to the singular species H. elodes as originally defined by Linnaeus. In the early 19th century, the species of Hypericum were being divided into numerous smaller, new genera by different authors. Antoine Laurent de Jussieu split it into five genera, confusingly including one called Elodea. Édouard Spach contributed his own restrictive genera and placed H. aegypticum first into Triadenia and then Adenotrias. Robert Keller later reduced all of these new genera to sections within Hypericum in 1925, bringing H. aegypticum back into Hypericum within section Adenotrias.

In 1996, British taxonomist Norman Robson published the sixth volume of his comprehensive monograph on the genus Hypericum. In this volume, Robson recognized Linnaeus' original name as correct and maintained H. aegypticum in sect. Adenotrias, incorporating it into his new framework of 36 sections. Adenotrias was established to comprise three species of shrubs found among limestone rocks which vary greatly in appearance. However, the species of the section were united because they shared the trait of heterostyly.

=== Phylogeny ===
Molecular phylogenetics has demonstrated that Hypericum aegypticum is most closely related to H. balfourii and H. socotranum of sect. Campylosporus. However, no conclusive evidence was found which would suggest that these similarities would warrant the inclusion of H. aegypticum in sect. Campylosporus. Phylogenetic studies have also found that H. heterophyllum, despite lacking the floral specializations and heterostyly of H. aegypticum, has similar characteristics to the species, especially H. aegypticum subsp. maroccanum. This suggests that H. heterophyllum is a derivative of the species which has lost some of the specializations that are unique to H. aegypticum and sect. Adenotrias.

=== Subdivision ===
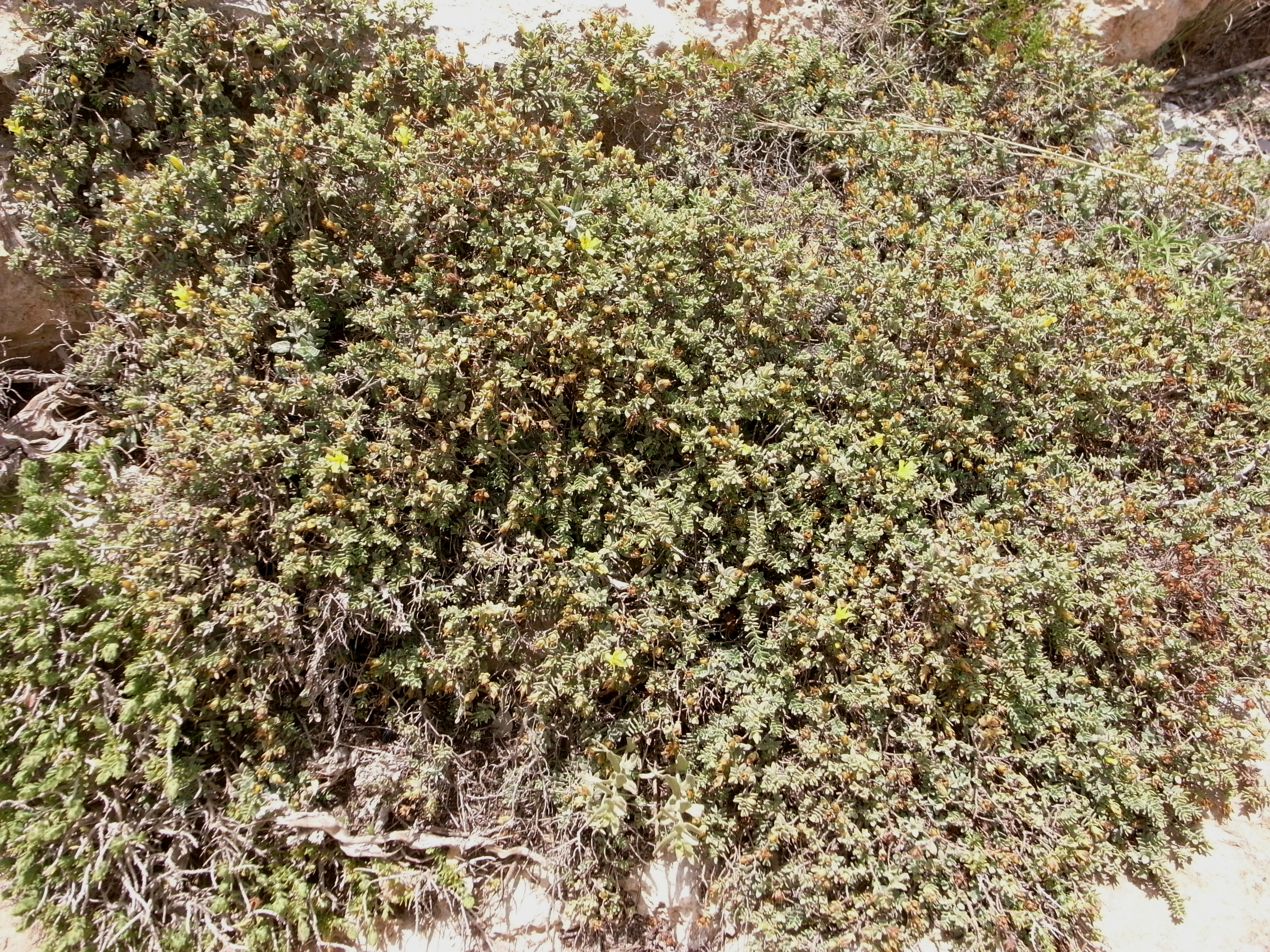
Hypericum aegypticum subsp. webbii

The following subspecies are accepted by Plants of the World Online:

- Hypericum aegypticum subsp. aegypticum
- Hypericum aegypticum subsp. maroccanum (Pau) N. Robson
- Hypericum aegypticum subsp. webbii (Spach) N. Robson

Beyond their separate distributions, the subspecies also vary slightly in appearance. Subsp. maroccanum grows more upright than its counterparts, subsp. webbii is typically taller and larger, and subsp. aegypticum has petals that are somewhat shorter. Additionally, the branches of maroccanum tend to reach upwards, while aegypticum usually forms a lower bush. Lastly, the leaves of maroccanum are markedly larger than aegypticum or webbii.

Subspecies maroccanum was originally described as a variety of H. aegypticum by Carlos Pau in 1932, while subsp. webbii was originally considered to be its own species under the name Triadenia webbii by Édouard Spach in 1836. Norman Robson reclassified both as subspecies of H. aegypticum in 1993, and established subsp. aegypticum to denote any specimens which were separate from both maroccanum and webbii.
