= Allium schoenoprasoides =

Лук скородовидный 类北薤 lei bei xie

Scientific classification
- Kingdom: Plantae
- Clade: Tracheophytes
- Clade: Angiosperms
- Clade: Monocots
- Order: Asparagales
- Family: Amaryllidaceae
- Subfamily: Allioideae
- Genus: Allium
- Species: A. schoenoprasoides

Binomial name
- Allium schoenoprasoides Regel

Synonyms
- Allium kesselringii Regel; Allium schoenoprasum var. schoenoprasoides (Regel) Nyman

Species of flowering plant

Allium schoenoprasoides is an Asian species of wild onion native to Xinjiang, Kazakhstan, Kyrgyzstan and Tajikistan. It can be found at elevations of 2700–3000 m.

Allium schoenoprasoides produces one egg-shaped bulb up to 15 mm in diameter. Scape is short, rarely more than 20 cm tall. Leaves are tubular, shorter than the scape, 2–3 mm wide. Umbels are spherical, densely packed with many purple flowers crowded together.
