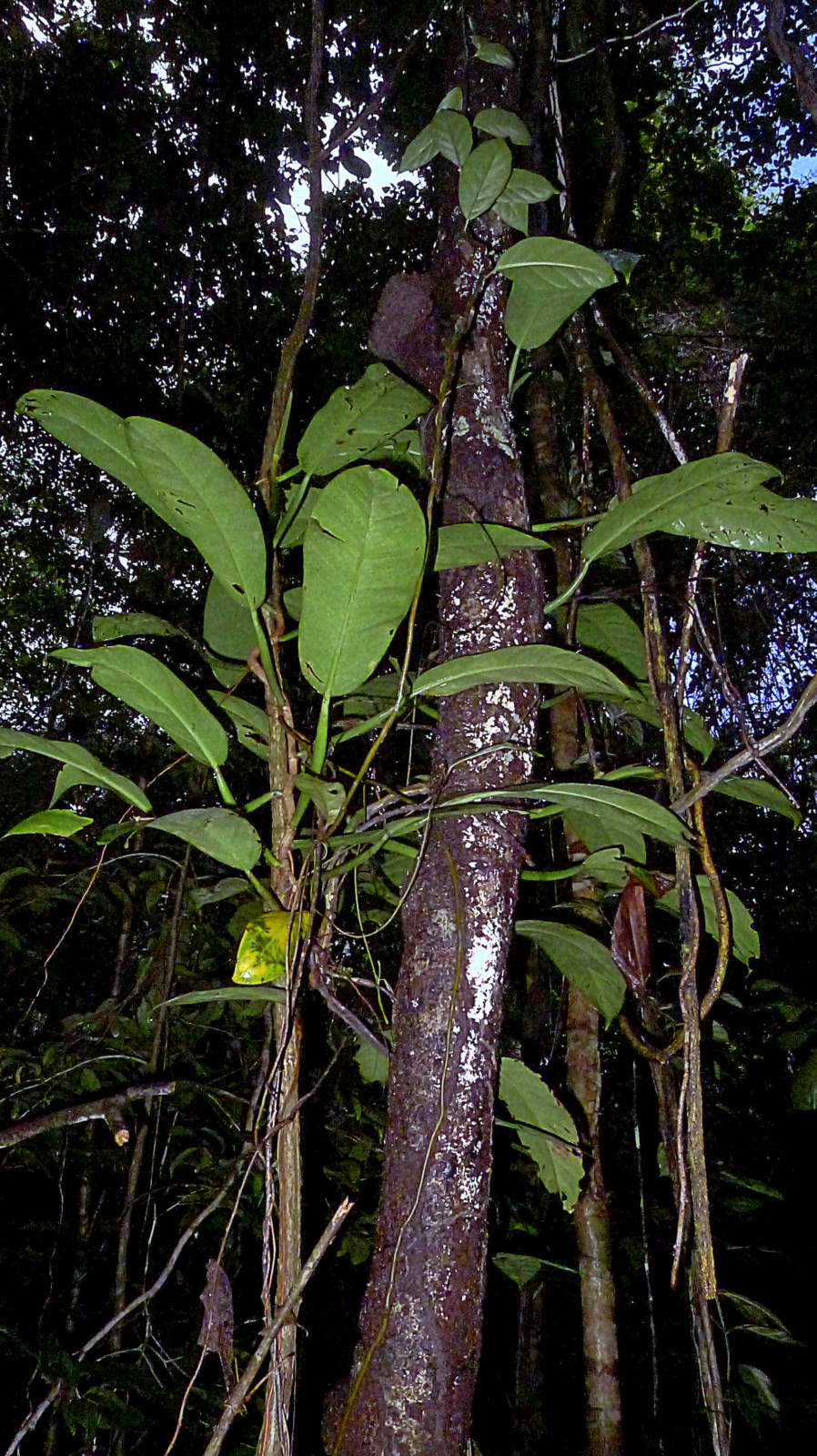
- Adult leaf in Bahia, Brazil

Scientific classification
- Kingdom: Plantae
- Clade: Embryophytes
- Clade: Tracheophytes
- Clade: Spermatophytes
- Clade: Angiosperms
- Clade: Monocots
- Order: Alismatales
- Family: Araceae
- Genus: Philodendron
- Species: P. blanchetianum

Binomial name
- Philodendron blanchetianum Schott

= Philodendron blanchetianum =

Species of flowering plant

Philodendron blanchetianum is a species of flowering plant in the arum family (Araceae) native to the Atlantic Forest of north-eastern and south-eastern Brazil. It is seldom cultivated and is currently known only from a scattering of moist, shaded forest fragments between Pernambuco and northern Espírito Santo. Within that range it tends to occupy stream-side or ravine habitats between about 50 and 500 m (160 and 1,640 ft) elevation.

== Description ==
Philodendron blanchetianum begins life as a small seedling that clings to a host tree and later drops roots to the ground, giving the adult plant the appearance of a loosely climbing vine. Its woody stem grows in short, four-angled segments only 6–9 cm long and about 1–1.3 cm thick; each segment supports one large leaf and sprouts small clasping roots that anchor the plant to the bark.

The mature leaf blade is slim and oblong, tapering slightly at both ends, and measures roughly 34–40 cm (13–16 in) long by 11–13 cm (4.3–5.1 in) wide. It feels papery rather than leathery. The midrib—the main vein down the centre—lies flush with the upper surface and gently rounded beneath, while the finer side veins are so faint they are hard to see unless the leaf is back-lit. The leaf stalk (petiole) is 14–19 cm (5.5–7.5 in) long, subtly swollen in the middle, and wrapped for about one-third of its length by a thin green sheath that protects the young leaf as it develops.

Flowers are produced singly, occasionally in pairs, at the tip of a stem segment. A short stalk 3–6 cm long carries a pale, canoe-shaped spathe 10–18 cm (3.9–7.1 in) long. This spathe surrounds the spadix—a compact spike bearing thousands of tiny flowers. The inner surface of the spathe is white with delicate orange resin canals. The spadix itself is 11–20 cm (4.3–7.9 in) long: its upper two-thirds hold the pale-pink male flowers, and the lower third is packed with greenish female flowers. Each female flower contains a six-chambered ovary that typically forms a single seed in every chamber.

== Habitat and distribution ==
Philodendron blanchetianum is restricted to the Atlantic Forest biome and has so far been documented only from the states of Pernambuco, Alagoas, Bahia and northern Espírito Santo. Within that area it is classed as a "Nordeste Oriental restricted" element and has not been recorded outside the Atlantic biogeographic province. Field surveys show the species growing as a primary hemiepiphyte on trunks or as a root-climbing liana on steep talus slopes in dense evergreen forest, often close to permanent watercourses. Flowering occurs mainly from December to March and fruiting from February to April. Even within suitable habitat it is patchily distributed and can be locally uncommon, a pattern typical of many Atlantic Forest aroids.

== Taxonomy ==
The species was formally described in 1859 by Heinrich Wilhelm Schott. In his brief Latin diagnosis Schott emphasized a suite of readily recognizable characters: obovate-to-oblong leaf blades 10–12 in (≈25–30 cm) long and 3½–4 in (≈9–10 cm) wide, each side bearing six or seven stout primary veins that diverge at a wide angle; petioles about 5 in (≈12 cm) long with a sheath extending more than 1½ in (≈4 cm); a whitish spathe just under 5 in (≈12 cm) long, ending in a tiny cusp; and a spadix of roughly the same length whose lower half is formed by the pistillate zone. Schott based the species on material gathered in Bahia by the collector Jacques Samuel Blanchet, then preserved in Alphonse de Candolle's private herbarium at Geneva. Schott placed it in section Philodendron subgenus Philodendron; subsequent authors have retained that placement, and modern databases continue to accept the species without synonyms.

Cytogenetic work on living material from Pernambuco shows a somatic chromosome number of 2n=34, in line with counts for several congeners in the Atlantic Forest. As of 2010, no molecular phylogenetics study has yet sampled the taxon, but overall morphology places it among the hemiepiphytic species complex sometimes informally referred to as the Philodendron ornatum group.
