= Begonia parvifolia =

Scientific classification
- Kingdom: Plantae
- Clade: Tracheophytes
- Clade: Angiosperms
- Clade: Eudicots
- Clade: Rosids
- Order: Cucurbitales
- Family: Begoniaceae
- Genus: Begonia
- Species: B. parvifolia

Binomial name
- Begonia parvifolia Schott

Species of flowering plant

Begonia parvifolia, called the small-leaved begonia, is a species of flowering plant in the genus Begonia, native to southeast Brazil.
