= Schottariella =

Scientific classification
- Kingdom: Plantae
- Clade: Tracheophytes
- Clade: Angiosperms
- Clade: Monocots
- Order: Alismatales
- Family: Araceae
- Subfamily: Aroideae
- Tribe: Schismatoglottideae
- Genus: Schottariella; P.C.Boyce & S.Y.Wong
- Species: S. mirifica

Binomial name
- Schottariella mirifica P.C.Boyce & S.Y.Wong

Species of flowering plant

Schottariella is a monotypic genus of flowering plants belonging to the family Araceae. The only species is Schottariella mirifica.

The species is found in Borneo.

The genus name of Schottariella is in honour of Heinrich Wilhelm Schott (1794–1865), an Austrian botanist well known for his extensive work on aroids (Family Araceae). The Latin specific epithet of mirifica means 'wonderful, amazing and miraculous'. Both the genus and the species were first described and published in Bot. Stud. (Taipei) Vol.50 on page 269 in 2009.
