= Agia Roumeli =

Agia Roumeli Αγία Ρουμέλη
- Community
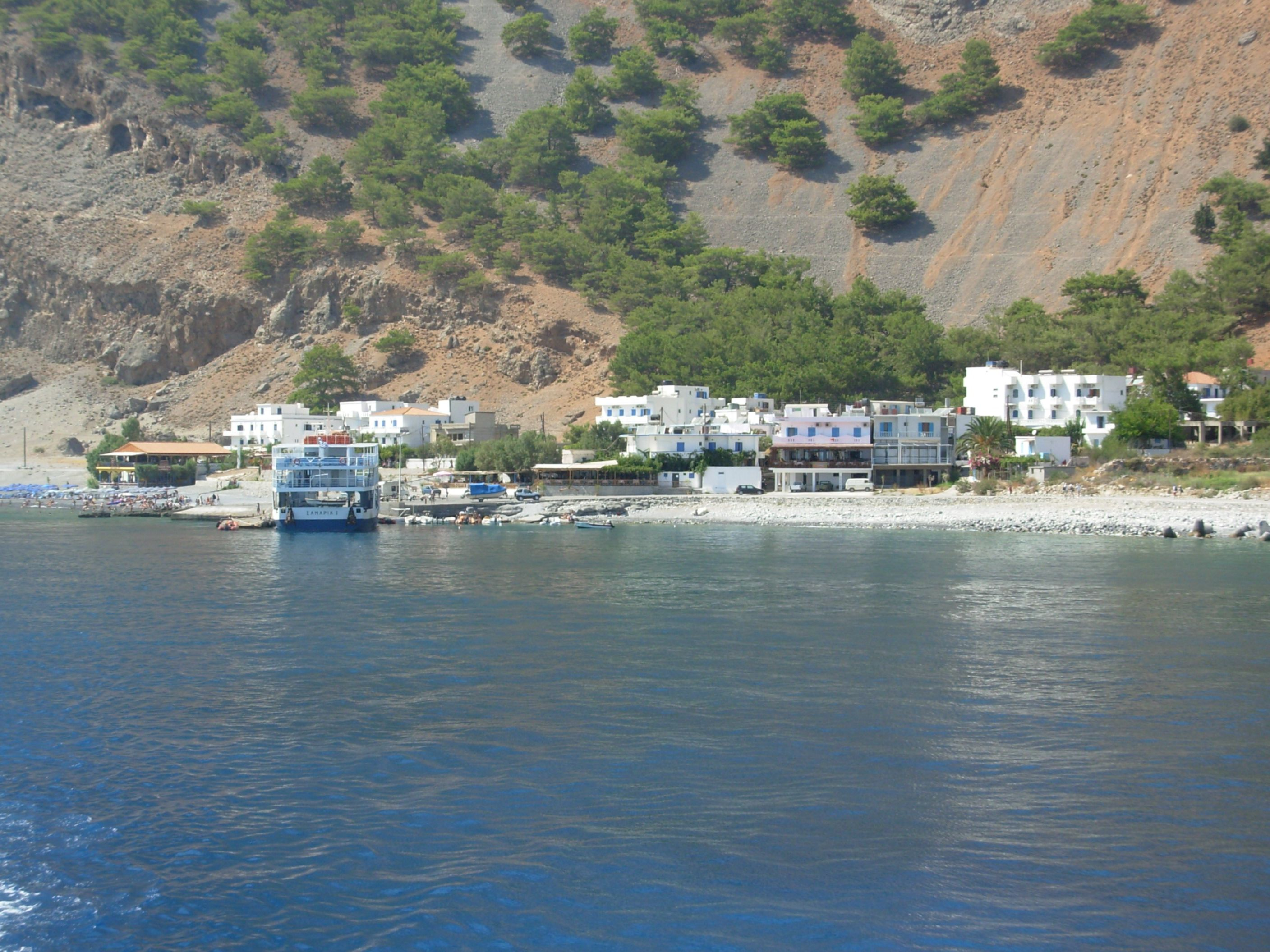
- View of Agia Roumeli from the ferry

- Location within Greece
- Coordinates: 35°13′48″N 23°57′37″E
- Country: Greece
- Administrative region: Crete
- Regional unit: Chania
- Municipality: Sfakia

Population (2021)
  - Community: 78
- Time zone: UTC+2 (EET)
  - Summer (DST): UTC+3 (EEST)
- Website: www.agiaroumeli.com

Agia Roumeli (Greek: Αγιά Ρουμέλη) is a small village in southwest Crete, Greece. It consists of two parallel streets along the water, with several restaurants and souvenir shops. There is an old fortress, called Castle Agia Roumeli, that sits on top of a hill to the west of the village.

== Geography ==
Agia Roumeli sits at the exit of the Samaria Gorge and a 16 kilometer hiking path from the mountainous inland region.

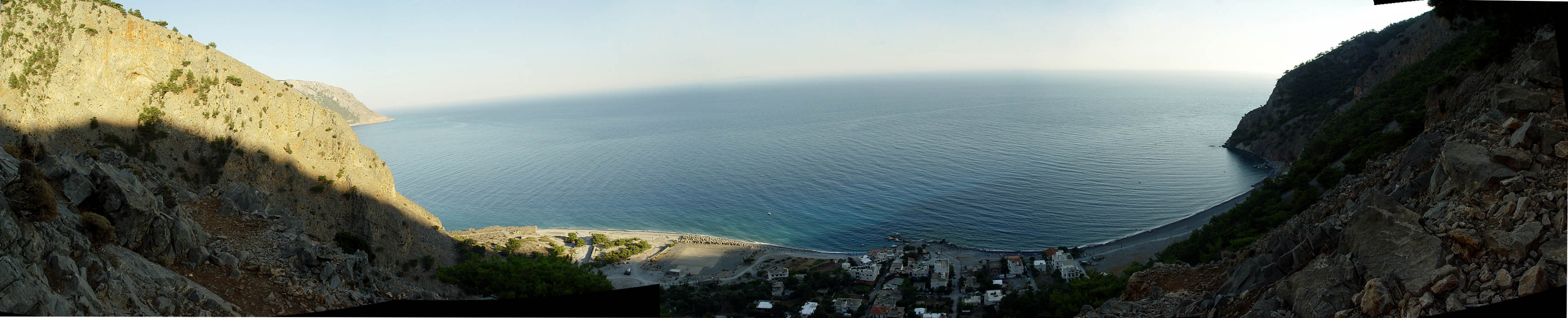
Agia Roumeli from surrounding mountains.

== History ==
Agia Roumeli was originally known as Tarra, an ancient city-state referenced by Homer in the Iliad as one of the Hundred Cities of Greece. In 1867, Turkish soldiers landed on Crete and attempted to move up the Samaria Gorge. They failed to reach it, but did burn down the town of Agia Roumeli.

== Ecology ==
Near the village on Fournoti beach is a plant micro-reserve for the rare shrub Hypericum aciferum. The reserve covers approximately 6.5 hectares and contains more than a hundred plants of the vulnerable species.
