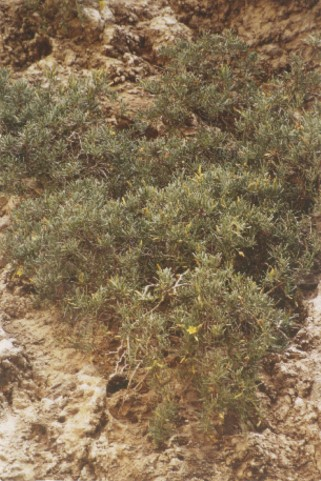

Conservation status
- Vulnerable (IUCN 3.1)

Scientific classification
- Kingdom: Plantae
- Clade: Embryophytes
- Clade: Tracheophytes
- Clade: Angiosperms
- Clade: Eudicots
- Clade: Rosids
- Order: Malpighiales
- Family: Hypericaceae
- Genus: Hypericum
- Section: Hypericum sect. Adenotrias
- Species: H. aciferum

Binomial name
- Hypericum aciferum (Greuter) N.Robson

Synonyms
- Elodes acifera Greuter

= Hypericum aciferum =

Species of flowering plant in the St John's Wort family

Hypericum aciferum is a species of flowering plant in the St John's wort family Hypericaceae. It is a small shrub endemic to the Greek island of Crete. H. aciferum grows in a mat on the ground and has twisting branches, needle-like leaves, and long golden petals. Its flowers are also heterostylous, which means that the species can exhibit one of two flower types on different plants. This trait is unique within the genus Hypericum to H. aciferum, H. russeggeri, and H. aegypticum, the three species in section Adenotrias.

The species was described by Werner Greuter in 1965 as Elodes acifera, and was later placed into section Adenotrias of the genus Hypericum by Norman Robson in 1984. Hypericum aciferum has an extremely limited distribution in the southwest corner of Crete, and is found in rock crevices. It was assessed as endangered several times in the 1980s and 1990s, due to a small population and threats from grazing and fire. It was protected by the European Environment Agency, and a plant micro-reserve was established to conserve it in 2015. The International Union for Conservation of Nature re-assessed H. aciferum as vulnerable in 2021 and recorded its population as stable. The plant is not used by humans for ornamental or pharmaceutical purposes.

== Etymology ==
The genus name Hypericum is possibly derived from the Greek words hyper (above) and eikon (picture), in reference to the tradition of hanging the plant over religious icons in the home. The specific epithet aciferum comes from Latin and possibly refers to the needle-like leaves of the plant.

== Description ==
Hypericum aciferum is a shrublet that grows around 5–6 centimeters tall. The species grows low to the ground, with many twisting branches that press against the soil; these form a mat that can be up to 60 cm wide. The stems and leaves of the plant do not have hairs on their surface, and they also lack any kinds of glands.

The stems are mostly cylindrical when the plant is mature. The leaves are arranged on opposite sides of the stem and are narrow but have a more thick, rounded end. They are 0.5–1.2 cm long and 0.06–0.14 cm wide. The midrib is raised on the underside of the leaf, like the keel of a ship, but is slightly furrowed on the top side. The shape of the leaves is like a needle, and they have the texture of leather.

The flowers are arranged in small, simple clusters that consist of a single branch. Each cluster usually has two or three flowers, each borne on a stalk that is about 0.2 cm long. The flowers are 0.8 cm and are heterostylous, with elliptic sepals and long golden yellow petals. The petals are 0.75 cm long and 0.15 cm wide and curve at their tip. The stamens are in three bundles of three, with fleshy anthers. The seed capsule is septicidal, meaning it splits open along three seams.

Plants of Hypericum aciferum can have one of two types of flowers, a phenomenon known as heterostyly. In Type 1 flowers, the styles are much longer than the stamens; in Type 2 flowers, the stamens are much longer than the styles. Insect pollination is usually only between different types of flowers, encouraging genetic diversity within the species. A small-scale study of the species suggested a ratio of Type 1 to Type 2 flowers of 1:1.5.

Hypericum aciferum is most similar in appearance to the other two species in section Adenotrias: H. russeggeri and H. aegypticum. It can be told apart primarily by its reduced size. In comparison to H. russeggeri, it also has narrower leaves, fewer flowers, petals with less curling, and fewer stamens in each bundle.

== Taxonomy ==
The species was first formally described by Werner Greuter in the journal Candollea in 1965. When discussing which genus to place the new species in, Greuter stated that the species has a similar appearance and natural habitat to plants in the genus Triadenia. However, he also said that he did not believe Triadenia was a valid taxon, because specimens of T. microphylla (the type species on which the genus was based) were found to actually be Hypericum aegypticum. As such, he settled on placing his newly described species into the related genus Elodes, giving it the name Elodes acifera. Furthermore, he hypothesized that a species called Elodes russeggeri (now Hypericum russeggeri and previously Triadenia russeggeri) was closely related to the newly introduced E. acifera. As such, he created a new section within Elodes, naming it Adenotrias.

Norman Robson described the species again in 1967 in the journal Feddes Repertorium, moving it into the genus Hypericum under its currently accepted name Hypericum aciferum. The new name was affirmed in the species catalogue Flora Europaea two years later, and Werner Greuter corroborated the placement in Annales Musei Goulandris in 1973.

At various points since Robson's assignment of the species to Hypericum, several sections of that large genus were split off again. The primary reason for this was certain convergent flower adaptations that Robson dubbed the "Elodes syndrome". While section Adenotrias also possesses those adaptations, it was retained in the genus, meaning that the name Hypericum aciferum remained constant; this was affirmed by a study of molecular phylogenetics in 2013.

== Distribution, habitat, and ecology ==
Hypericum aciferum was originally described from a single location in southwestern Crete. Today, it is known to be endemic to the island of Crete, and is found at only two localities: one in the Sfakia region and the other in the Selino area. Hypericum aciferum is a chasmophyte, often growing in the crevices of rocks. It is found among limestone or other chalky rocks at altitudes of 5–40 meters. Despite having a habitat that is highly similar to that of H. russeggeri and H. aegypticum, it is much less frequently found.

Hypericum aciferum can be found among several other species, including Allium bourgeaui, Centaurea argentea, Dianthus fruticosus, Origanum dictamnus, Ornithogalum creticum, and Staehelina fruticosa. A part of the population is found inside a Pinus halepensis forest. One method by which H. aciferum spreads is via myrmecochory; ants help to disperse its seeds by carrying them from one place to another.

The plant can be propagated easily from seeds stored in a seed bank. This is undertaken by planting seeds in the spring, barely covering them in soil. They are then allowed to germinate for 1–3 months at a temperature of 10–16°C. The plants grow best in sunny, dry rock crevices with protection from winter dampness. Division of mature plants is done in the spring.

== Conservation ==
Location of the Hypericum aciferum PMR

The International Union for Conservation of Nature's List of rare, threatened and endemic plants in Europe listed Hypericum aciferum as being endemic to Greece and an endangered species in 1982. In 1994 the European Environment Agency marked Hypericum aciferum as a "strictly protected flora species". A more detailed assessment was included in the 1995 Red Data Book of Greece, which counted a total of 95 plants of the species in the wild and a few cultivated plants in a municipal garden in Herraklion. H. aciferum was also included in the 1997 IUCN Red List, where its evaluation as an endangered species was confirmed.

Since 2015, most of the population of Hypericum aciferum has been contained within a plant micro-reserve (PMR) of around 6.5 hectares. It is centered near Agia Roumeli on Fournoti beach and consists of the exit of a small gorge area. The PMR contained around 130 plants of the species in 2013 and had a "favorable" situation for conservation, with a goal of eventually reaching 300 plants. Because of the critically low number of plants, however, there is still a high risk of extinction for the species. The largest threats to Hypericum aciferum are human activity, fire, and erosion of its habitat. Livestock grazing and climate change also present slight stressors to the species. The IUCN re-evaluated the species in 2021, assessing Hypericum aciferum as vulnerable and as having a stable population.

== Uses ==
Hypericum aciferum has extremely low suitability for use as a garden plant, and is particularly poor as a potted or patio plant. Unlike other members of Hypericum, the species is not known to have any pharmaceutical use as of 2007.
