= Hypericum confertum =

Scientific classification
- Kingdom: Plantae
- Clade: Tracheophytes
- Clade: Angiosperms
- Clade: Eudicots
- Clade: Rosids
- Order: Malpighiales
- Family: Hypericaceae
- Genus: Hypericum
- Section: H. sect. Taeniocarpium
- Species: H. confertum

Binomial name
- Hypericum confertum Choisy

Species of flowering plant

Hypericum confertum is a species of flowering plant of the St. John's Wort family (Hypericaceae) which is native from Turkey to Lebanon and on the island of Cyprus.
