= Joseph Russegger =

Austrian geologist

Joseph Ritter von Russegger
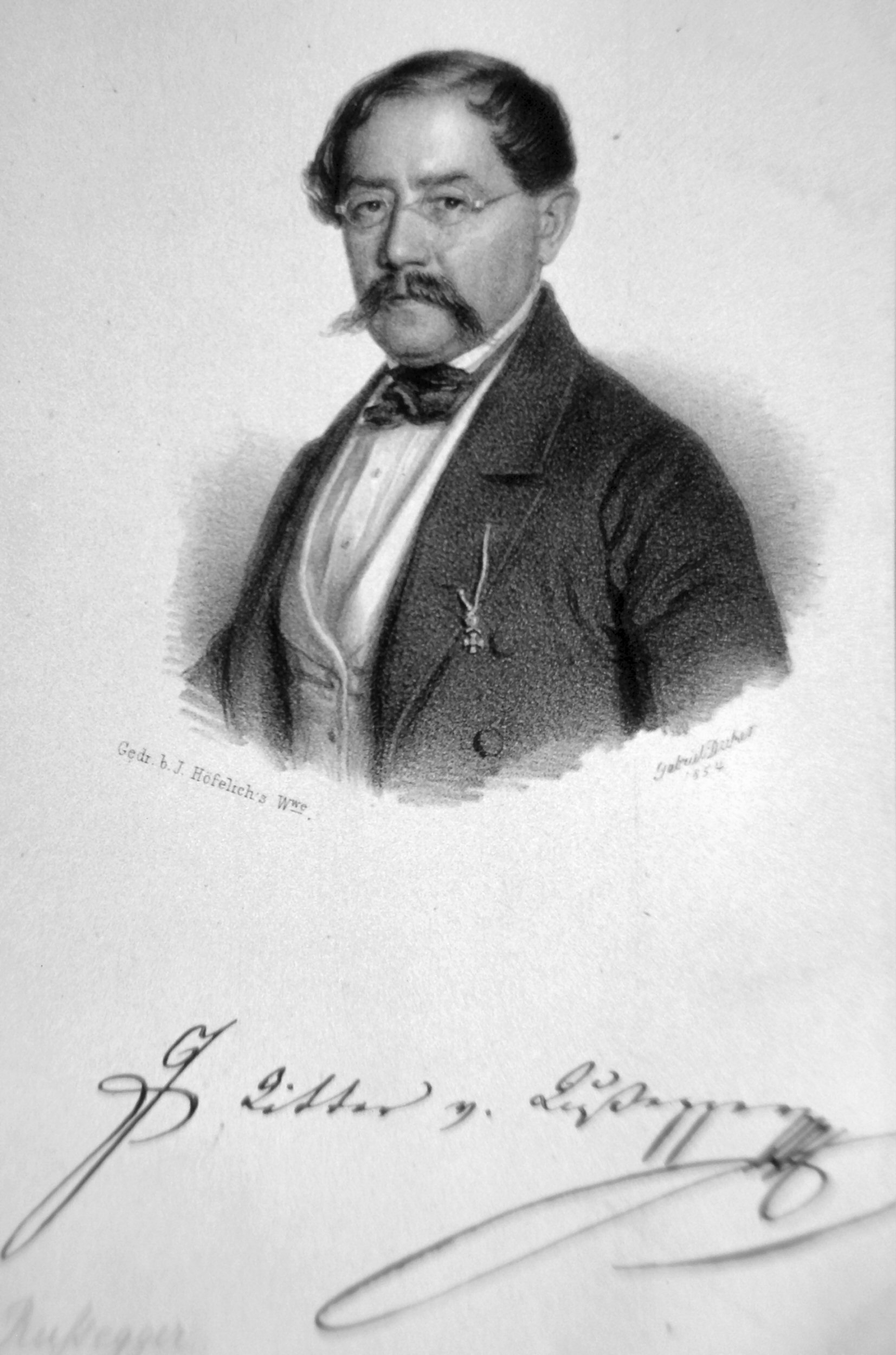
- Born: 18 October 1802; Salzburg, Prince-Archbishopric of Salzburg
- Died: 20 June 1863 (aged 60); Banská Štiavnica, Kingdom of Hungary
- Scientific career
- Fields: Geology

Joseph Ritter von Russegger (18 October 1802 – 20 June 1863) was an Austrian geologist who was a native of Salzburg.

He received his education in Salzburg, and in the years 1823 to 1825, was associated with the Mining and Forestry Academy at Schemnitz. From 1831 to 1835, he served as a manager of mines at Böckstein.

From 1836 he conducted geological studies in northern Africa, the Middle East and Asia Minor. On the expedition, he was accompanied by botanist Theodor Kotschy (1813-1866). In Egypt, at the request of Viceroy Mohammed Ali (1769-1849), he carried out geognostic and geological investigations of the country. In Sudan he explored its mineral resources that included searches for gold. On his return trip to Europe (1839), on behalf of King Otto, he investigated Greek mining interests. Afterwards, he extensively toured the continent (Italy, south-western Germany, France, Britain, Scandinavia, et al.). As a result of the expedition, he published the multi-volume series Reisen in Europa, Asien und Afrika (1841 to 1850).

In 1843, he was appointed vice-director of the Berg- und Salinendirection for Tirol, and in 1850 became director of the Lower Hungarian mining district. In 1848, he became a member of the Vienna Academy of Sciences.

== Additional sources ==
- ADB: Russegger, Joseph Ritter von @ Allgemeine Deutsche Biographie
- Geological Maps of Europe 1780-1918
- This article incorporates information based on a translation of an equivalent article at the German Wikipedia.
