= Hypericum balfourii =

Conservation status
- Vulnerable (IUCN 3.1)

Scientific classification
- Kingdom: Plantae
- Clade: Tracheophytes
- Clade: Angiosperms
- Clade: Eudicots
- Clade: Rosids
- Order: Malpighiales
- Family: Hypericaceae
- Genus: Hypericum
- Section: Hypericum sect. Camplyosporus
- Species: H. balfourii

Binomial name
- Hypericum balfourii N. Robson

Species of flowering plant in the St John's wort family

Hypericum balfourii is a species of flowering plant in the family Hypericaceae. It is endemic to Socotra, an island archipelago that is part of Yemen. It grows in mountain shrubland. It is usually found on granite terrain above 600 meters in elevation.
