= Theodor Kotschy =

Austrian botanist and explorer (1813–1866)

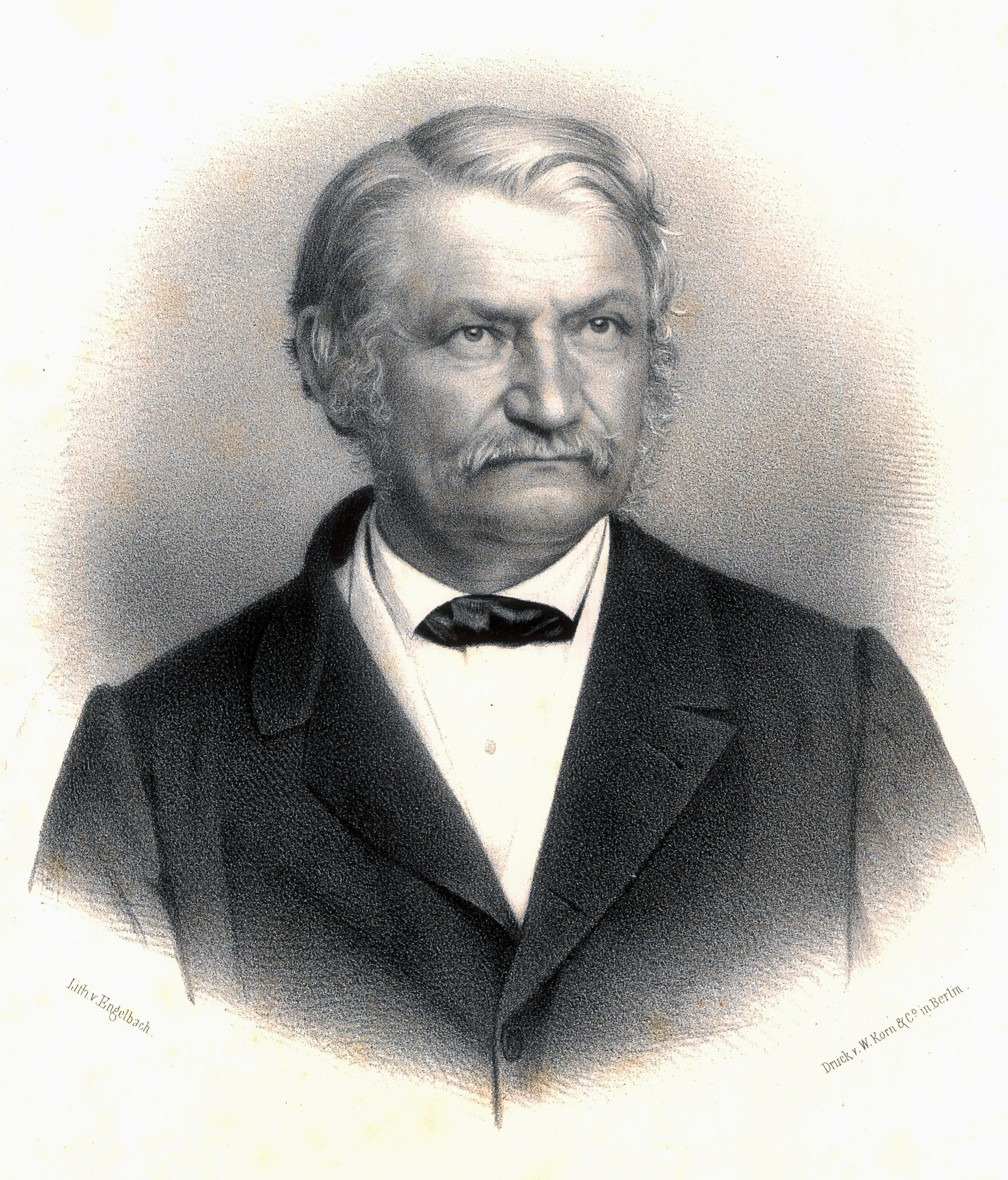
- Portrait of Theodor Kotschy from Schweinfurth (1868)
- Born: April 15, 1813
- Died: June 11, 1866 (aged 53)
- Occupations: Botanist and explorer

Karl Georg Theodor Kotschy Polish: Teodor Koczy (15 April 1813 – 11 June 1866) was an Austrian botanist and explorer. On his botanical investigations, Kotschy collected large amounts of plants. For example, he described forty species of oak in this work, most of which are now considered synonyms, but Quercus look is recognised as valid.

== Biography ==
Kotschy was born in Ustroń in Austrian Silesia (today Poland). He was the son of theologian Carl Friedrich Kotschy (1789–1856).

Kotschy studied theology in Vienna from 1833. From 1836 to 1862 he performed extensive botanical research throughout the Middle East and northern Africa, in which he collected over 300,000 botanical specimens. Beginning in 1836, he accompanied geologist Joseph Russegger (1802–1863) on a scientific trip to Cilicia and Syria, afterwards journeying through Nubia and Sennar. Following the dissolution with Russegger's expedition, he remained in Egypt. He later traveled to Kurdufan (1839), Cyprus, Syria, Mesopotamia and Kurdistan (1840–41); and during 1842–43 he undertook an expedition to Persia. Between 1843 and 1846 Rudolph Friedrich Hohenacker edited and sold three exsiccata series with plant specimens from Iran, Iraq and Syria collected by Kotschy, the first one named Th. Kotschy. Pl. Alepp. Kurd. Moss. Ed. Hohenacker. 1843. The collections from 1839 to 1841 were partly distributed by the German scientific society Unio Itineraria as exsiccata-like series under the title Kotschyi Iter Nubicum. Unio itineraria. On August 1, 1843, probably as the first European, he conquered the highest peak in today's Iran - Mount Damavand (5,609 m above sea level) in the Alborz. Starting with 1853 Kotschy curated and distributed series resembing exsiccatae himself, among others one under the title Iter Cilicico-Kurdicum 1859 and another entitled Plantae Syriae borealis 1862. A series of numbered duplicate specimens called Plantae Transylvaniae Herbarii Schott was collected by Kotschy in 1850 and distributed with printed labels from the herbarium of Heinrich Wilhelm Schott.

He was appointed Assistant Curator in 1847 and Custos-Adjunct in 1852 at Vienna. In 1862 he performed additional botanical research in Egypt, Palestine, and Lebanon (1855) in Cyprus, Asia Minor, and Kurdistan (1859), and back to Cyprus (1862). He died in Vienna at the age of 53.

== Legacy ==
The plant genus Kotschya from the family Fabaceae is named in his honor. His name is associated with a species of lizard, Kotschy’s gecko (Mediodactylus kotschyi), with the Cyprus bee orchid (Ophrys kotschyi), a crocus species (Crocus kotschyanus), discovered by him in southeastern Turkey, as well as the Lebanese oak species Quercus kotschyana.

== Selected publications ==
- Reise in den cilicischen Taurus überTarsus. (1858); First description of the region of Bulghar Dagh, western Taurus.
- Abbildungen und Beschreibungen neuer und seltener Thiere und Pflanzen, in Syrien und im westlichen Taurus gesammelt, (Illustrations and descriptions of new and rare animals and plants, in Syria and western Taurus); (1843)
- Analecta botanica (with Heinrich Wilhelm Schott (1794–1865) and Carl Fredrik Nyman 1820–1893), (1854)
- Coniferen des Cilicischen Taurus (Conifers of Cilician Taurus), (with Franz Antoine 1815–1886), (1855)
- Die Eichen Europas und des Orients, (Oaks of Europe and the Orient); (1858–1862)
- Plantae Tinneanae (with Johann Joseph Peyritsch 1835–1889); (1867)

== Note ==
- Parts of this article are based on a translation of an equivalent article at the German Wikipedia.
