= Carl Fredrik Nyman =

Swedish botanist

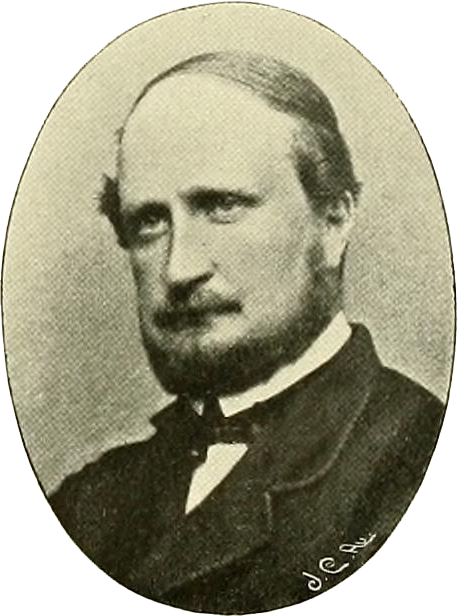

Carl Fredrik Nyman (31 August 1820 – 26 April 1893) was a Swedish botanist born in Stockholm. His middle name is alternatively spelled Frederik or Frederick.

Nyman was a curator at the Swedish Museum of Natural History in Stockholm (1855–1889). With Heinrich Wilhelm Schott (1794–1865) and Theodor Kotschy (1813–1866), he was editor of Analecta Botanica (1854). Among his publications are the following:

The plant genus Nymania (synonym Phyllanthus) was named in his honor by Karl Moritz Schumann. In 1891 Otto Kuntze named the genus Nymanina after him.
