= Heinrich Wilhelm Schott =

Austrian botanist (1794–1865)

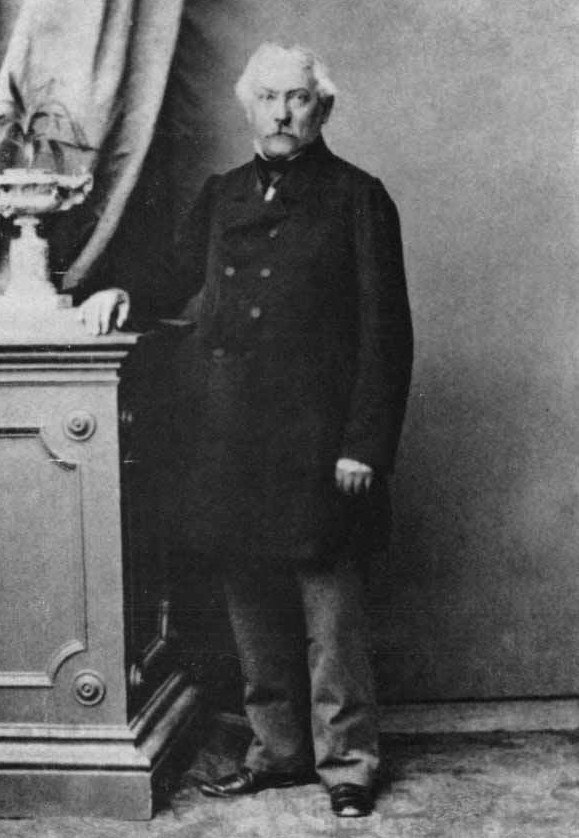
- Born: 7 January 1794; Brno, Moravia
- Died: 5 May 1865 (aged 71); Vienna, Austrian Empire
- Education: University of Vienna
- Known for: study of aroids, participation in the Austrian Brazil Expedition
- Scientific career
- Fields: Botany
- Workplaces: Schönbrunn Palace
- Author abbrev. (botany): Schott

Heinrich Wilhelm Schott (7 January 1794 – 5 March 1865) was an Austrian botanist. He is known for his extensive work on aroids (Araceae).

== Biography ==
Schott was born on 7 January 1794 in Brno, Moravia. He studied botany, agriculture and chemistry at the University of Vienna, where he was a pupil of Joseph Franz von Jacquin (1766–1839). He was a participant in the Austrian Brazil Expedition from 1817 to 1821. In 1828 he was appointed Hofgärtner (royal gardener) in Vienna, later serving as director of the Imperial Gardens at Schönbrunn Palace (1845). In 1852 he was in charge of transforming part of palace gardens in the fashion of an English garden. He also enriched the Viennese court gardens with his collections from Brazil. He was also interested in Alpine flora, and was responsible for development of the alpinum at Belvedere Palace in Vienna.

In 2008, botanists P.C.Boyce & S.Y.Wong published Schottarum, a genus of flowering plants from Borneo belonging to the family Araceae. Then they published Schottariella, a monotypic genus of flowering plants from Borneo belonging to the family Araceae, both genera were named in honour of Heinrich Wilhelm Schott.

Schott died on 5 March 1865 at Schönbrunn Palace, Vienna, at the age of 71.

== Publications ==
- Meletemata botanica (with Stephan Ladislaus Endlicher), 1832
- Rutaceae. Fragmenta botanica, 1834
- Genera filicum, 1834–1836
- Aroideae, 1853–1857
- Analecta botanica (with Theodor Kotschy and Carl Fredrik Nyman), 1854
- Synopsis Aroidearum, 1856
- Icones Aroidearum, 1857
- Genera Aroidearum Exposita, 1858
- Prodromus Systematis Aroidearum, 1860
