= Plant micro-reserve =

Small nature preserve

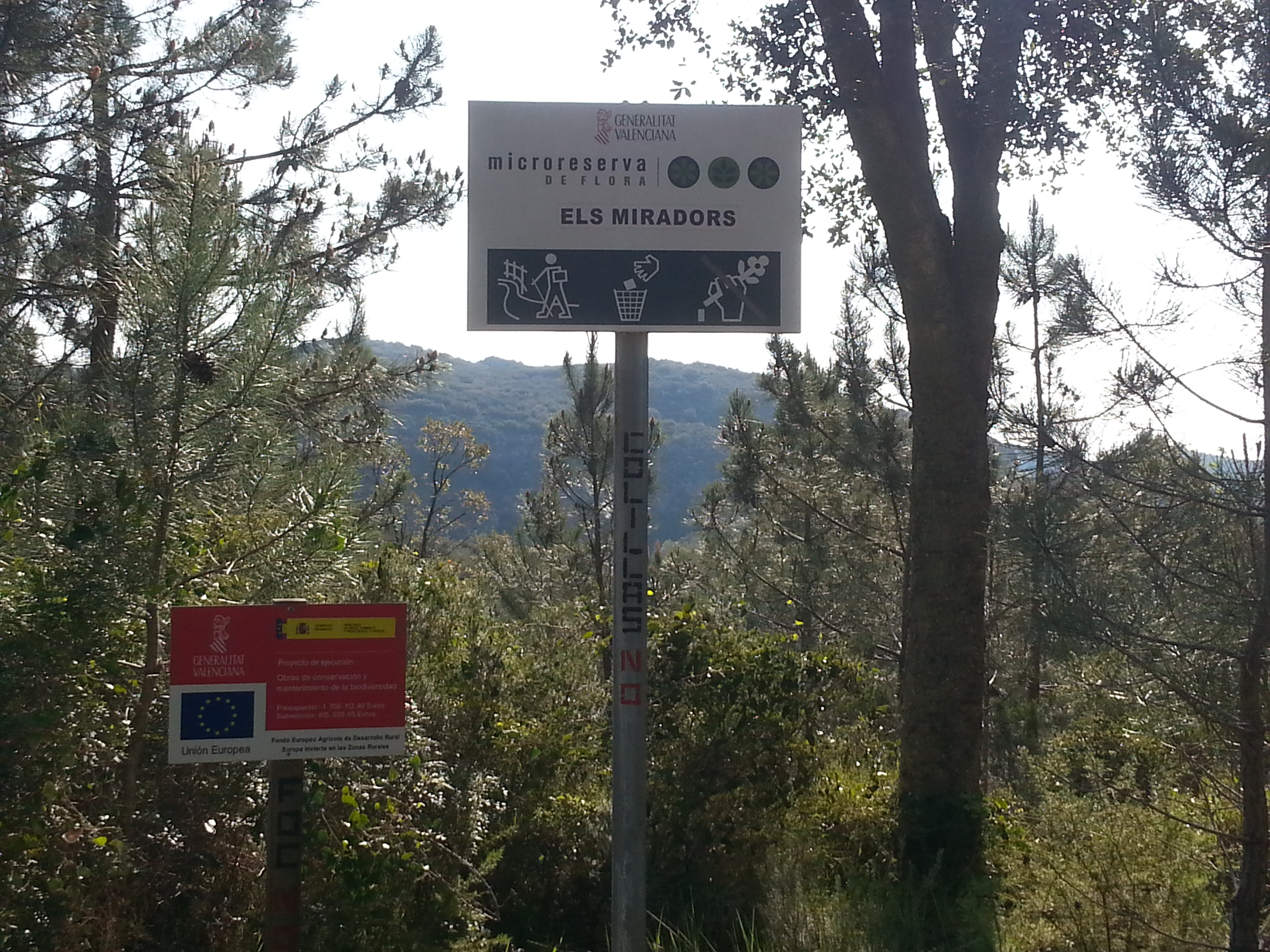
Informational sign at the Els Miradors PMR in Pinet, Valencia

A plant micro-reserve (PMR) is a type of small nature reserve that conserves rare or threatened plant species. A micro-reserve centers around a single habitat or plant habitat, and is usually smaller than 20 hectares. They also serve as hotspots for biodiversity monitoring, seed collection, and plant management. A PMR may be located on public or private land, and is established by a governmental agency securing a voluntary turnover of the area. They are managed by national, regional, or local governments, or by individuals, families, or non-governmental organizations.

The concept of a PMR was first piloted in the Spanish province of Valencia in 1990, and was subsequently funded by the European LIFE programme. The concept spread to other regions of Spain, and then to other countries in Europe. In Latvia, the existing program of Woodland Key Habitats (WKHs) was adapted into a network of PMRs that received funding to purchase private land for reserves from 2001 to 2011. In Cyprus, the concept was further developed by incorporating strategies like intensive management and planting new seedlings of endangered species. Additional projects have also been started in Bulgaria, Slovenia, and Egypt. PMR advocates have proposed applications of the concept in Madeira, China, and in various parts of Italy.

== Characteristics ==
While the precise definition of a plant micro-reserve may vary based on which country it has been established in, a 2014 LIFE programme planning document described them as "protected natural plots to ensure the biological monitoring and conservation management". PMRs can be focused on many different kinds of locations and habitats. Each of these habitats can be considered as a "biogeographic island", with unique evolutionary pressures that force adaptations and lead to increased biodiversity. Smaller sites may be characterized by a spring, small islet, or coastal cliffside. Larger sites might have such pressures as skeletal or saline soil, or rocky scree.

There is also no exact requirement for the size of a plant micro-reserve. In Crete and Spain, they are considered to be reserves with an area of less than 20 hectares, while elsewhere in the Mediterranean the upper limit is 100 hectares. However, they have the shared characteristic of intensively protecting one or several highly threatened plant species, usually endemics. PMRs are often organized based on "singularity", or the individual site, and "complementarity", or their ability to contribute to a larger patchwork of conservational areas. According to proponents of the concept, a plant micro-reserve should consist of the core protection area, where the defining habitat feature is located, and be surrounded by a buffer area to reduce the impact of external threats. However, for some PMRs that are surrounded by a large amount of human developments, buffer zones may be impossible to establish. In either place, boundaries should be clearly defined by landmarking and signposts. These may consist of informational signs directed at visitors or tourists, indicative signals to warn against unintentional damage to the protected area, or perimetric signals to demarcate the exact border of the reserve.

While governments may seize land for certain types of conservation, the area of a plant micro-reserve must be obtained voluntarily. Private or public entities can turn over land to be managed as a PMR, but this agreement is permanent and not revokable. When turning over an area for a PMR, entities may define a specific geographic area for preservation or designate the population of a plant species as protected. In the latter case, the land PMRs encompass could shift based on the protected population. Privately owned PMRs are run by either individual families or landowners, or by conservation non-governmental organizations (NGOs). Public reserves are owned by either city councils, provincial governments, or national governments.

Inside a micro-reserve, certain actions that would damage the protected plants are forbidden. In all PMRs, no human action can be taken that would impact the protected plants themselves or the soil substrate they live on. The exception to this rule is that livestock ranching may be allowed for plants that rely on grazing to reproduce. Each micro-reserve may also have additional prohibitions on a case-to-case basis, such as restrictions on hiking or climbing. Certain activity is allowed in PMRs that might be forbidden in other types of nature preserves, such as hunting animals and gathering invertebrates. These human activities are sometimes even encouraged, especially when they contribute to the maintenance of the current state of the PMR. Additionally, PMRs are rarely fenced or otherwise cut off from surrounding areas by physical barriers.

=== Purpose ===
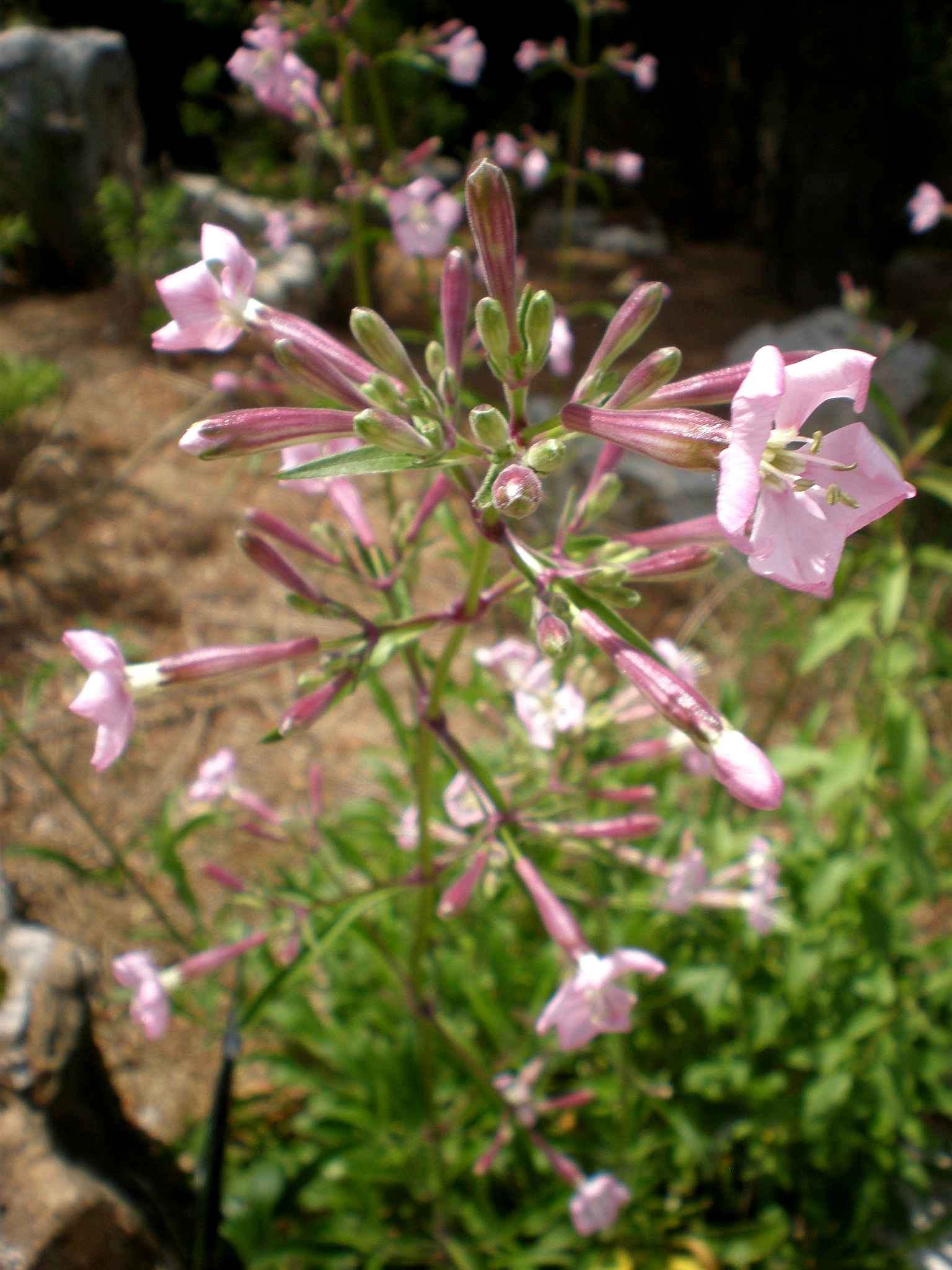
Silene hifacensis was reintroduced to its previous habitats following seed collection from a plant micro-reserve.

The general purpose of a plant micro reserve is to provide a protected area for the conservation of rare plants that can only thrive in a very limited niche or habitat. PMRs must be actively managed; conservation areas that only have "passive or preventative protection" should not be considered PMRs. They help preserve the type localities of plant species, and protect against uncontrolled urban sprawl by restricting changes to land use. Seeds collected from PMRs can be used to reintroduce plants to localities where they were previously extinct, as was the case with Medicago arborea subsp. citrina and Silene hifacensis.

PMRs can also be used to educate the public on conservation. They change public perceptions on land that was previously considered "unproductive", increase locals' knowledge of their endemic plant species, and tie plants to that community's identity. Micro-reserves can also maintain wild populations of useful cultivated plants for ethnobotanical study and use. By requiring only a simple contract of around two pages to be established, PMRs shorten the bureaucratic process. This lowers the barrier of entry for small NGOs or villages to participate in conservation efforts.

In nature reserves, the focus is usually on protecting animal species; PMRs have the express purpose of protecting plant species. Another focus of traditional reserves that has unintended consequences is their goal of preserving climax communities at the end stages of an ecosystem's development, particularly old-growth forests. This often means that endemic pioneering plants or species that require direct sunlight are inadvertently harmed by conservation efforts. Because biomass management such as grazing or firewood collection can be allowed in PMRs, those methods may be used to protect and maintain the surviving habitats for those types of shrubs and grasses.

=== Shortcomings ===
There are a variety of shortcomings that restrict the effectiveness of plant micro-reserves. The inconsistency of their definition, lack of consideration for past and future evolutionary developments, and their fragmented and dispersed nature are obstacles to successful conservation. In Europe, there is a wide range of scale in conservation efforts, from Nature Monuments of just a few square meters to National Parks of massive size. This means that PMRs have to compete and fit into a chaotic patchwork of regulations. Other issues include the low representation of non-endemic species, and those that are not immediately critically endangered, in PMRs. Additionally, some of the most rare species are only found on private land, which the government cannot forcefully turn into a PMR if the owner does not want the land to be preserved.

Many coastal PMRs have been heavily eroded because of new breakwater construction in nearby areas. Previously strong populations of threatened endemics like Limonium rigualii and Silene cambessedesii have been reduced or destroyed by coastal erosion of PMRs. Because authorities that manage PMRs have no jurisdiction outside of the protected reserve, they cannot contest or undo the development of external structures that impact the plants inside the PMR.

== Project histories ==
The modern concept of a protected area of small dimensions was originally described in 1981, with a proposal for mini-reserves to legally demarcate "enclaves" of endemic flora. The model location for the proposal was a Spanish site called "La Encantada" in Villarrobledo, Albacete. The concept was expanded upon over the following decade, and the first plant micro-reserve was fully established in 1990 in Valencia. The concept was officially recognized by the European Union in 1994, and started to be funded by its LIFE programme. It was considered a good candidate for small-scale conservation because of its high number of rare endemic species, mountainous terrain that creates many distinct micro-habitats, and the presence of isolated relict species throughout the province. The project area was especially fit for PMRs because of its wide array of climates and elevation. Additionally, the PMRs could protect the entire population of several species found nowhere else in the world, such as Limonium perplexum. By 2001, more than 150 locations had been identified and began the process of recognition, of which 14 were already officially declared plant micro-reserves. The concept later spread to other regions of Spain, such as Castilla La Mancha. There, the plant micro-reserves primarily focused on more aquatic habitats such as bogs, ponds, and salt lagoons. Some PMRs there also target inland dunes and gypsum steppes.

The precursor to PMRs in Latvia were called Woodland Key Habitats (WKHs), which were characterized by high concentrations of rare species that require specific types of forested environments to thrive. However, there was no official protection for WKHs under Latvian law. The micro-reserve concept was first introduced in the country in 2001, under a slightly different framework than the Valencian PMRs. The first reserve targeted a part of the habitat of the middle spotted woodpecker, while subsequent reserves have been created by a patchwork of independent organizations. However, by 2012 there were more than two thousand reserves covering nearly forty-thousand hectares. Most of these are not specifically for plants, but also protect various bird species. Around 12% of the reserves are PMRs dedicated to forests, other vascular plants, or bryophytes. Until 2011, financial compensation was given to landowners that turned over their property for nature preservation, but due to budget constraints the program was stopped.

In 2010, a new project to establish several PMRs on Cyprus began. When the project was completed three years later, five micro-reserves had been established. They protected four plant species and two critical habitats. (Note: The plant species were Ophrys kotschyi, Arabis kennedyae, Centaurea akamantis, and Astragalus macrocarpus subsp. lefkarensis. The habitats were scrub and low vegetation of Quercus alnifolia and Cedrus brevifolia forests.) Management of the Cypriot PMRs included new efforts, such as removing flammable biomass, rerouting human paths through the reserves to be less destructive, and culling competitive species that encroached on threatened plants. The project also resulted in the planting of more than 200 additional seedlings for most of the targeted species. Additionally, seeds were distributed to a Cypriot botanical garden and the national seed bank of Cyprus.

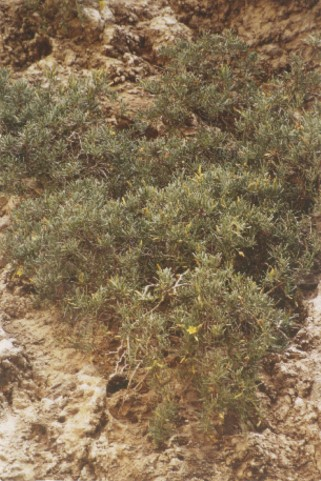
Hypericum aciferum is one endangered species protected by a Cretan plant micro-reserve.

An extensive pilot project to expand the PMR concept to the island of Crete was undertaken, and by 2013 there were seven reserves established, all on public land. Each of the seven reserves targeted a different species of importance to the European Community. (Note: The targeted species were Androcymbium rechingeri, Anthemis glaberrima, Bupleurum kakiskalae, Cephalanthera cucullata, Hypericum aciferum, Nepeta sphaciotica, and Phoenix palm groves.)The pilot includes limited monitoring and management involvement, such as recording meteorological data, plant caging, artificial pollination, and the hiring of wardens from local villages to protect the PMRs. The Cretan flora were clearly divided in two categories: those that faced many threats but still had large populations, and those with small populations that faced extinction. One of the project's focuses was combating over-grazing and reversing genetic erosion caused by unsustainably small plant populations.

In Bulgaria, an initial project for the implementation of the PMR concept took place from 2010 to 2014, and saw the creation of 58 small protected areas following the model of the Valencian plant micro-networks. Bulgarian PMRs can be established either around a habitat of an endangered species, or around a "remarkable landscape" irrespective of the plant species located there. The Bulgarian project included 44 vascular plants, as well as three bryophyte species. (Note: The bryophyte species were Mannia androgyna, Riccia crustata, and Trichocolea tomentella.)

Several other smaller projects have also been undertaken. In Slovenia, a small network of micro-reserves was established in the Karst Edge area, which consists of rocky limestone slopes and dry grasslands. The project, which was completed in 2005, specifically targeted the plant species Moehringia tommasiniana as well as several butterflies and amphibians. Five PMRs were planned to be established on the Sinai peninsula, but were stalled following the political upheaval of the Arab Spring in 2011.

== Proposals and future development ==
Several proposals have been made for the expansion of the plant micro-reserve concept. In Sicily, there were no regulations that protected wild plants in 2013. A proposal called for a PMR to protect a population of Silene hicesiae on Panarea island. The reserve would be "intensely managed" because the small population of the species is threatened by a variety of pressures. Also in 2013, seven PMR sites were proposed in the Portuguese archipelago of Madeira out of 148 surveyed locations. They specifically focused on protecting sites from new buildings, trash accumulation, and invasive species competition. In response to Chinese plans to protect Plant Species with Extremely Small Populations (PSESPs) in that country, a proposal was made in 2017 to adopt the PMR model in order to describe new species and protect against rapid urbanization. In 2021, a proposal was made to protect Acis nicaeensis in Monaco and Nice from urban sprawl. The region was claimed to be highly suitable to the PMR concept because of the mountainous terrain that leads to many disjointed plant populations.
