= Pseudohypericin =

Names
- Preferred IUPAC name 1,3,4,6,8,13-Hexahydroxy-10-(hydroxymethyl)-11-methylphenanthro[3,4,5,6-fghij]perylene-7,14-dione

Identifiers
CAS Number	55954-61-5
3D model (JSmol)	Interactive image
ChEBI	CHEBI:8605
ChEMBL	ChEMBL1614664
ChemSpider	4445065
ECHA InfoCard	100.111.993
EC Number	611-335-2
KEGG	C10392
PubChem CID	4978
UNII	MQ0U4663ZO
CompTox Dashboard (EPA)	DTXSID00204541
- InChI: InChI=1S/C30H16O9/c1-7-2-9(32)19-23-15(7)16-8(6-31)3-10(33)20-24(16)28-26-18(12(35)5-14(37)22(26)30(20)39)17-11(34)4-13(36)21(29(19)38)25(17)27(23)28/h2-5,31,34-39H,6H2,1H3 Key: NODGUBIGZKATOM-UHFFFAOYSA-N
- SMILES: CC1=CC(=O)C2=C(C3=C(C=C(C4=C3C5=C6C7=C(C1=C25)C(=CC(=O)C7=C(C8=C(C=C(C4=C86)O)O)O)CO)O)O)O

Properties
Chemical formula	C_{30}H_{16}O_{9}
Molar mass	520.449 g·mol^{−1}
log P	4.5
- Except where otherwise noted, data are given for materials in their standard state (at 25 °C [77 °F], 100 kPa). Infobox references

Pseudohypericin is an aromatic polycyclic dione that is very closely related to hypericin. It is found most commonly in the St. John's wort family of plants, namely in Hypericum perforatum. In preliminary studies in animal models, pseudohypericin has shown antiviral effects. It may also contribute to the potential antidepressant effect of Hypericum perforatum extracts.
