= Spathulenol =

Names
- IUPAC name 6β,11-Cyclo-4α,5β-guai-10(14)-en-4-ol
- Systematic IUPAC name (1aR,4aR,7S,7aR,7bR)-1,1,7-Trimethyl-4-methylidenedecahydro-1H-cyclopropa[e]azulen-7-ol
- Other names Spatulenol

Identifiers
CAS Number	6750-60-3
3D model (JSmol)	Interactive image
ChEBI	CHEBI:132824
ChEMBL	ChEMBL518542
ChemSpider	83268
PubChem CID	92231
UNII	7XV9L96SJJ
CompTox Dashboard (EPA)	DTXSID00881210
- InChI: InChI=1S/C15H24O/c1-9-5-6-11-13(14(11,2)3)12-10(9)7-8-15(12,4)16/h10-13,16H,1,5-8H2,2-4H3/t10-,11+,12+,13+,15-/m0/s1 Key: FRMCCTDTYSRUBE-BGPZULBFSA-N
- SMILES: C[C@@]1(CC[C@@H]2[C@@H]1[C@H]3[C@H](C3(C)C)CCC2=C)O

Properties
Chemical formula	C_{15}H_{24}O
Molar mass	220.356 g·mol^{−1}
- Except where otherwise noted, data are given for materials in their standard state (at 25 °C [77 °F], 100 kPa). Infobox references

Spathulenol is a tricyclic sesquiterpene alcohol which has a basic skeleton similar to the azulenes. It occurs in oregano among other plants.

== History and occurrence ==
A volatile oil was extracted from mugwort distillery (Artemisia vulgaris) and tarragon (Artemisia dracunculus), from which the sesquiterpene alcohol spathulenol was isolated for the first time in 1975 as a colorless, viscous compound with an earth-aromatic odor and bitter-spicy taste.
