= Robert Keller (botanist) =

Swiss botanist (1854–1939)

Robert Keller (24 September 1854 – 8 July 1939) was a Swiss botanist from Oberembrach, a village near Winterthur.

In 1877 he obtained his doctorate from the University of Jena, subsequently working as a teacher in the education sector of Winterthur; initially at the Mädchenschule, then from 1880 at the gymnasium and afterwards at its industrial school. From 1891 to 1916, he was rector of municipal schools. In Winterthur, he strove for various educational reforms, and was curator of the city's natural science collections.

As a botanist, his primary research dealt with plant systematics and floristics. The species, Schizachyrium kelleri is one of the plants that bears his name; its botanical authors being Eduard Hackel (1850–1926) and Otto Stapf (1857–1933).

== Selected publications ==
- Flora von Winterthur 1891-1896 – Flora of Winterthur.
- Flora der Schweiz (four editions, with Hans Schinz 1858–1941); 1900-1923 – Flora of Switzerland.
- Übersicht über die Schweiz. Rubi 1919 – treatise on blackberries of Switzerland.
- Synopsis rosarum spontanearum Europae mediae 1931 – treatise on wild roses.

In 1894, Keller edited and distributed the exsiccata-like specimen series Herbarium normale rosarum Europaearum.
