= Hypericin =

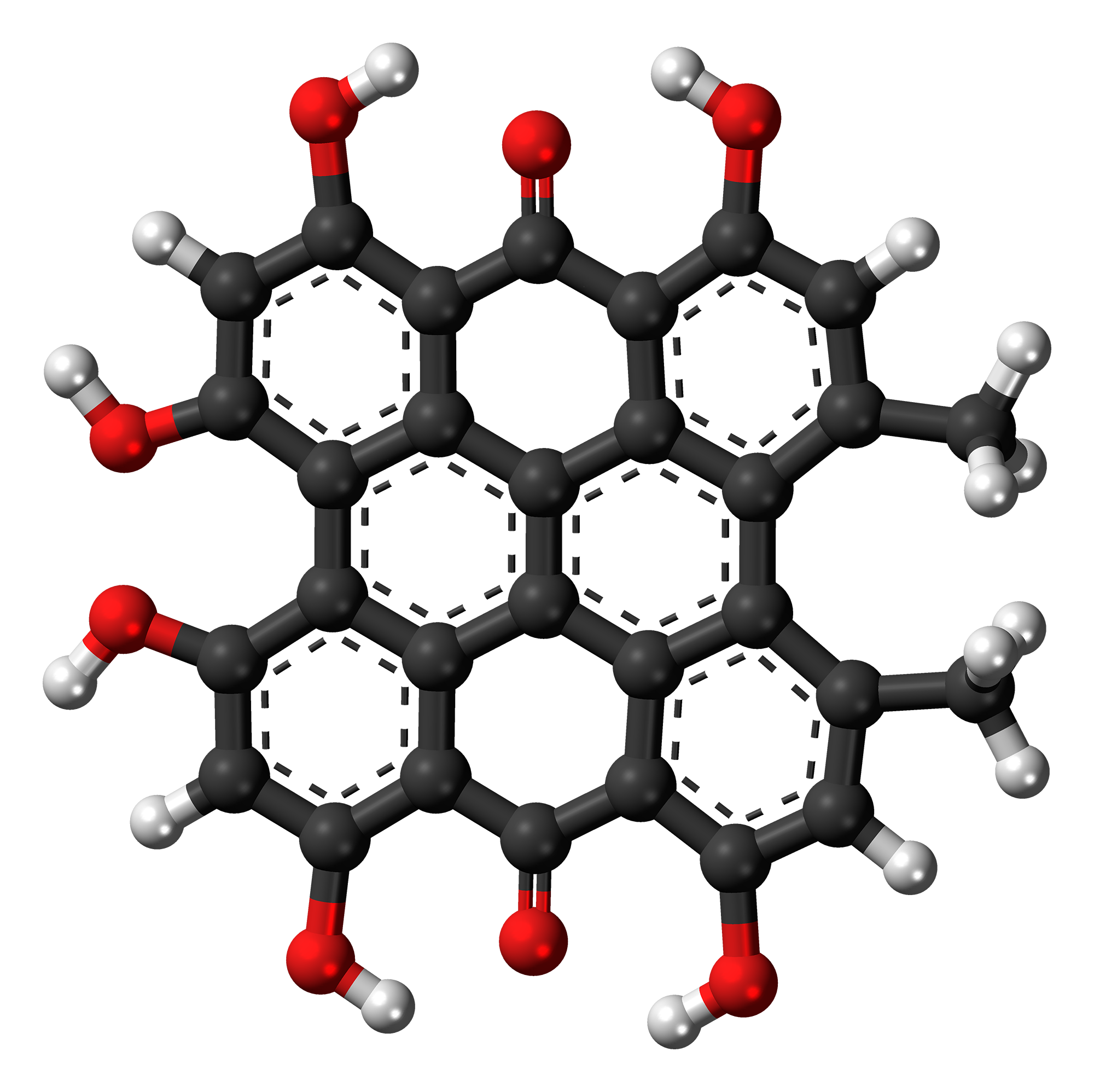

Names
- Preferred IUPAC name 1,3,4,6,8,13-Hexahydroxy-10,11-dimethylphenanthro[1,10,9,8-opqra]perylene-7,14-dione
- Other names 4,5,7,4',5',7'-Hexahydroxy-2,2'-dimethylnaphthodianthrone

Identifiers
| CAS Number | 548-04-9 |
| 3D model (JSmol) | Interactive image |
| ChEBI | CHEBI:5835 |
| ChEMBL | ChEMBL286494 |
| ChemSpider | 4444511 |
| ECHA InfoCard | 100.008.129 |
| KEGG | D12433; C07606 |
| PubChem CID | 5281051 |
| UNII | 7V2F1075HD |
| CompTox Dashboard (EPA) | DTXSID40203270 |
- InChI: InChI=1S/C30H16O8/c1-7-3-9(31)19-23-15(7)16-8(2)4-10(32)20-24(16)28-26-18(12(34)6-14(36)22(26)30(20)38)17-11(33)5-13(35)21(29(19)37)25(17)27(23)28/h3-6,31-36H,1-2H3 Key: BTXNYTINYBABQR-UHFFFAOYSA-N; InChI=1/C30H16O8/c1-7-3-9(31)19-23-15(7)16-8(2)4-10(32)20-24(16)28-26-18(12(34)6-14(36)22(26)30(20)38)17-11(33)5-13(35)21(29(19)37)25(17)27(23)28/h3-6,31-36H,1-2H3 Key: BTXNYTINYBABQR-UHFFFAOYAC
- SMILES: Cc0cc(O)c1C(=O)c2c(O)cc(O)c3c2c4c1c0c5c6c4c7c3c(O)cc(O)c7C(=O)c6c(O)cc5C

Properties
| Chemical formula | C_{30}H_{16}O_{8} |
| Molar mass | 504.450 g·mol^{−1} |
- Except where otherwise noted, data are given for materials in their standard state (at 25 °C [77 °F], 100 kPa). verify (what is ?) Infobox references

Hypericin is a carbopolycyclic compound derived from bisanthene with antidepressant properties, found in various Hypericum species, and is being studied for treating cutaneous T-cell lymphoma.

Opinions differ on the extent to which hypericin exhibits antidepressant effects. According to some scholars, hypericin, along with other active compounds in Hypericum perforatum (St. John’s wort), contributes to the antidepressant effects of the total plant extract. According to others, hypericin does not significantly inhibit monoamine oxidase and thus is unlikely to account for the antidepressant effects of Hypericum extract. Another hypericin shows affinity mainly for NMDA receptors, suggesting that other plant constituents likely play a more significant role in its antidepressant effects.

Hypericin is a structurally complex phenanthroperylene quinone with potential medical and photoreceptive applications. It is red-colored, photosensitive compound whose biosynthesis is catalyzed by the gene Hyp-1, a Bet v 1-class allergen identified through red-color-based colony screening and shown to convert emodin to hypericin with high efficiency. It is thought to be synthesized by the PR-10 protein Hyp-1 through emodin dimerization, but despite confirming Hyp-1’s structure and ligand-binding capability, its catalytic role in hypericin biosynthesis remains unproven.

Biotechnological research is exploring in vitro culture methods to enhance and stabilize the production of hypericin.
