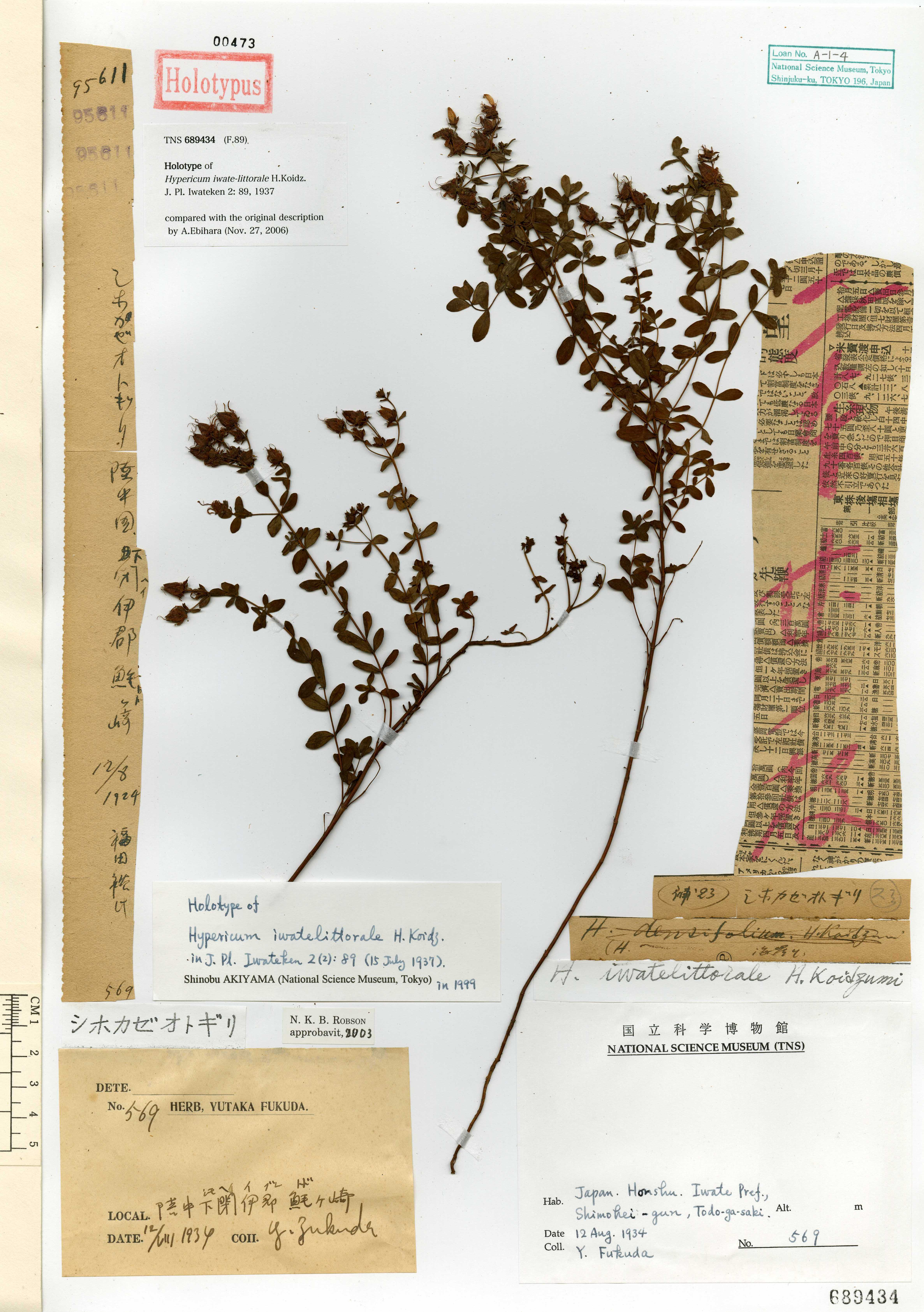
- Holotype of Hypericum iwatelittorale

Scientific classification
- Kingdom: Plantae
- Clade: Tracheophytes
- Clade: Angiosperms
- Clade: Eudicots
- Clade: Rosids
- Order: Malpighiales
- Family: Hypericaceae
- Genus: Hypericum
- Series: Hypericum ser. Hypericum
- Species: H. iwatelittorale

Binomial name
- Hypericum iwatelittorale H.Koidz.
- Approximate location of the type locality of H. iwatelittorale in Iwate Prefecture

= Hypericum iwatelittorale =

Species of flowering plant

Hypericum iwatelittorale, originally styled Hypericum iwate-littorale, is a species of flowering plant of the St John's wort family (Hypericaceae). Named for its habitat in the coastal regions of the Iwate Prefecture in Japan, the species is a small perennial herb with many small star-shaped flowers of bright yellow petals. It grows upright, with oval to elliptical leaves that are papery in texture and have an array of glands. Each flower has dozens of stamens, and the seeds are dark brown.

Described in 1937 by Japanese botanist Hideo Koidzumi, Hypericum iwatelittorale has at times been considered a synonym of H. pseudopetiolatum. However, it was accepted as a valid species in 2003 by English botanist Norman Robson. Robson placed the species into the type section of Hypericum, and noted its similarities to H. tosaense. While several conservation surveys have included the species, each classified it as data deficient and gave no assessment as to its status.

== Description ==
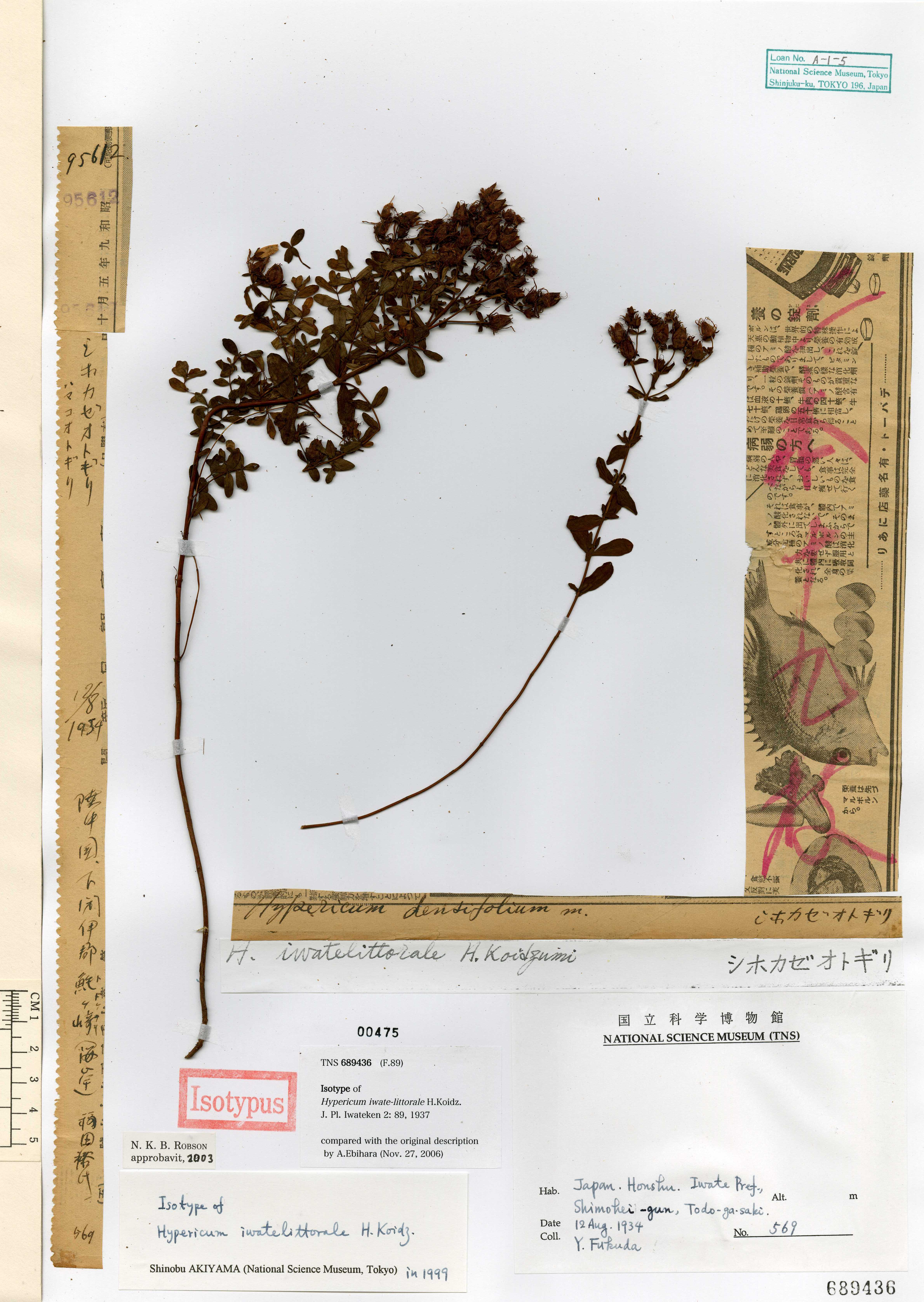
Isotype of Hypericum iwatelittorale

Hypericum iwatelittorale is a perennial herb that grows upright to a height of 25–32 centimeters (9.8–12.6 inches). The leaves on its lateral branches have petiolules, or leaflet stalks, which have a shape between that of an ellipse and a blunted lance. The flowers are 0.9–1.0 cm (0.35–0.39 in) wide, with five yellow petals each. The leaf-like sepals that support the flower are 0.3–0.4 cm (0.12–0.16 in) long and are pointed, with few or no glands on their edges.

The stems grow alone or in small groups, and have branches on their upper parts. They have two visible lines that run laterally and have black point-shaped glands. The internodes, or length of stem between leaf nodes, are usually longer than the leaves themselves. The leaves are directly attached to the main stem, or have a short leaf stalk when attached to the lateral branches. The leaf blade is 1.2–1.4 cm (0.47–0.55 in) long by 0.5–0.8 cm (0.20–0.31 in) wide, and is an oval to stretched-ellipse shape. The blades are a paler color on the undersides and have a papery texture. The leaf tip is rounded, the edges are smooth, and the base is blunt to rounded. There are dense, pale, point-shaped glands on the surface of the leaves, and black or reddish glands around the edges.

Each inflorescence, or flower cluster, has up to thirty flowers from as many as three primary nodes and four lower nodes. The cluster is in the shape of a corymb, with short pedicels (connections between the flower and stem) and small bracts (specialized leaves) that are lance-shaped. The flowers are 0.9–1.0 cm (0.35–0.39 in) wide and may be star-shaped. There are five sepals of roughly the same size: 0.3–0.4 cm (0.12–0.16 in) long and 0.1–0.2 cm (0.039–0.079 in) wide. These sepals are pointed and lance-shaped, with pale glands on their surface and few or no black glands on their edges. Each flower has five bright yellow petals that are 0.6–0.9 cm (0.24–0.35 in) long and have pale glands on their surface and very few black glands on their edges. There are around fifty stamens per flower, the longest of which is roughly 0.7 cm (0.28 in) long. The seed capsules are roughly oval-shaped, with oil valves that run longitudinally. The seeds are dark brown, 0.12 cm (0.047 in) long, and are cylindric in shape.

== Taxonomy ==
- Subsection Hypericum
  - Series Hypericum
    - H. scouleri
    - - - H. momoseanum
        - H. yezoense
      - H. attenuatum
        - H. iwatelittorale
        - H. tosaense
    - - H. perforatum
      - H. maculatum
    - - H. tetrapterum
      - H. triquetrifolium
      - H. undulatum
  - Series Senanensia

Cladogram showing the relationships between species of series Hypericum

The species was first collected in 1934 by Hideo Koidzumi, a Japanese botanist, and was originally described as Hypericum iwate-littorale in the Journal of Plants of Iwateken in 1937. Arika Kimura later doubted the validity of the species, and placed it as a synonym of H. pseudopetiolatum in subsection Erecta. In 2003, as a part of his monograph of the genus Hypericum, Norman Robson restored it to the status of valid species and standardized its name as Hypericum iwatelittorale. He also placed the species in series Hypericum (the type series of the type section Hypericum) because of its raised stem lines with gland dots. Robson noted the plant's similarities to H. tosaense, but decided that minor differences in appearance and wide separation geographically warranted its inclusion as a separate species. It is also closely related to H. momoseanum and H. yezoense.

=== Etymology ===
One origin of the genus name Hypericum is that it is derived from the Greek words hyper (above) and eikon (picture), in reference to the tradition of hanging the plant over religious icons in one's home. The specific epithet is made up of the combination of iwate, for the species' habitat in the Iwate Prefecture, and littorale, which derives from the Latin word litoralis and means "littoral" or "coastal". Its Japanese name is シオカゼオトギリ, transliterated as shio kaze otogiri. シオカゼ (shio kaze) can be translated as "sea breeze" and オトギリ(otogiri) refers to the genus Hypericum, giving the common name "sea breeze St. John's wort".

== Distribution and habitat ==
Hypericum iwatelittorale is found in temperate coastal regions of the Iwate Prefecture in Honshu, Japan. The holotype of the species was collected on the Omoe Peninsula in Shimohei District, and is now held at the Japanese National Museum of Nature and Science.

== Conservation ==
The conservation status of H. iwatelittorale was first surveyed by the Japanese Ministry of the Environment in 2012, but it was assessed as data deficient. The species is also considered data deficient by the Global Red List of Japanese Threatened Plants. The local Iwate Red Data Book evaluated threats to the species caused by the 2011 Tōhoku earthquake, and concluded that habitat loss due to natural disasters or road construction were the greatest risks. As of the 2020 Red Data assessment, it was still classified as having a "lack of information".
