= Hypericum yezoense =

Scientific classification
- Kingdom: Plantae
- Clade: Tracheophytes
- Clade: Angiosperms
- Clade: Eudicots
- Clade: Rosids
- Order: Malpighiales
- Family: Hypericaceae
- Genus: Hypericum
- Series: Hypericum ser. Hypericum
- Species: H. yezoense

Binomial name
- Hypericum yezoense Maxim.

Species of flowering plant

Hypericum yezoense, (Note: Also styled as Hypericum yezoënse) the Yezo St John's wort, is a species of flowering plant in the St John's wort family Hypericaceae. Native to Japan, Sakhalin, and the Kurils, the plant can be found among rocks and in grasslands. It is a perennial herb with many stems and small flower clusters. Several phytochemicals called yezo'otigirins have been isolated from the species, which have demonstrated anticancer and antimicrobial activity in a laboratory setting.

== Description ==
Hypericum yezoense is a perennial herb that usually grows 10–30 centimeters (4–12 in) tall. It is similar to H. momoseanum from central Honshu, but can be told apart by its separate distribution and the reduced size of its inflorescence.

=== Vegetative structures ===
Most of the time, the plant grows upright, but it sometimes grows outwards along the ground from a rooting base. It has many stems that normally grow in dense tufts, but are rarely solitary. The stems may or may not be branched, and have two lines running along their length that have black point-shaped glands. The internodes are 1.2–2.8 cm long, and the leaves are directly attached to the stems.

The leaf blades are 0.8–2.0 cm long by 0.3–0.9 cm wide. The uppermost leaves are ovate in shape, while lower ones are more lance-shaped or narrowly oblong. They are a slightly paler color on the underside and have a papery texture. The leaf tip is blunt to round, the edges are smooth, and the base is wedge-shaped and somewhat embraces the stem. There are two to three pairs of veins on the leaf. Most of the glands on the leaves are pale and point-shaped, but there are some that are black and point-shaped around the edges.

=== Flowering structures ===
The flower clusters (inflorescence) have 3–9 flowers from one or two nodes, creating a corymb-like or roughly pyramidal shape. The bracts are the same shape as the leaves, but somewhat smaller, and there are bracteoles that are 0.4–0.5 cm long and narrowly lance-shaped. The flowers themselves are 1.5–2.0 cm wide, and have petals arranged in a star shape. When budding, they are a narrow ovoid shape with a somewhat acute point. There are five sepals of varying lengths, 0.4–0.6 cm long and 0.1–0.2 cm wide. They are erect when the plant is budding and fruiting, and are a lance-like shape with an acute point and smooth edges. The sepals have three to five veins, and point-shaped glands that are mostly pale but rarely black. The flower has five pale yellow petals that are 0.8–1.2 cm long and 0.35–0.5 cm wide, roughly twice as large as the sepals. They are asymmetric, with mostly smooth edges. On the surface of the petals are pale glands while on the edges are irregularly spaced black glands.

There are around 30–50 stamens per flower, bundled into three fascicles. The longest stamens are 0.8–1.0 cm long, just shorter than the petals, and all have a black anther gland. The ovary is three-celled and measures 0.30–0.32 cm long and 0.15–0.20 cm wide. There are three free styles, and the stigmas have a narrow rounded head. The seed capsule is 0.5–0.8 cm long by 0.3–0.4 cm wide, and is an ovoid shape with valves along its length. The seeds inside are dark brown and are a 0.1–0.13 cm long cylinder.

=== Chemistry ===
Several new monoterpene phytochemicals have been isolated from the aboveground parts of H. yezoense. There were classified as yezo'otigirins, and the first three (A–C) were shown to have a unique natural ring structure, and may be derived from a hyperforin analogue. Yezo’otogirins D–F were found to be acylphloroglucinols while G and H are also monoterpenes. Its microelement content was assayed in 2012, and it was found to have 109 milligrams of iron per kilogram of dry weight, 36 mg of manganese per kg, 20 mg of zinc per kg, 6.4 mg of copper per kg, and 15 mg of nickel per kg.

== Etymology ==
One origin of the genus name Hypericum is that it is derived from the Greek words hyper (above) and eikon (picture), in reference to the tradition of hanging the plant over religious icons in the home. Its Japanese name is エゾオトギリ which can be transliterated as yezo otogiri and means Yezo St John's wort.

== Taxonomy ==
- Subsection Hypericum
  - Series Hypericum
    - H. scouleri
    - - - H. momoseanum
        - H. yezoense
      - H. attenuatum
        - H. iwatelittorale
        - H. tosaense
    - - H. perforatum
      - H. maculatum
    - - H. tetrapterum
      - H. triquetrifolium
      - H. undulatum
  - Series Senanensia

Cladogram showing the relationships between species of series Hypericum

Hypericum yezoense was originally described by Karl Maximovich in 1886. Robert Keller described plants of the species from Yezo as H. mororanense and H. procumbens in 1897, and as H. ologanthemum in 1904. Auctore Léveillé and Eugène Vaniot named H. porphyrandrum based on a specimen from Sakhalin with distinct filiform styles and dark purple anther glands, but this was later determined to be a synonym. Japanese botanist Hideo Koidzumi authored the synonyms H. pseduonikkoense and H. yoitiense in 1937.

In 2002, British botanist Norman Robson analyzed the crown series of Hypericum as a part of his monograph on the genus, and placed H. yezoense as a member of this series Hypericum. Robson informally grouped H. tosaense, H. iwatelittorale, and H. momoseanum into a "derivative Japanese H. yezoense group" within the series.

== Distribution and habitat ==
Hypericum yezoense is found in temperate regions from south Sakhalin to northern Japan, and on the Kuril Islands. The species was once recorded in Korea, but later analysis by Arika Kimura found this to be erroneous. Its habitat is are rocky or grassy places in the mountains and by the sea.

== Research ==
Phytochemicals isolated from Hypericum yezoense have exhibited various effects in a laboratory setting. Yezo’otogirin C showed moderate cytotoxicity against human cancer cell lines; yezo’otogirin E had antimicrobial effects against Escherichia coli and Staphylococcus aureus; yezo’otogirins G and H had some antimicrobial activity against Bacillus subtilis and Trichophyton mentagrophytes.
