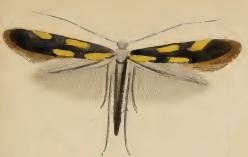

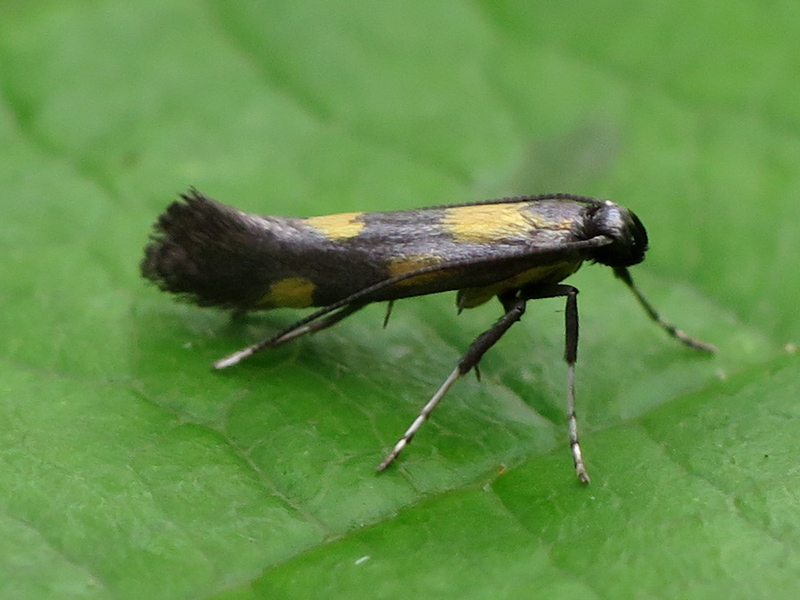

Scientific classification
- Kingdom: Animalia
- Phylum: Arthropoda
- Clade: Pancrustacea
- Class: Insecta
- Order: Lepidoptera
- Family: Gracillariidae
- Genus: Euspilapteryx
- Species: E. auroguttella

Binomial name
- Euspilapteryx auroguttella Stephens, 1835

Synonyms
- Eucalybites auroguttella (Stephens, 1835)

= Euspilapteryx auroguttella =

Species of moth

Euspilapteryx auroguttella is a moth of the family Gracillariidae. It resides across Europe.

== Description ==
The wingspan is 9–10 mm. Antennae have a white apex. The forewings are dark fuscous and purplish- tinged. Roundish spots appear below costa at 1/3, on costa at 2/3, and two on dorsum near base and before tornus bright yellow. Hindwings are grey. The larva is whitish-green; dorsal line greener; the head is pale yellow-brown.

== Ecology ==
Adults are on wing in May and August in two generations.

The larvae feed on Hypericum adenotrichum, Hypericum elegans, Hypericum hircinum, Hypericum hirsutum, Hypericum humifusum, Hypericum maculatum, Hypericum montanum, Hypericum olympicum, Hypericum perforatum, Hypericum rhodoppeum and Hypericum tetrapterum. They mine the leaves of their host plant.

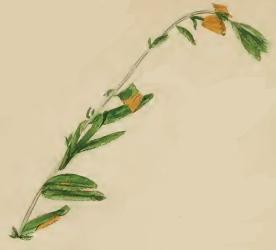
A sprig of Hypericum with leaves mined and rolled into cones

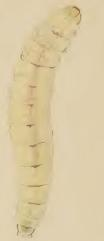
Larva
