= Hypericum foveolatum =

Scientific classification
- Kingdom: Plantae
- Clade: Tracheophytes
- Clade: Angiosperms
- Clade: Eudicots
- Clade: Rosids
- Order: Malpighiales
- Family: Hypericaceae
- Genus: Hypericum
- Species: †H. foveolatum

Binomial name
- †Hypericum foveolatum Dorof.

Extinct species of flowering plant

Hypericum foveolatum is an extinct species of the genus Hypericum. The paleospecies is known from more recent fossils than many other Hypericum specimens, with fossilized seeds from the Pliocene epoch being found in Russia and Belarus. These seeds have been compared to numerous extant species, including H. elegans, H. tetrapterum, H. attenuatum, H. kamtschaticum, H. yezoënse, H. nudiflorum, and H. microsepalum. However, none of these similar species have the exact same kind of testa surface cells as H. foveolatum.
