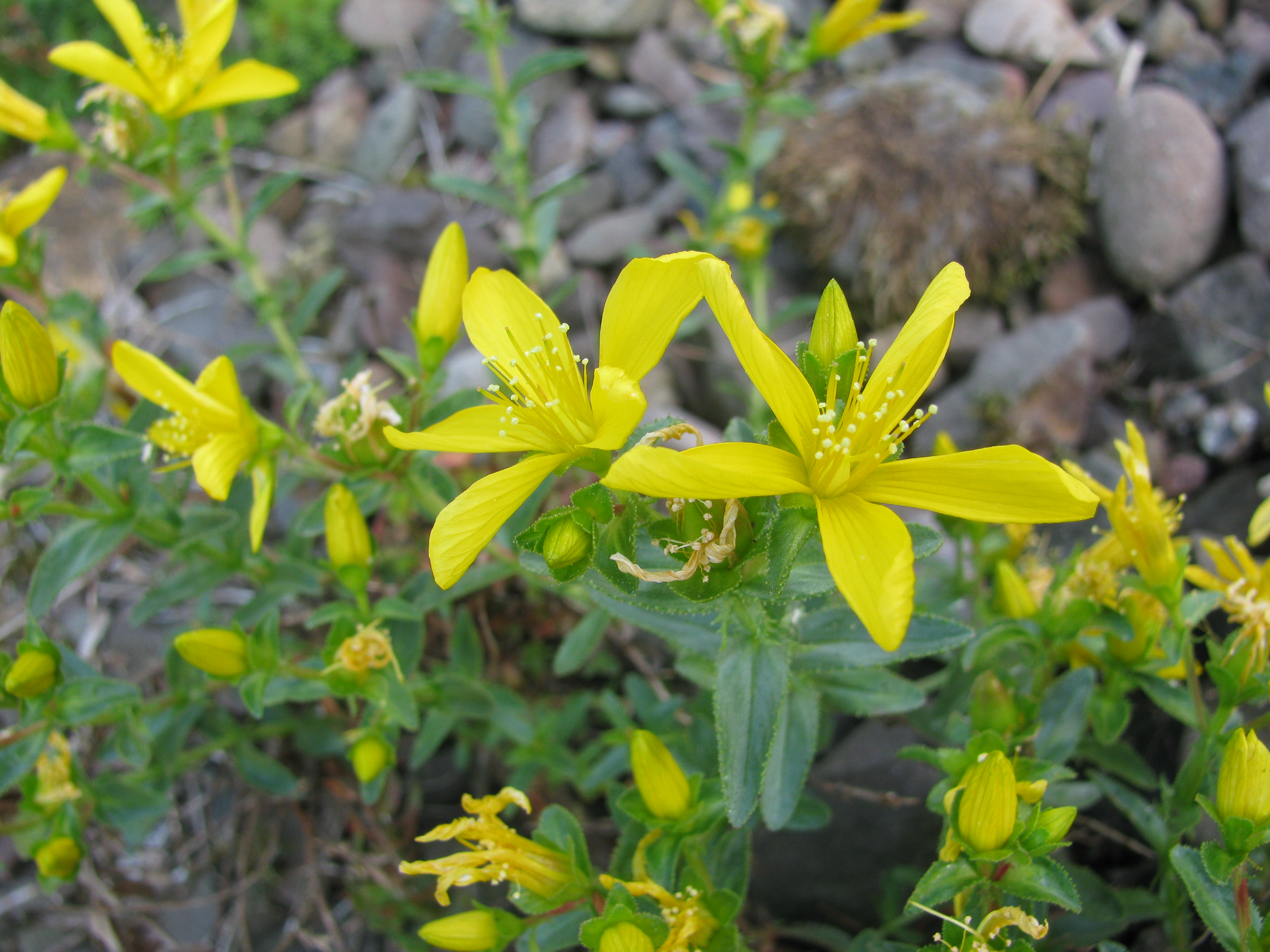
- Hypericum orientale at the Royal Botanic Garden Edinburgh

Scientific classification
- Kingdom: Plantae
- Clade: Tracheophytes
- Clade: Angiosperms
- Clade: Eudicots
- Clade: Rosids
- Order: Malpighiales
- Family: Hypericaceae
- Genus: Hypericum
- Section: H. sect. Crossophyllum
- Species: H. orientale

Binomial name
- Hypericum orientale L.

= Hypericum orientale =

Species of flowering plant

Hypericum orientale, the Ptarmic-leafed St. John's wort or Eastern St. John's wort, is a flowering plant in the family Hypericaceae. It is distributed across northern Turkey, Georgia, the Caucasus, and Dagestan. The species can be found on stony sloped amidst volcanic rocks in the mountains and in light woodlands at elevations of up to 2,300 m (7,500 ft). It flowers from May to June and July to August. The plant has small, bright yellow flowers and grows across the ground in a creeping pattern. It prefers full sun and is ideal for rock gardens, and is hardy down to -30°F.

== Description ==
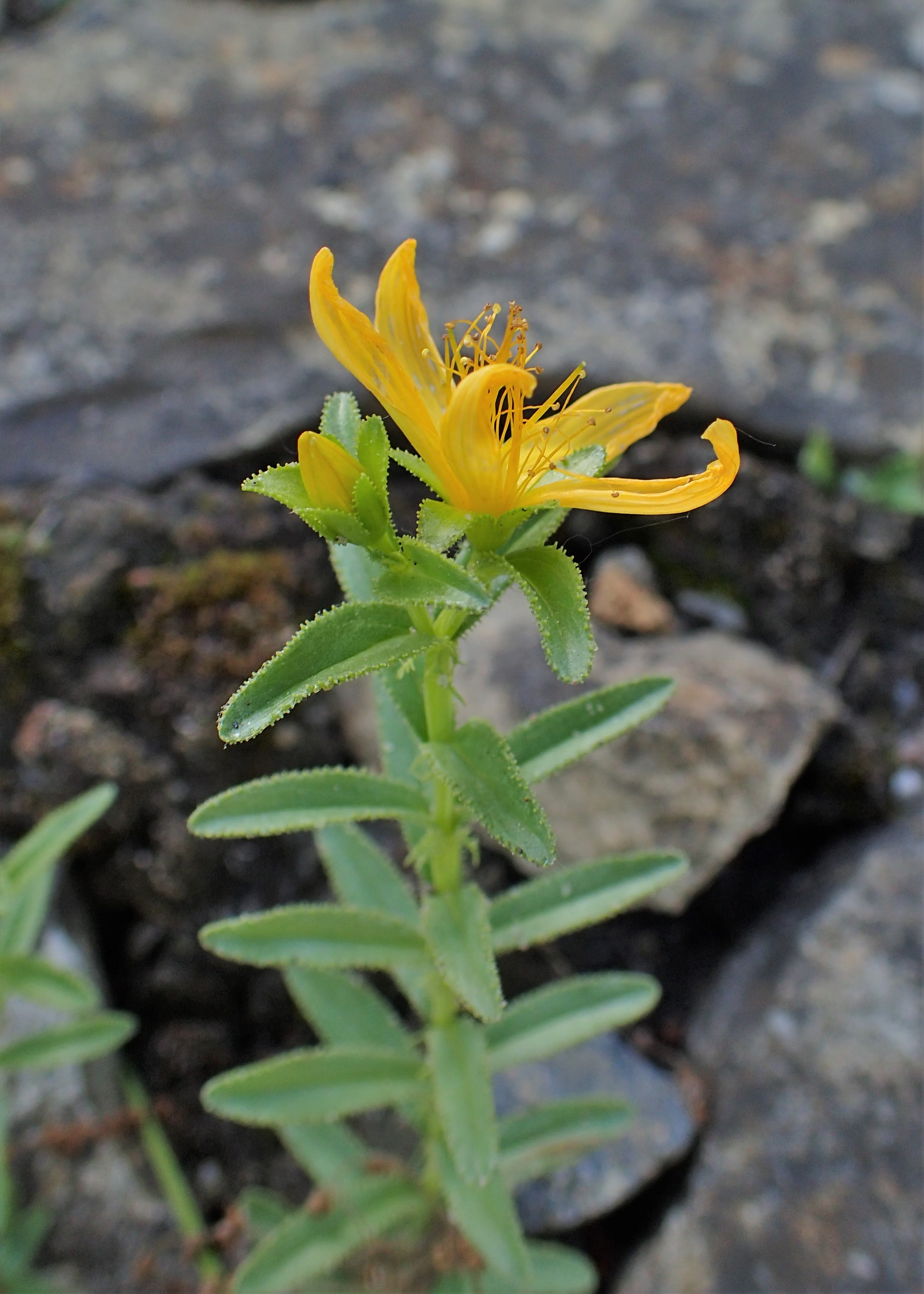
A single inflorescence

Hypericum orientale is a small perennial herb that is 7–45 cm (2.8 in – 1 ft 5.7 in) tall. It grows both along the ground and upright, and is sometimes rooting at its base. There are many stems that spread and branch from a taproot, but that do not continue to branch out closer to the inflorescence. The stems are 2-lined and either lack glands or have a few reddish glands which are scattered or in lines.

The leaves are directly connected to the stem and are angled slightly upwards. The leaf blade is 1–4 cm (0.39–1.57 in) long by 0.2–1 cm (0.079–0.39 in) wide, and their shape is between a narrow oval and an oval lance. They are the same color as the rest of the plant, and have a papery texture and rounded point. The edges of the blade have shallow glands and a denticulate (finely toothed) texture, while the base is wedge-shaped with pairs of auricles. The glands on the leaf are pale and point-shaped, and those on the edges are on the denticuli (fine teeth).

Each inflorescence has around three flowers from one to three nodes. There are often additional flowering branches from a further one to three nodes below the inflorescence. The whole structure can be shaped between an inverse pyramid and a cylinder. The bracts are similar in shape to the regular leaves but are fringed with glands. Each flower is around 4 cm (1.6 in) in diameter; their buds are ellipse-shaped and round on the end. The sepals are of varying lengths and barely overlap, measuring 0.4–0.7 cm (0.16–0.28 in) long by 0.2–0.5 cm (0.079–0.20 in) wide. The petals are bright yellow, without any red tinge. They measure 1–1.8 cm (0.39–0.71 in) long by 0.2–0.4 cm (0.079–0.16 in) wide, and there are around 2.5 times as many petals as there are sepals. there are between thirty and forty-five stamens, the longest of which are 0.7–1.3 cm (0.28–0.51 in) long. They have an amber colored anther gland on the end. The ovaries are narrowly oval-shaped; there are around twice as many styles as there are ovaries. The seed capsule is 0.8–1.1 cm (0.31–0.43 in) long and 0.3–0.5 cm (0.12–0.20 in) wide with many grooves. The seeds are a mid brown color; they are 0.1–0.15 cm (0.039–0.059 in) long.

=== Phytochemistry ===
Compared to other more studied Hypericum species, H. orientale is not particularly dense in notable chemical constituents. It entirely lacks hypericin, and has only trace amounts of pseudohypericin and rutin. Hyperoside is the largest constituent, and chlorogenic acid and quercitrin are also present in meaningful amounts.

== Taxonomy ==
Hypericum orientale is a species in the small section Hypericum sect. Crossophyllum. The genus name Hypericum derives from the Greek words hyper, meaning above, and eikon, meaning picture. This refers to the practice of hanging the flower "above pictures" to ward off evil spirits. The specific epithet orientale refers to the species' distribution in "the East" or from "the Orient". The placement of the species within Hypericum can be summarized as follows:

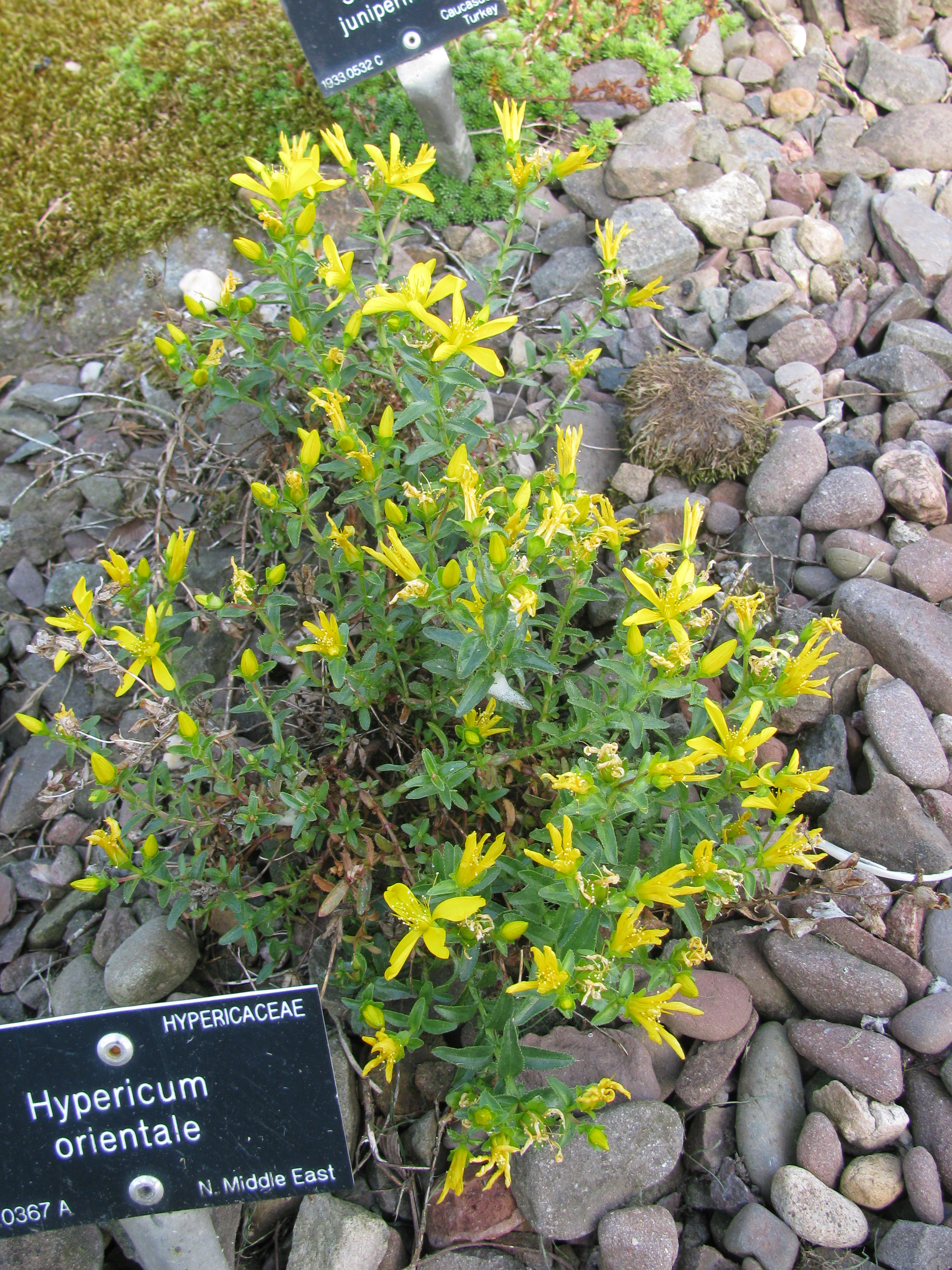
Full plant in stony habitat

Hypericum

Hypericum subg. Hypericum

Hypericum sect. Crossophyllum

H. adenotrichum
H. aucheri
H. orientale
H. thasium

=== History ===
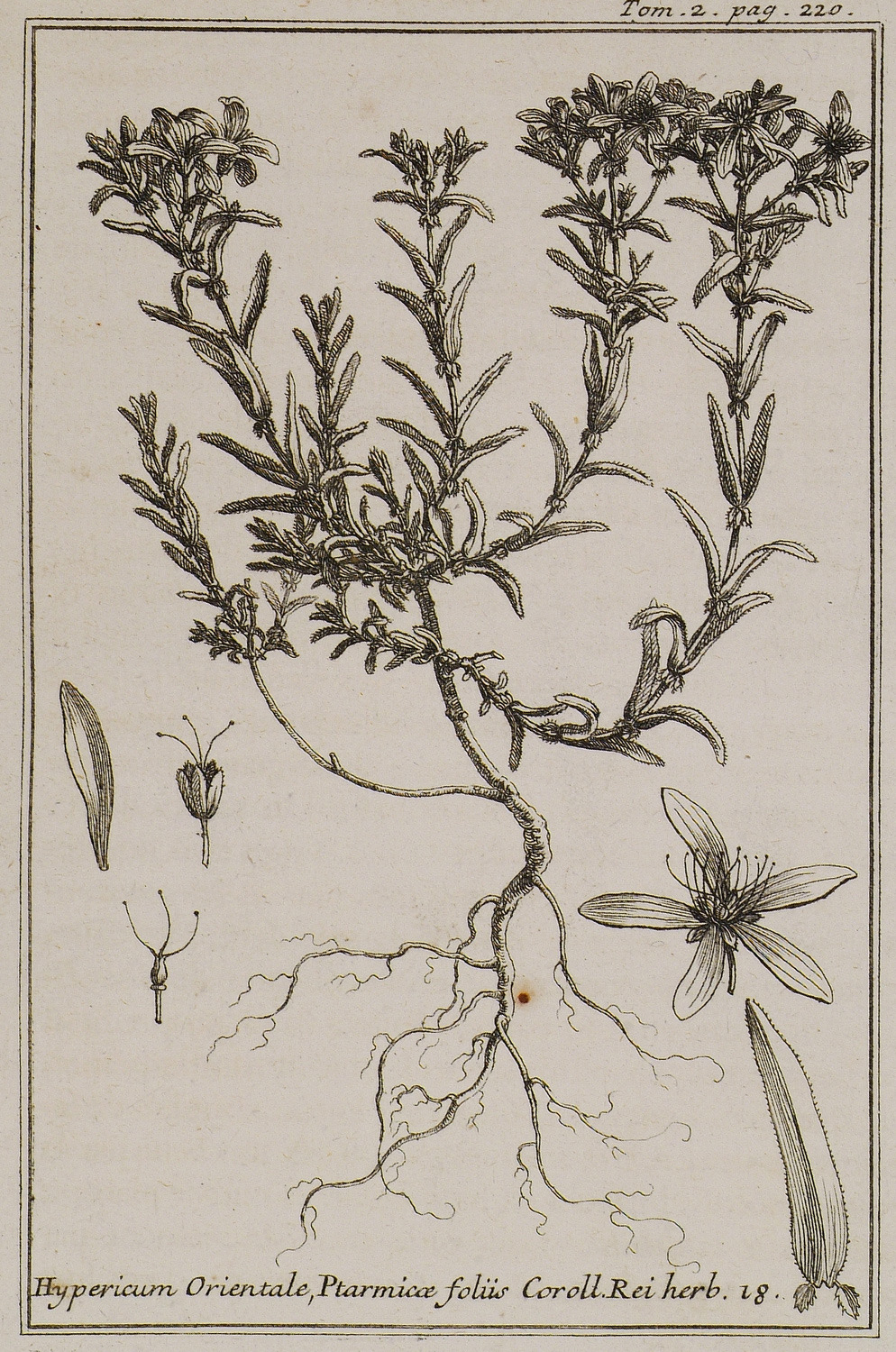
Illustration of H. orientale from a 1717 travelogue

While Hypericum orientale was known before the modern system of taxonomy was established, it was first formally described by Carolus Linnaeus in the second volume of Species Plantarum in 1753. Linnaeus gave the following brief description for the plant:

Hypericum floribus trigynis, stipulis reflexis ovatis crenatis. Ptarmicae follis. Habitat in Oriente.
Hypericum with three-flowered inflorescence, oval-shaped crenate reflexed stalks. Ptarmic leaves. Habitat in the East.

In 1836 and 1842, Hippolyte Jaubert and Édouard Spach described three species that overlapped with the range of Hypericum orientale. H. tournefortii was found in Turkey and western Georgia, H. ptarmicaefolium throughout the range, and H. jaubertii at higher altitudes and poorer habitats. Each plant had slightly different growth patterns and leaf shapes, which Jaubert and Spach used to justify their status as species. However, in Norman Robson's 2010 volume of his monograph on the genus Hypericum, it was demonstrated that all three descriptions could develop from offspring of a single plant put under different conditions. As such, H. tournefortii was demoted to H. orientale var. teberdinum and H. ptarmicaefolium was demoted to H. orientale var. adzharicum.

=== Synonyms ===
The following are specific-level synonyms listed by Plants of the World Online:

Name	Author	Year	Journal		
Name	Author	Year	Title	Vol.	Page
Hypericum adsharicum	(Woron.) A.P.Kholkhoyakov	1991	Byull. Moskovsk. Obshch. Isp. Prir.	96	108
Hypericum buschianum	(Woronow) Grossh.	1932	Fl. Kavkaza	3	66
Hypericum decussatum	Kunze	1848	Index Seminum (LZ, Lipsiensis)		2
Hypericum jaubertii	Spach	1842	Ill. Pl. Orient.	1	38
Hypericum ptarmicaefolium	Spach	1836	Histoire naturelle des végétaux	5	404
Hypericum tournefortii	Spach	1836	Histoire naturelle des végétaux	5	404

== Uses ==
Parts of Hypericum orientale are edible, and it has been recorded as being used in folk medicine. In Turkey, a decoction of the plant has been used to treat hemorrhoids, and it has also been used as a sedative.
