= Hypericum lycium =

Scientific classification
- Kingdom: Plantae
- Clade: Tracheophytes
- Clade: Angiosperms
- Clade: Eudicots
- Clade: Rosids
- Order: Malpighiales
- Family: Hypericaceae
- Genus: Hypericum
- Section: Hypericum sect. Olympia
- Species: H. lycium

Binomial name
- Hypericum lycium (N.Robson & Hub.-Mor.) N.Robson

Synonyms
- Hypericum polyphyllum subsp. lycium N.Robson & Hub.-Mor.

Species of flowering plant in the St John's wort family

Hypericum lycium is a species of flowering plant in the family Hypericaceae which is endemic to Turkey.
