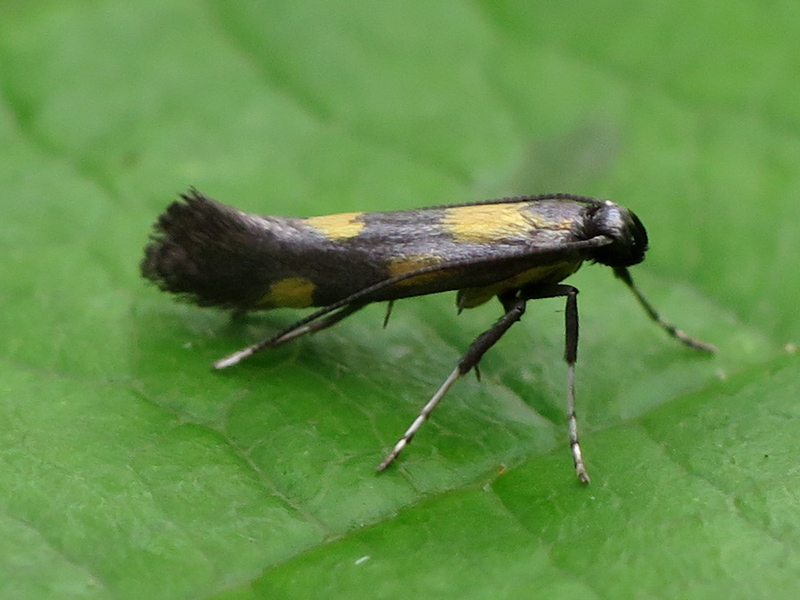
- Euspilapteryx auroguttella

Scientific classification
- Domain: Eukaryota
- Kingdom: Animalia
- Phylum: Arthropoda
- Class: Insecta
- Order: Lepidoptera
- Family: Gracillariidae
- Subfamily: Gracillariinae
- Genus: Euspilapteryx; Stephens, 1835

= Euspilapteryx =

Genus of moths

Euspilapteryx is a genus of moths in the family Gracillariidae.

== Species ==
- Euspilapteryx auroguttella Stephens, 1835
- Euspilapteryx crypta Vári, 1961
