= Euspilapteryx crypta =

Scientific classification
- Kingdom: Animalia
- Phylum: Arthropoda
- Class: Insecta
- Order: Lepidoptera
- Family: Gracillariidae
- Genus: Euspilapteryx
- Species: E. crypta

Binomial name
- Euspilapteryx crypta Vári, 1961

Species of moth

Euspilapteryx crypta is a moth of the family Gracillariidae. It is known from South Africa.
