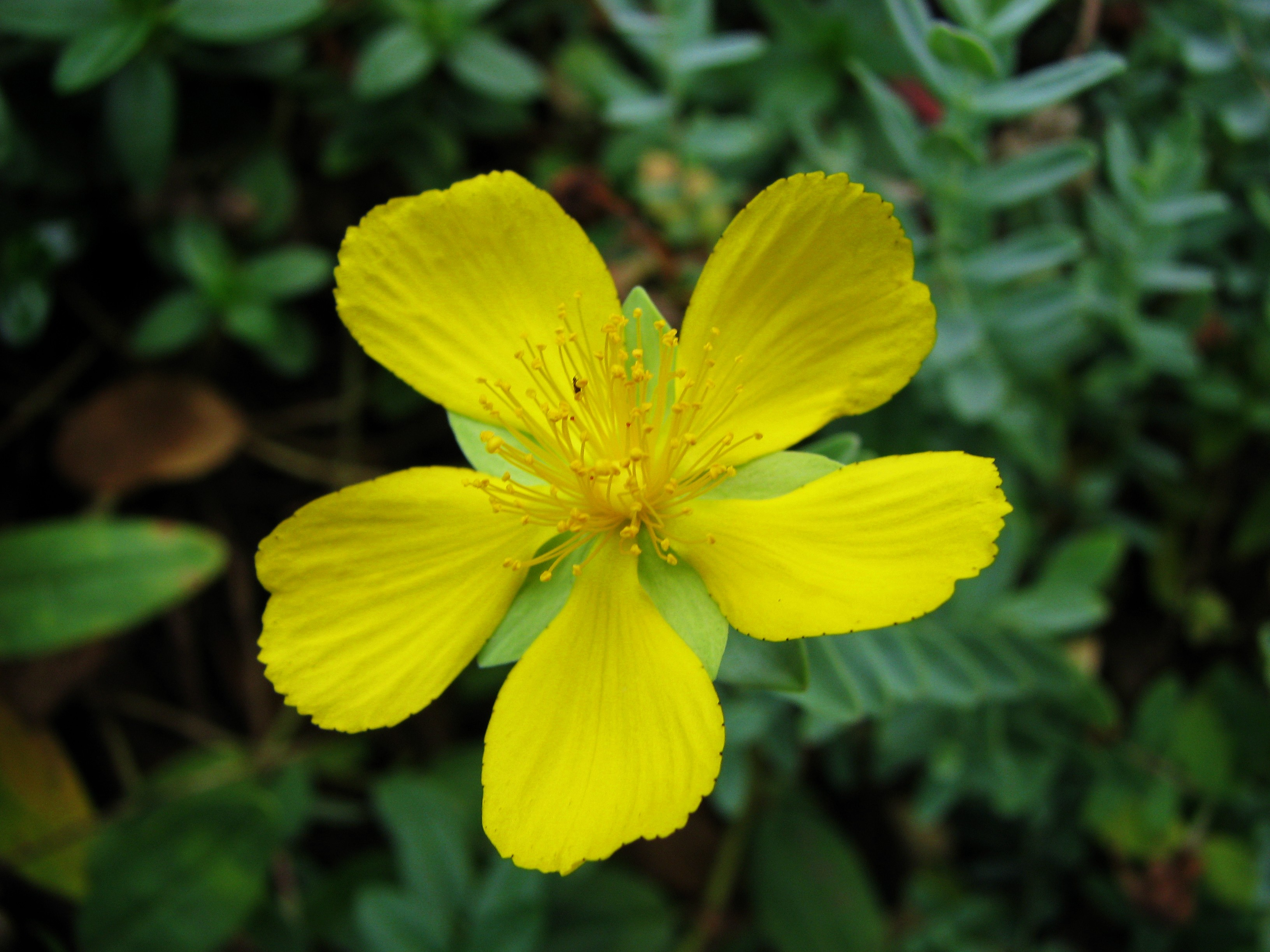
- H. olympicum at the University of Wrocław Botanical Garden, Poland

Scientific classification
- Kingdom: Plantae
- Clade: Tracheophytes
- Clade: Angiosperms
- Clade: Eudicots
- Clade: Rosids
- Order: Malpighiales
- Family: Hypericaceae
- Genus: Hypericum
- Section: Hypericum sect. Olympia (Spach) Nyman

Type species
- Hypericum olympicum Jaub. & Spach

Species
- Hypericum auriculatum (N. Robson & Hub.-Mor.) N. Robson; Hypericum lycium (N. Robson & Hub.-Mor.) N. Robson; Hypericum olympicum L.; Hypericum polyphyllum Boiss. & Balansa

= Hypericum sect. Olympia =

Group of flowering plants

Olympia is one of 36 sections in the genus Hypericum. It contains four species and its type species is H. olympicum.
