= Hypericum microsepalum =

Scientific classification
- Kingdom: Plantae
- Clade: Tracheophytes
- Clade: Angiosperms
- Clade: Eudicots
- Clade: Rosids
- Order: Malpighiales
- Family: Hypericaceae
- Genus: Hypericum
- Species: H. microsepalum

Binomial name
- Hypericum microsepalum (Torr. & A. Gray) A. Gray ex. S. Watson

Species of plant

Hypericum microsepalum, commonly known as flatwoods St. John's wort, is an evergreen, arborescent plant native found along coastal ecoclines in the Florida panhandle.

== Description ==
Hypericum microsepalum are usually glabrous herbs or shrubs characterized by simple, opposite, entire leaves that are often punctate and typically sessile or subsessile. The leaves lack stipules. Inflorescences are primarily cymose, with perfect, regular flowers that are bracteate and either subsessile or borne on short pedicels. Flowers have 2, 4, or 5 persistent sepals and 4 or 5 petals, which are usually yellow or pink and often marcescent. Stamens number from 5 to many and are either free or fused at the base into 3–5 clusters, with persistent filaments. The ovary is superior and composed of 2–5 carpels; styles and stigmas may be free or fused. The ovary may be 1-locular or partially to fully divided into 2–5 locules, with axile or parietal placentation. The fruit is a capsule, typically ovoid and dehiscing longitudinally, with persistent styles. Seeds are numerous, shiny, and either cylindric or oblong with an areolate surface texture.

== Distribution and habitat ==
Hypericum microsepalum is found from southern Georgia and southeastern Alabama south to panhandle Florida. It grows in moist to wet pine flatwoods. It can also be found in dry upland pine savannas where fire occurs every 2-3 years.

== Ecology ==
It flowers from February through May. The dehiscent, septicidal capsules contain numerous seeds, which are dispersed by gravity and occasionally by birds. The plant has a lifespan of about 10 years with a persistent seed bank.
