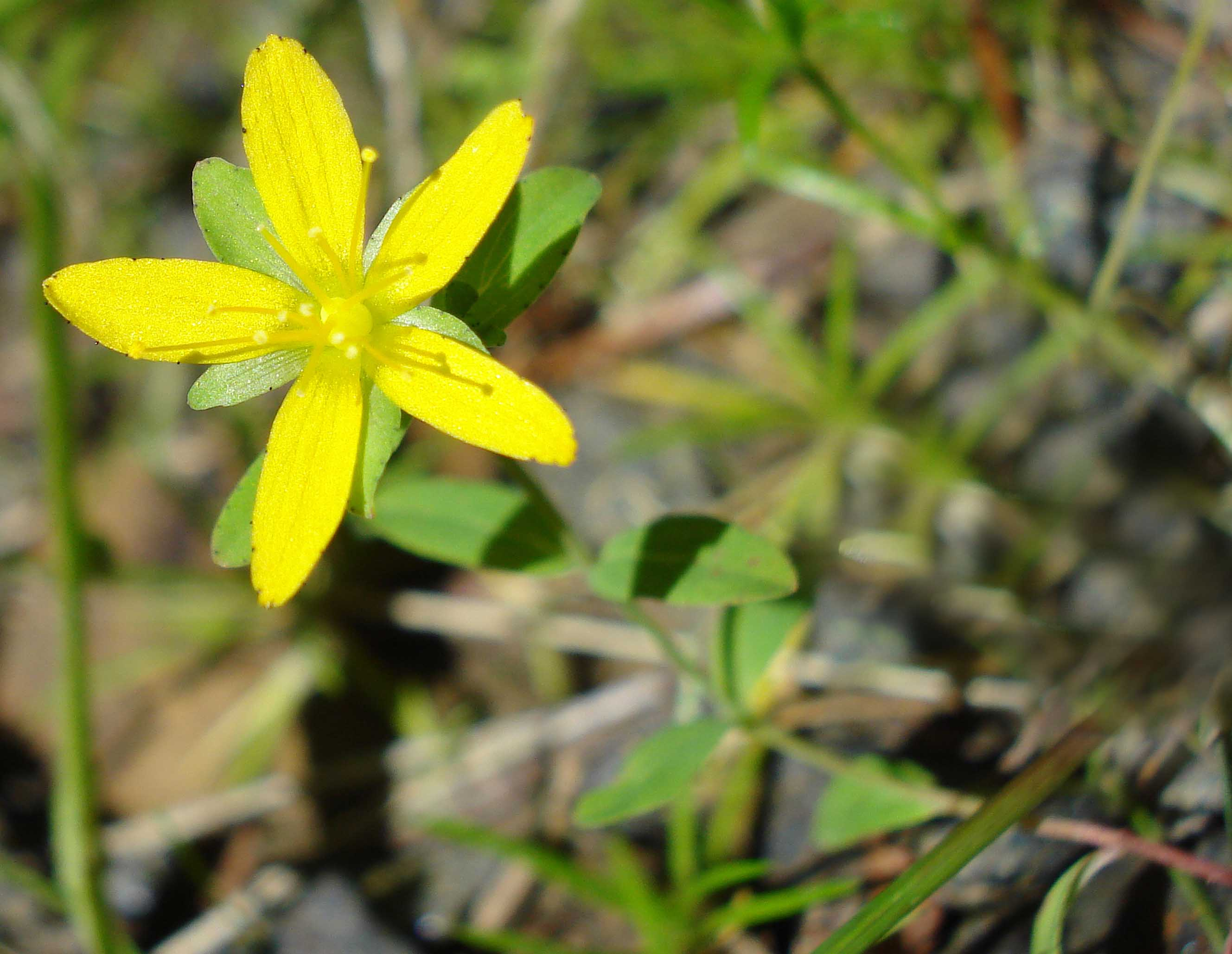

Scientific classification
- Kingdom: Plantae
- Clade: Tracheophytes
- Clade: Angiosperms
- Clade: Eudicots
- Clade: Rosids
- Order: Malpighiales
- Family: Hypericaceae
- Genus: Hypericum
- Section: Hypericum sect. Oligostema
- Species: H. humifusum

Binomial name
- Hypericum humifusum L.

= Hypericum humifusum =

Species of flowering plant in the St John's wort family

Hypericum humifusum is a prostrate flowering plant in the St. John's wort family Hypericaceae commonly known as trailing St John's-wort. It is found in Western Europe.

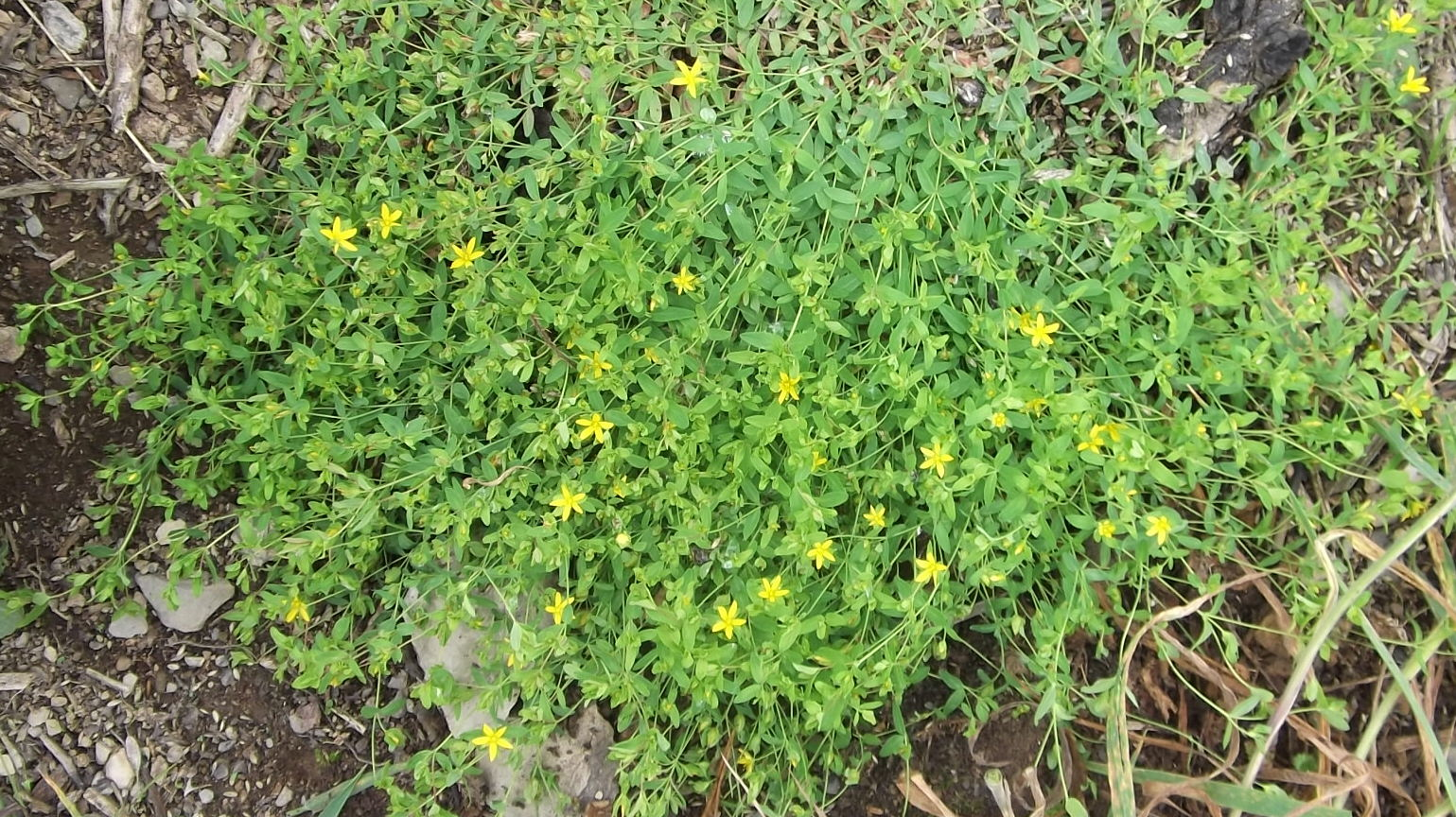
Hypericum humifusum

== Description ==
Hypericum humifusum is a low-growing, hairless perennial. The thin trailing stems have two raised lines and bear opposite pairs of pale green elongated oval leaves, often with tiny translucent glands. The undersides of the leaves have tiny black dots on the edges. The flowers are about 1 cm (0.3 in) across and grow from the leaf axils. There are five sepals of unequal size and five yellow petals, often with a few black dots, and not much larger in size than the sepals. The stamens are united at the base into bundles. The fruits are dry.

== Habitat ==
Hypericum humifusum grows on heaths, dry banks, bare land at the edge of tracks and light woodland. It is found in Western Europe and throughout the British Isles where it flowers from May to September.
