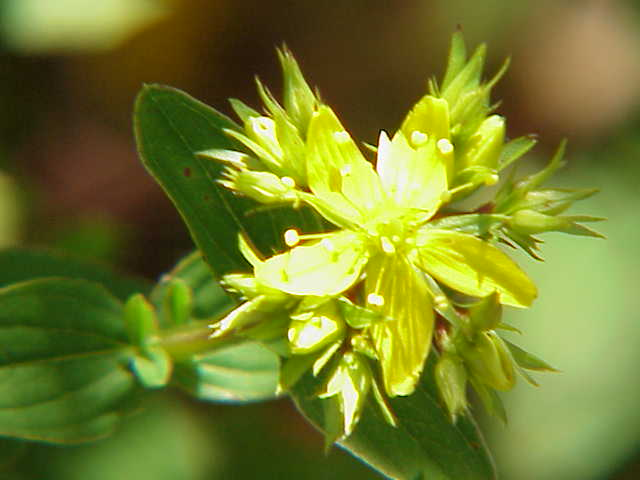

Scientific classification
- Kingdom: Plantae
- Clade: Tracheophytes
- Clade: Angiosperms
- Clade: Eudicots
- Clade: Rosids
- Order: Malpighiales
- Family: Hypericaceae
- Genus: Hypericum
- Section: Hypericum sect. Hypericum
- Species: H. elegans

Binomial name
- Hypericum elegans Steph. ex Willd.

= Hypericum elegans =

Species of flowering plant in the St John's wort family

Hypericum elegans is a species of flowering plant in the St. John's wort family Hypericaceae. It is native to Europe.

The larvae of the moth Euspilapteryx auroguttella feed on H. elegans.

== See also ==
- List of Hypericum species
