= Hypericum polyphyllum =

Scientific classification
- Kingdom: Plantae
- Clade: Tracheophytes
- Clade: Angiosperms
- Clade: Eudicots
- Clade: Rosids
- Order: Malpighiales
- Family: Hypericaceae
- Genus: Hypericum
- Section: Hypericum sect. Olympia
- Species: H. polyphyllum

Binomial name
- Hypericum polyphyllum Boiss. & Balansa

Synonyms
- Hypericum macrocalyx Freyn; Hypericum olympicum f. macrocalyx (Freyn) N.Robson

Species of flowering plant in the St John's wort family

Hypericum polyphyllum is a species of flowering plant in the family Hypericaceae which is native to Turkey, Lebanon, and Syria.
