= Hypericum momoseanum =

Scientific classification
- Kingdom: Plantae
- Clade: Tracheophytes
- Clade: Angiosperms
- Clade: Eudicots
- Clade: Rosids
- Order: Malpighiales
- Family: Hypericaceae
- Genus: Hypericum
- Subgenus: Hypericum subg. Hypericum
- Section: Hypericum sect. Hypericum
- Subsection: Hypericum subsect. Hypericum
- Series: Hypericum ser. Hypericum
- Species: H. momoseanum

Binomial name
- Hypericum momoseanum Makino

Species of flowering plant

Hypericum tosaense is a species of flowering plant of the St John's wort family (Hypericaceae).
