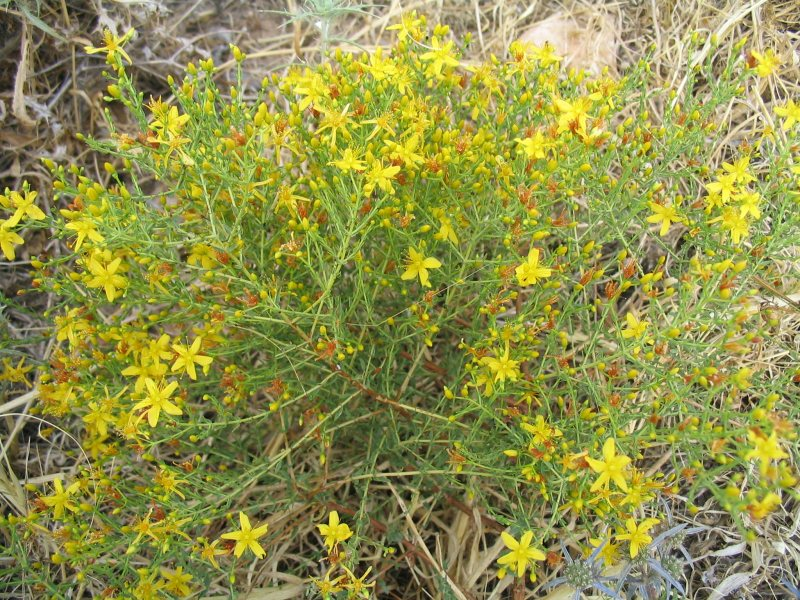

Scientific classification
- Kingdom: Plantae
- Clade: Tracheophytes
- Clade: Angiosperms
- Clade: Eudicots
- Clade: Rosids
- Order: Malpighiales
- Family: Hypericaceae
- Genus: Hypericum
- Series: Hypericum ser. Hypericum
- Species: H. triquetrifolium

Binomial name
- Hypericum triquetrifolium Turra

= Hypericum triquetrifolium =

Species of flowering plant in the St John's wort family

Hypericum triquetrifolium, commonly called curled-leaved St. John's-wort, is a species of plant of the family Hypericaceae. It is native to the Mediterranean Basin.
