= Hypericum tosaense =

Scientific classification
- Kingdom: Plantae
- Clade: Tracheophytes
- Clade: Angiosperms
- Clade: Eudicots
- Clade: Rosids
- Order: Malpighiales
- Family: Hypericaceae
- Genus: Hypericum
- Series: Hypericum ser. Hypericum
- Species: H. tosaense

Binomial name
- Hypericum tosaense Makino

Species of plant

Hypericum tosaense is a species of flowering plant of the St John's wort family (Hypericaceae).
