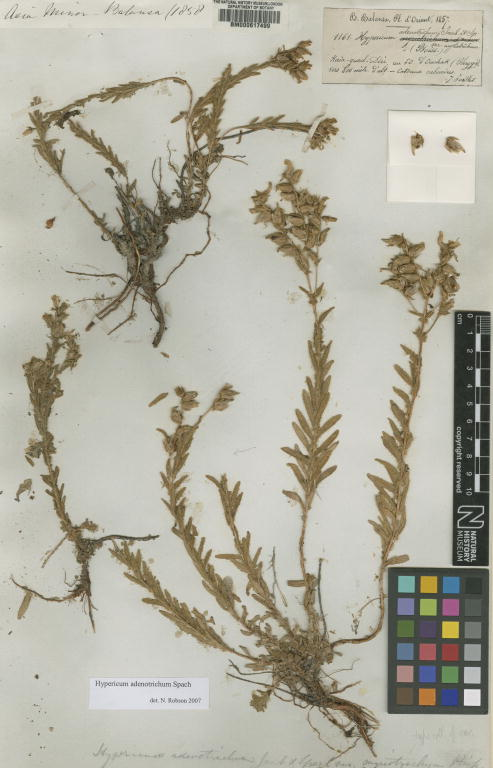

Scientific classification
- Kingdom: Plantae
- Clade: Tracheophytes
- Clade: Angiosperms
- Clade: Eudicots
- Clade: Rosids
- Order: Malpighiales
- Family: Hypericaceae
- Genus: Hypericum
- Section: H. sect. Crossophyllum
- Species: H. adenotrichum

Binomial name
- Hypericum adenotrichum Spach 1836

= Hypericum adenotrichum =

Species of flowering plant in the St John's wort family

Hypericum adenotrichum, commonly known as kantaron, is a species of perennial flowering plant in the family Hypericaceae. It is native to Turkey.

== Description ==
Hypericum adenotrichum is a small plant, ranging 7–32 cm (2.8–12.6 in) in height. It has numerous spreading stems with sessile, linear to oblanceolate leaves. Its flowerheads have 3 to 7 (occasionally up to 23) flowers, each flower averaging 33 mm (1.3 in) across. The flowers have bright yellow petals, sometimes tinged with red, with up to 30 stamens.

== Distribution and habitat ==
The species is native to Turkey, with possible sightings elsewhere due to garden escapes. It occurs in woodland and subalpine habitats.

== Medicinal use ==
Many people use the plant in different folk medicines. It has also been looked into for its anti-cancer properties, including slowing the growth of cancer cell lines.
