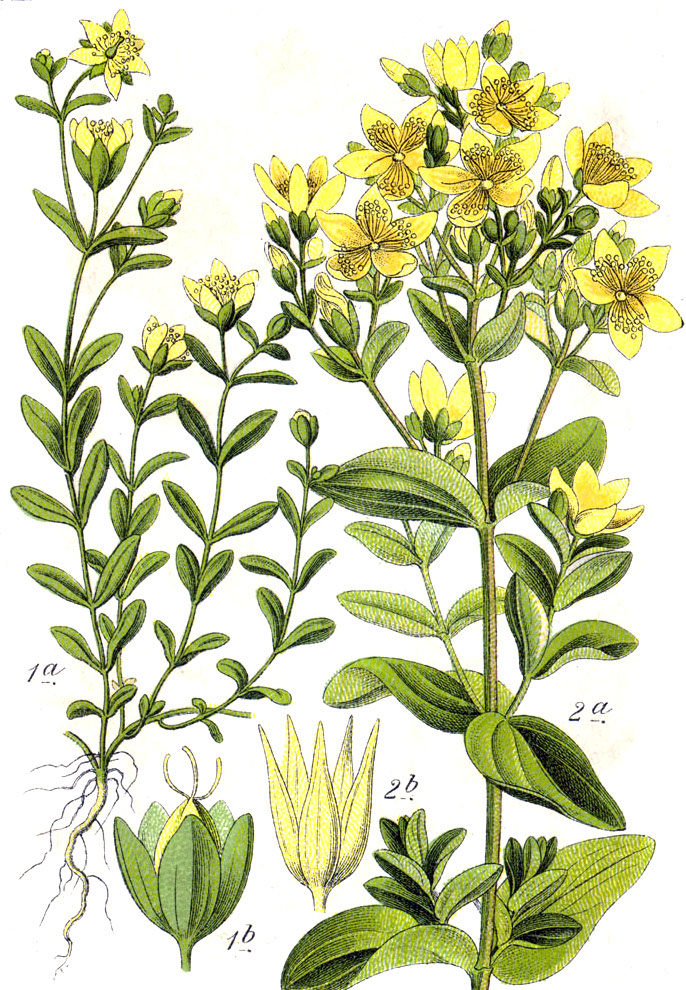

Scientific classification
- Kingdom: Plantae
- Clade: Tracheophytes
- Clade: Angiosperms
- Clade: Eudicots
- Clade: Rosids
- Order: Malpighiales
- Family: Hypericaceae
- Genus: Hypericum
- Section: Hypericum sect. Hypericum
- Subsection: Hypericum subsect. Hypericum
- Series: Hypericum ser. Hypericum
- Species: H. tetrapterum

Binomial name
- Hypericum tetrapterum Fries

Synonyms
- Hypericum acutum subsp. tetrapterum (Fr.) Maire; Hypericum quadrangulum subsp. tetrapterum (Fr.) Hook.f.; Hypericum quadrangulum var. tetrapterum (Fr.) Borg; Hypericum quadrialatum Wahlb.; Hypericum tetrapterum var. genuinum Cout.

= Hypericum tetrapterum =

Species of flowering plant

Hypericum tetrapterum (syn. H. quadrangulum) is a herbaceous perennial plant species in the flowering plant family Hypericaceae. Its common names include St. Peter's wort, Peterwort, square stemmed St. John's wort, and square stalked St. John's wort (sometimes as John's-wort).

== Description ==
Hypericum tetrapterum is a rhizomatous, glabrous perennial plant growing up to 1.2 m (3 ft 11 in) in height. The stems are square in cross section, with conspicuous wings at the corners. The leaves are in opposite pairs, simple and entire, and have many translucent glandular dots. The thinly papery leaves are up to 40 mm (2 in) long and 24 mm (0.9 in) across and paler underneath. The flowers are produced in flowerheads of 10–30 flowers (up to 70), each flower 10–15 mm (0.39–0.59 in) in diameter with 5 pale yellow petals and 5 sepals. There may be black glands on the petals and sepals, as well as on the leaves.

== Distribution and habitat ==
Hypericum tetrapterum is native to temperate Europe, the Mediterranean basin countries of Europe, north Africa, and western Asia, and the Caucasus, Iraq, and Iran. It is common in damp habitats such as marshes, streamsides, open ditches, meadows, and springs.

== Varieties ==
Three varieties are accepted.

- Hypericum tetrapterum var. anagallifolium Boiss. – southern Turkey to Israel
- Hypericum tetrapterum var. corsicum (Steud.) Boiss. – Corsica
- Hypericum tetrapterum var. tetrapterum – entire range
