= Preveli Beach =

Beach in Crete, Greece

Coordinates: 35.1527°N 24.4741°E

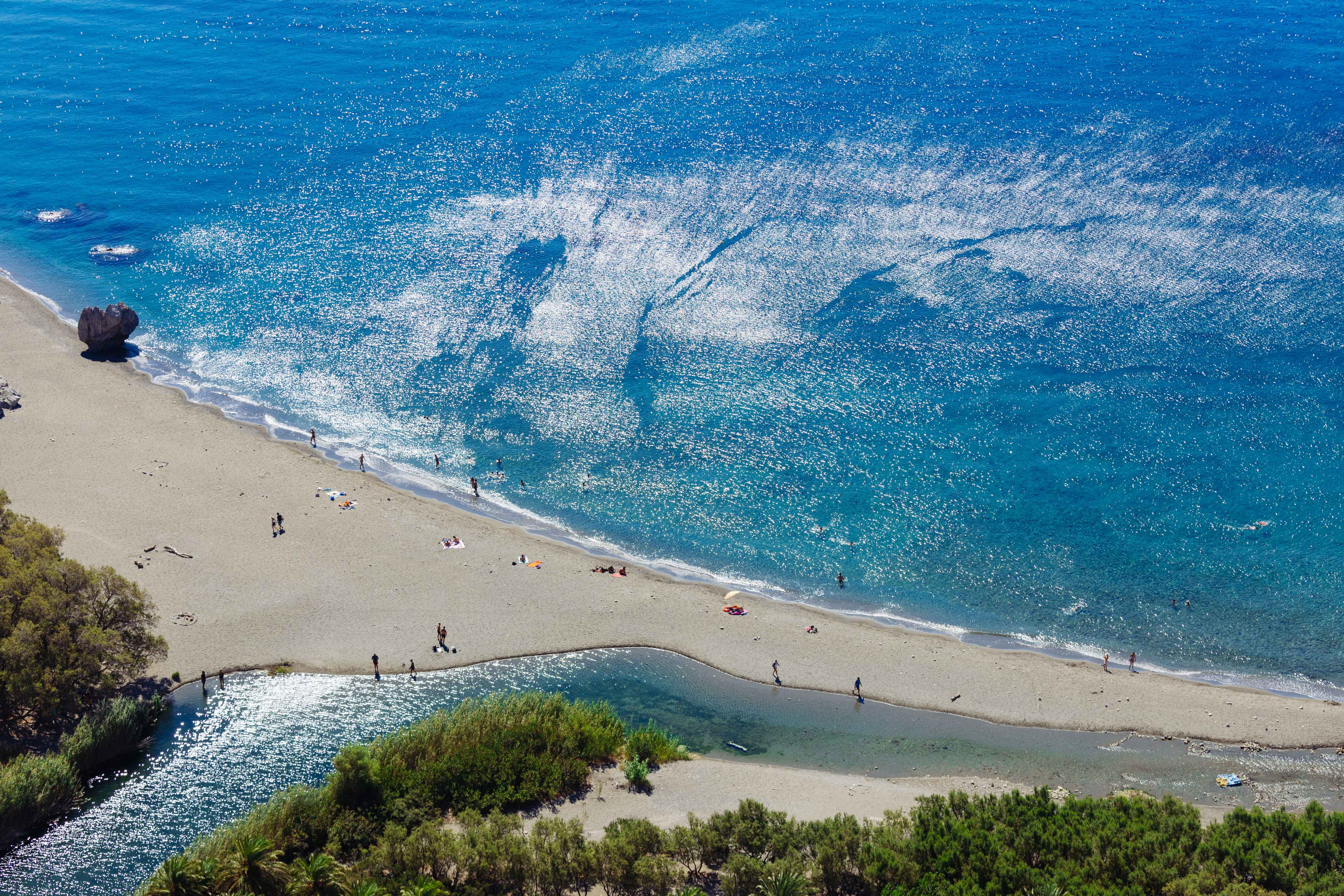
View of Preveli Beach

Preveli Beach (Greek: Φοινικόδασος της Πρέβελης, Finikodasos tis Prevelis) is a beach located on the south coast of the Greek Mediterranean island of Crete. It is located in the municipality of Agios Vasilios in the Rethymno regional unit, not far from the Moni Preveli monastery, whose name has passed on to it. According to local legend, the king of Ithaca, Odysseus, remained in the wider area of Lake Preveli after the end of the Trojan War on his return to Ithaca from Troy.

The area is a popular tourist destination due to the river, the forest with palm trees in the gorge, and the sandy beach with clear waters. On the beach, there is a rock in the shape of a heart, "The stone of lovers" according to the locals.

The area is accessible from the port of Plakias.

== Destruction of the palm forest by fire and rapid regeneration ==
Most of the palm forest in Preveli was burned in the big fire that broke out in the area, in the early hours of Sunday, 22 August 2010. Almost 70% of the forest was destroyed. But the palm forest of Prevelis, thanks to the fire resistance unknown until recently distinguishing the date palm of Theophrastus, managed only in the next autumn quarter of 2010 not only to be reborn but also to keep alive the same "incinerated" adult palm trees of Theophrastus. At the same time, new seeds sprouted. In order to help the natural reforestation, an effort was made to protect the forest from grazing and trampling.
