= Vai (Crete) =

Region in eastern Crete, Greece

Vai Aesthetic Forest
- Φοινικόδασος τοῦ Βάι
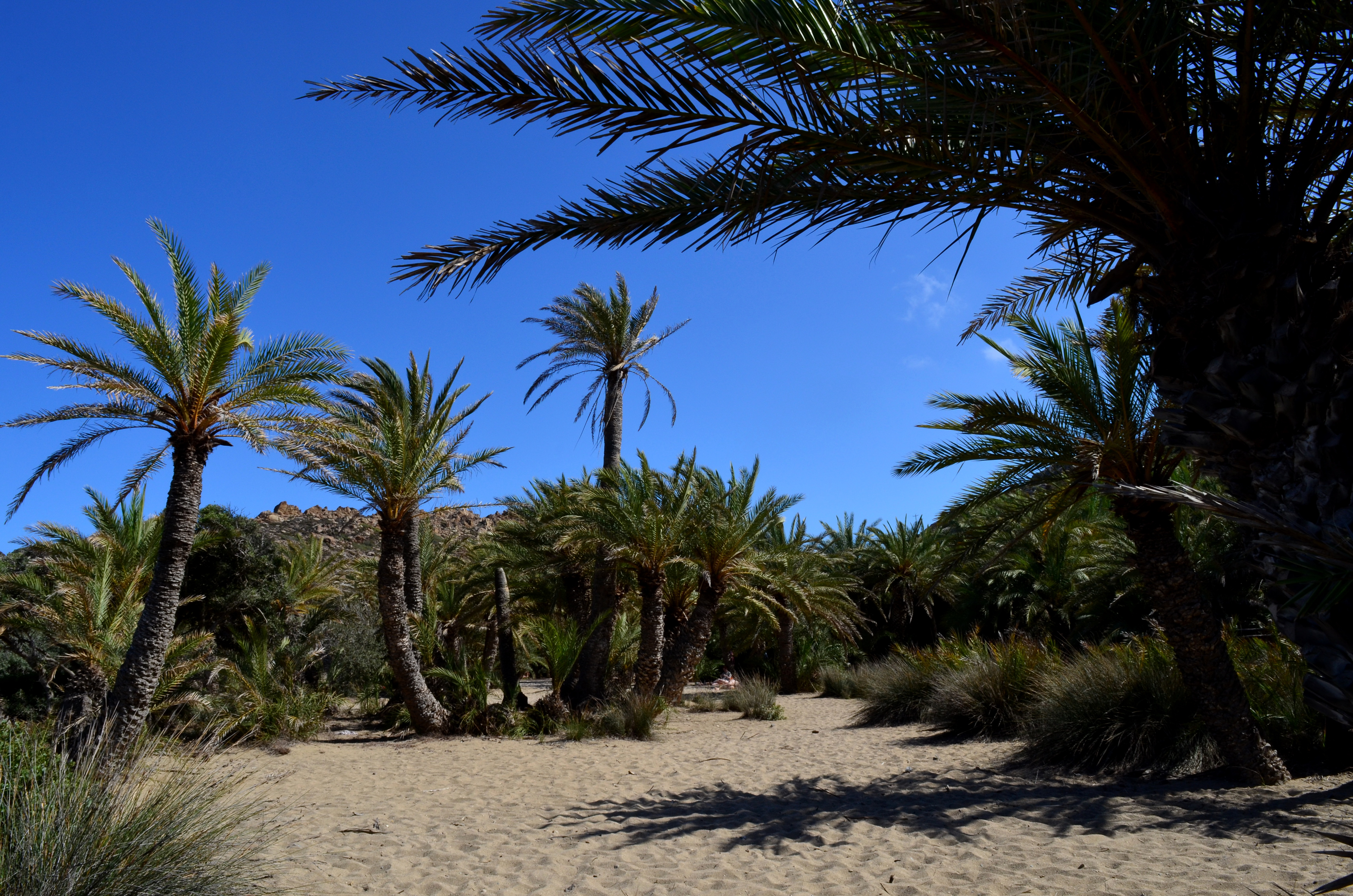
- The open forest is shown with Phoenix theophrasti in all stages of development from free-standing trees to small maquis-type bush trees.

- Location within Crete
- Nearest town: Palaikastro
- Coordinates: 35°15′16″N 26°15′39″E
- Length: 0.568 mi (0.914 km)
- Width: 0.106 mi (0.171 km)
- Area: 20 ha (49 acres)
- Max. elevation: 7.6 m (25 ft)
- Min. elevation: 0
- Designation: National Park
- Established: 1985
- Governing body: Greek Forestry Service

Vai beach Παραλία Βάι
- Beach
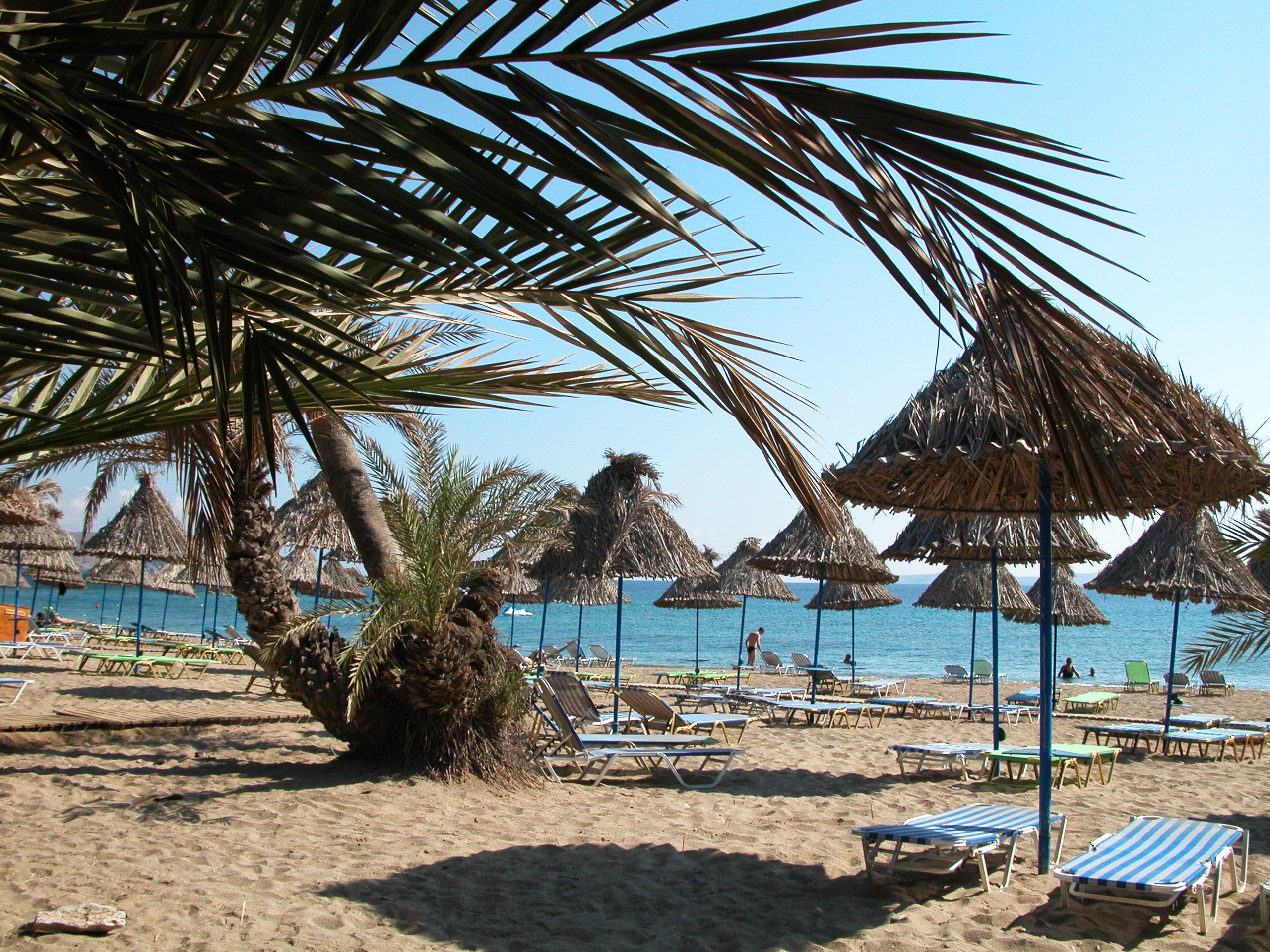
- The central beach from the palm line showing the sun shelters.
- Interactive map of Vai beach
- Coordinates: 35°15′17″N 26°15′54″E

Dimensions
  - Length: 256 m (280 yd)
  - Width: 57 m (62 yd)

"Vai Villa" Minoan site
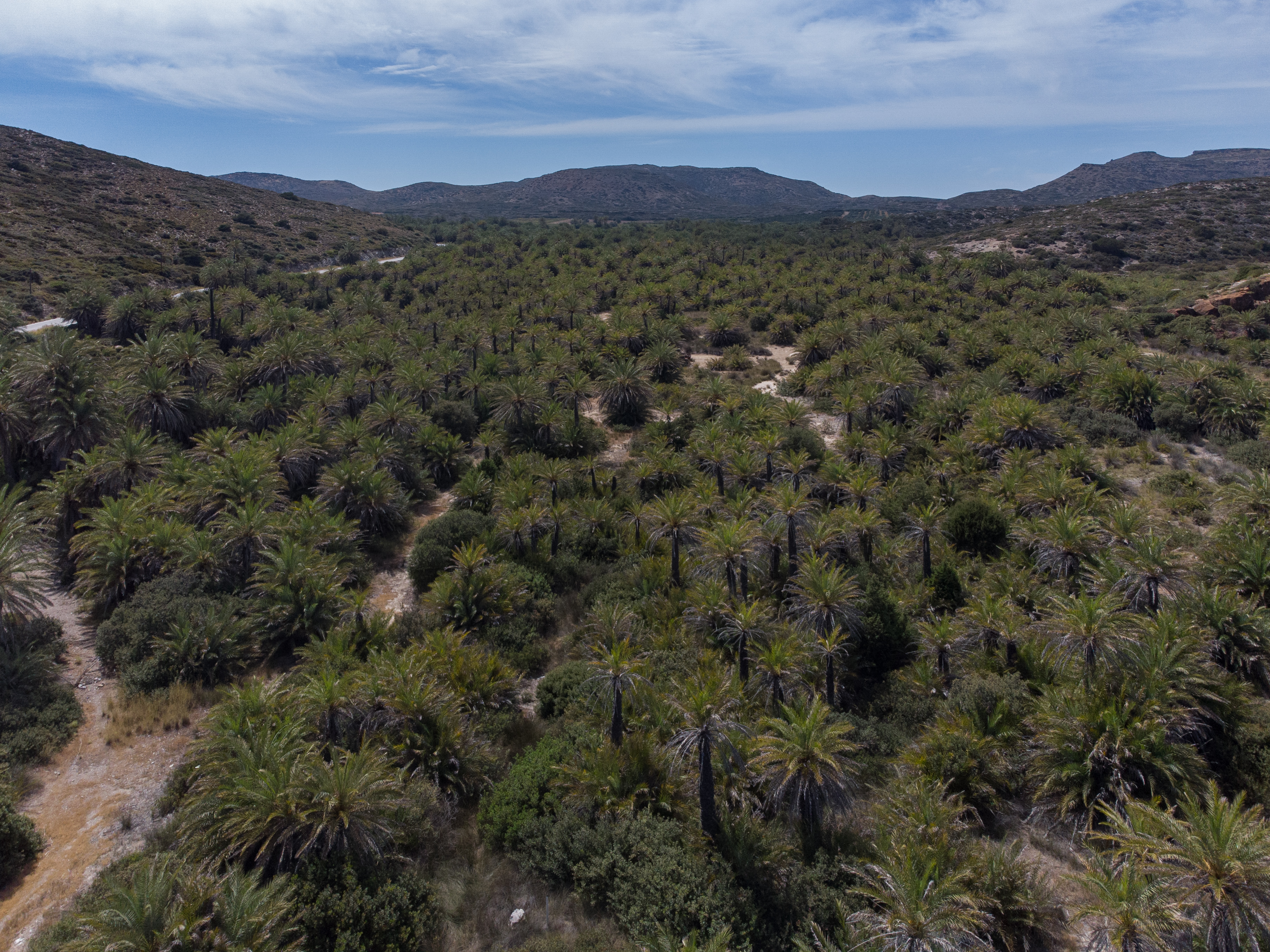
- A view to the west up the valley. The access road is on the left. The region of Vai Villa is out of sight over the pass ahead, in the agricultural land of Toplou Monastery.
- Interactive map of "Vai Villa" Minoan site
- 35°15′01″N 26°15′08″E (Note: The coordinates of survey sites are not being released for publication, but VAI 69 is described as being within sight of the inn.)

Site notes
- Length: 13.33 m (43.7 ft)
- Width: 8 m (26 ft)
- Archaeologists: French School at Athens
- Discovered: 1950
- Condition: Much deteriorated and damaged by a bulldozer.
- Owner: Greek Archaeological Service

Vai (Greek: Βάι), (Note: The diaeresis, a double dot, whether in Greek or English, indicates the a and the i are distinct sounds, rather than a combination. Nuances such as this count in etymologizing.) Greek for "palm", (Note: The word is considered a loan from Coptic (ancient Egyptian) bai through the medium of the Greco-Egyptian culture of Alexandria, whose dependency hellenistic Itanos, owner of Vai, was. El-Kady 2009, p. 20 "The Coptic word for the palm branch is ba or bai usually used specifically for the midrib of the frond, which is derived from the Egyptian ... ba.") is a region of east Crete between Cape Sidero and Cape Plaka, just south of the site of ancient Itanus but north of the villages that surround and are part of Palaikastro. Vai does not belong to them nor is it part of any civic unit of the local civic division of Greece. It is not itself an official village. (Note: The term "Vai village" is sometimes used of a real estate development and supporting businesses, but these are privately owned and are not a named public domain of their own.) The region is somewhat isolated on the isolated northeast peninsula, connecting only to Eparchos odos moni Toplou, the only road between Palaikastro and Toplou Monastery. (Note: The same road heads to the south along the coast and also joins the monastery to Siteia. East of the monastery it divides, the branch being the road that runs out on Cape Sidero to the military base.) The entire distance is essentially trackless and deserted, as the name of one of the beaches at Itanus suggests, Eremoupolis, "deserted city".

Vai is a protected area under the jurisdiction of the national government. It has been defined as different kinds of parkland by different governmental agencies. Vai Palm Forest, or more officially Vai Aesthetic Forest, contains several thousand palm trees in a valley perpendicular to the beach and running down to it. Before being protected, the forest was used as an ad hoc campground by a large transient population frequenting the beach. In the late 20th century, to protect it, the forest was declared a national park and was surrounded by a barbed-wire fence.

Vai beach is popular but crowded. Staying on the beach overnight is not allowed. Some daytime facilities are collected in a building center behind the beach, and there is a parking lot. A few restaurants have taken advantage of the road. Palms extend across the back of the beach. In front of them are rows of quasi-permanent shelters from the sun, which vary from decade to decade: umbrellas at one time, tents at another, thatched roofs at another. Overnight visitors are expected to find lodging and necessities in the villages surrounding Palaikastro to the south, a few minutes away. To the north is the deserted city of Itanos, which, however, has some camping and two beaches. Itanos beach as well as Psili Ammos beach to the south have been clothing optional. North of Eremoupolis beach, the shoreline becomes rugged and cliff-lined, and the country desert.

The next most general park system imposed on Vai is the Natura 2000 protected areas mandated by the European Union in conjunction with the government of Greece. The abandoned land on the Itanos peninsula of Cape Sidero, from which the national park had been created by eminent domain, is a refugium (biological "refuge") for indigenous plant and animal species, many rare or endangered, as well as a station of the migration routes for a large number of migratory birds. The ecology needs to be protected.

Coincidentally the entire area had come under archaeological scrutiny by a collaboration of archaeological organizations, such as the French School at Athens, which had been conducting excavations on ancient Itanus, just to the north of Vai, and had also discovered the Minoan villa. The resulting Itanos Archaeological Survey conducted during the period 1994-2005 had located roughly 100-200 sites covering occupation of the cape since the Neolithic. The government therefore declared two new Natura 2000 protected areas in northeast Crete, GR4320006 authorized under the Habitats Directive for protection of the species, and GR4320009 for protecting sites of community importance.

Between them the two Natura 2000 areas account for the entire NE peninsula from and including Cape Plaka, but not as far west as Siteia, all of Cape Sidero and the offshore islands, and most of the survey territory. In 2015 a third level of park was applied, the Sitia UNESCO Global Geopark, protecting the geological formations of all of east Crete.

Except for Palaikastro and the surrounding villages, the region had no official settlements, the reason being that until after WWII the land except for Palaikastro was owned by Toplou Monastery. In the disputes over the land in the late 20th and early 21st centuries, the land was regarded as real estate, a form of property. The owner of land should have the use of it and should be able to dispose of it. When the government took possession of the tip of Cape Sidero and built a military base there, it denied the use of the land to the monastery, and yet maintained the monastery's ownership of the land. The Greek Archaeological Service similarly took possession of the archaeological sites, and the National Forest Service of the palm forest, and yet the fiction was maintained that the monastery owned the land. What rights that ownership entailed finally became a matter for the courts.

These developments left the 2011 municipal planners with the problem of how to treat the former monastic lands. Except for creating the settlement of Toplou to contain the monastery and its industry, and the settlement of Kyriamadi for the base, they did nothing. The monastery still owns farms and businesses in the area. It can't do anything contrary to the dictates of the parkland, which is administered as a Natura 2000 protected area, and yet it otherwise owns the land and retains the rights of owners. Restaurants and other businesses along the road give their addresses as a number, the name of the road, and "Toplou", "Palaikastro", or "Siteia", all in the Toplou hierarchy.

== Vai aesthetic forest ==
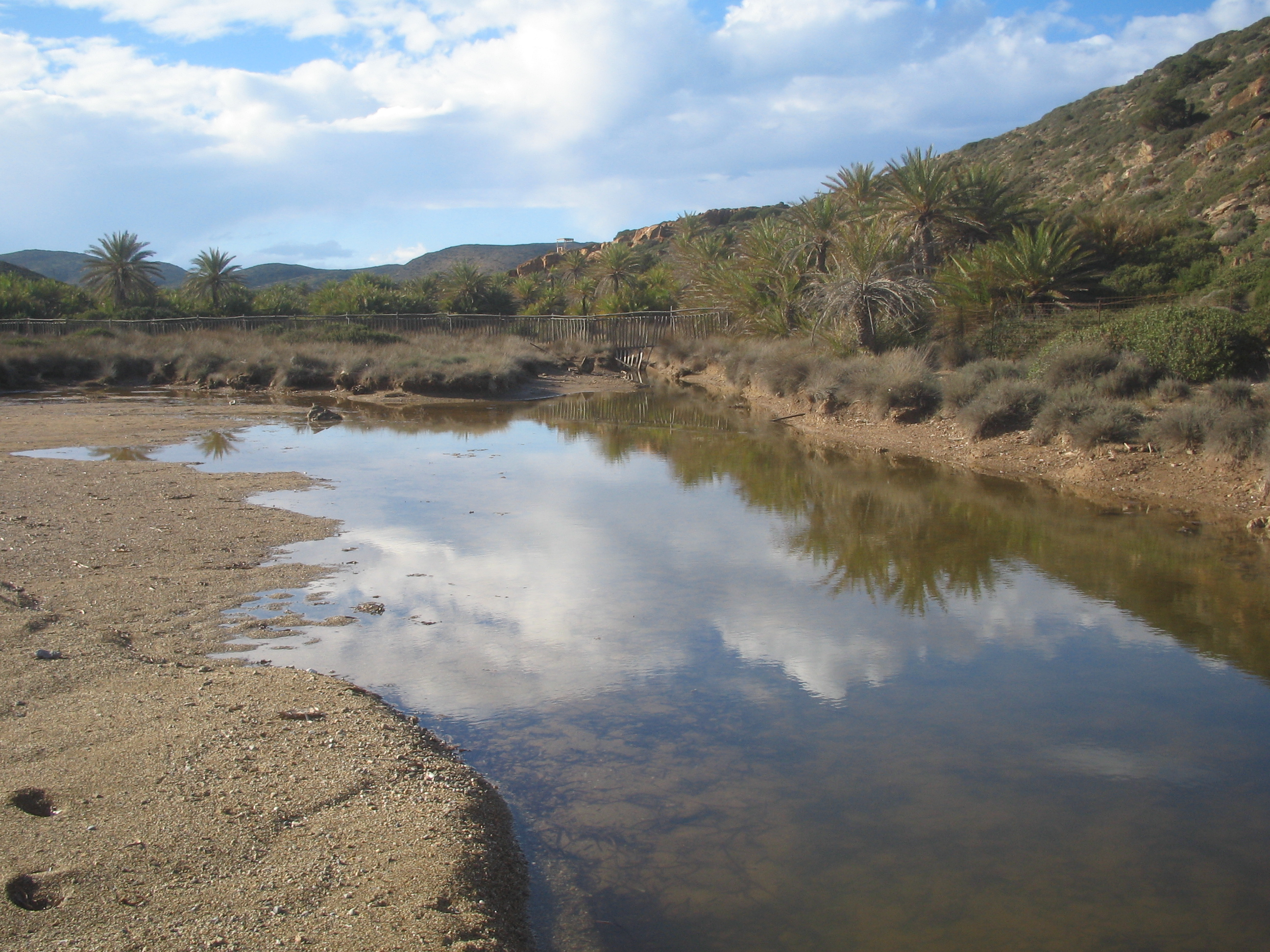
Wetlands of the lower forest

=== The discovery of theophrasti ===
Vai palm forest is named for Phoenix theophrasti, one of 14 species of the genus Phoenix, etymologically another ancient Greek word for "palm". The botanical palms are the Arecaceae family, flowering, evergreen perennials containing a spirally arranged cluster of fronds branching from the top of an otherwise unbranching stem, a configuration readily identifiable to anyone ancient or modern as a "palm tree".

There are five subfamilies, that of Phoenix being the Coryphoideae, most of which have palmate leaves ("hand-like"). Of its 8 tribes, the Phoeniceae contains only one genus, Phoenix, which, exceptionally to the Coryphoideae, have pinnate leaves ("feather-like"). Palms bear a wide variety of nut-like fruits. Phoenix, however, bears dates, which are soft, oily, sweet nuts. The "date palm", dactylifera, is the species of date cultivation. The name is often followed by an L., meaning the classification is of Linnaeus. The other species do not bear fruits sufficiently large and sugary to be edible, but hybrids between them and P. dactylifera L. are cultivated.

Until 1967 the Vai palms were taken to be "an escaped cultivar of the Date Palm...." In that year Werner Greuter noticed certain differences and presented the Vai palm as a different species, which he named theophrasti after Theophrastus, the botanist at Aristotle's school at Athens, the Lyceum, which he inherited on the exile and death of Aristotle. In Peri Phytōn Historias (Note: "Concerning the History of PLants") he uses Phoenix to refer, not just to P. dactylifera, but to any palm whatsoever, as had Aristotle before him in his own Peri Phyton. (Note: "On Plants")

In those days, botany was already an old and mainly foreign topic, with plant lore arriving from all over the known world. The Lyceum kept a botanical garden (to go along with the zoo). They sent science officers with Alexander to collect specimens. (Note: This was the origin of the expedition scientist. Linnaeus sent them out, They accompanied the French in Egypt, and Charles Darwin was one.) There is a strong case from comparative philology that that "Phoinix" came from the Egyptian word for date-palm, bnrt. (Note: In this etymology Phoinix would originally have been "palm country", and the "purple" color from the murex dye vended by the Phoenicians, "palm country people". Po-ni-ke-a appears in the Bronze-Age script, Linear B, meaning a color, probably red. Billigmeier, J.-Chr (1977). "Origin of the Greek Word Phoinix" (PDF). Talanta. VIII–IX.) In a second point of view, the source of Phoinix is a variant of brnt, namely bni, meaning "date". (Note: Phoenicia would have been "the land of dates", and the color, the "color of dates.")

These peripatetics, as they were called, (Note: So-called from their delivering lectures while "walking around" the grounds of the Lyceum.) were the closest persons the ancient Greeks had to scientists, because of their insistence on theorizing from data actually investigated. (Note: The contemporary school at Athens, the Academy, managed by Plato, emphasized analytical study of the type surviving in the Socratic dialogues. The peripatetics were in a sense break-away academics, as they had attended the Academy for some years before going with Aristotle's school.) Their method was to apply the new logic Aristotle had devised for the classification of data and the art of definition, which is the ancestor of modern biological uses. The gist of classification was to find objects under the same universal and divide them into subtypes. One defined any subtype (eidos, species) by stating its type (genos, genus) and the difference that distinguished the subtype.

A species might also be a genus with subtypes of its own. This logical telescope failed at either end. (Note: At the top there are no different types of being, as their differences would have to be non-being, or nothing. Aristotle's top category was therefore substance.) At the bottom one might expect to find exactly identical individuals purely of one type, but none such can be found. Every individual of the type differs in some way. The answer to this conundrum was the essence, which was that part of the species that did not vary. Variation was caused by different "accidents", such as shape, size, etc., which were "in" the substance. (Note: Aristotle profered 10 categories, substance and 9 of accident.)

One did not go very far down the hierarchy without encountering a bewildering maze of variants. The essence is indiscernable directly, but not indirectly. The accidents are the clothes, so to speak, worn by the essence. Through the persistence and associations of the accidents the viewer comprehends a unity behind them, which may be hard to define. The easiest course is to use the persistent accidents as differences, which botanists and zoologists have had to do. (Note: For example, anyone can readily and immediately perceive a palm through the pattern and synchronized actions of its accidents. To define a palm, one must resort to citing those accidents as differences.) Linnaeus kept the system, but added standard levels of type and insisted on public authorization of the resulting names.

The peripatetic plant (phyton, etymologically “growth”) is defined as a non-sensitive, animate substance, which transmuted into the kingdom of plants is still credible. Sensitivity, today accounted for by the nervous system, belongs to animals. There is, however, no mention of chlorophyll, the essential ingredient of plants, nor does the color, green, play any role. (Note: There was no Greek theoretical chemistry, even what is today elementary. Chemical reactions were unknown. The most obvious, fire, was thought a substance.) Both Aristotle and Theophrastus subdivide plants into trees, shrubs, and herbs, though Theophrastus adds underbrush. These are not currently taxons, but modern botany still defines them as descriptive types. (Note: See tree, shrub, and herb.) Theophrastus’ definition of palm is a common point between ancient and modern: “The date-palm too bears at the top … but this tree also has its leaves and shoots at the top.” His palm was at the logical level of the modern family.

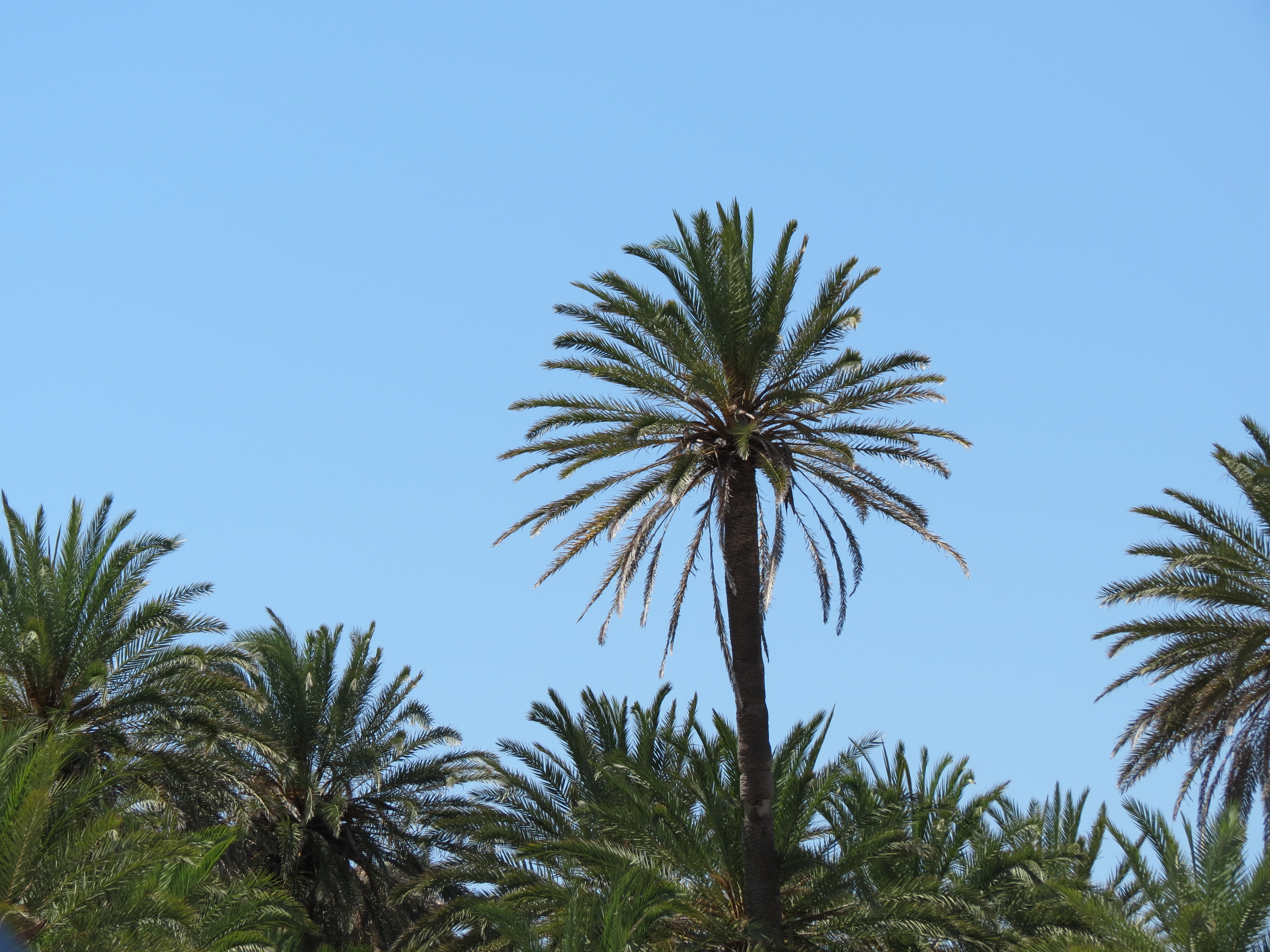
P. theophrasti, single stem

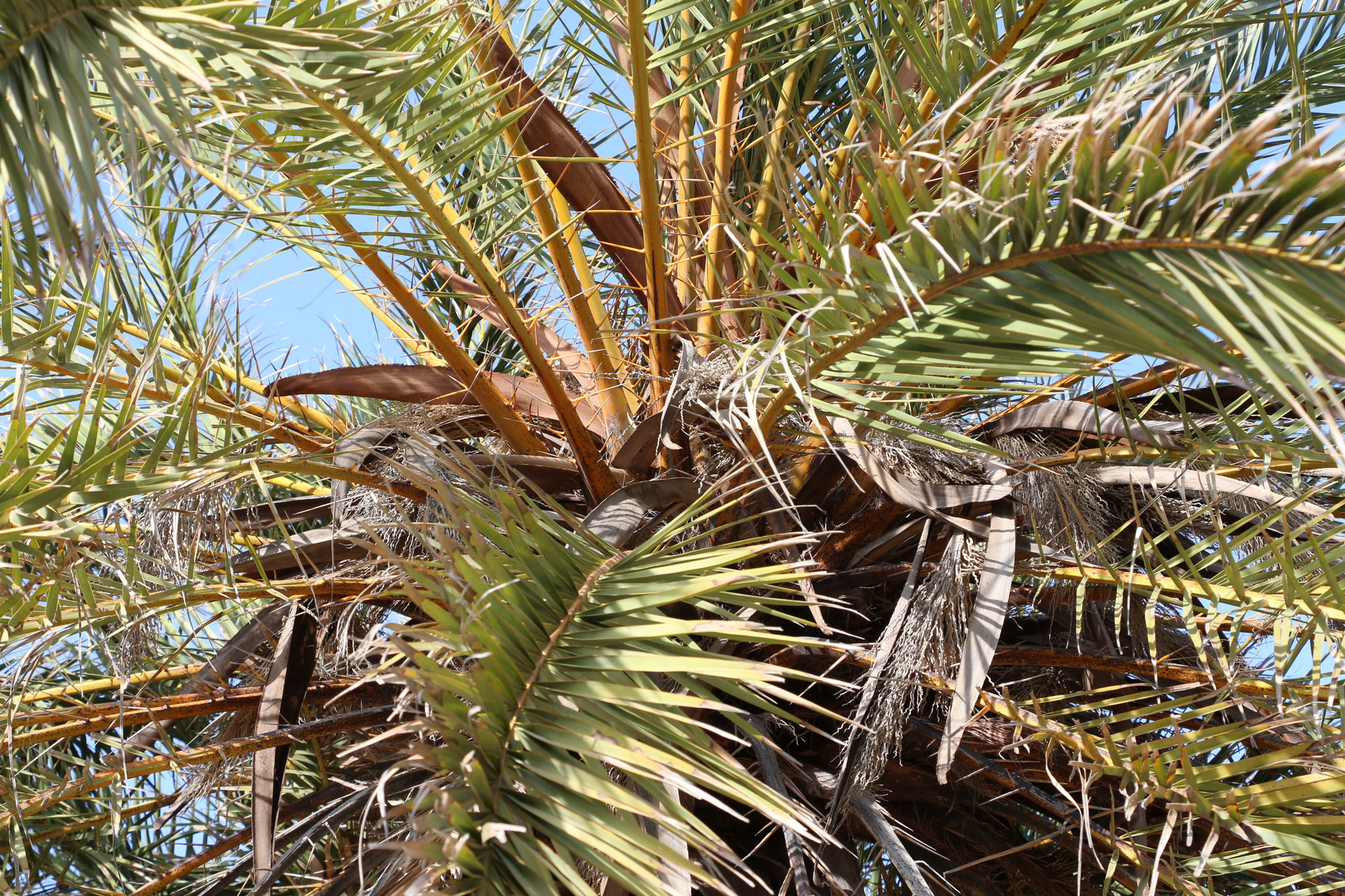
View at the top of the stem showing the spines on the lower fronds

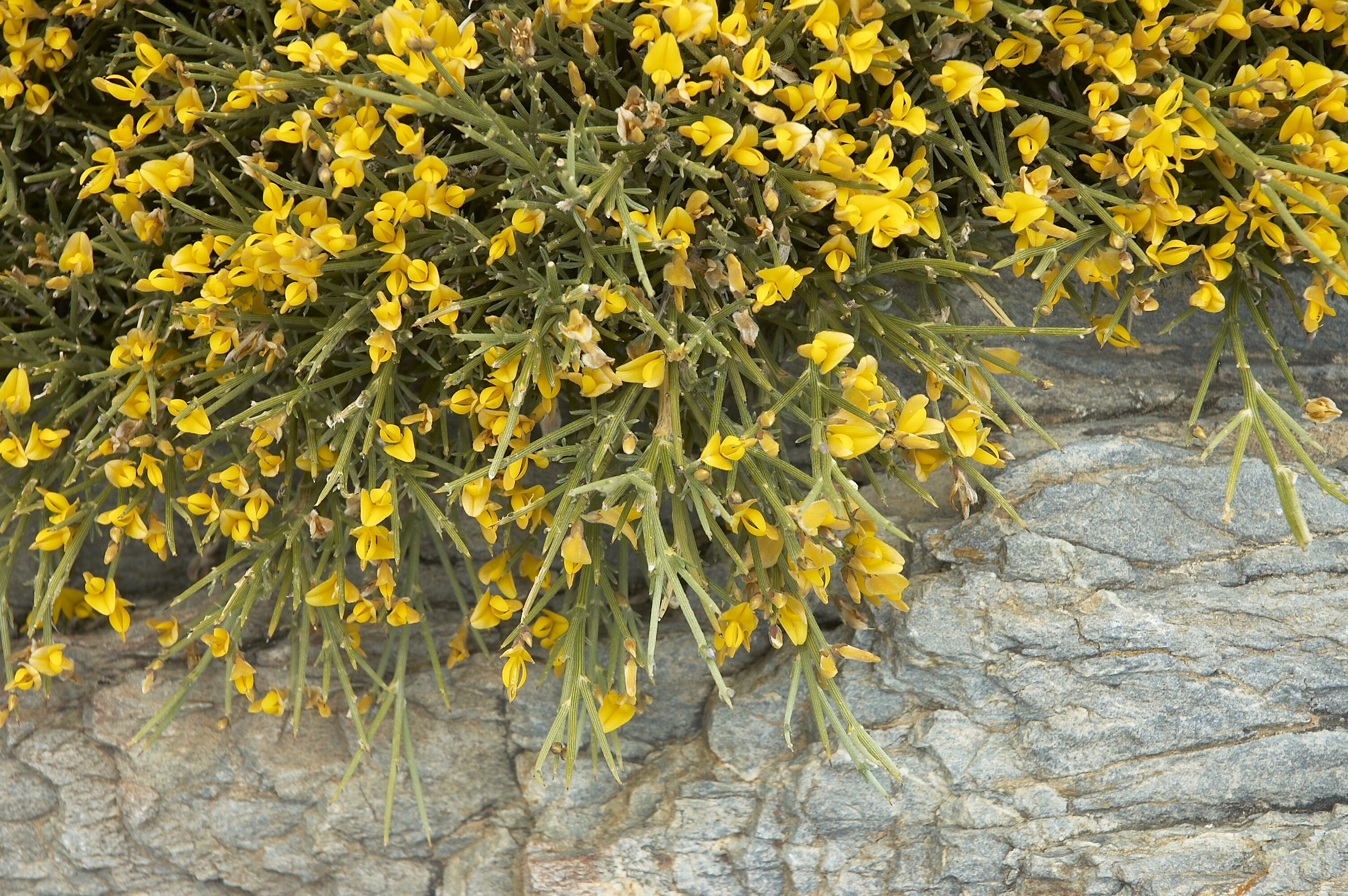
Genista acanthoclada

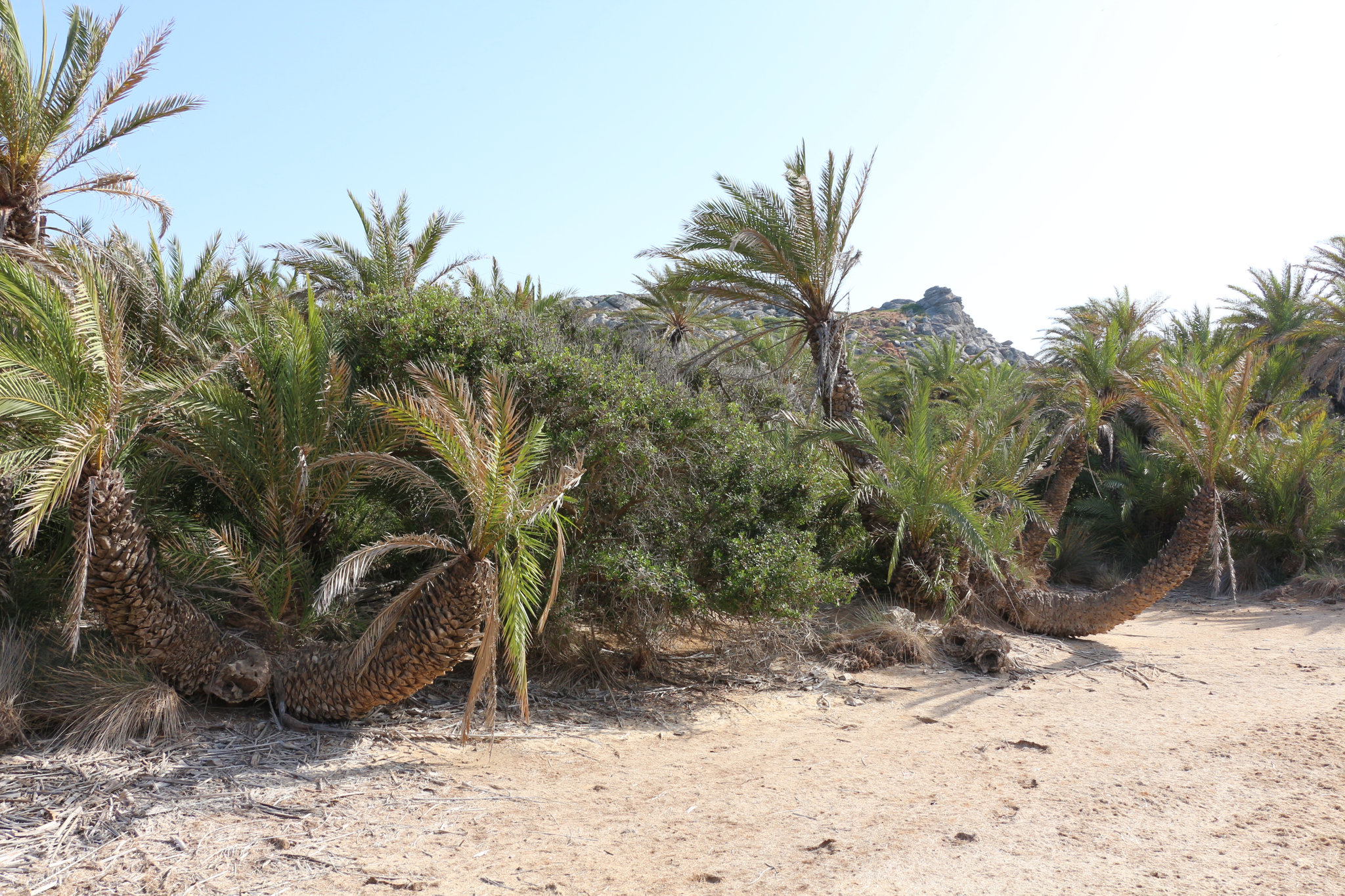
Clumps of 3-stem palms

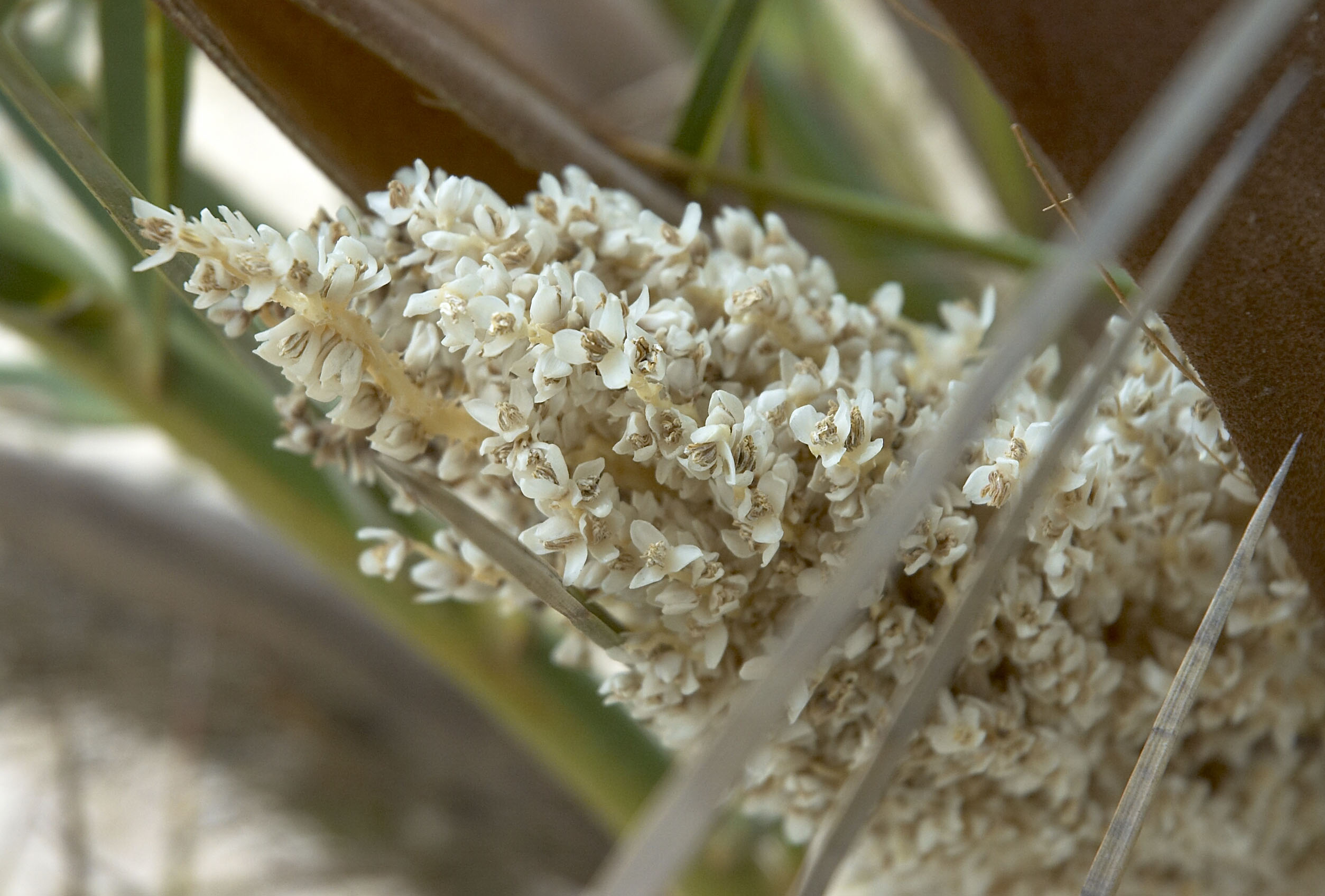
Male palm showing the flowers among the lower fronds

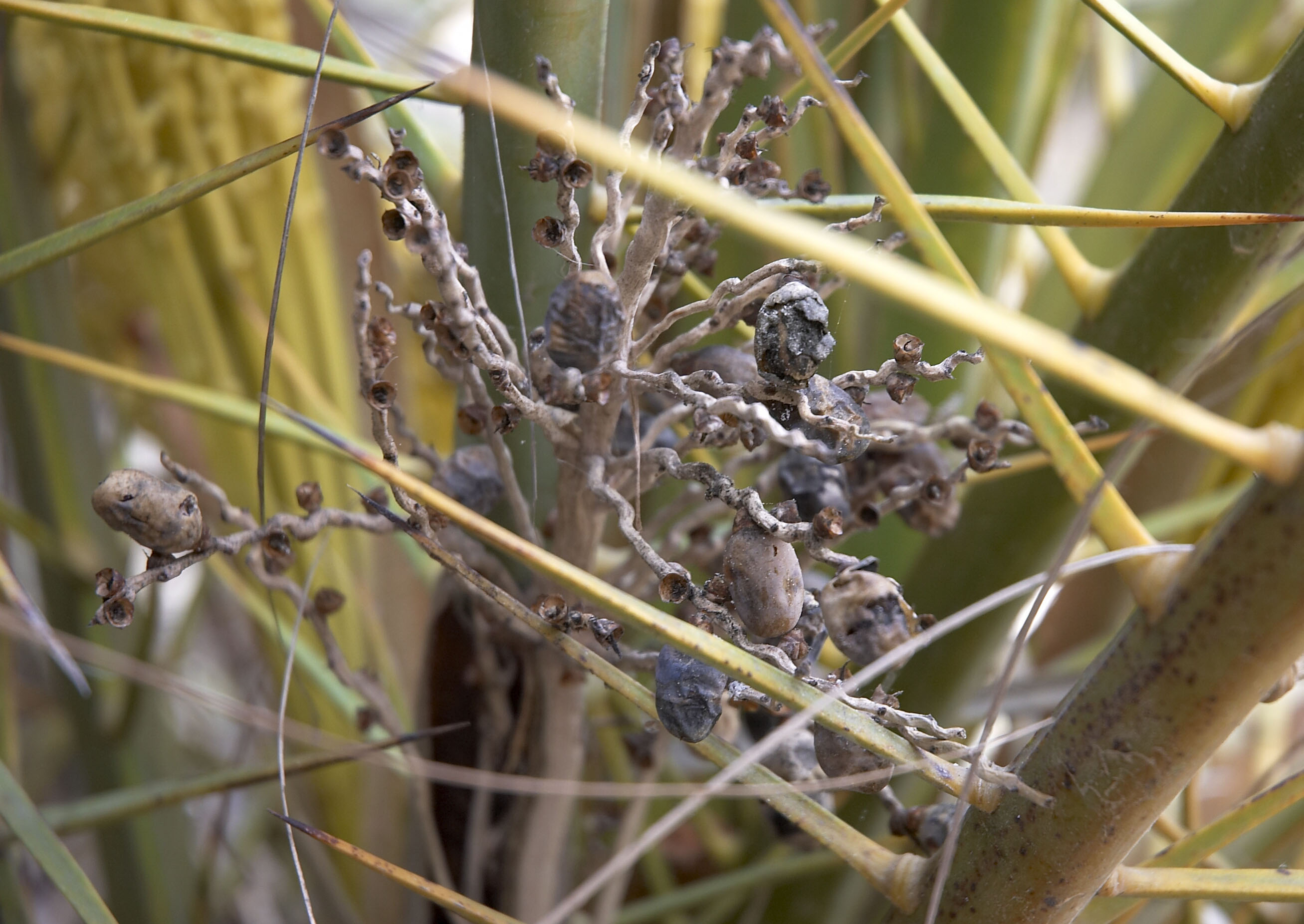
Female palm showing the upright fruit among the lower fronds

=== Recovery of the forest ===
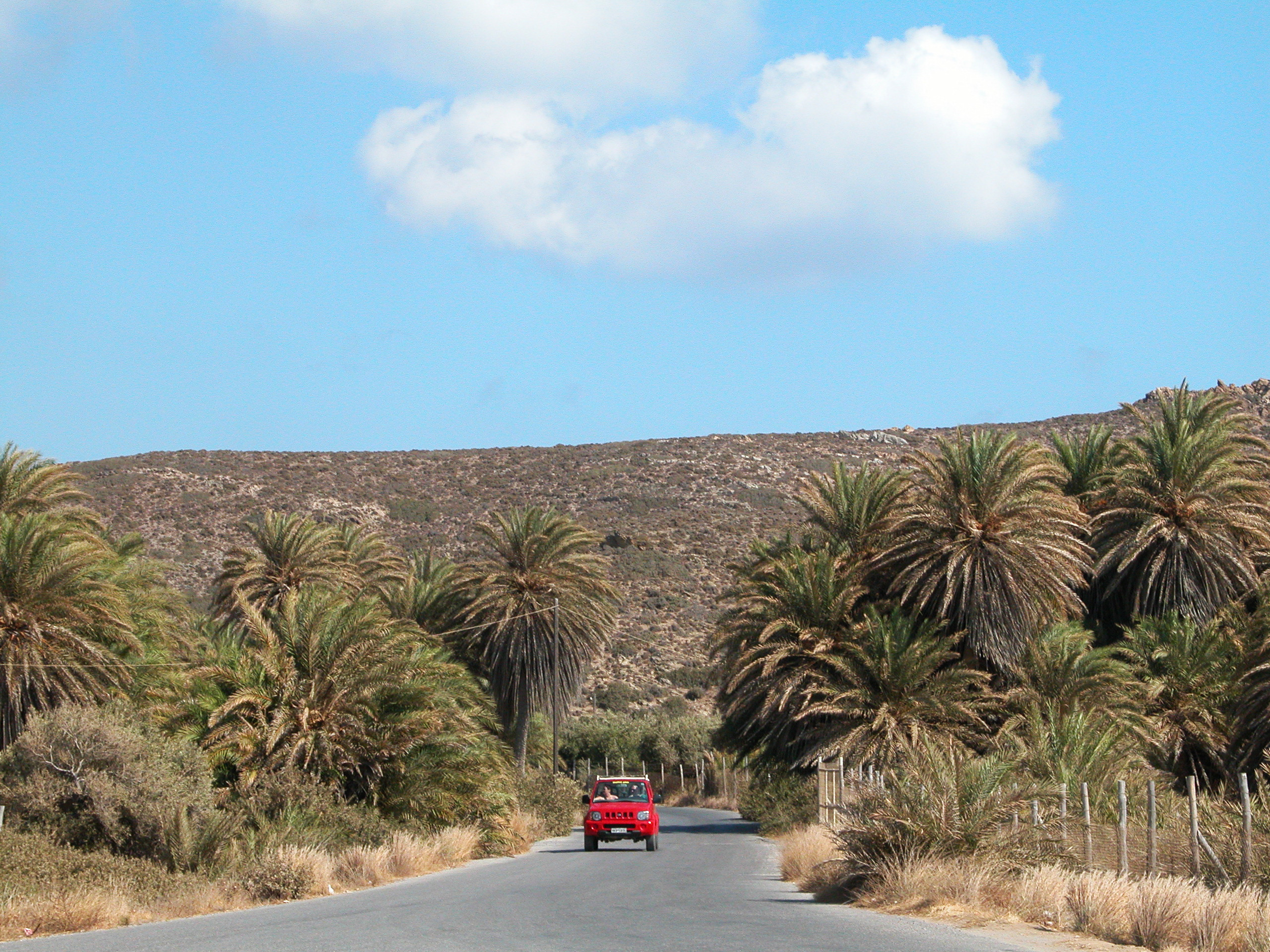
Fenced in forest. Some of the trees have escaped to the other side of the road.

Although the forest was declared a national park in 1987 and was fenced, which probably saved it from destruction by 200,000 or more visitors per year, no effort was made to recover it until Project Vai staged by the European Commission 1999-2002 in compliance with the Habitats Directive of Natura 2000. The forest had been in no danger prior to 1957, consisting of 300 ha (740 acres). In that year a massive agricultural project staged by the monastery uprooted most of the forest, reducing it to 12 ha (30 acres). That slowly increased to 15.6 ha (39 acres) with a few thousand trees.

The Management Plan put into effect by the government as part of Natura 2000 recovered a core forest, today carefully protected. Negotiation with the agents of the monastery acquired additional acreage, though not in the quantity requested. The monastery was included in the caretaker administration. Today the forest is 20 ha (49 acres). The extra acres were replanted. Monitoring of the water table, with an irrigation system to control it if necessary began. The health of the plants is checked. Everything is done to insure regeneration. A public awareness campaign was staged. In addition to the monastery, the Forest Directorate of Lasithi and the Goulandris Natural History Museum were made caretakers.

== Vai coastal features ==
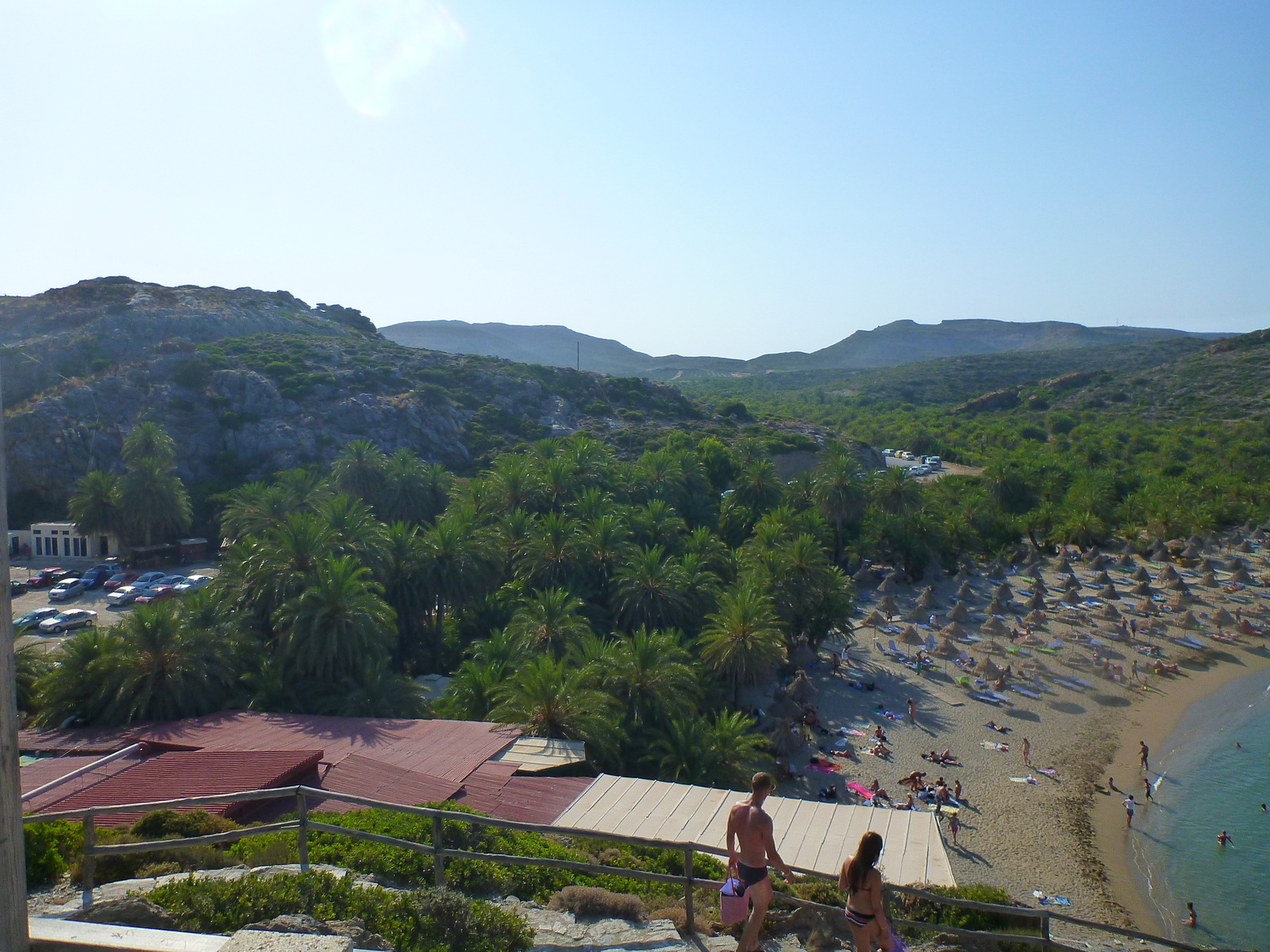
Two of the three valleys at Vai seen from on top the headland between Vai and Psili Ammos beaches. The parking lot is to the left. On the entrance road coming down beside the forest on the right can be seen a line of automobiles waiting to enter the lot.

Northeastern Crete is characterized geologically by a coastal range of hills followed inland by a relatively flat plain, followed further inland by a higher range. The coastal hills alternate with coastal valleys that have eroded into the sea perpendicular to the coastline so as to form headlands alternating with beaches behind which are valleys that may or may not have penetrated into or beyond the plain. The Vai area has three of these. On the south is Psili Ammos beach, which penetrates about 318 m (348 yd) between its headlands and is about 40 m (44 yd) wide, consisting of the "fine sand" for which it is named. The next valley up has been utilized for the Vai beach parking lot, which is about 120 m (130 yd) by 43 m (47 yd) and is surrounded on all sides but one by precipitous rocky slopes. Trails lead to viewpoints from the top.

The next valley north contains the forest. It reaches all the way through the coastal range and is apparent in the highlands beyond it. There are no palms there, however. Whatever connection once existed across the plain has been obliterated by agricultural use. Vai Farm, owned by the monastery, is there. The main road north cuts across the mouth of the coastal valley. A dirt farm road runs parallel to the main road one field further to the coast, forming the border to the forest, which appears cut off there on the maps.

The valley in which the forest exists drops from about 9 m (30 ft) to 0 at the waterline. Within it an intermittent stream emerges from the northern hill and flows down to a wetlands, providing just the amount of water required for the trees.

=== Pigeon rocks ===
Peristerovrachoi, or "pigeon rocks", is a group of islets off the north headland of Vai beach.

=== Vai beach ===
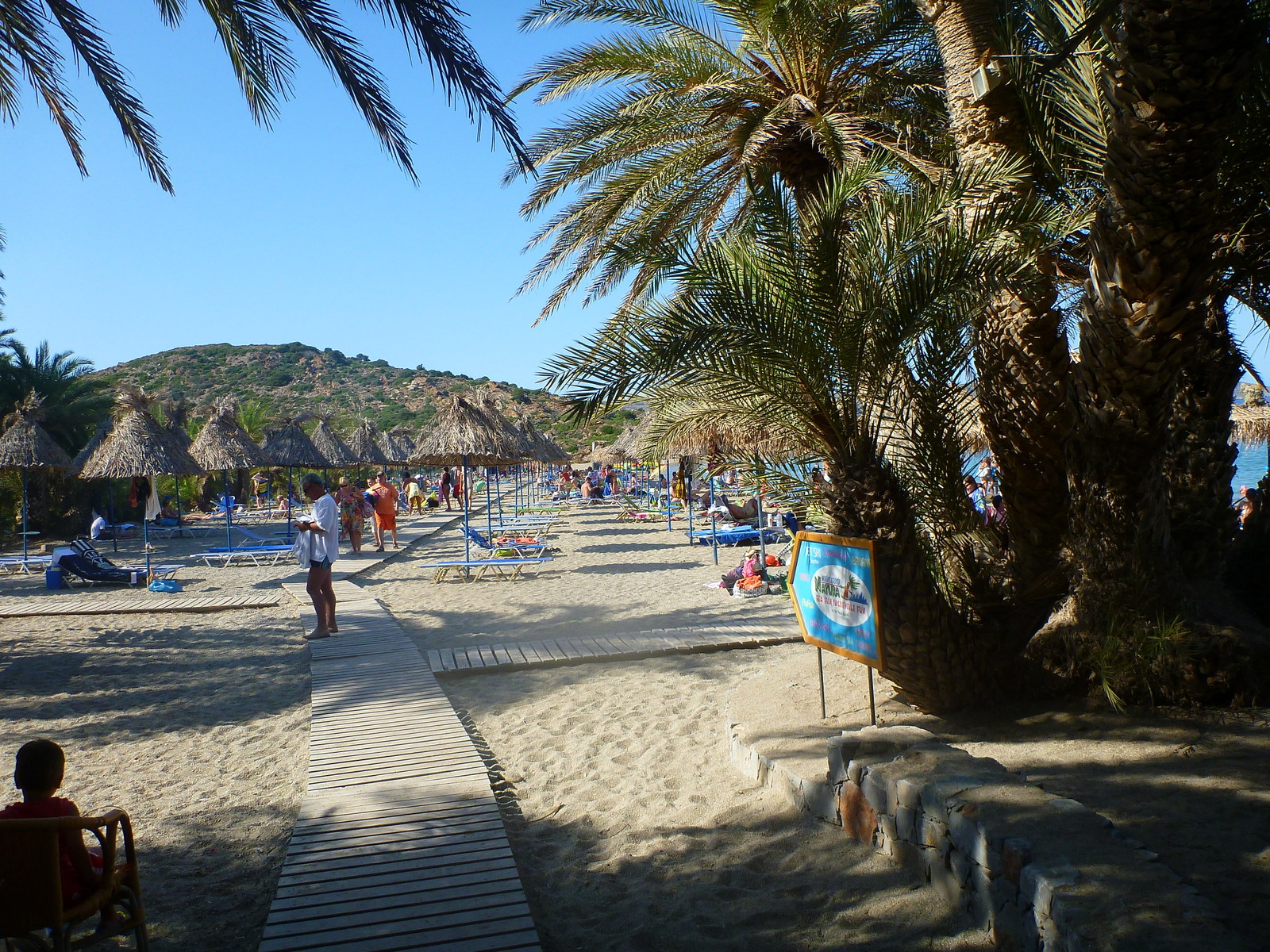
Looking north along the beach through the sun shelters.

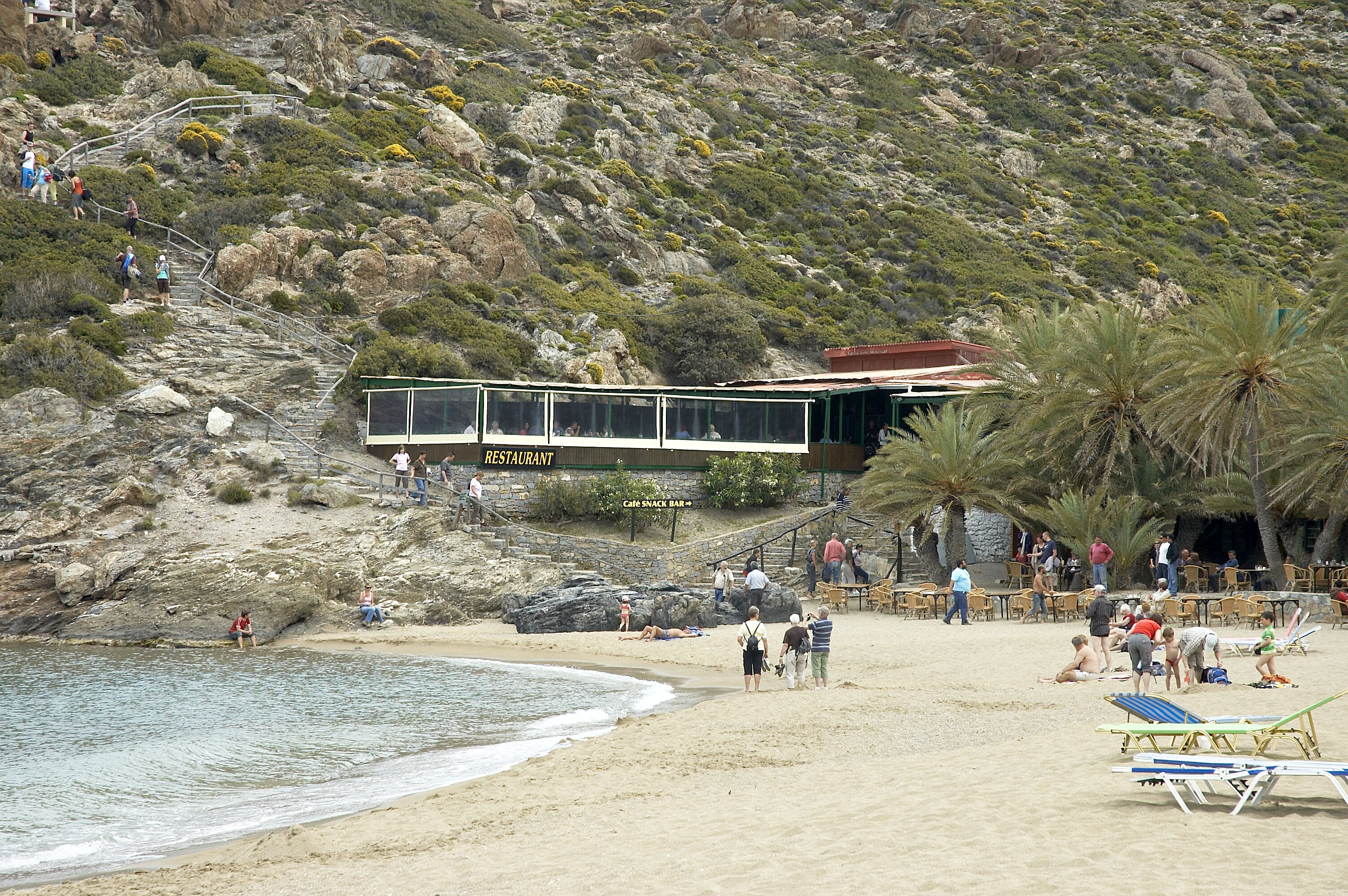
South end of the beach, showing the restaurant and the heights leading to Psili Ammos.

Vai beach is accessed by an east-west side road from the main north-south road, Eparchos odos moni Toplou. About 1 km (0.62 mi) of good, paved road runs along the south side of the forest from which it is separated by a barbed-wire fence. The heights of the coastal hills loom on either side. Near the beach the road turns to the south to enter the parking lot, which is totally enclosed by the hills. The inland side of the beach still has an open palm forest. Walkways lead to the beach, which is totally enclosed by a headland of 47 m (154 ft) to the north and a headland of 10 m (33 ft) to the south. The forest is on the northern part of the beach, where a stream enters the sea, deriving from the northern hill. A restaurant and other buildings have been built up on the slope of the south hill, where also a managed trail leads over the heights to Psili Ammos beach. An array of sun shelters covers the southern part of the beach. These are for rent.

On a typical day the visitor braves the line of traffic to the beach, pays the admission fee, parks in the lot, pays for a lounge chair with cover, and enjoys the beach, dining at the restaurant and using the rest room facilities. For more privacy the visitor can climb over the trail to Psili Ammos. Itanos beach is not accessible from Vai, but is reached by its own access road a little further north. At the end of the day the beach must be vacated. The forest is always off-limits.

=== Psili Ammos beach ===
Psili Ammos beach is named for its "fine sand". A number of beaches have this name throughout the coasts of the Aegean. This one of Crete is located in a ravine on the south side of the southern headland of Vai beach. A specially constructed trail leads over the headland to the beach, which is valued for its privacy and natural beauty. There are no facilities in it; necessities must be carried in.

=== Gallery ===
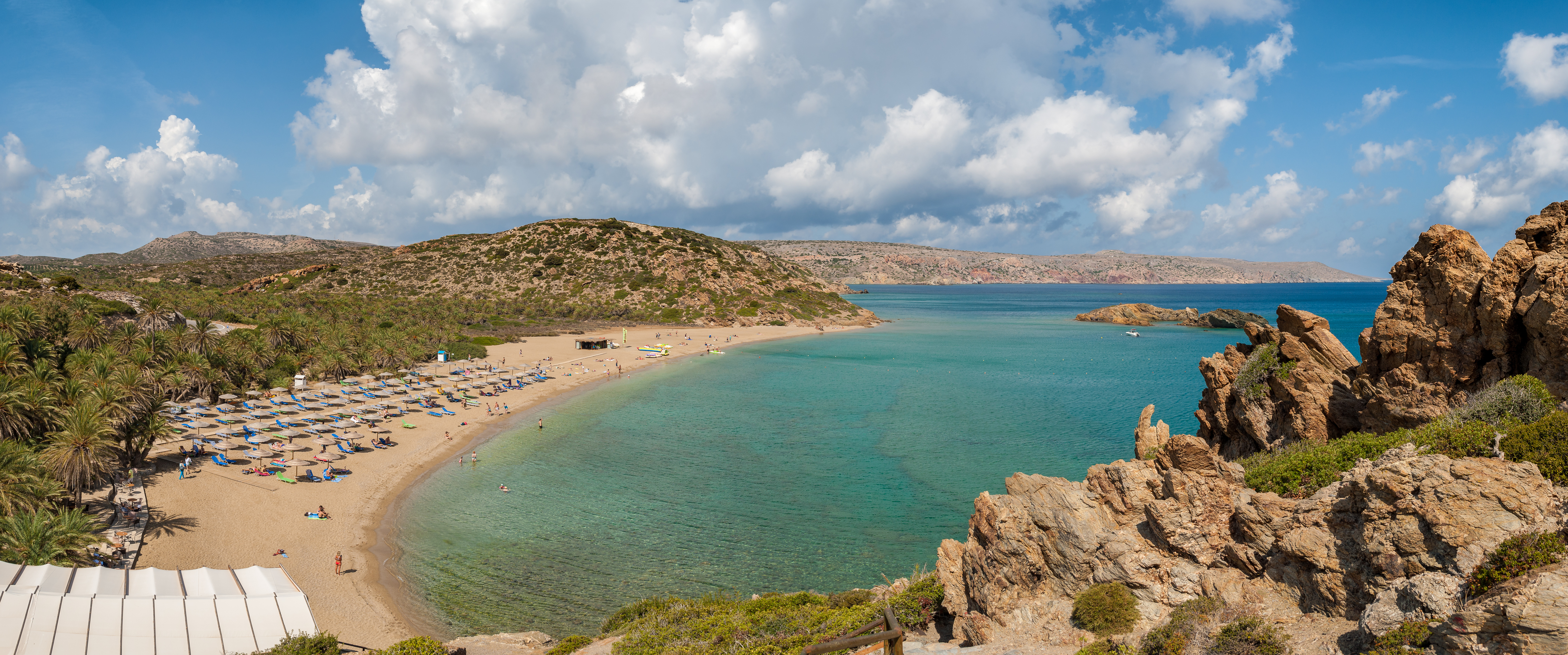
Panorama of Vai beach from the southern headland showing the roof of the restaurant, the sun shelters, the northern headland and pigeon rocks.

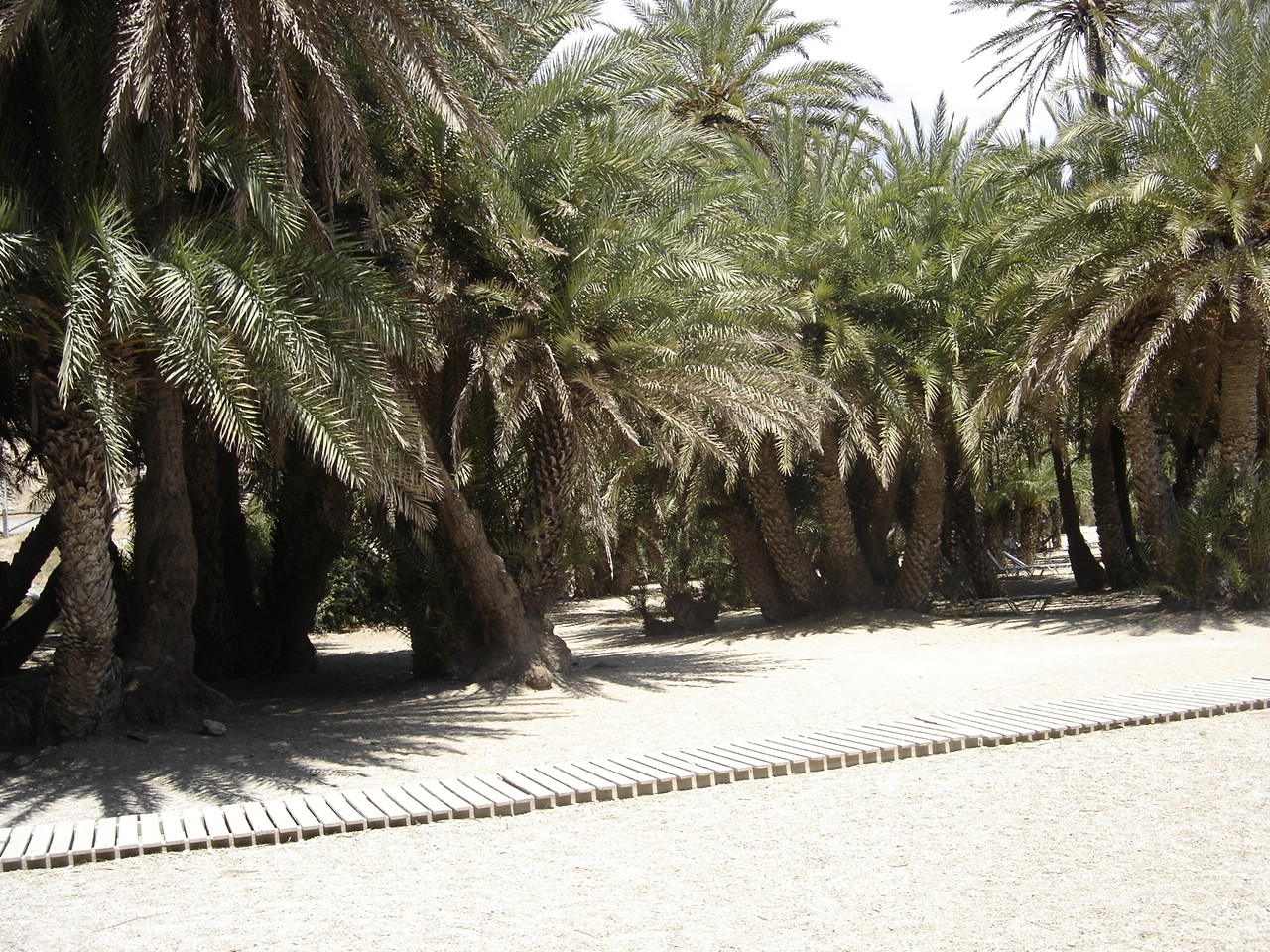
The palm forest remaining at the back of the beach, not actually in the national park. Boardwalks facilitate walking over the sand.

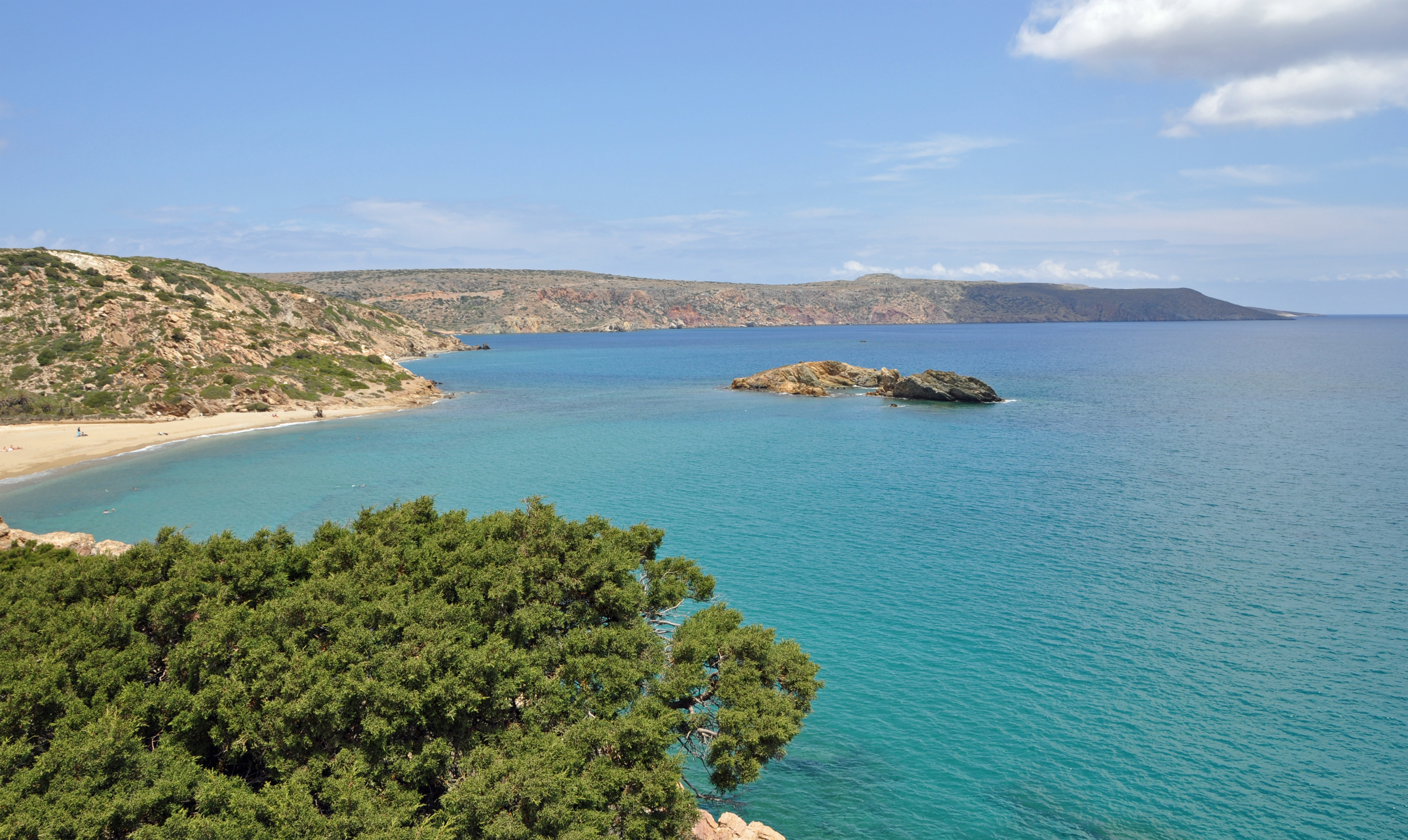
Coast near Vai from the southern headland. Visible is the northern headland, pigeon rocks off its coast, and Cape Sidero in the distance.

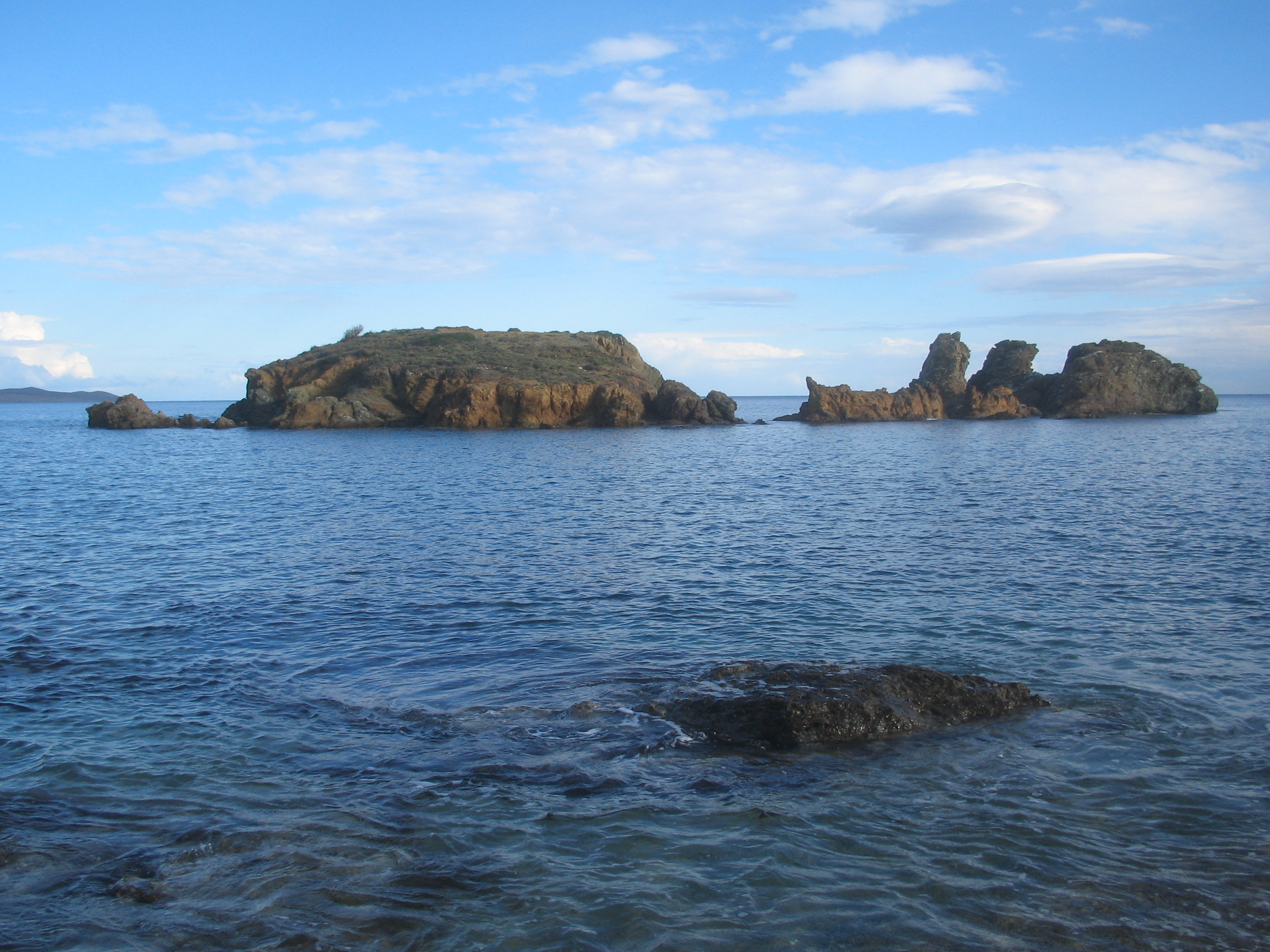
Pigeon rocks from the shore.

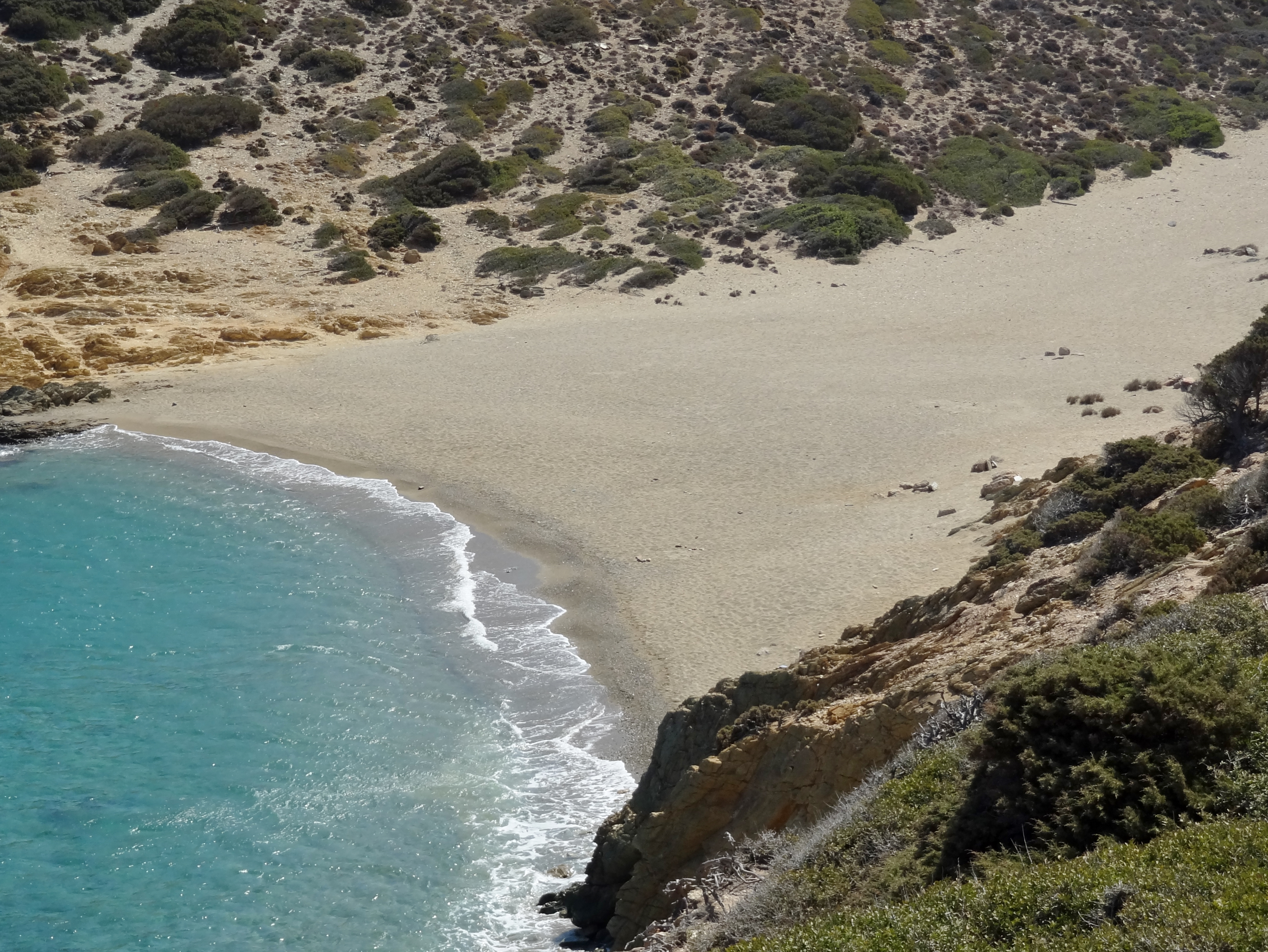
Psili ammos from the south headland of Vai beach.

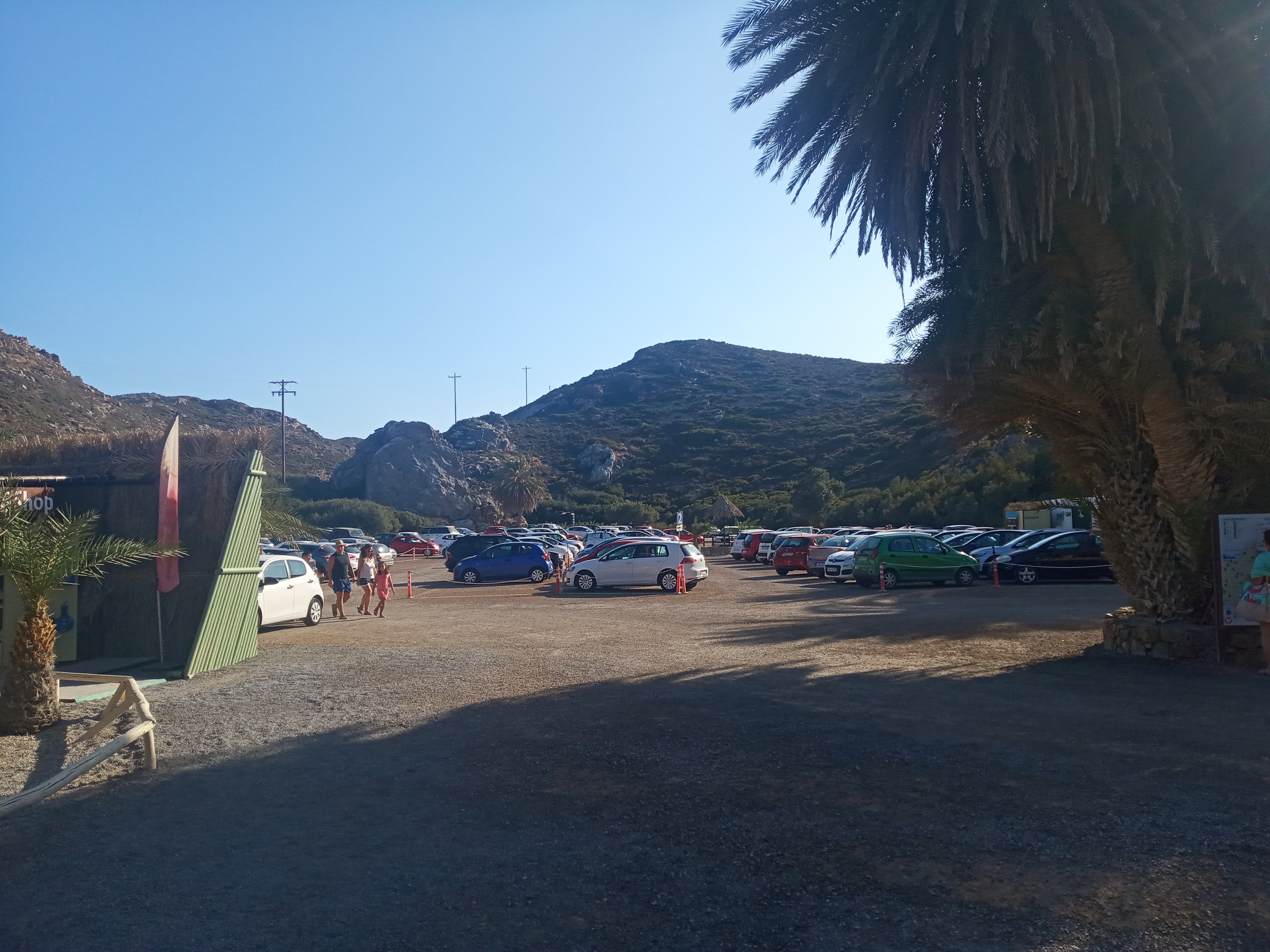
Parking lot, Vai beach.

== Vai villa ==
In 1950 excavators from the French School at Athens, who were there to excavate Itanus looking for Minoan remains, did not find any within the walls of Itanus, but did find some to the south, on a hill in what was at the time Vai Palm Forest. They did some excavating and drew some plans, concluding finally that the remains were a substantial residence of the Late Minoan period, which they dubbed Vai Villa. In 1957 the forest was uprooted in favor of Vai Farm, but the villa survived.

Returning in 1994-2005 the French School in collaboration with other agencies conducted the Itanos Archaeological Survey on the northeast peninsula north of Vai. Dividing it into zones, they termed the southernmost zone Vai. All the sites they found were numbered sequentially. A site was identified by the zone name and the sequence number. Vai zone had 14 sites, of which 5 contained surface evidence (sherds) dating it to the Late Minoan Period. The villa was assigned the identifier Vai 69. Informally it was sometimes called Metochi Vai after the tavern constructed by the monastery near it. (Note: There is also a housing complex of that name elsewhere theoretically consisting of remodelled shepherds' huts. the shepherds supposedly working for the monastery.) The others, Vai 161, 60, 29 and 28, were isolated buildings, except for Vai 161, which was a dam system for impounding a reservoir, and Vai 28, a circular funerary structure. These were all located in the highland south of Vai, except for the villa. In two, the Minoan layer was overlain by Greco-Roman layers. The other 9 of the 15 were entirely Greco-Roman, from which one might suppose, assuming data representative of the original populations, that the Minoans were lightly settled in that area, but the later Greeks more heavily. There was a gap representing the Dark Age.

The most extensive site, the villa, was to suffer bad fortune. Toplou Monastery, owner of the farm, the tavern, and the real estate at Vai, had decided to support its development as a recreational area. A parking lot for the buses ferrying future tourists would be put in place. The contractors got as far as bulldozing a strip before being enjoined to cease and desist. However, the careless operators had moved in on the villa and altered it to such a degree that the plans of 1950 no longer describe it. Those plans remain, but they can't be verified, which may well be the case of other settlements of the survey in the future.

The original plan shows a partial foundation of 6 rooms arranged in two wings meeting in a concave corner seen from outside the house. The long dimension is 13.33 m (43.7 ft) and the short is 8 m (26 ft), with the long oriented to 320°. The area required by the walls is 106.64 m^{2} (1,147.9 sq ft), but this is not the area of the house. Assuming that the long dimension might be the side of a square would obtain 177.69 m^{2} (1,912.6 sq ft) as a minimum area for the house, but long dimension is not terminated on the southern side by an exterior wall, so the house was wider.

The exterior wall is fairly thick, 0.7 m (2.3 ft) to 0.8 m (2.6 ft), constructed from rough-hewn limestone blocks, local proveniance. An upper floor was probably supported, which is further evidenced by a possible stairwell. The two interior rooms in the SE wing were too small for habitation: only 1.33 m (4.4 ft) and 1.67 m (5.5 ft) wide. They contained green schist paving stones forming a ramp on the rising ground, and were interpreted as risers that had fallen into the space below the staircase. Today not even the internal rooms are visible, and the schist has disappeared. The fact that the staircase is in a different wing suggests an add-on staircase similar to those in Minoan houses at Palaikastro. There the upper floors were used for ritual purposes.

The minimum possible area of two equal floors (but the house may have been split-level) might have been roughly 4000 square feet, not large enough for a Minoan public building (which were huge) but too large for a single humble family, hence the conclusion of the excavators that it was "an isolated private house", probably the villa of a substantial country farmer.

At the time of discovery, the excavators reported a dense brushwood in the vicinity. This would have been the larger palm forest before it was demolished. Still, the farmland of the villa could have been further out in the valley, perhaps even the distant ancestor of Vai farm. The house was located on the slope of a hill at the edge of the coastal hill zone.

== Contention over the future of the cape ==
Toplou Monastery has a long tradition of proactivity in business and politics. They slowly built up land ownership on the cape and did not hesitate to start businesses on it to provide themselves with an operating budget. They built windmills, started a farm (Vai Farm), and maintained fields and facilities to manufacture wine and olive oil. With the proceeds they had the money for charitability, operating a free school for the local inhabitants, and maintaining a hostel, dining facility, museum, and whatever else seemed most appropriate.

As the post-war decades rolled on, their orientation changed from primarily caretaker to primarily business. They began making decisions that were highly profitable but disastrous to the environment and cultural sites, such as clearing out the majority of Vai palm forest in favor of arable cropland. These decisions came to the attention of a new generation of scientists and responsible governmentalists, whose first reaction was to sequester monastery land by turning it into parkland. From this sequestration an issue arose over whose land it really was, and whether the owner could dispose of it as he pleases, in conformance with the legal concept of property.

The monastery brought the case to a final test by leasing land to a British development corporation, Minoan Group. They were interested in capitalizing on the recreational value of the cape, planning to build hotels, a golf course, and various other recreational facilities. They started in the Vai area. Having obtained the licenses they required from local government, they began work in 2006, bulldozing parts of Vai farm to create a parking lot to which they planned to bus large numbers of tourists. The monastery would receive a percentage of the profits.

Opinion in Crete and elsewhere now became polarized. Some people believed that development of otherwise fallow land for recreational and business purposes was a good thing. They had the weight of the famous monastery behind them. Others wished to conserve the rare species, unusual terrain, and extensive archaeological sites intact. They had the scientists behind them. A general protest and lawsuit was brought by the citizenry in the Cavo Sidero dispute, which ended in the Supreme Administrative Court. In 2008 The court found in favor of the plaintiffs on the grounds that the developers had failed to investigate the ecological impact adequately. Work on the project was halted.

The first match of the contest for profitability had been lost, but all was not lost. Minoan Group emended their plan, submitting a scaled-down version that emphasized water sports rather than land sports, which they called Itanos Gaia. In opposition, the archaeologists, Oliver Rackham and Jennifer Moody, obtained a petition with 11,000 signatures from persons in many countries, asking for a remission against the threat to the countryside.

In short, the petition did not achieve the winning acceptance. A presidential decree of July 3, 2016, approved Itanos Gaia, and was followed immediately by a request for an annulment on the grounds that the project would degrade the environment and quality of life in Lasithi, and for a number of technicalities the decree was actually illegal. In 2017 the Supreme Court rejected the request, siding with the legality of the decree, and bringing up some technicalities of its own, such as that the applicants had not proved they were residents of Lasithi. The Minoan Group was now free to proceed. Having gone heavily into debt it could not proceed without an inflow of fresh money. Most recently (2022) it has been advertising for new investors. If it cannot obtain them the project will be a bubble, a large-scale financial disaster. If it can obtain them, conservation of the cape will enter a new phase.

== Reference bibliography ==
- Boydak, M. (2019). "A new subspecies of Phoenix theophrasti Greuter (Phoenix theophrasti Greuter subsp. golkoyana Boydak) from Turkey" (PDF). Forestist. 69 (2): 133–144. doi:10.26650/forestist.2019.19016. S2CID 202013176.
- Driessen, Jan; Knappett, Carl (2014). "The Late Minoan I building at Vai (Crete)" (PDF). Bulletin de correspondance hellénique. 138 (2): 451–466. doi:10.3406/bch.2014.8030.
- El-Kady, Marwa (2009). "Concept of the Representation of Palm Branches in Alexandrian Tombs" (PDF). دراسات في آثار الوطن العربي (Studies in the Archeology of the Arab World). 12 (12): 12–37.
- IUCN (1987). Protected Landscapes: Experience Around the World (PDF). International Union for Conservation of Nature and Natural Resources.
- Mackridge, Peter (2020). "31. Toplou". The Crete of R.M. Dawkins (1903-1919). Oxford: University of Oxford.
- Rackham, Oliver; Moody, Jennifer (2012). "4.3 Drivers of Change and the Landscape History of Cavo Sidero". In Papayannis, Thymio; Howard, Peter (eds.). Reclaiming the Greek Landscape (PDF). Athens: Mediterranean Institute for Nature and Anthropos (Med-INA).
- Theophrastus (1916). An Enquiry into plants. The Loeb Classical Library. Vol. I. Translated by Arthur Hort.
