= Plakias =

Plakias Πλακιάς
- Settlement
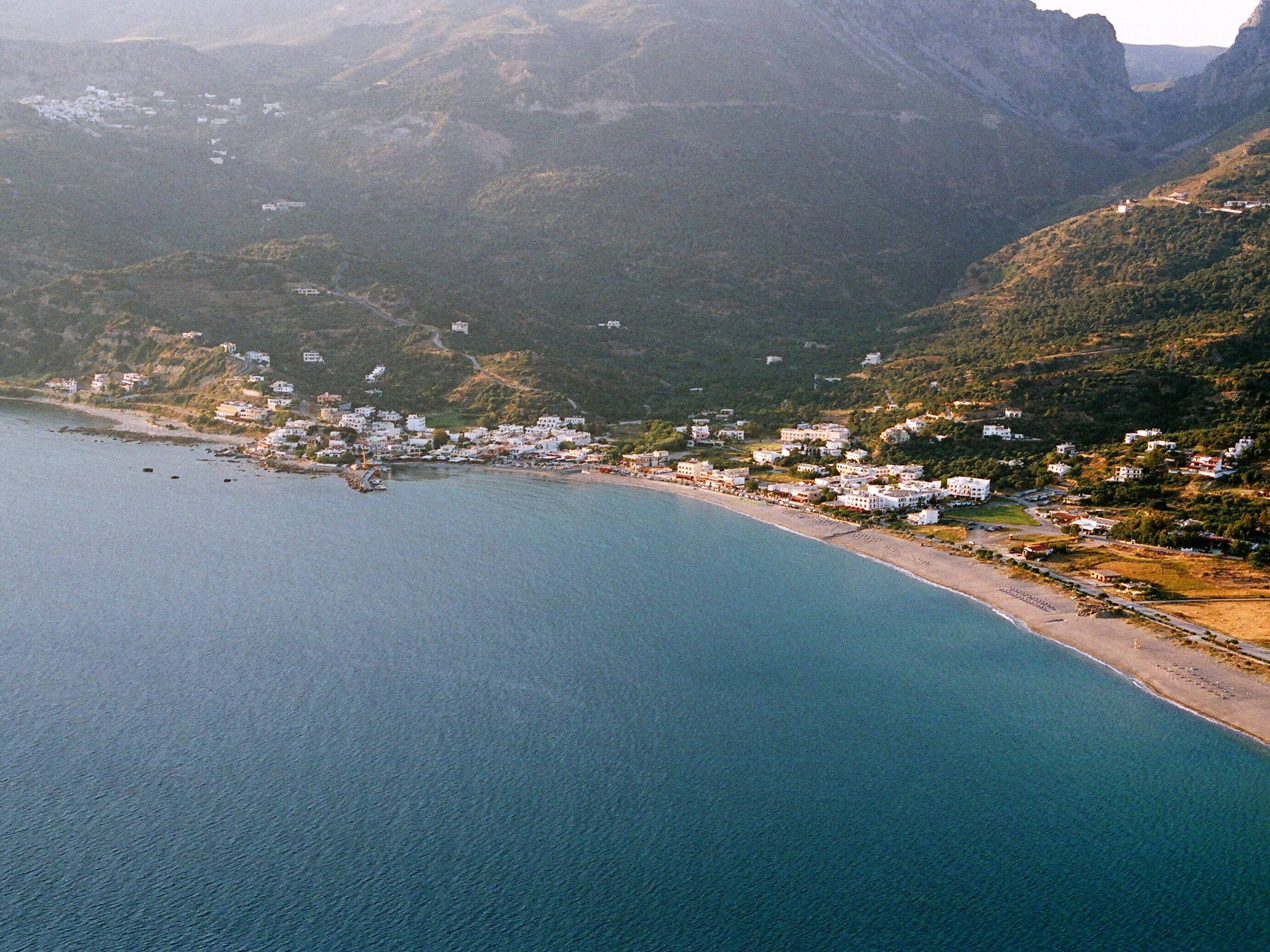
- Plakias

- Location within the regional unit

- Location within Greece
- Coordinates: 35.19153°N 24.39545°E
- Country: Greece
- Administrative region: Crete
- Regional unit: Rethymno
- Municipality: Agios Vasileios
- Time zone: UTC+2 (EET)
  - Summer (DST): UTC+3 (EEST)
- Vehicle registration: ΡΕ

Plakias (Greek: Πλακιάς) is a village on the south coast of the Greek island of Crete, in the Rethymno regional unit, about 21 kilometres south of the city of Rethymno. It is part of the municipality Agios Vasileios. It is surrounded by mountains to the north and the Libyan Sea to the south.

== Name ==
The name in Greek means "flat", because the town stands on an alluvial fan of material that has washed down the Kotsifou gorge directly to the north. This material has formed along the sea's edge into a long, fine, gold-hued sand beach, which shelves very gradually out into the bay.

== History ==
Initially just a fishing jetty and a few houses, Plakias developed during the last few decades into a tourist resort. The first official mention of Plakias was in 1961, when it was recorded in a census as the permanent home of six fishermen. The recorded history of surrounding mountain villages like Myrthios and Sellia goes back to the 10th century, when the Byzantine Emperor Nikephoros II Phokas (961 AD) built roads and bridges in order to link those villages, and there are some fragments of wall remaining from a fortified area on a hill top just northeast of the present main town. The local area is geographically suitable for a settlement, having plenty of agricultural space, and there may well have been a settlement there since Minoan times.

== Transportation ==
Plakias can be reached by bus from Rethymno and Preveli. Small boats provide access to some of the nearby beaches, like Preveli Beach, which is also known as Palm Beach.

== Beaches, Hiking and Natural Heritage ==
Plakias Beach is a 1.5 km developed section of narrow crushed shell beach. Nearby beaches include Damnoni, which is also accessible by small boat, Ammoudi, Skinaria, and Souda. Hiking is also a popular activity, with loop hikes passing to nearby villages and beaches.

Paligremnos Rock, a popular climbing destination, and the beach below have been protected as a Monument of Natural and Cultural Heritage since 2023, following a campaign opposing a proposed resort development that would have restricted access to the climbing area.

== Gallery ==
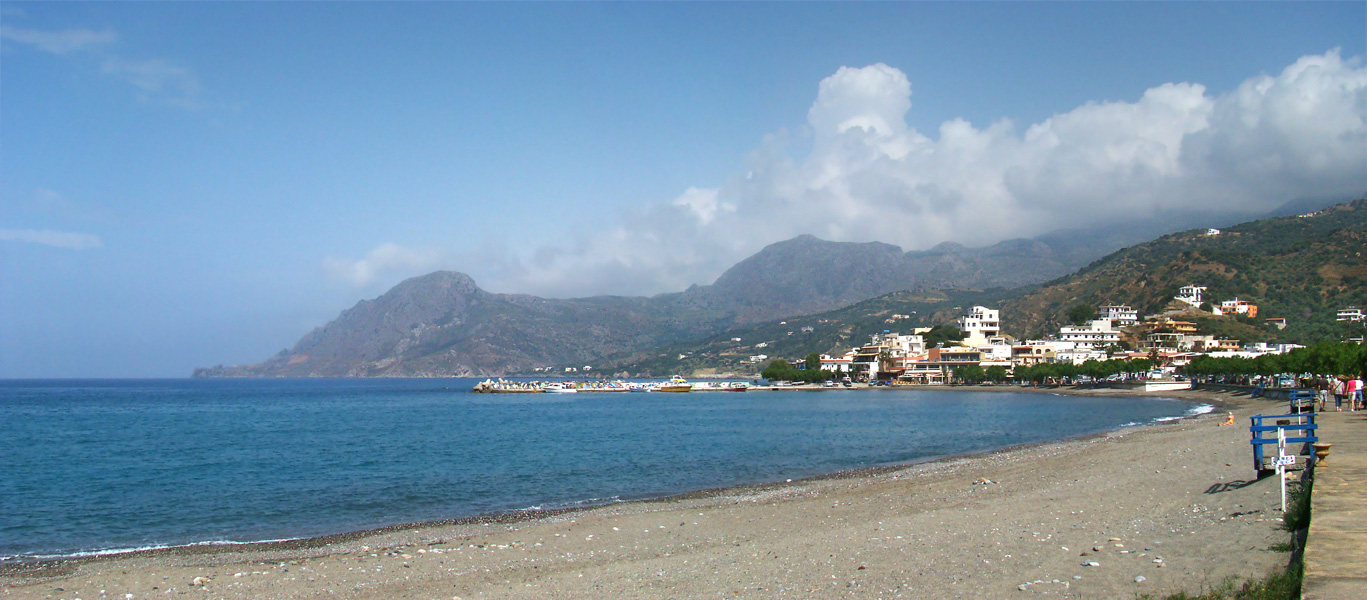
Plakias beach
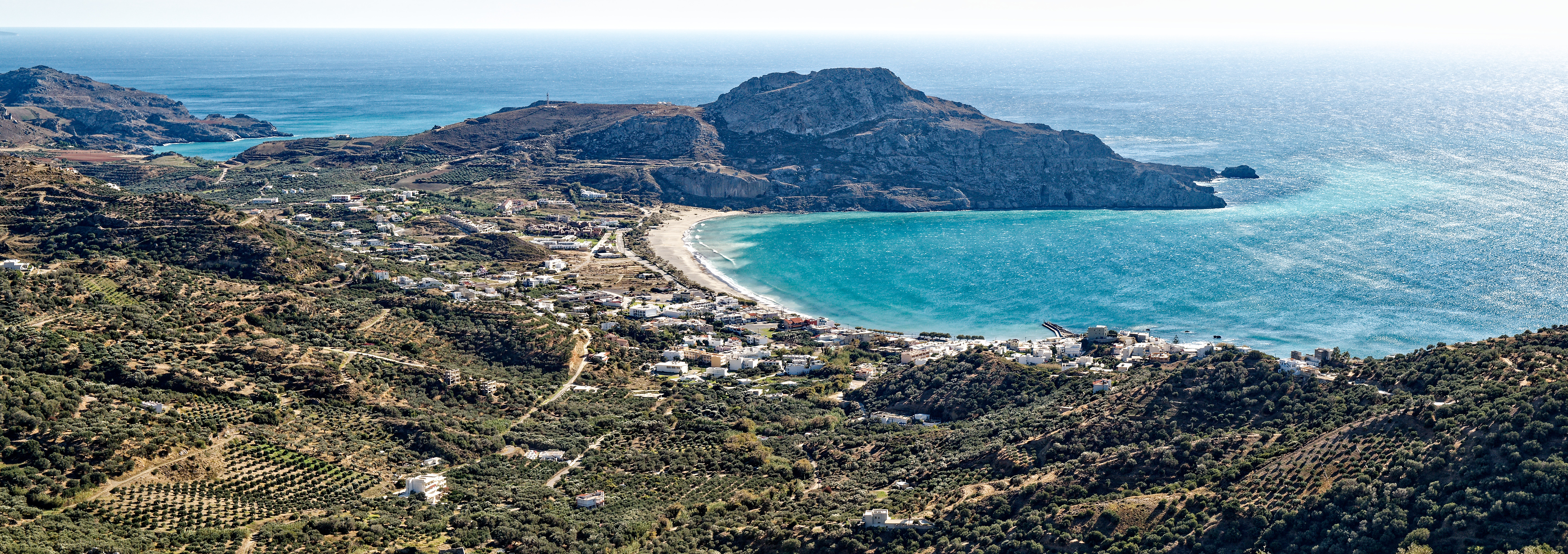
Panorama of Plakias
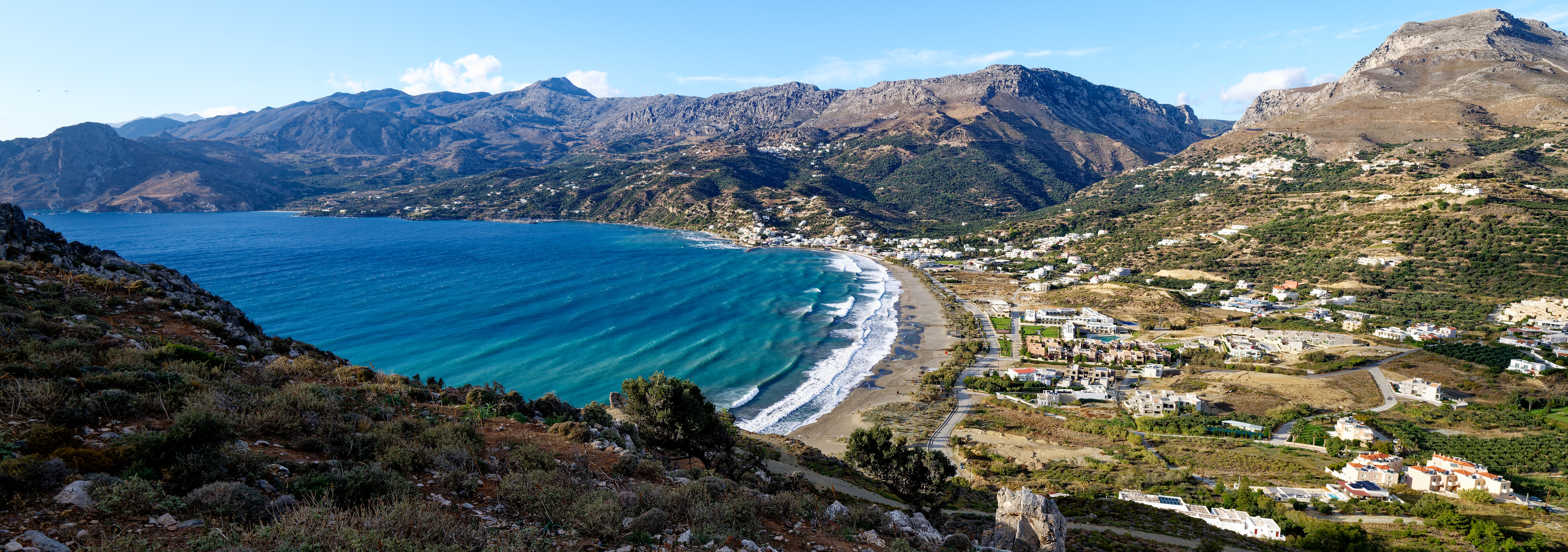
Panorama of Plakias - from the opposite viewpoint
