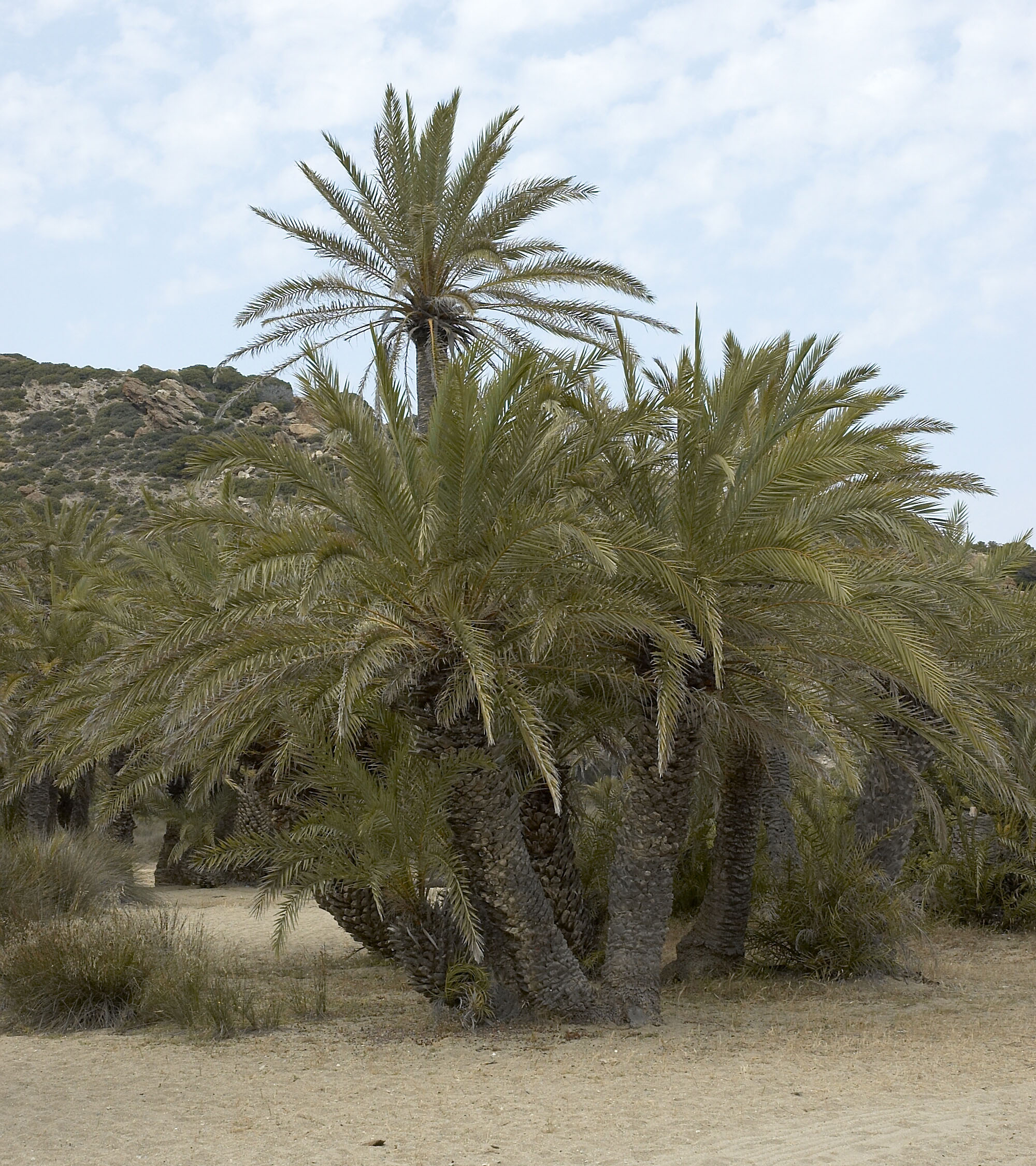
- Cretan date palm at the beach in Vai, Crete

Conservation status
- Near Threatened (IUCN 2.3)

Scientific classification
- Kingdom: Plantae
- Clade: Tracheophytes
- Clade: Angiosperms
- Clade: Monocots
- Clade: Commelinids
- Order: Arecales
- Family: Arecaceae
- Genus: Phoenix
- Species: P. theophrasti

Binomial name
- Phoenix theophrasti Greuter
- ⏺ Isolated native population

= Phoenix theophrasti =

Species of palm

Phoenix theophrasti, the Cretan date palm, is a palm native to the eastern Mediterranean, in the southernmost points of Greece and Turkey. It, along with Chamaerops humilis (the European fan palm) are the only native palm species in the Mediterranean basin; areas forested with these species constitute Europe's only palm forests. Similarly in Turkey, it is the only native palm species; all other species—although much more common—are introduced.

== Taxonomy ==
The specific epithet theophrasti was chosen by the Swiss botanist Werner Greuter in 1967 from the fact that Theophrastus, the ancient Greek "father of botany", had described several types of palms, including one from Crete.

A genomic study from New York University Abu Dhabi Center for Genomics and Systems Biology showed that domesticated date palm (Phoenix dactylifera) varieties from North Africa, including well-known varieties such as Medjool and Deglet Noor, are a hybrid between Middle East date palms and P. theophrasti.

== Description ==
Apart from the usually inedible dates and upright fruit clusters, the Cretan species can appear quite similar to the cultivated date.

Phoenix theophrasti grows up to 15 m (49 ft) tall, usually with several slender stems. The leaves are pinnate, 2–3 m (6.6–9.8 ft) long, with numerous rigid greyish-green linear leaflets 15–50 cm (6–20 in) long on each side of the central rachis. Dead leaves are marcescent, remaining attached to the stem for years after withering. The fruit is an oval yellowish-brown drupe 1.5 cm (0.6 in) long and 1 cm (0.4 in) diameter and containing a single large seed. The fruit pulp is too thin and fibrous to be of agricultural significance and has an acrid taste, though the fruits are sometimes eaten by the locals.

== Distribution ==
The species has a relatively restricted distribution, mostly confined to southern Greece (a few sites on Crete and nearby islands), as well as some places on the Turkish coast.

=== Greece ===
Sites on Crete include Vai in the Lasithi Prefecture, Ayios Nikitas in Heraklion Prefecture, and Preveli gorge and Souda near Plakias, both on the south coasts of Crete in Rethymnon Prefecture. Trees are also found on Amorgos island, on Halki Island, and on the south coast of Anafi island. Recently, around 10 trees, the only natural stand on the mainland, were found in an ancient palm forest in the Epidaurus area in Peloponnese. It has been proposed that its range was much more widespread in Ancient Greece, growing from Crete to Thebes and from the Peloponnese to Delos.

=== Turkey ===
Its presence in Turkey was not described scientifically until the 1980s. There are four stands in southwest Turkey, especially on the Datça and Bodrum Peninsulas in Muğla Province and in Kumluca-Karaöz in Finike Bay. The plants form a grove in the village of Gölköy in northern Bodrum are considered by some as a subspecies, having a shorter stem (4–8 m) but longer fruit stalks (0.6–2 m).

== References and external links ==
- Davis, P. H., ed. (1965-1985). Flora of Turkey. Edinburgh.
- Phoenix theophrasti – information, genetic conservation units and related resources. European Forest Genetic Resources Programme (EUFORGEN)
