= Preveli =

Location in Crete, Greece

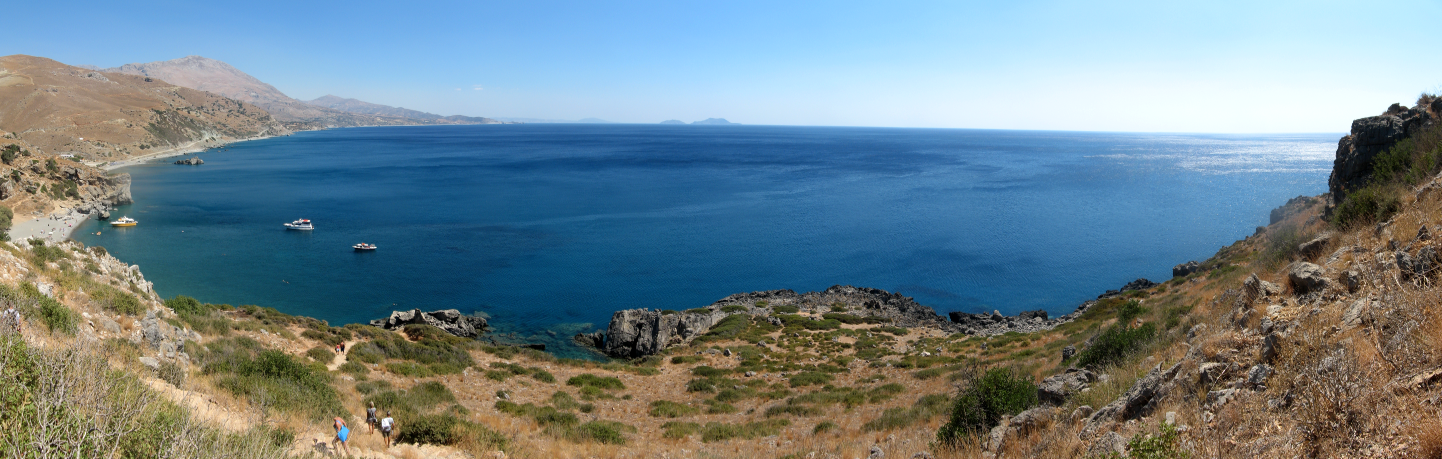
A view of Preveli beach, looking towards the Libyan Sea

Preveli (Greek: Πρέβελη) is a location on the south coast of the Greek island of Crete, in the Rethymno region, notable for its monastery.

== Preveli Monastery ==
Monastery of Preveli
- Μονή Πρέβελη
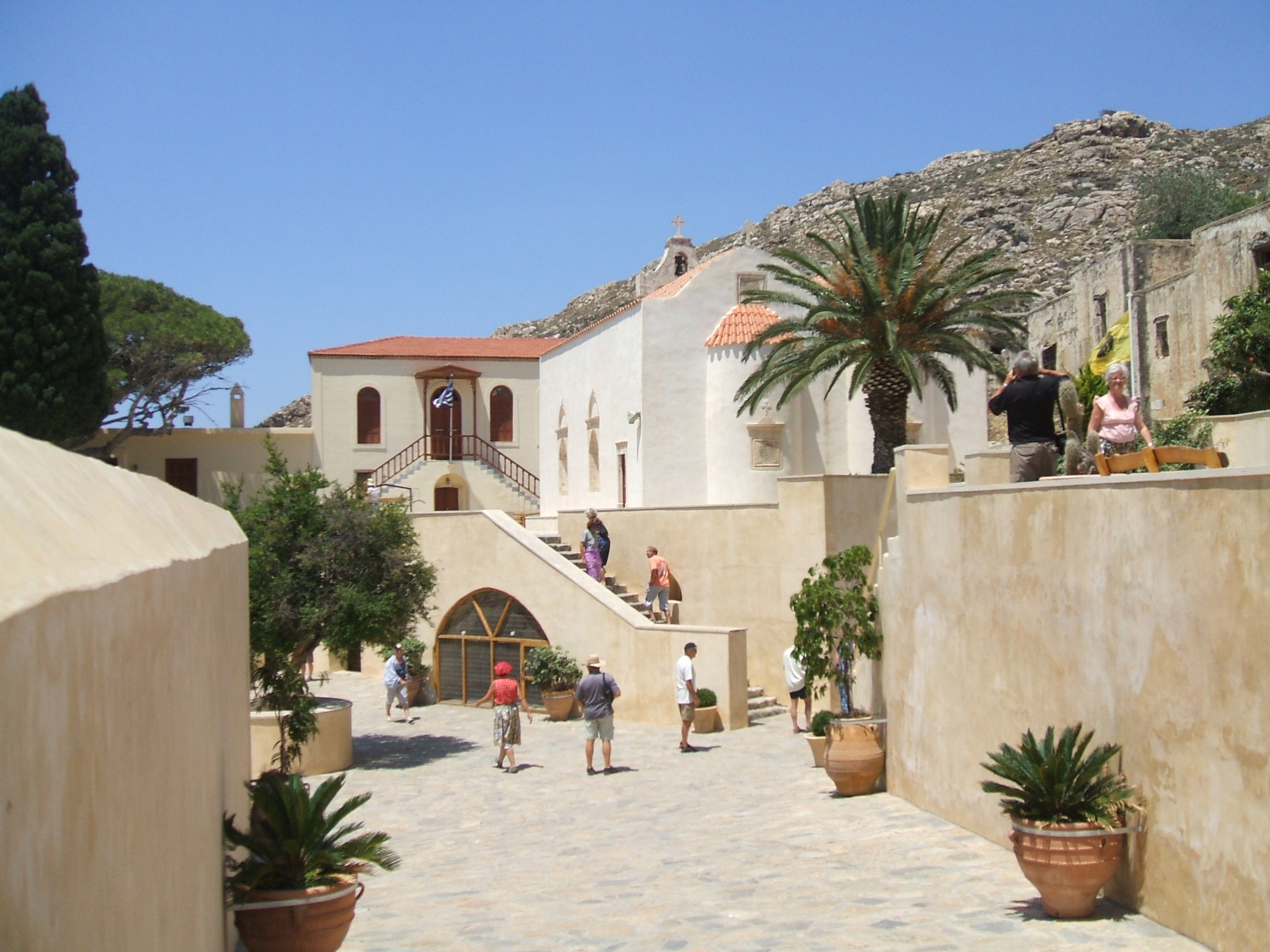

- Location of the monastery in Crete
- Interactive map of Monastery of Preveli

Monastery information
- Full name: Holy Stavropegiac and Patriarchal Preveli Monastery of St. John the Theologian
- Order: Ecumenical Patriarchate of Constantinople
- Denomination: Greek Orthodox
- Dedication: St. John the Theologian
- Archdiocese: Church of Crete

Architecture
- Status: Monastery
- Functional status: Active
- Completed date: Middle Ages

Site
- Location: Preveli, Rethymno, Crete
- Country: Greece
- Coordinates: 35°9.454′N 24°27.3765′E
- Website: preveli.org

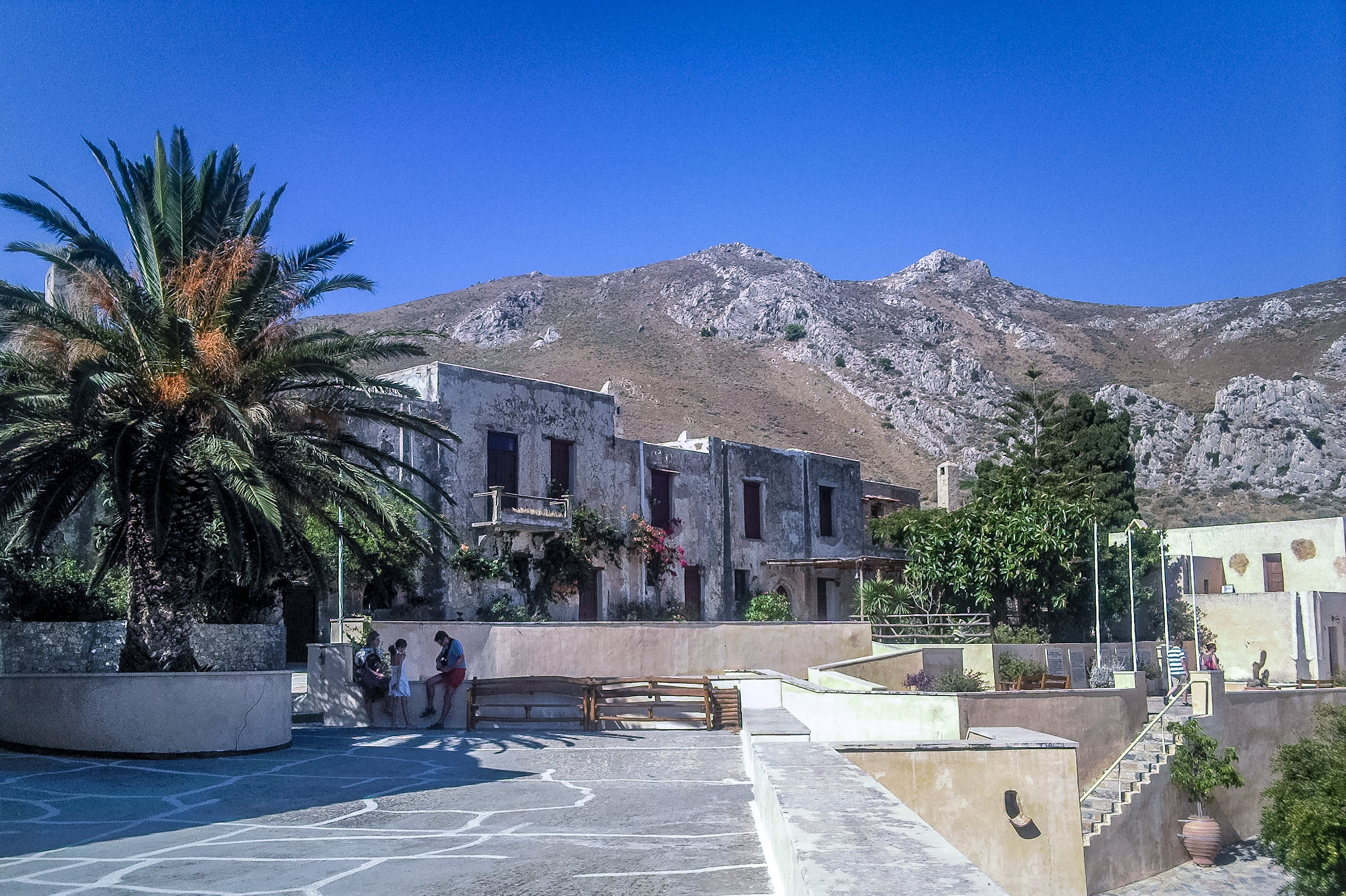
Piso (rear) view of the active monastery

The Monastery of Preveli (Greek: Μονή Πρέβελη), officially the Holy Stavropegiac and Patriarchal Preveli Monastery of St. John the Theologian, comprises a Greek Orthodox monastery spread over two main building complexes, the ruined lower monastery of St. John the Baptist, and the currently operational upper (rear) monastery of St. John the Theologian.

The monastery was probably founded in the Middle Ages, during the occupation of Crete by the Republic of Venice, its founder being a feudal lord named Prevelis. It developed over several centuries as a religious and cultural centre for the local population. After the Ottoman Turkish occupation of the island, Abbot Melchissedek Tsouderos led a group of rebels in the Greek War of Independence in 1821, one result of which was that the monastery was destroyed, but later rebuilt. In 1866 and 1878, the monastery was again active in organising rebellions against the Turks, which helped contribute to Crete's eventual independence and then its political union with Greece.

In the Battle of Crete in 1941, Agathangelos Lagouvardos helped supply British, Australian, and New Zealand troops on the island, and provided shelter for them. A group of Australian soldiers protected by the monastery managed to secure their rescue by submarine from the island at Preveli Beach. After this was discovered, the Lower Monastery was destroyed by German forces.

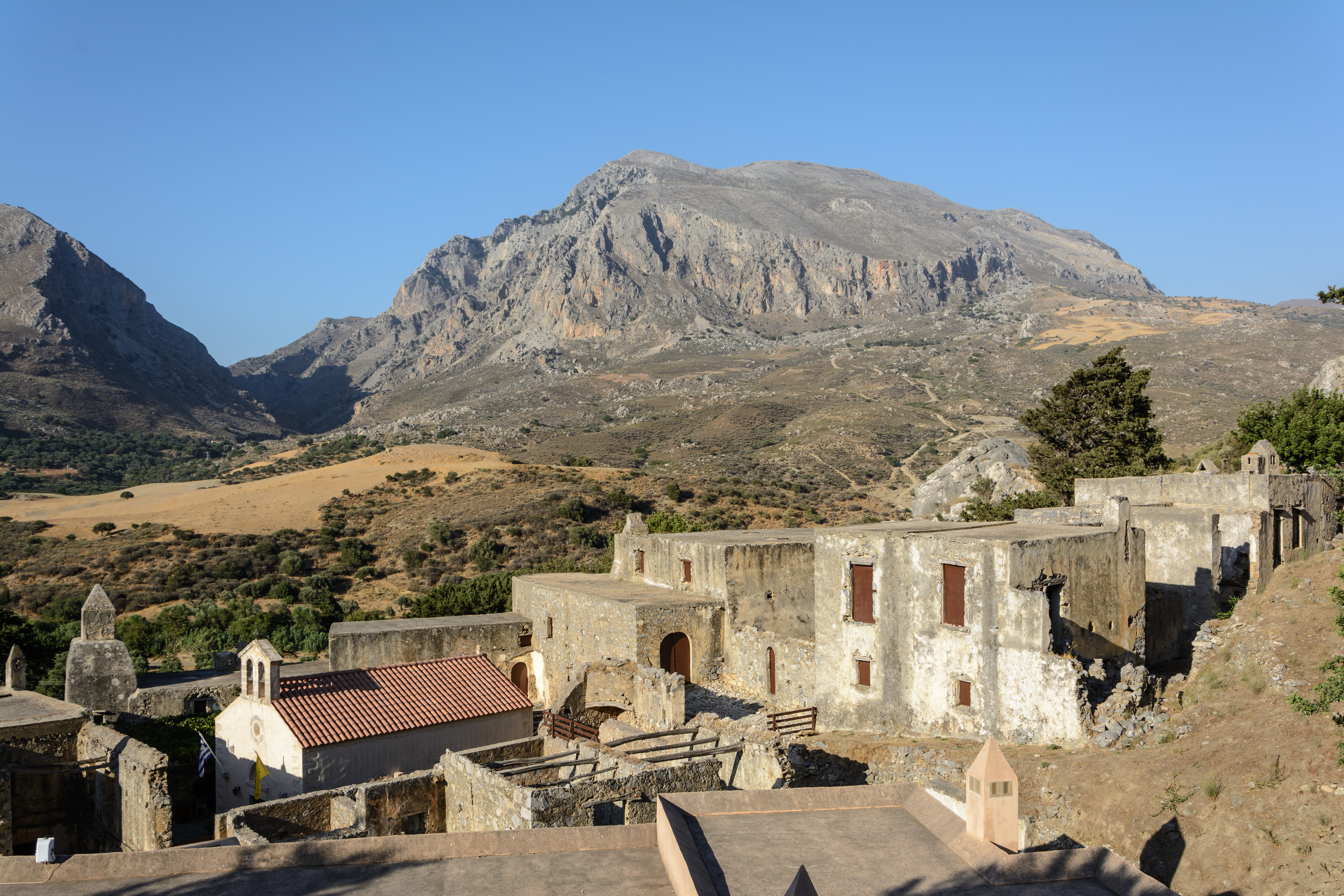
Kato (lower) view of the monastery ruins

The upper monastery contains numerous religious relics and icons, and many of its buildings, now heavily restored, are open to the public. There are also a number of monuments to the work of the monastery during the Second World War, many of them financed by rescued Australian former soldiers. Among the Allied soldiers to receive shelter and assistance from the Monastery of Preveli during WWII was Australian Corporal Geoff Edwards. In commemoration, he settled the seaside hamlet of Margaret River in Western Australia calling it Prevelly. A small producer of premium wines from the Margaret River region also bears the name Preveli.

== Preveli Lagoon ==
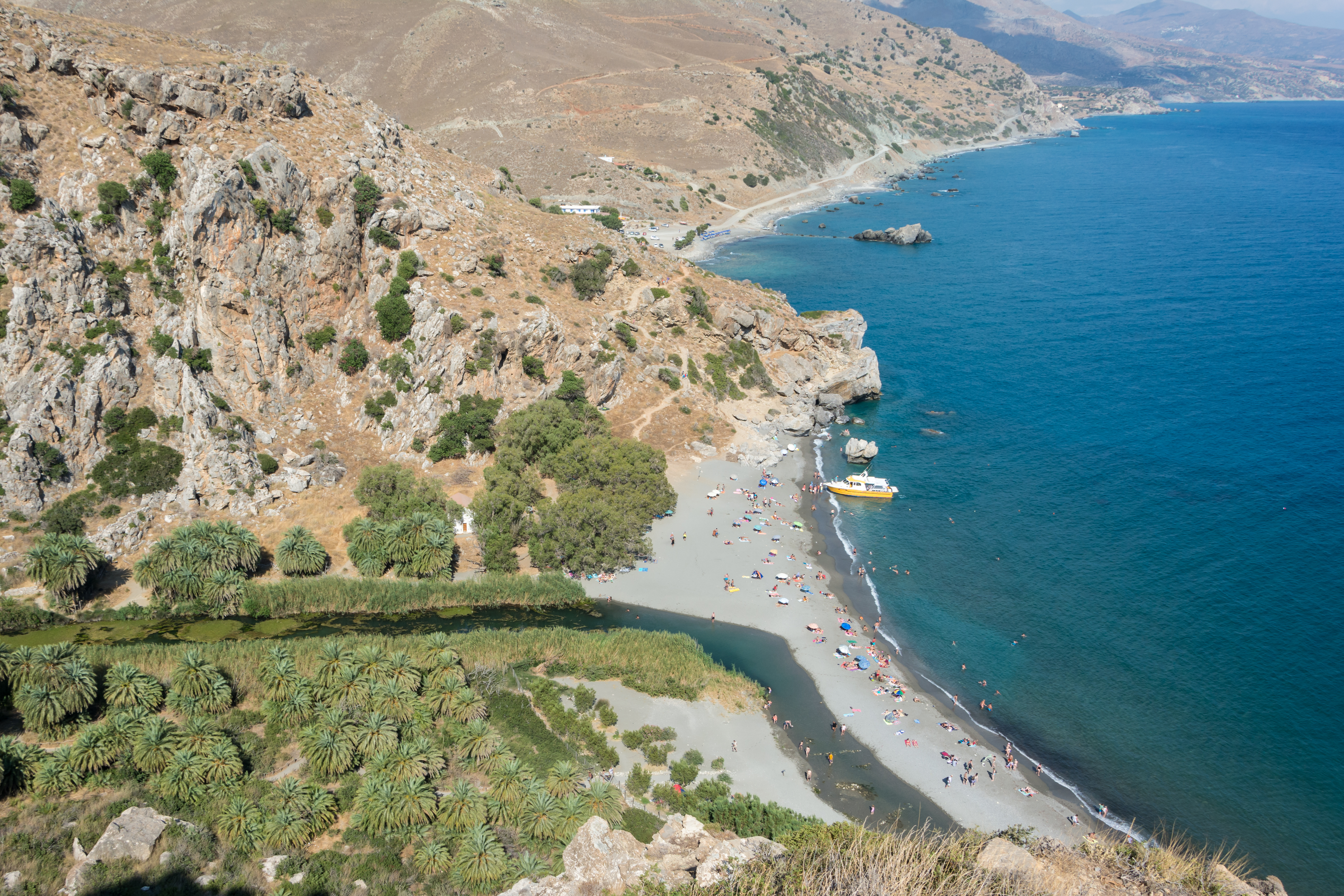
Preveli beach and lagoon in 2014

Preveli beach and lagoon (Greek: Λίμνη του Πρέβελη), sometimes known locally as "Palm Beach", is a lagoon and beach located below the monastery, at the mouth of the Kourtaliótiko gorge. Behind the beach is an extensive glade of palm trees Phoenix theophrasti, commonly known as Cretan Date Palm. According to a local legend, the King of Ithaca, Odysseus, remained in the wider area of Lake Preveli after the end of the Trojan War, on his return to Ithaca from Troy. The area is a popular tourist destination due to the river, the forest with palm trees in the gorge, and the sandy beach with clear waters. On the beach, there is a rock in the shape of a heart "The stone of lovers" according to the locals. The beach is regularly served by tourist boats from the nearby resort of Plakias. On August 22, 2010, a large proportion of the palm grove was destroyed in a fire but by 2011 had totally and rapidly naturally re-generated . There are many positive signs that P. theophrasti not only is able generally to re-generate successfully but the oldest and youngest palms of this palm forest, too, were totally re-generated by the summer of 2011.

== See also ==
- Church of Crete
- List of Greek Orthodox monasteries in Greece
