= Polichna (disambiguation) =

Polichna is a village in Poland.

Polichna (Ancient Greek: Πολίχνα) may also refer to:

- Polichna (Clazomenae), a town in ancient Ionia near Clazomenae, now in Turkey
- Polichna (Crete), a town in eastern ancient Crete, Greece
- Polichna (Ionia), a town in ancient Ionia, now in Turkey
- Polichna (Laconia), a town in ancient Laconia, Greece
- Polichna (Megaris), a town in ancient Megaris, Greece
- Polichna (Messenia), a town in ancient Messenia, Greece
- Polichna (Troad), a town in the ancient Troad, now in Turkey
- Polichna (Western Crete), a town in western ancient Crete, Greece

== See also ==
- Polichne (disambiguation)
