= Polichne =

Polichne (Ancient Greek: Πολίχνη) may refer to:

- Polichne (Chios), a town of ancient Chios, Greece
- Polichne (Crete), a town of ancient Crete, Greece
- Polichne (Ionia), a town of ancient Ionia, now in Turkey
- Polichne (Megaris), a town of ancient Megaris, Greece
- Polichne (Messenia), a town of ancient Messenia, Greece
- Polichne (Naxos), a town of ancient Naxos, Greece
- Polichne (Troad), a town of the ancient Troad, now in Turkey

== See also ==
- Polichna (disambiguation)
