= Dragmus =

Coordinates: 35°10′49″N 26°09′21″E

Dragmus or Dragmos (Greek: Δράγμος) was a town of ancient Crete. An inscription of Itanus is preserved showing the borders between Itanus and Dragmus, from which it is deduced that the territory of Dragmus had been absorbed by the city of Praesus. The terminus post quem of the absorption is situated around the years 270-260 BCE.

Its site is tentatively located near modern Kastri, Koutsoulopetres.
