= Stalae =

Stalae or Stalai (Ancient Greek: Στάλαι) was a town of ancient Crete. It is mentioned in a treaty between the town and Praesus dated to the beginning of the 3rd century BCE.

Its location is the subject of debate; two different sites have been proposed for its location: the ruins at Makry Gialos, and a site near Dasonari.
