= Itanus =

Archaeological site in East Crete, Greece

Coordinates: 35.2638°N 26.2630°E

Itanos
- Ἴτανος (Greek)
- Itanus (Latin)
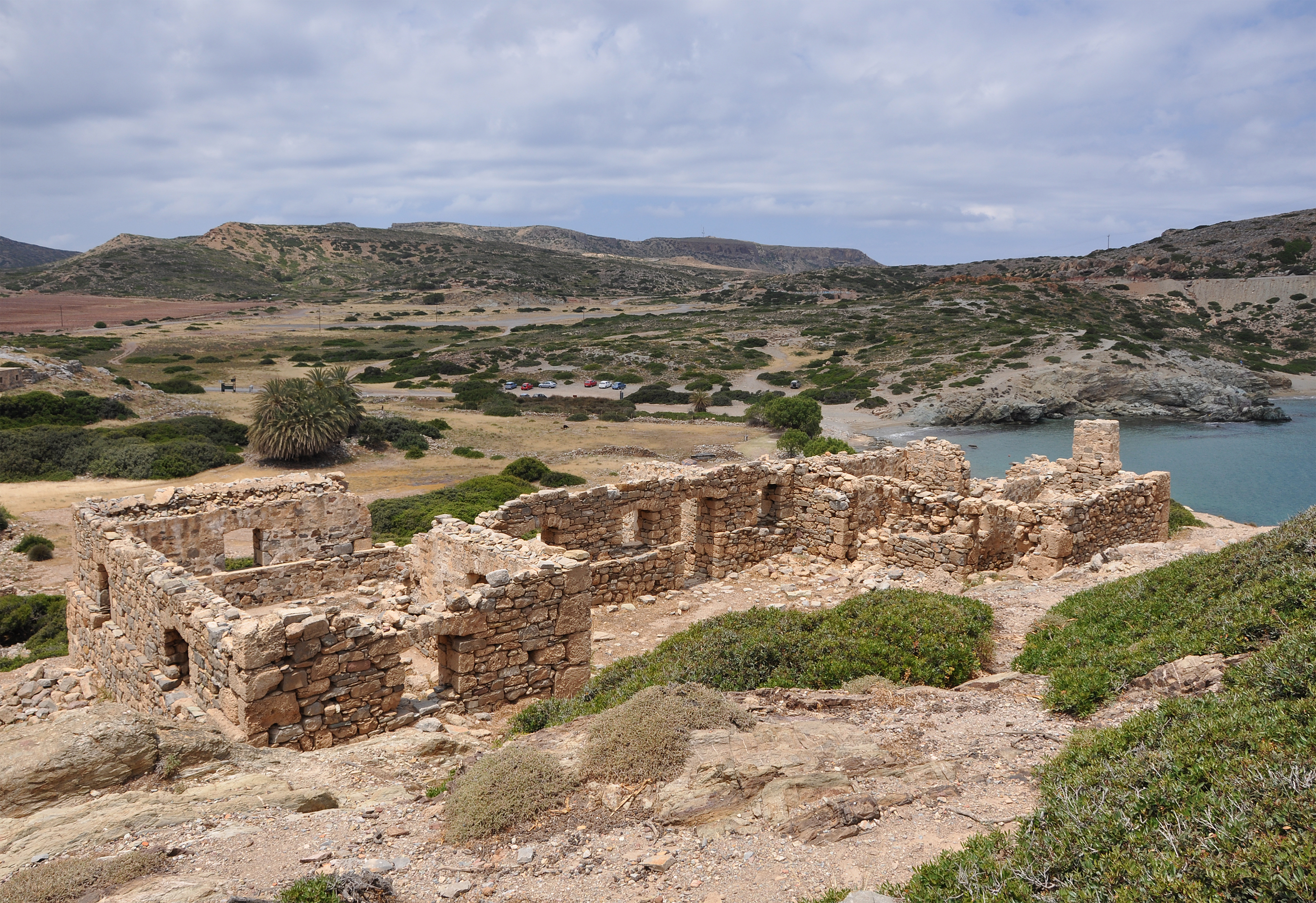
- Looking northward from the east akropolis over the beach and bay of Eremoupolis, with Itanos promontory in the background. The ground of the "deserted city" appears bare of vegetation except for overgrown mounds containing structural remains.

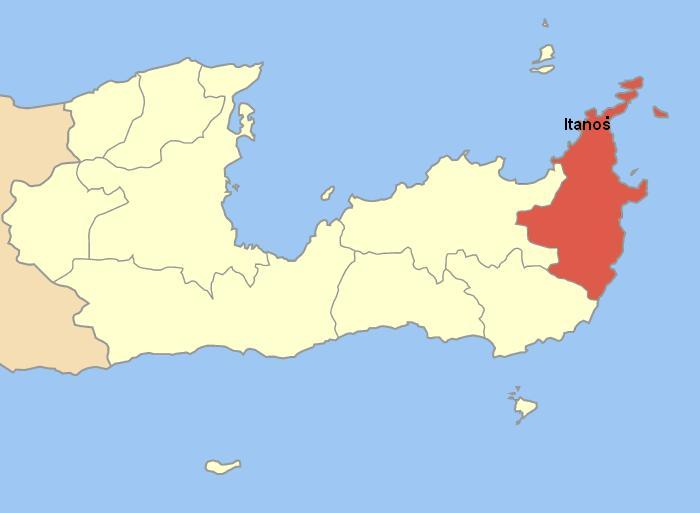
- Type: Ancient Greek port city
- Region: Lasithi Regional Unit; Sitia Municipality; Itanos Municipal Unit (2011)
- Part of: Cape Sidero promontory, NE Crete

Site notes
- Area: Maximum territory: 130 km^{2} (50 sq mi)
- Archaeologists: Primarily French School at Athens
- Discovered: 1884
- Condition: Subsurface ruins except for excavated features
- Owner: Hellenic Republic
- Management: 24th Ephorate of Prehistoric and Classical Antiquities (East Crete) (Note: Archaeological sites in Greece are national property, administered by the Archaeological Service, a branch of the Ministry of Culture and Sports. The Service divides its responsibility into regional "ephorates" marked by a number, such as the 24th, which has only a geographic meaning, not a temporal one. These names are generally shortened or paraphrased in the literature, such as "Lasithi Ephorate of Antiquities" or "l'Ephore des Antiquités de Siteia." In addition the Ephorate may create subunits, also called Ephoria, to administer specific sites.)
- Public access: Open

Itanus or Itanos (Ancient Greek: Ἴτανος) (Note: Ptolemy, Geography, Book III, Chapter XV lists "Itanos town" as a place on the south coast of Crete. Ptolemy's view is somewhat distorted. His east Crete runs from east to west around Cape Sidero and below it is on south Crete, with nothing being really east. The cape comes to a point. It is not entirely certain that his Itanos is the archaeological or historical site of Itanos, and his sequence of towns remains for the most part unknown. His Itanos, however, is next to Sammonium, or Cape Sidero, and may therefore be the historical one.) (Note: S. v. Itanos. Stephanus of Byzantium, Ethnika, is an alphabetic dictionary of place names. Itanos is "a city of Crete." He adds, esti kai akra; "It is also an akra," where akra can mean either "cape" or "citadel.") was a Greek city and port on the northeast coast of ancient Crete, on the promontory which the Romans called Itanum, the neuter form of Itanus, Latin for Greek Itanos. The base of the tripartite northeast promontory, today called Cape Sideros, is still called Itanos or Itano in modern Greek.

Occupation of the promontory began as early as the Final Neolithic, according to the archaeology. The site of the city itself, however, became inhabited in the Geometric Period of the 8th century BC. This city flourished independently of other Cretan powers, playing a leading role in the trade of the region, even becoming, for a while, a protectorate of Ptolemaic Egypt. It became part of the Roman province of Crete, and later Christian buildings were erected. For unclear reasons it was abandoned in the 7th century AD after a life of about 1400 years. The location was lost. Archaeologists were able to locate it in the 19th century. Recently it has become a subject in ground-breaking technologies of sub-surface surveying.

Some of the ruins of the classical and early Christian city are now visible in the elevations around Itanos and Eremoupolis Beaches, in the modern municipal unit of Itanos, of Sitia municipality. The east akropolis of the city was on the headland between the two beaches. The beach shown as Eremoupolis could not have appeared then as it does now, but the details have not yet been investigated scientifically. Itanos Beach on the other side went 100 yards further inland and was the deep channel of the harbor. Apparently, however, the east akropolis was not high enough or isolated enough to be a defensible fort.

== History ==
=== Bronze Age and earlier ===
The toponym u-ta-no, and the corresponding adjective, u-ta-ni-jo, appears on Linear B tablets found in Knossos. However Itanos seems to be too far away from Knossos to be u-ta-no, and J. Bennet ruled out the possibility that any Linear B tablets found at Knossos referred directly to classical Itanos.

The Itanos promontory, today nearly deserted, has 55 Bronze Age and Final Neolithic sites. A Minoan site at Itanos seemed theoretically possible, and yet the survey uncovered no Minoan material on or around the site at all. Instead all the Minoan farms, dams and lookouts seemed centered around “the villa of Vai,” a major site. The volcanic explosion of Santorini with tsunami destroyed civilization on the promontory. Life at Vai went on in LMIII with a diminished capacity, yet the settlement disappeared altogether in the Early Iron Age, to be replaced by an Itanos newly placed close to the shore in the 8th century BC during the Geometric Period.

=== Geometric, archaic, and classical periods ===
==== Herodotean first mention ====
Herodotus is the first Greek historian we know who mentioned Itanus. According to him, the Therans, when founding Cyrene, were indebted for their knowledge of the Libyan coast to Corobius, a seller of purple at Itanus.

==== Itanos and the geographers ====
According to Stephanos of Byzantium, Itanos was founded by Itanos, son of Phoenix, or a bastard son of one of the Kouretes.

==== Coins of Itanus ====
Some of the coins of this city present the type of a woman terminating in the tail of a fish.

=== Hellenistic period ===
Ancient Itanus was one of the most powerful cities in Crete in Hellenistic times owing to geography and a flourishing trade. The city controlled a vast territory that stretched from Cape Samonio (Cape Sidero today) on the north tip of Crete to Cape Erythrae (Cape Goudouras) on the far-southeast tip of the island.

The importance of Itanos can be seen in the city's issuance of its own currency, as well as in many significant ruins. The capital of the greater regional power, Itanus had the temples of Asclepius, Athena, Tyche, and Zeus, and was a historic rival of both Praesus and Ierapetra (Ierapytna).

==== The Hellenistic inscriptions of Itanus ====
Many Greek inscriptions were found in situ; the most famous one, kept now in the monastery of Toplou, relates a decision by the Roman Senate about Itanos' conflicts and territorial disputes with the neighbor cities Praisos and Hierapytna.

== Archaeological site ==
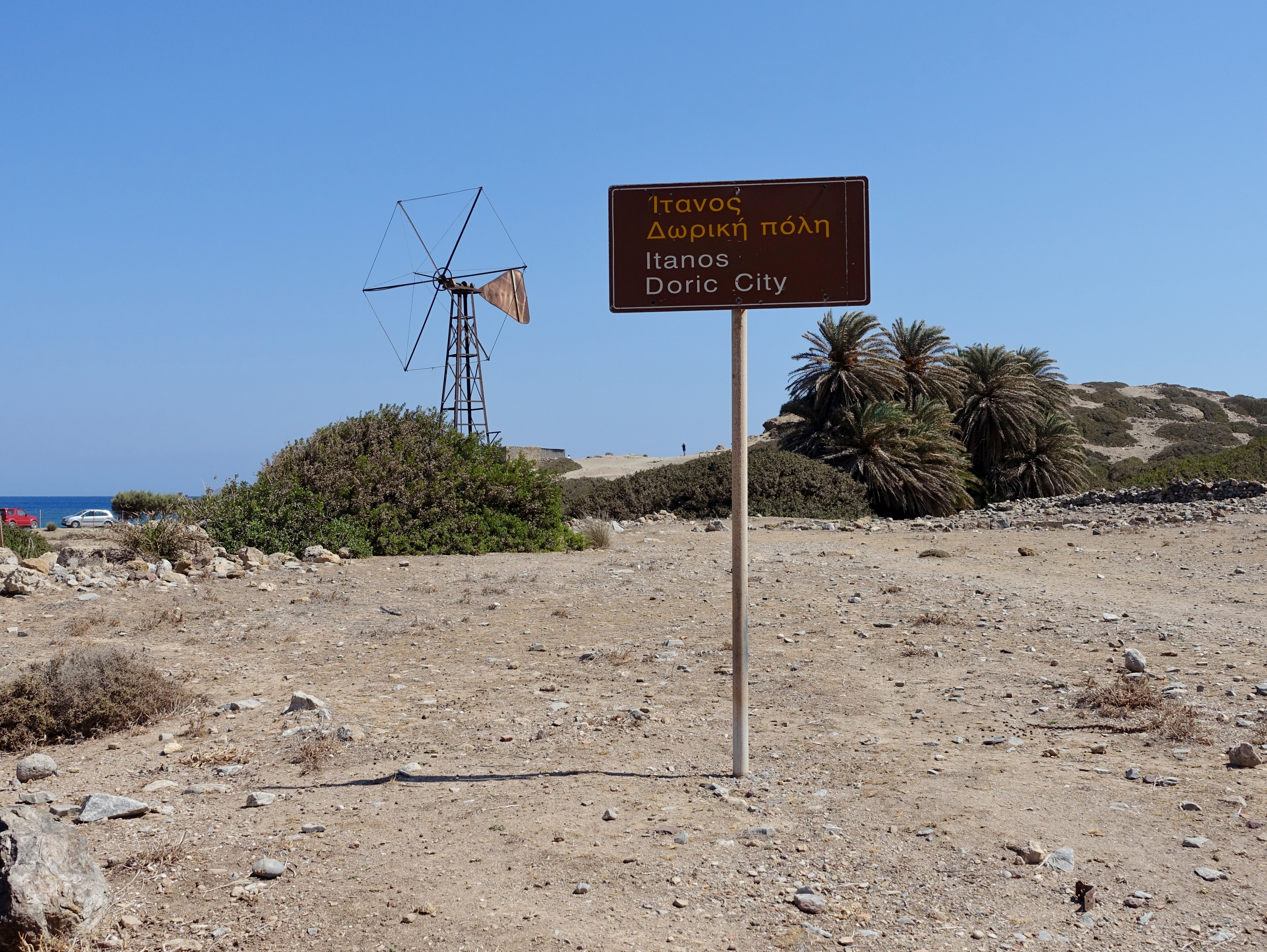
Entrance to the site.

The archeological site of Itanos is open to the public. It is possible to see the ruins of structures, city walls and Christian churches.

=== History of archaeological investigation ===
==== British mission ====
In 1852 HMS Spitfire surveyed the coasts of Crete under the direction of Captain Thomas Abel Brimage Spratt, resulting in Admiralty Chart No. 2536b, eastern Crete, one of the first of the accurate maps (see below under Maps). It notes the location of Eremoupolis, which it suggests might be Arsinoe or Etera, two pseudo-ancient toponyms.

Writing of his travel experiences Spratt interprets Eremoupoli as “desert city,” because “wild and neglected,” identifying it with a name from a manuscript as Etera. He says that he saw “inscriptions, old churches, tombs, and ruins.” The ruins “extend over the hills and slopes which overlook two small bays.” He then proceeds to enumerate most of the ruins as they were found in the archaeological site: the city wall to the south, the two akropoleis, the buildings between them, the churches. He found and copied inscriptions. The monks of Toplou Monastery cued him as to where they were. These monks had exposed them in superficial digging and then had covered them up again.

==== Italian mission ====
For four years, 1884–1887, the Italian government financed a mission to central and eastern Crete under the direction of Domenico Comparetti, then minister of public instruction. He did not go himself, but sent a then student, Federico Halbherr, to take command. They were both epigraphists.

The Gortyn code had been turning up piecemeal at Gortyn. A number of other agencies were on-site. At first Halbherr worked with them to recover and restore the code, completing the task in 1884. He then carried the mission to eastern Crete, hiking over the terrain, looking for inscriptions. He reported in 1891: “These researches extended from the province of Rettimo … as far as the furthermost eastern part of the island, exploring as it were foot by foot the soil of about two-thirds of Crete, and carrying out the first real systematic excavations.” Toplou Monastery owned northeastern Crete. Halbherr discovered that the monks were removing inscriptions from Erimoupolis. Dissatisfied, he sought and received permission to examine them. He had read Spratt, who had also removed inscriptions from there and had turned them over to the Fitzwilliam Museum of Cambridge. (Note: Spratt was following the orders of his commander, Francis Beaufort, chief of the Hydrography Office of the Royal Navy, to “Pick up inscriptions and antiquities.” Moore, Dudley. "Thomas Spratt: 19th century Antiquarian traveller to Crete". Academia.)

Halbherr happened to arrive at Toplou just as a fresh batch of inscriptions from Erimoupolis was being sorted. Of those known to be from that location and those that had been left in place he found five mentioning Itanos and the Itanoi: “Only in 1884 a large number of epigraphical monuments collected and copied by me, partly in situ, partly in the monastery of Toplu, whither they had been recently carried, have enabled the site of the ancient city of Itanos to be definitively identified with the ruins of Erimopolis, …. Admiral Spratt, … was not lucky enough to find a single one bearing the name of the ancient city; whereas at the present day … we possess five….” This statement is universally accepted as the archaeological identification of Itanos.

In a follow-up article Halbherr translates Erimoupolis as "deserted city" based on what appeared to be its fate. He was the first to perceive the city plan: "Two hills, of which the highest" (East Akropolis) " juts out into the sea ... form two centres, from which gradually arose ... the ancient city, which occupied the lower ground" (Habitation quarter). Like Spratt, he goes over the ruins, concentrating on the Necropolis, or cemetery, on a hill to the north, from which most of the inscriptions had come. The Italian mission ended in 1887. Now a respected archaeological peer in Crete, Halbherr went on to work for the Americans and British in other excavations of East Crete, but never came back to Itanos, although he did collaborate on the inscriptions.

==== French missions ====
The Cretan Insurrection of 1897 and subsequent intervention of the International Squadron with formation of interim non-Ottoman governments released the archaeologists from any requirement to seek or abide by Ottoman firmans (permissions). A competition for sites ensued. French troops had landed in Eastern Crete. The British Archaeological School had firmans for Goulas and Itanos. In 1898 J. Demargne of the French School of Archaeology occupied the two sites and demanded permission to excavate from the provisional government. The British, interested in other sites, such as Knossos, yielded gracefully to keep the peace. Demargne excavated the basilicas, or churches, of Itanos in 1899–1900. He was mainly interested in inscriptions, but before he could publish them, he grew ill, and in 1911 turned them over to A.J. Reinach. Meanwhile, the site lay as he had left it for 50 years.

By 1950 the concept of Minoan civilization had been developed from remains at Knossos and elsewhere. A new generation of archaeologists at the French School decided to investigate Itanos for the presence of Minoan remains, which would suggest that "a major bronze age site" had preceded the one in evidence. The evidence did not go in that direction: "... en 1950, ... Hubert Gallet de Santerre, André Dessenne et Jean Deshayes tentèrent en vain d’y découvrir un site majeur de l’Âge du Bronze." The JHS reported: "The remains on the ancient acropolis have suffered very serious injury ... pottery ranging from Protogeometric to Hellenistic has come to light, but without clear stratification; ...." From the East Akropolis they proceeded to the Habitation Quarter: "In the lower town the remains of ancient habitation are covered by extensive construction of the Christian era ...." In a hurry now, because nothing they found would justify a second season, performing abbreviated excavation of the necropolis they thought they had located a single building they called the "Grand Tombeau." They did not return.

==== The collaborative missions ====
Previous archaeology had left many questions unresolved. In 1994 the Greek Archaeological Service, acting through its branch for East Crete, the 24th Ephoria (or Ephoreia, or Ephorate) of Prehistoric (or Prehistorical) and Classical Antiquities agreed with archaeological peers at the Ecole française d'Athènes and other institutions in Crete that what was needed was "un portrait le plus complet possible de l'histoire, de la topographie et de l'organisation spatiale de cette petite cité crétoise," to be acquired in "un programme de recherches archéologiques," further defined as "un projet scientifique interdisciplinaire" and "une collaboration internationale."

===== Itanos Archaeological Survey =====
The first part of the project, which began in 1994 as a collaboration between the Ephorate, the French School, and the Institute of Mediterranean Studies of Rethymno, (Note: The full name is Institute of Mediterranean Studies of the Foundation for Research and Technology Hellas, with offices at Rethymno. The abbreviation of the second part of the name, FORTH, is often used in the literature to mean the Institute.) is usually termed "The Itanos Archaeological Survey" (La prospection d’Itanos). The decision to survey was based on a land settlement arbitration recorded in a public inscription found in Hellenistic Itanos (Note: This is the inscription now fixed into the doorway of the church at Toplou Monastery.) specifying that the city was sovereign over the entire northeast promontory from Cape Sideros to Karoumes Beach south of Cape Plaka, westward to the mountains of East Crete, a total area of 130 km^{2} (50 sq mi). The southern part of this range was already known to have been Minoan. The major site, Roussolakkos, an early version of Palaikastro, was studied by members of the British School at Athens. The French School therefore concentrated on the region from Vai Beach north to (but not including) the military reservation on Cape Sidero, an area of about 20 km^{2} (7.7 sq mi), or 15% of Hellenistic Itanos’ territory, with the expectation that, based on the 1950 excavation, they would find “a Greek countryside.” The final results of the survey have now been released.

The survey was conducted by the two main institutional collaborators from 1994 to 2005 inclusive (12 years). The work was actually performed by an équipe ("team") of UMR 7041 of the CNRS, the French national research institute, which undertook a number of archaeological projects. The persons responsible (French for "in charge") were Alain Schnapp and Alain Duplouy. (Note: "Prospection archéologique à Itanos (Crète orientale)". ARSCAN. 2016. As might be expected of collaborative research, the participants belonged to multiple organizations. There were 3 Participants de l'UMR and 9 "Associates," many of whom later became the authors of some of the works cited in this article. They came from academic institutions located in Paris, Brussels, Crete and Rome. The Italian School of Archaeology at Athens was also represented.) The final outcome of the survey was a virtual map of the surveyed area stored in what came to be known as The Itanos Archaeological Survey database, which was developed over the period and has been online since 2006 running on the servers of the French School. (Note: There are two interfaces, public and private. The public offers the option of generating maps.Costa et al. 2008, pp. 104–105. The private, of restricted access, gives select academics access to the archaeological notes and such additional props as "sherd charts."Costa et al. 2008, p. 106.) The database stores points (données, "data") on the map. One point is a numbered site containing one or more objects of archaeological interest, such as a wall, or a scatter of sherds. The information for a site includes description, date, etc. The database is searchable on a range of specifiable criteria.

The archaeological survey, 1994–2005, focused on remains discoverable on the surface. Also, a deliberate decision was made to ignore concentrations of sherds if there was no other surface manifestation. To locate sites the team turned to aerial photography, which was simplified by the previous existence of military fly-over photographs dating from 1945, 1966, 1968, and 1992. These were compared to 1:5000 maps in possession of the Institute. To supplement them another fly-over was staged in 2004 to capture oblique views.

Noting that the photographs were indicating a "diversity of soils and landscapes" the team thought it more efficient to divide the surveyable territory into 11 zones, which they named after topographic features, such as hills. (Note: The names do not reflect any communities in the civil division, although their use in the literature seems to imply a community. The name is either the zone or the topographic feature after which it is named.) The zones form a semi-circle around the walled city but do not include a central area comprising Vai Palm Forest and agricultural land west of the ancient city. Excluded from public access to the database are the two quasi-islands, Kyriamadi and Sideros, on the military reservation. Their being surveyed was assigned to the 24th Ephorate (another government agency). Whether or not they were surveyed and what might have been found there has not been released to the public, nor it is mentioned in the publications. (Note: The reservation, a naval base, is denied to the public except by prearrangement.)

Ground teams decided what was to be considered a site, which must have an above-ground feature. It was then assigned a number. A decision was made to have the numbers run consecutively within the whole territory rather than within the zones. (Note: For example, the identification Stephanes [60] means the 60th site in the territory, located in Zone 9 (Stephanes).) Assessments of the date and culture came from laboratory analysis of sherds collected at the site. The ground teams used GPS to obtain coordinates for a site. (Note: In that system, a portable ground receiver communicates to a satellite system, which finds its position on an ellipsoidal model of the Earth, and calculates the longitude, latitude, and elevation) Greece, however, uses the EGSA87, which gives different coordinates based on Greek reference points. (Note: EGAS87 is maintained by the Hellenic Military Geographical Service, a branch of the military. The system was developed to be more suitable to Greek terrain.) According to the policy of the 24th Ephorate GPS coordinates are converted to EGSA87 coordinates, which are the ones appearing on maps of the survey, when they do. The collaborative institutions, however, decided to restrict access to the coordinates as a measure to protect the sites.

The survey team began with the expectation that they would find a "countryside" supportive of the Greek city of Itanos, and it was to some degree present. They also found cultures going as far back as the Neolithic, much before the city and the Greeks, which the Greeks had supplanted. (Note: "Especially remarkable ... are the remains of ancient infrastructure: several sq. km of terraces, check dams, enclosure walls, roads and quarries. In antiquity nearly the whole of the peninsula, even what are now areas of bare rock, was used.") In the words of Moody and Rackham, the peninsula "is the large scale survival of a relict cultural landscape — details of Neolithic, Bronze Age (Minoan), Archaic, Classical, Hellenistic, Roman, and Byzantine Cretan lives ...." This landscape was owned by Toplou Monastery and was threatened for a time by plans made by it with a real estate company to develop parts of it in exchange for a percentage, but in 2000 the peninsula was made a Natura 2000 reservation and in 2015 Sitia Geopark. The plans were off.

A period summary of the sites found follows. Usually sequence of pottery type is the main criterion for distinguishing period, but as no excavation was performed, no exact sequences were established, and the team had to group together whatever period pottery was found together, creating periods of convenience.

Period	Dates	Description
Final Neolithic/Early Minoan I (FN/EM I); Examples: Alatopatela 12, Soros 74, Vamies 14, 15, 17	The FN is 3500-3000 BC (Note: The dates of the FN in Crete vary in the literature and on the Internet. After an initial definition by C. Renfrew in 1972 that was unacceptably over 1000 years, a date of the late 4th millennium proposed by L. Vignetti and P. Bello in 1978 became standard and is used by the team. Nowicki 2002, p. 15. The dates for EM are highly variable and depend on the theorist, but in general it covers the 3rd millennium BC and contains I, II, and III.) The date given for the start of EM is 3100 BC. No date is given for the end of EM I.	FN sherds are in association with walled forts (Note: The forts are typically younger than the pottery but it is assumed the newer walls were built over older ones.) on elevations overlooking the Sea of Crete. These are only a few of 182 FN sites (2012) distributed over E Crete and along the N coast from Cape Sideros to past Sitia, believed to represent "a retreat to defensible locations" by lowland population as "substantial groups of immigrants" arrived. The survey area FN sites go on into EM I, but at its end the whole Itanos Peninsula is abandoned. As EM is known as the "Pre-palatial phase," during which populations collected in the vicinity of the palaces, Duplouy suggests that the communities on Itanos found difficulty "exploiting this peculiar territory" and delayed their "settlement nucleation" until EM II, which would count as the beginning of the Pre-palatial in the survey region.

=== Plan of the city ===
A number of plans and aerial views of the site are available.

Description	Region covered	Author	Source
Contour map showing the location of features excavated to date, all periods.	Site from the North Necropolis to South Hill.	P. Duboeuf, D. Theodorescu	Tsingarida & Viviers 2019, p. 214, Figure 1
Contour map with coordinates, showing the main features, all periods, followed by several black-and-white three-quarter view aerial photographs.	The site from the E-W akropoleis line to South Hill		Tsigonaki 2009, p. 162, Figures 1-6
Contour map showing numbered locations of the surveyed or excavated features.	Site from the North Necropolis to South Hill.	C. Licoppe	Kalpaxis 1995, p. 719, Figure 5
Color terrain map of the Itanos Archaeological Survey (see above) showing numbered dots for the data points. Also shown are two small maps outlining the survey zones and giving the sites per zone and the density of sites per zone. A subsequent figure shows the zones with the points.	The territory of the survey in NE Crete excluding the military base on Cape Sidero. It wraps around the walled city of Itanos from Vai southward north to the cape.	ARSCAN, the survey team.	Costa et al. 2008, pp. 117, 121, Figures 4,6
Overlay on a satellite photo of the promontory of the Natura 2000 Protected Area. Overlay on another satellite photo of the data points of the survey.	A region approximating the maximum territory of the ancient city. The region of the survey.	Natura 2000, Rackham and Moody on a Google Earth satellite photo.	Rackham & Moody 2012, pp. 222, 225, Figs 4.3, 4.8

== Gallery ==
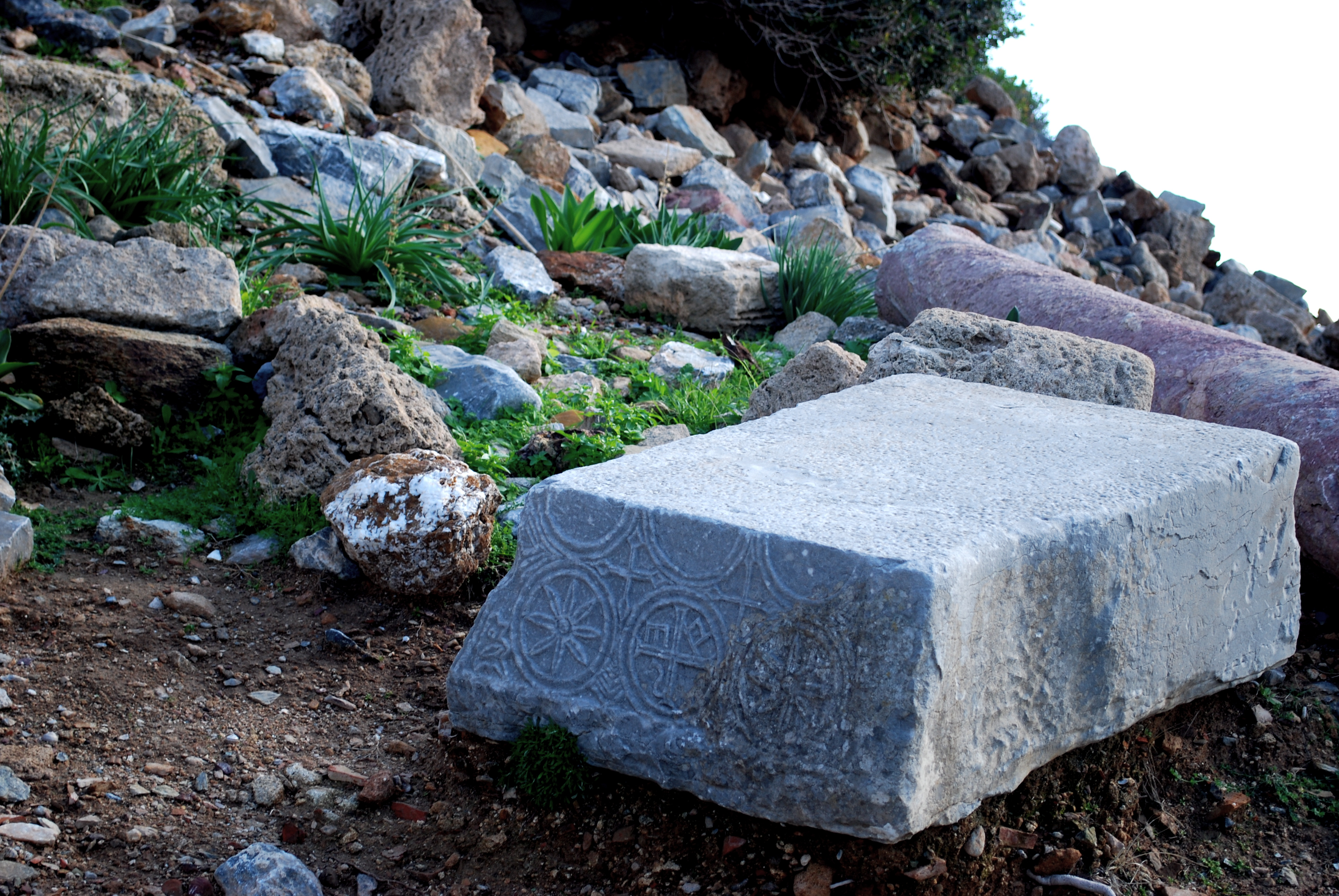
Slab from the East Basilica, or Christian church

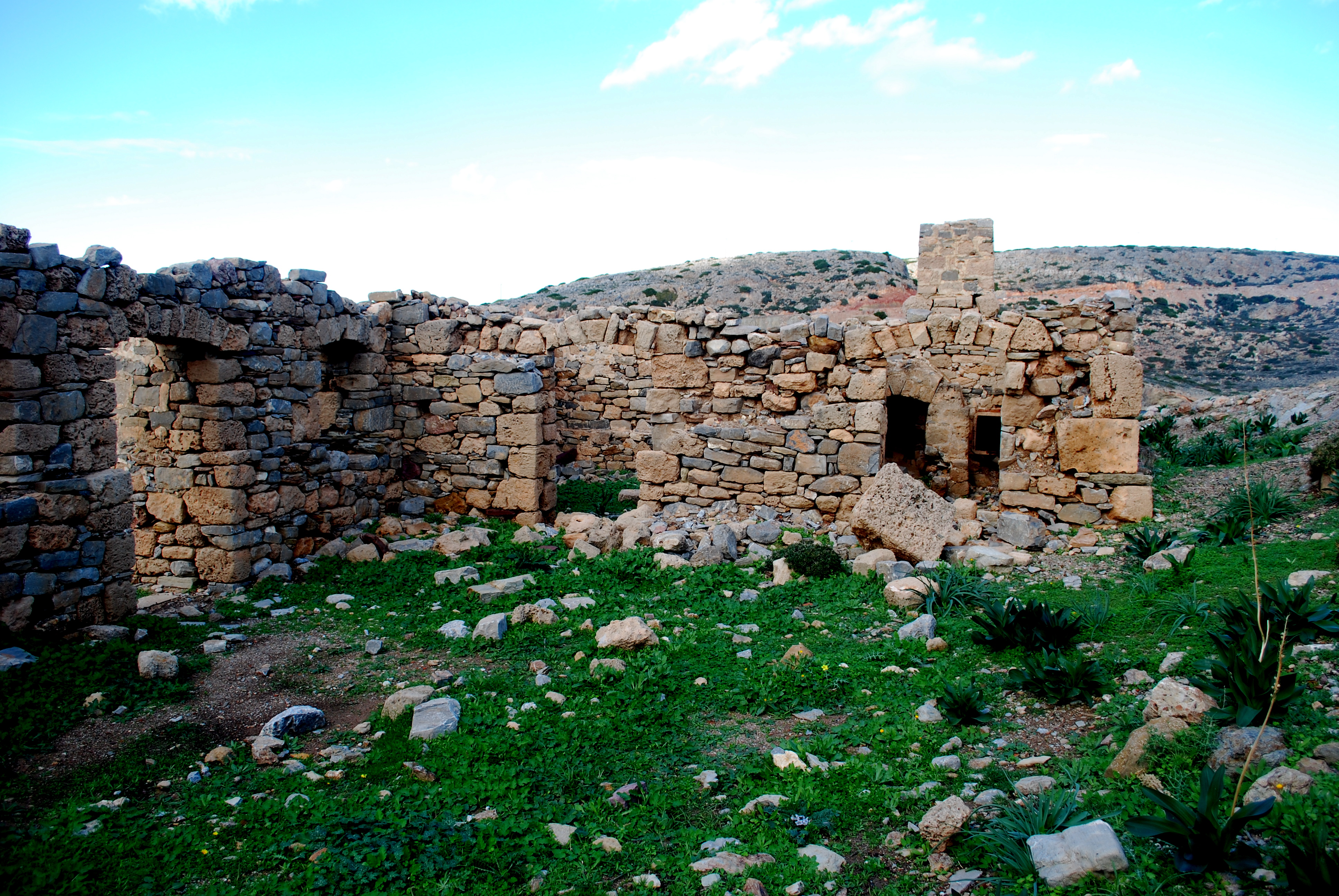
Ruins on East Akropolis

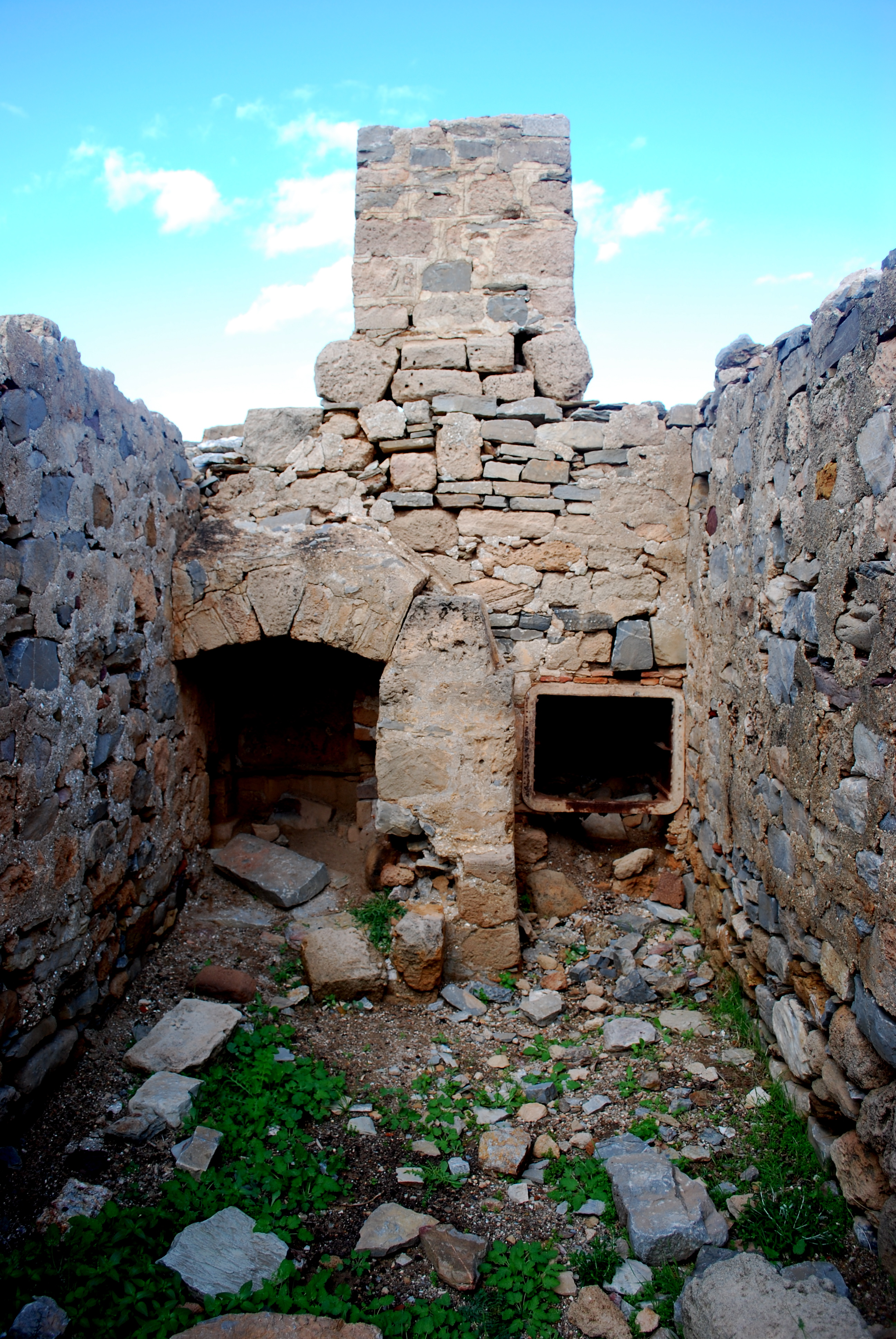
Ruins on East Akropolis

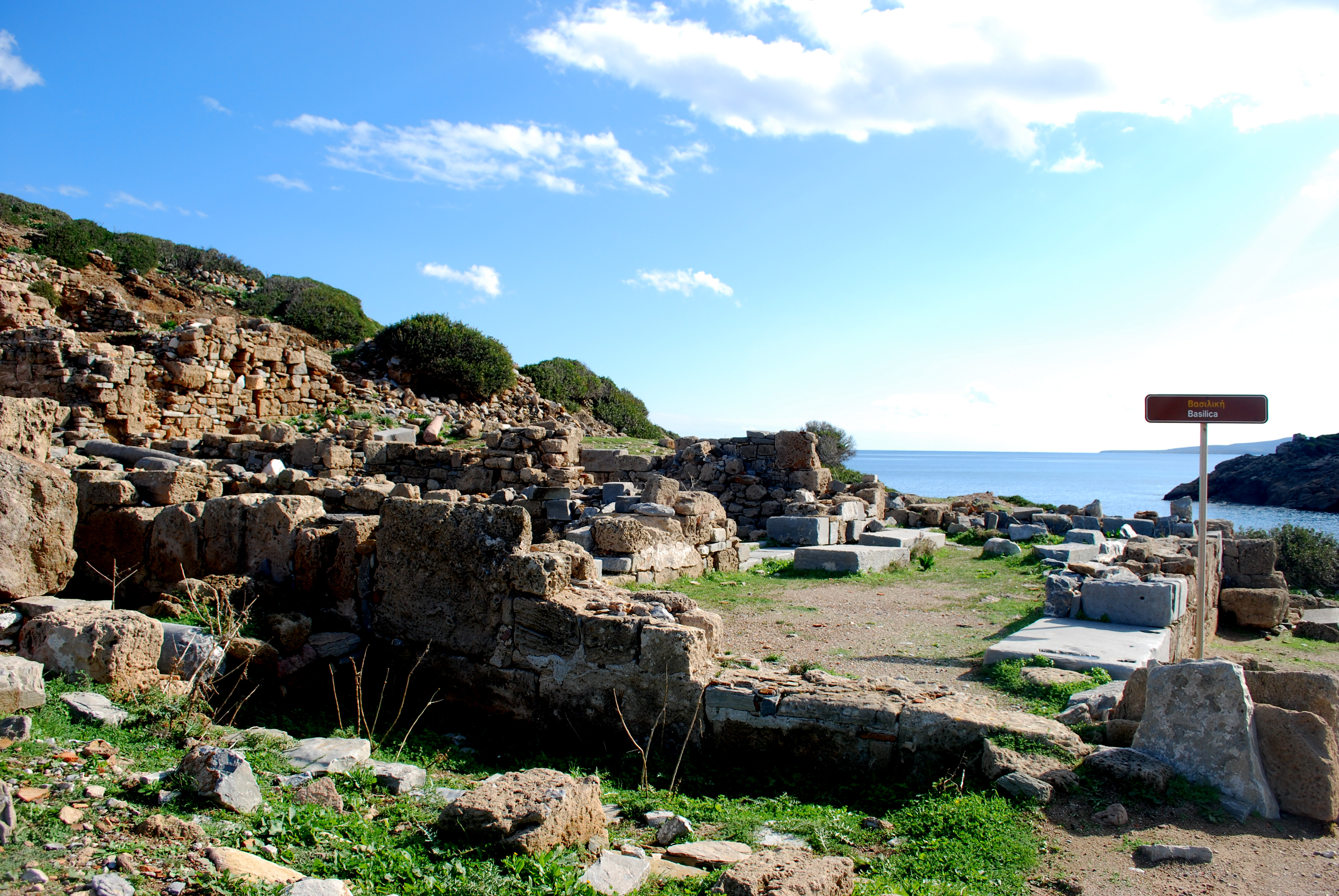
East Basilica

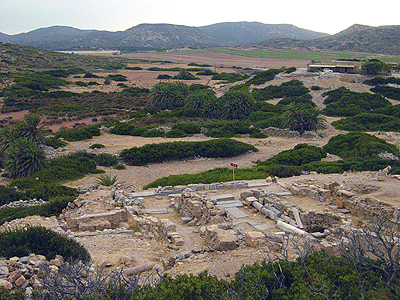
East Basilica from the top of East Akropolis. Harbor area in background.

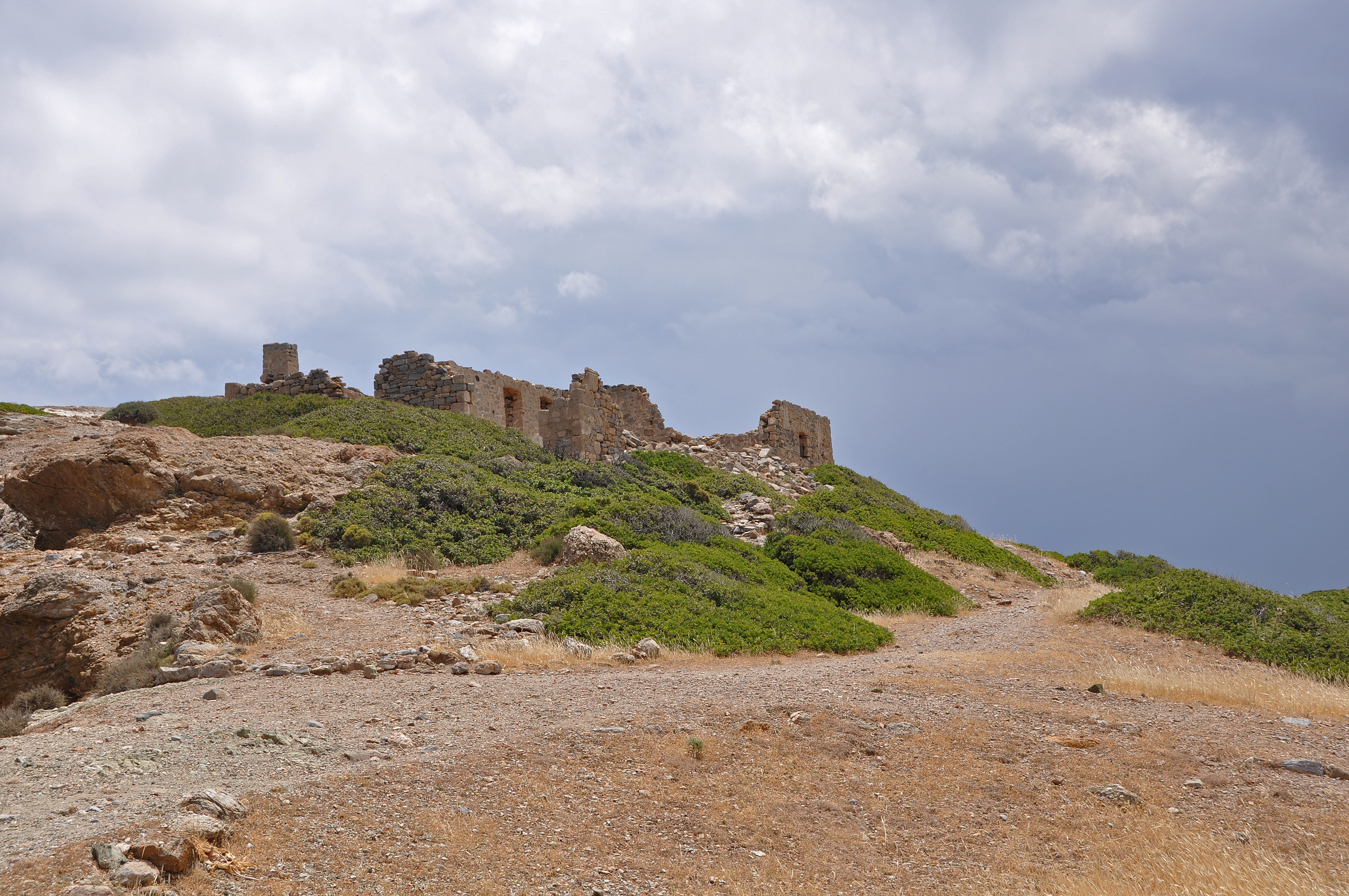
East Akropolis from Itanos Beach, anciently the harbor.

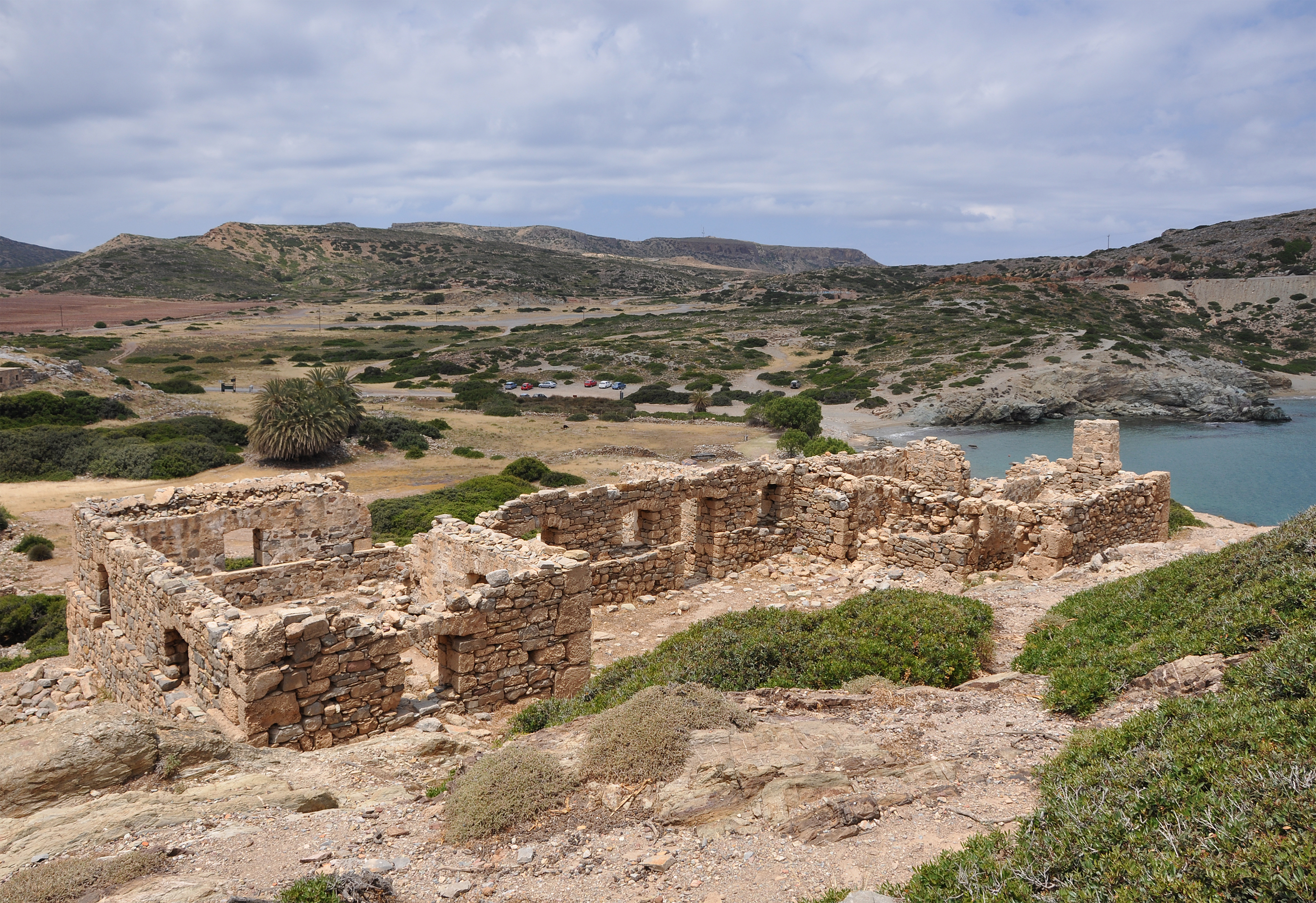
View north from excavated buildings on East Akropolis, overlooking beach and bay of Eremoupolis, with Itanos Promontory in the background

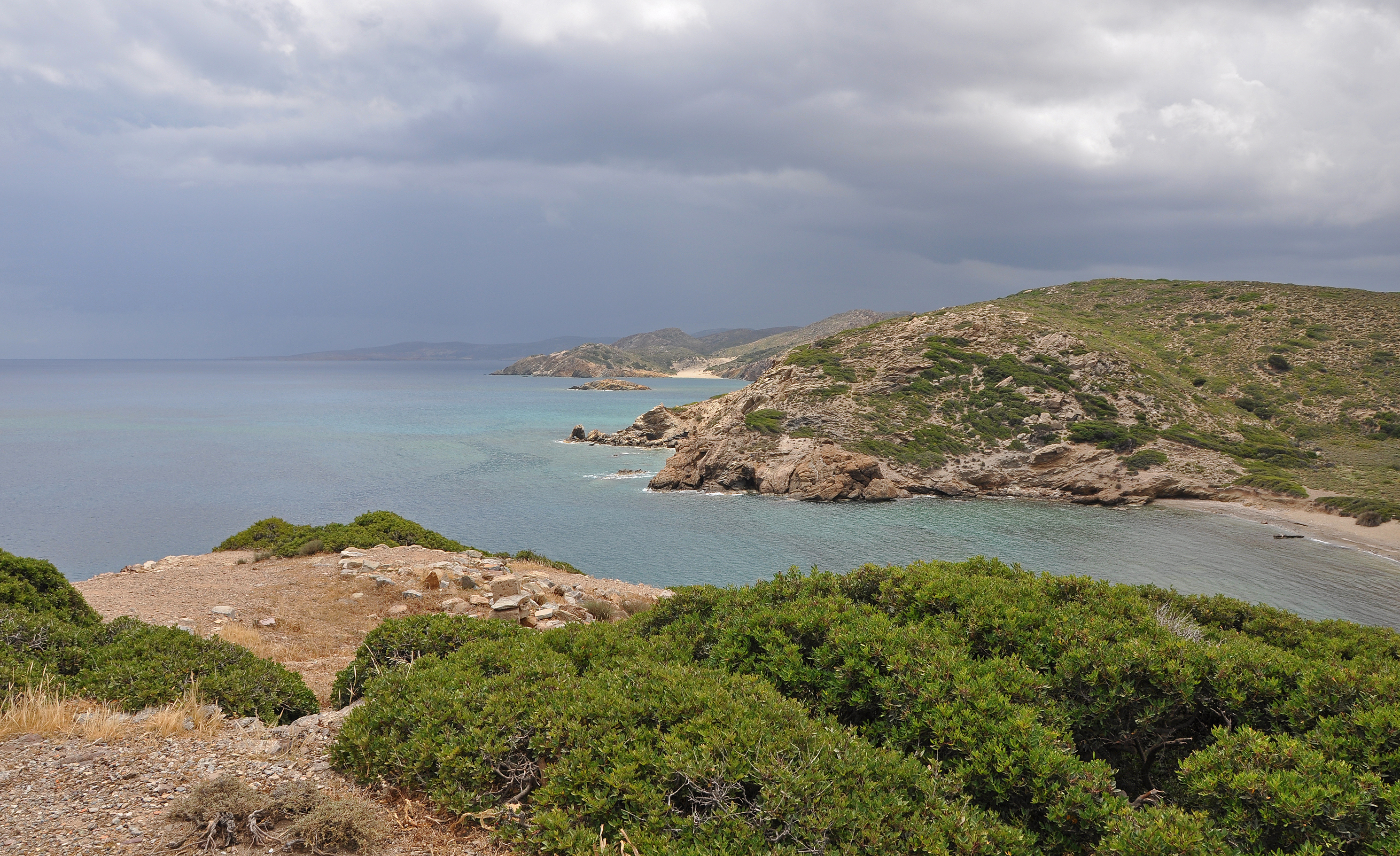
View southward across East Akropolis. Itanos Bay and Beach in the background, Cape Plaka, Skaria Beach and the Grandes Islands further down. Vai Beach not visible.

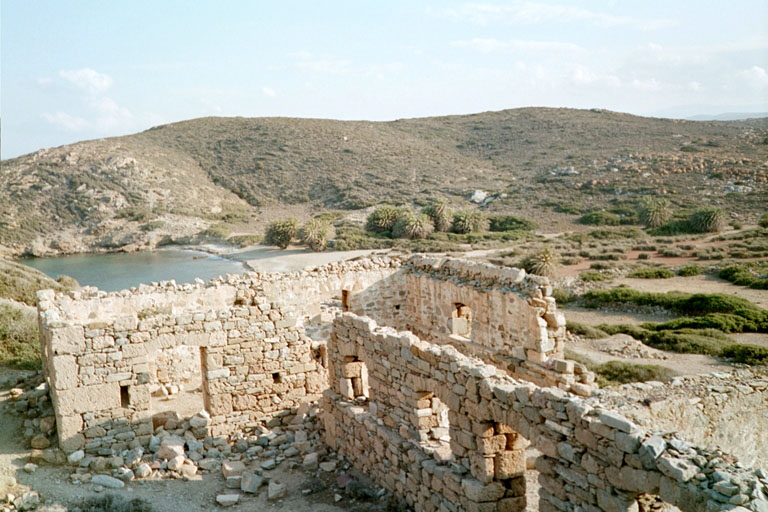
View southward to Itanos Beach from the inner slope of East Akropolis.

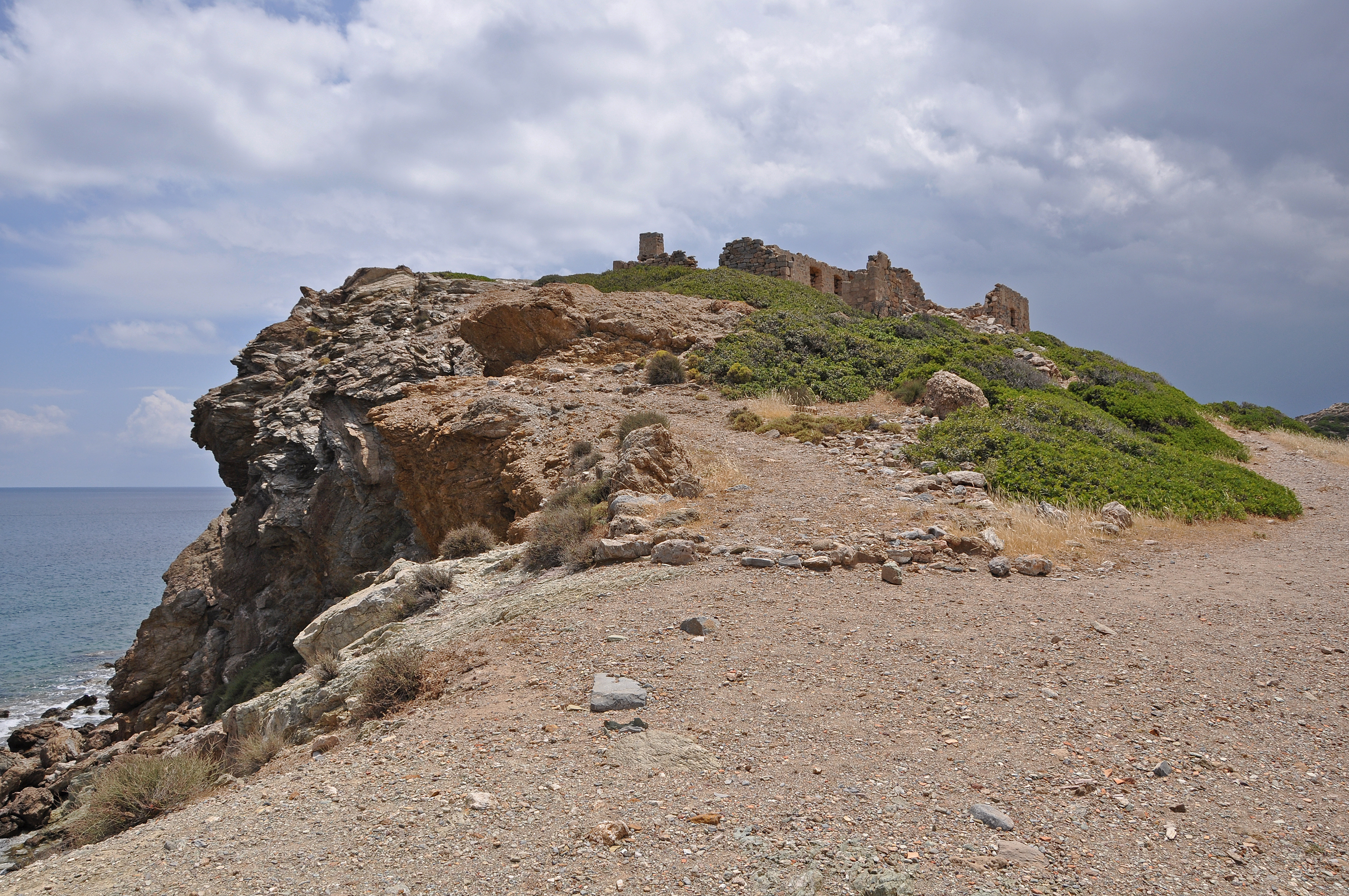
East Akropolis from the north side.

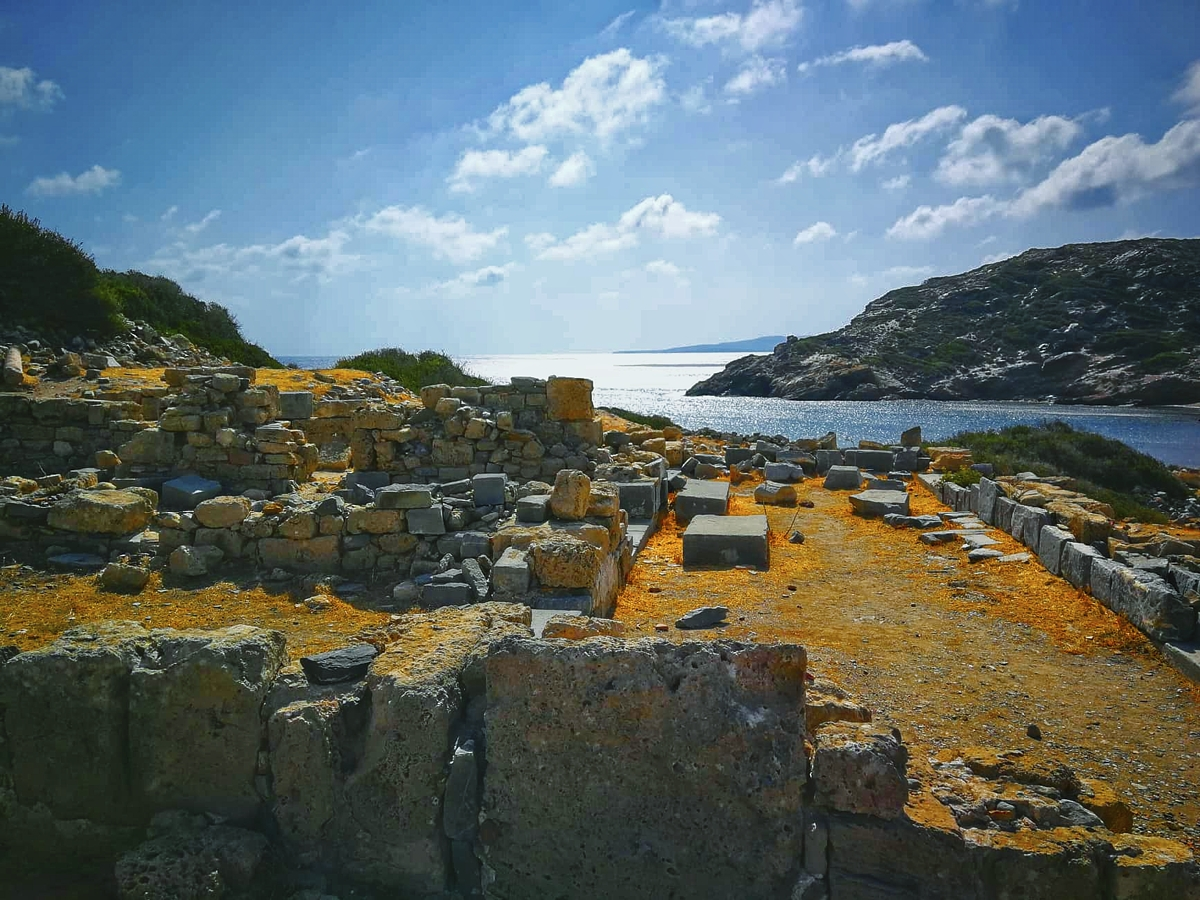
East Basilica overlooking Itanos Bay, Cape Plaka in the far distance.

== Maps ==
British admiralty chart. The latest date on the chart is 1895. The soundings were collected by HMS Spitfire in 1852. Soundings are in fathoms. Elevations are in feet.

== Reference bibliography ==
- Bennet, John (2011). "13. The Geography of the Mycenaean Kingdoms" (PDF). A companion to Linear B: Mycenaean Greek Texts and Their World. Vol. 2. Louvain-la-neuve; Walpole, MA: Peeters.
- Bourogiannis, Giorgos (2018). "The Phoenician Presence In The Aegean During The Early Iron Age: Trade, Settlement And Cultural Interaction". Revista di Studi Fenice. XLVI.
- Duplouy, Alain; et al. (2018). "The Itanos Archaeological Survey". Activities: 11th International Cretological Conference. A2.1.
- Duplouy, Alain; et al. (2019). "Le territoire d'Itanos au Ier millénaire av. J.-C. De la naissance de la cité grecque à la conquête romaine. Méthode et résultats de la prospection d'Itanos".
- Ercek, Rudy; et al. (2010). "3D reconstruction and digitalization of an archeological site, Itanos, Crete". Virtual Archaeology Review. 1 (1): 81. doi:10.4995/var.2010.4794. hdl:10251/139895.
- Greco, Emanuele; et al. (2002). "Travaux menés en collaboration avec l'Ecole française en 2001. Itanos (Crète orientale)". Bulletin de Correspondance Hellénique (in French). CXXVI: 577–582. doi:10.3406/bch.2002.7109.
- Halbherr, Frederico (1891a). "Researches in Crete: I-Itanos". The Antiquary. 24 (11): 201–203.
- Halbherr, Frederico (1891b). "Researches in Crete: I-Itanos (concluded)". The Antiquary. 24 (12): 241–245.
- Kalpaxis, T.; et al. (1995). "Travaux menés en collaboration avec l'Ecole française en 1994: Itanos (Crète orientale)". Bulletin de Correspondance Hellénique. CXIX: 713–736. doi:10.3406/bch.1995.7008.
- Moody, Jennifer; Rackham, Oliver (2016). Comments on the proposed Itanos Gaia (Cavo Sidero) Development (PDF). ekrit.gr.
- Nowicki, Krzysztof (2002). "The End of the Neolithic in Crete". Aegean Archaeology. 6.
- Nowicki, Krzysztof (2012). "Final Neolithic Crete and the Southeast Aegean: Supplement 1". Aegean Archaeology. 11: 7–34.
- Rackham, Oliver; Moody, Jennifer (2012). "4.3 Drivers of Change and the Landscape History of Cavo Sidero". In Papayannis, Thymio; Howard, Peter (eds.). Reclaiming the Greek Landscape (PDF). Athens: Mediterranean Institute for Nature and Anthropos (Med-INA).
- Costa, Laurent; Eyraud, Franck; Duplouy, Alain; Sarris, Apostolos (2008). "Vers la mise en réseau des données et des chercheurs: le système d'information de la prospection d'Itanos (Crète oriental)" (PDF). Archeologia e Calcolatori (in French). 19: 103–122.
- Spratt, T.A.B.; et al. (1865). Travels and Researches in Crete. Vol. 1. London: John Van Voorst.
- Tsigonaki, Christina (2009). "Ίτανος: ιστορία και τοπογραφία μιας παράκτιας θέσης της ανατολικής Κρήτης κατά την πρωτοβυζαντινή περίοδο" (PDF). In Gratziou, O.; Loukos, Ch. (eds.). Ψηφίδες, Μελέτες Ιστορίας, Αρχαιολογίας και Τέχνης στη μνήμη της Στέλλας Παπαδάκη (in Greek). Irakleio: Crete University Press.
- Tsingarida, Athena; Viviers, Didier (2019). "No more Gap, but New Social Practices: Evidence of Collective Funerary Rituals in Itanos during the 6th and 5th Centuries BC". In Lemos, Irene S.; Tsingarida, Athena (eds.). Beyond the Polis: Rituals, Rites And Cults in Early and Archaic Greece (12th-6th Centuries BC). Bruxelles: CReA-Patrimoine.
- Vafidis, Antonis; et al. (2005). "Integrated geophysical studies at ancient Itanos (Greece)". Journal of Archaeological Science. 32 (7): 1023–1036. doi:10.1016/j.jas.2005.02.007.
- Ventris, Michael; Chadwick, John (1953). "Evidence for Greek Dialect in the Mycenaean Archives". Journal of Hellenic Studies. LXXIII: 84–130. doi:10.2307/628239. JSTOR 628239. S2CID 163873642.
