= Daphnus (Ionia) =

Daphnus or Daphnous (Ancient Greek: Δαφνοῦς) was a town of ancient Ionia. After the losses of the Athenians in Sicily, Clazomenae revolted with Chios and Erythrae against their Athenian overlords. The Clazomenii at the same time began to fortify Polichne on the mainland as a place of refuge, if it should be necessary. The Athenians took Polichne, and removed the people back to Clazomenae, except those who had been most active in the revolt; and they went off to Daphnus. Pliny the Elder states that it was no longer existing in his time.

Its site is unlocated.
