= Dorium =

Town of ancient Messenia

Coordinates: 37°15′15″N 21°52′51″E

Dorium or Dorion (Ancient Greek: Δώριον) was a town of ancient Messenia, Dorium appears in the Catalogue of Ships in Homer's Iliad, where he mentions it as the place where the bard Thamyris was smitten with blindness, because he boasted that he could surpass the Muses in singing. Strabo says that some persons said Dorium was a mountain, and others a plain; but there was no trace of the place in his time, although some identified it with a place called Oluris (Ὄλουρις) or Olura (Ὄλουρα), in the district of Messenia named Aulon. Pausanias, however, places the ruins of Dorium on the road from Andania to Cyparissia. After leaving Andania, he first came to Polichne; and after crossing the rivers Electra and Coeus, he reached the fountain of Achaia and the ruins of Dorium.

Its site is located near the modern Malthi.
