= Toplou Monastery =

Greek Orthodox monastery in Crete

- Μονή Τοπλού
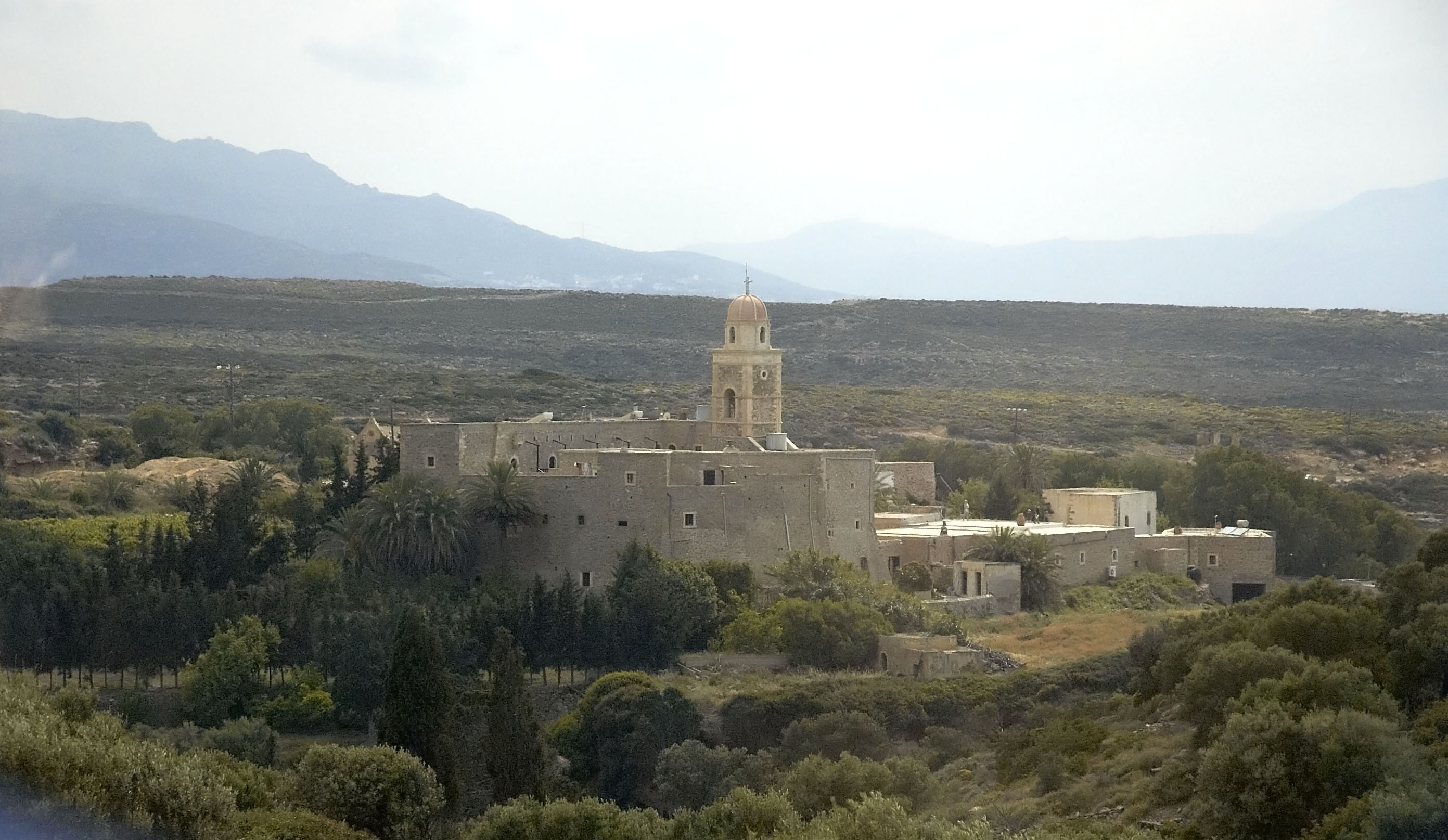
- General view of the monastery

- Location of the monastery in Crete
- Interactive map of Toplou Monastery

Monastery information
- Order: Ecumenical Patriarchate of Constantinople
- Denomination: Greek Orthodox
- Dedication: Virgin Mary; St. John the Theologian
- Archdiocese: Church of Crete

Architecture
- Status: Monastery
- Functional status: Active
- Style: Byzantine
- Completion date: c. 1350

Site
- Location: Siteia, Palekastro, Lasithi, Crete
- Country: Greece
- Coordinates: 35°13′17″N 26°12′58″E
- Public access: Yes

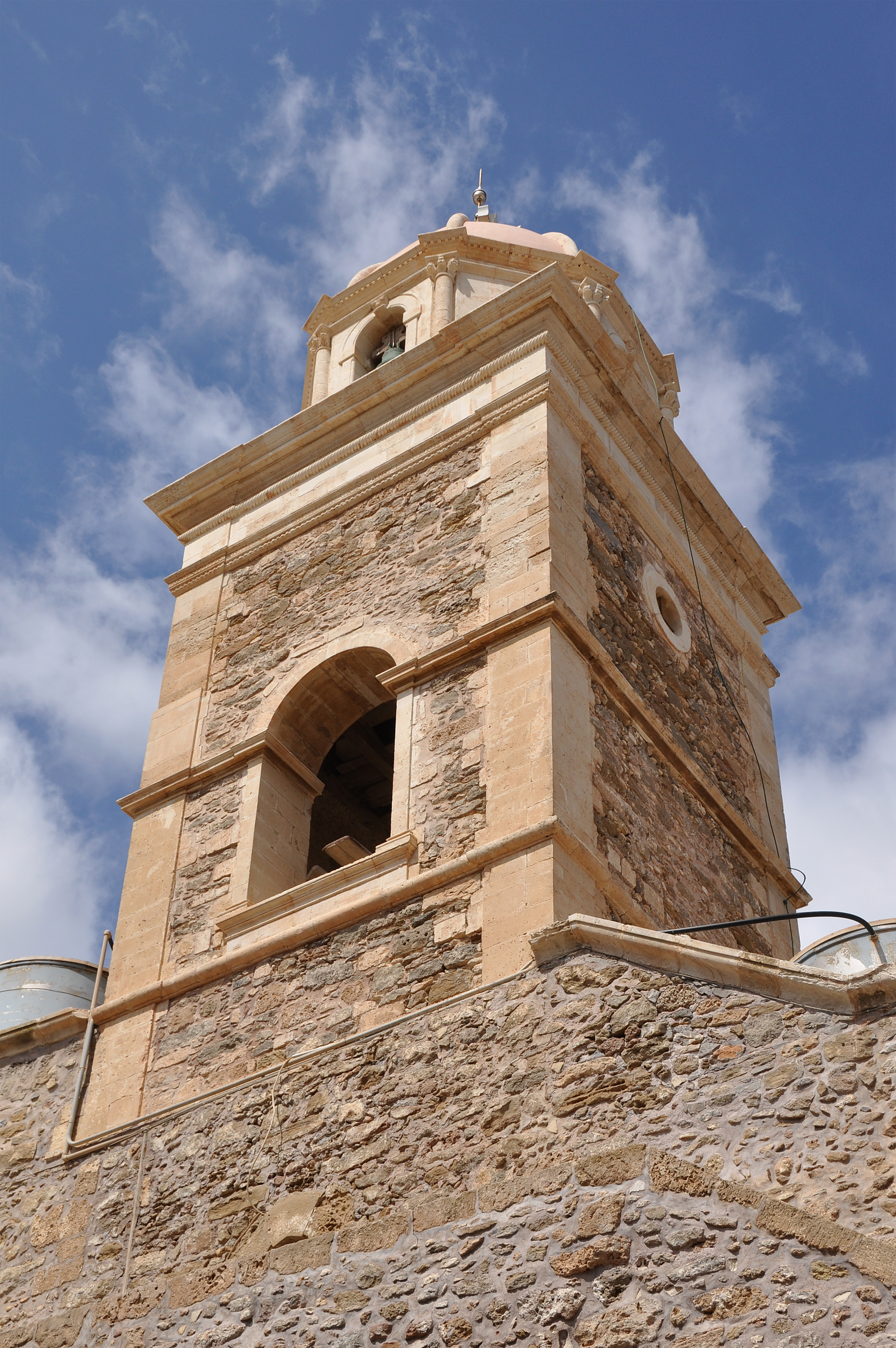
The bell-tower

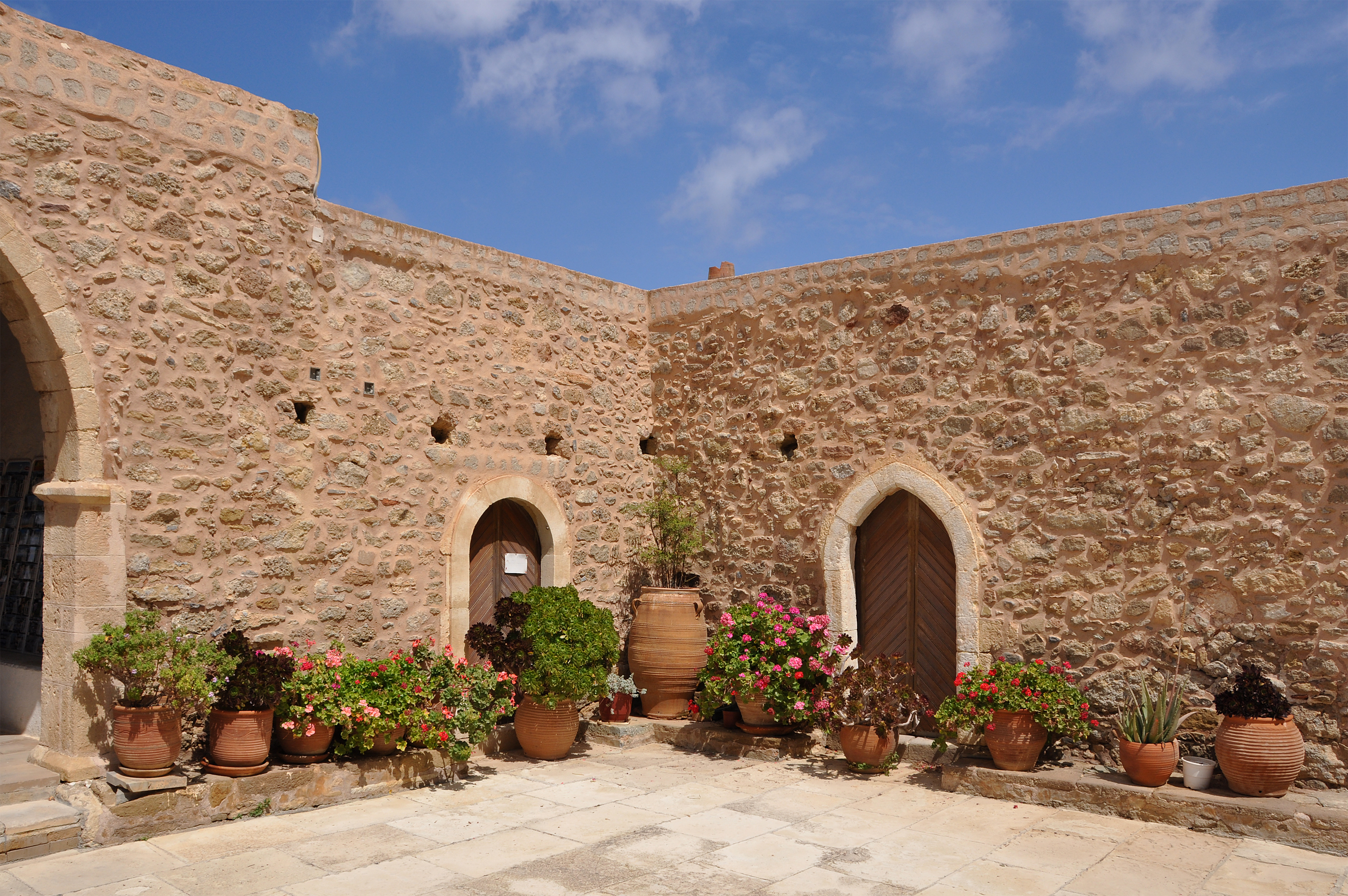
One of the outer courts

The Toplou Monastery (Greek: Μονή Τοπλού, romanized: Moni Toplou, lit. 'Monastery of the Place of the Cannon') is a Greek Orthodox monastery located in a semi-arid area of the Lasithi region, on the eastern part of the island of Crete, Greece. Situated approximately 6 kilometres (3.7 mi) north of Palekastro and 85 km (53 mi) east of Agios Nikolaos, it is at the base of the Itanos promontory from which Cape Sidero, the easternmost point of Crete, projects to the northeast. The nearest settlements are Sitia to the west and Palaikastro to the southeast; otherwise, the entire promontory is uninhabited except for the modern military reservation at the tip of the cape.

Believed to have been founded in the 14th century, the monastery was placed on the upper southern slope of Moni Toplou Gorge (named after it), a tortuous, geologically and ecologically interesting ravine exiting into the Sea of Crete through a boulder-strewn declivity called "the Abbott's Beach" (he paralia tou hegoumenou). (Note: A secret passage led from the monastery through a cave into the ravine providing hidden access and escape. The German discovery of its use as a radio station by the resistance in World War II led to dire consequences for the monks.) Today the ravine is one of the reasons why the whole area has been incorporated into Sitia Geopark. The original placement was made near a copious spring draining into the gorge, now the site of a windmill-driven pump raising water out of the water table below.

The monastery was founded at a time when the classical city of Itanus, former owners of the promontory, was long gone, abandoned centuries earlier, and forgotten by all except the monks, who continued to be interested in the site. The Ottoman Empire had not yet become ascendant. For reasons unknown or not generally published the monastery inherited the entire territory of the ancient city, which it holds today as a major asset. (Note: A study of the monastery's land acquisition remains to be done. Meanwhile the main speculations are that the acquisitions date to the 15th century when under the Venetian policy of building up the monastery as a defensive bastion against the Turks it was allowed to acquire smaller monasteries in the vicinity. In another speculation land-holders under Turkish rule, which was given into the hands of the corrupt janissaries, deeded the land to the monastery to avoid paying taxes to the janissaries. There is no doubt that the monastery received many bequests, but an evidential account waits for the study.) A corporation has been created for its land holdings, "The Public Welfare Foundation of Panagia Akrotiriani," a subsidiary of the monastery and the Archdiocese of Sitia. The monastery was originally called Panagia Akrotiriani ("Our lady of the Cape)," a name which apparently is still legally meaningful. Its alternative current name, Moni Toplou, literally means "place of the cannon" (Turkish: top), thus called by the Turks for the cannon then mounted over the door. It had that name since at least 1865, when Thomas Abel Brimage Spratt reported on his survey work in Crete, misrepresenting the name as Greek to plou ("the plou," whatever "plou" might be).

The monastery has this entire time been economically and politically proactive. The monks, dressed in blue robes, under the direction of the Abbott, run a number of businesses. As the main road from Sitia to Vai runs through the premises, the monastery is open to the public for an entrance fee. Temporary hotel space is also available. Within the main gate are a store and a museum. The museum is a repository for many works of art, containing also collections of manuscripts. On the outside, much of the land around the monastery buildings is used for viticulture and dendriculture. They manufacture and export wine and olive oil. The real estate company is currently negotiating other uses of the promontory, but the chief obstacle is the conservation-minded government. Similarly, the cape is theirs but its use is reserved to the military. Some high points of their political proactivity are their support of resistance to the Ottoman Empire and to the Nazi occupation of Crete.

== History ==
=== Evidence of the early monastery ===
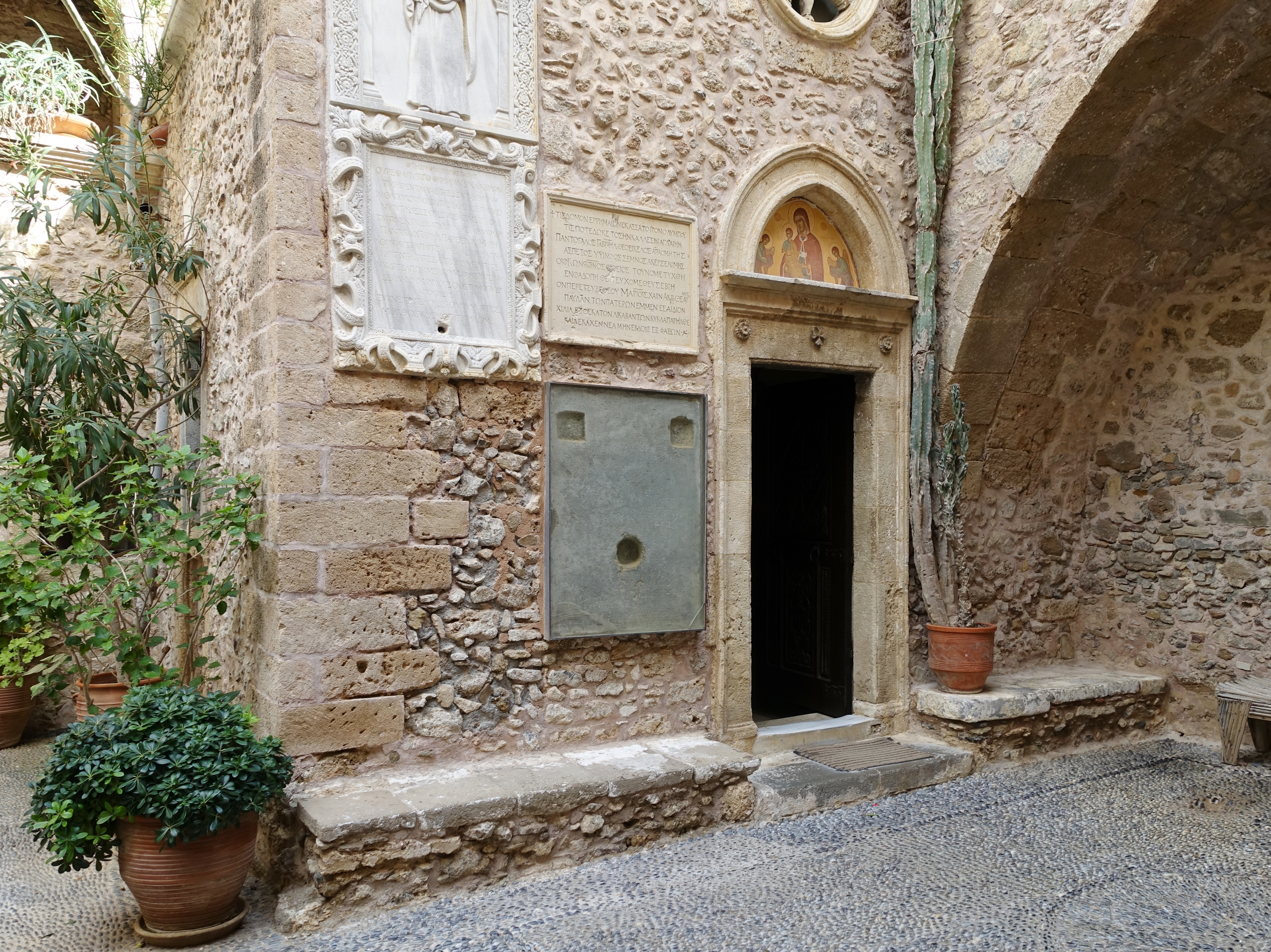
Original church

The monastery is dedicated to Panagia (Virgin Mary) and St. John the Theologian. The monastery, especially the main building, is a composite of structures resulting from its frequent destruction and consequent rebuilding. Different parts of it have different dates of origin. These appear in the literature as different "foundation dates." More accurately the original foundation date remains unknown, while the others are only rebuilding dates.

The oldest identifiable structure is the northern nave of the church in the inner courtyard, which has two. The northern once stood alone before any fortifications had been built. It is and perhaps originally was dedicated to the Virgin Mary, Our Lady of the Cape. The frescoes on its walls are as early as the 14th century. This is the only solid evidence of its earliest known date. The evidence dates to a century well within the period of Venetian sovereignty over Crete. The Venetians, however, were of the Roman brand of Christianity, whereas the monks were Greek Orthodox. Not enough is known to extend the date into times when the Orthodox were ascendant.

=== The corsair problem ===
After the fall of Constantinople on May 20, 1453, and consequent end of the Byzantine Empire, Cretan defenders of the city returned to Venetian Candia along with "a stream of refugees." As the Ottoman Empire proceeded to establish itself in the Aegean Sea, Crete, "the last Latin principality," became "no longer safe." Turkish privateers, having taken the Cyclades, ravaged its coasts, plundering to support the Turkish war treasury, destroying settlements, and capturing population for sale as slaves. Sitia was attacked in 1471. Muslim corsairs found their way in 1498 to the undefended Toplou Monastery and sacked it.

Suleiman the Magnificent had employed the pirate, Hayreddin Barbarossa, giving him 200 galleys, to capture the Greek islands. He turned to the north coast of Crete in 1538, burning crops, confiscating farm animals, and taking slaves. By this time Barbarossa was operating from the new Barbary State founded in Algiers. These pirates raided as far away as the coast of England, capturing on one occasion Reverend Devereux Spratt, ancestor of Thomas Abel Brimage Spratt, later explorer of Crete and friend to the monastery. The reverend though ransomed stayed on in Algiers as minister to the Christian slaves until expelled.

=== The earthquake of 1612 ===
The monastery collapsed in 1612 due to a strong earthquake. Centered near Heraklion, the quake, of magnitude 7.2 (Richter), affected mainly northern Crete, bringing down buildings and sinking ships in the harbor due to the tsunami. The collapse provided an opportunity to the Venetians to fortify the monastery against the growing corsair problem. On November 5, 1612, Nicolo Balbi, mayor of Sitia and ex-rector of the monastery, wrote to the senate of the Republic of Venice stating that the fortifications of the monastery had been so reduced that it could not be defended against raids.

The Senate decided to financially aid in rebuilding it. A decree of March 13, 1613, allocated 200 ducats, presumably Venetian standard, presumably gold, presumably representing a lot of money, to the abbott, "Gabriele Pantogalo" for the rebuilding of the monastery. Venice was Roman Catholic; the monastery, Greek Orthodox. In Crete there had been some contention earlier. The decree said nothing strategic at all, but that topic was alraady covered by the petitioner. Instead the Senate appended the comment "it having appeared that the church is well attended by many subjects of our kingdom."

If "our kingdom" is Venice, the comment appears to identify the reason for the Senate's generosity. The Balbi family, ascendant at Venice and also at Genoa (connection unknown) claimed descent from a gens of the same name in ancient Rome, as did the Cornaro family of Venice (from Cornelii). Apparently there were equal numbers of Catholic and Greek Orthodox monasteries. When the noble Andrea Cornaro made out his will in 1611 he bequested large numbers of both. Apparently in this period, which some historians would call "the Cretan Renaissance," the two brands of Christianity had overcome their antagonism.

=== Relations with the Ottomans ===
The monastery flourished until the surrender of eastern Crete to the Turks in 1646, after which it was abandoned for a long time. In 1704, it acquired special protection privileges from the Patriarch (i.e., stauropegic) and was re-inhabited. After its monks were slaughtered by Turks in 1821 during the Greek Revolution of Independence, Toplou was again deserted until 1828. In 1866, during the massive Cretan revolt against the Turks, it was once again devastated.

=== Axis occupation ===
During the German occupation of 1941–44, Toplou was providing shelter to resistance fighters and housed their wireless radio. When this was discovered by the Germans, the abbot and two monks were tortured and executed.

== Architecture ==
Having to defend itself from pirates and invaders, the Toplou Monastery is heavily fortified, being laid out around a courtyard paved with sea pebbles and surrounded by strong, 10-metre-high (33 ft) square walls. In its present form it extends to approximately 800 square metres (8,600 sq ft) in three floors, divided into cells, guest houses, kitchens and warehouses. The main church (katholikon) is built as a two-nave basilica and the bell-tower dates from 1558.

== Art and literature at the monastery ==
Despite its turbulent history, Toplou has many works of art to its possession. Today, it hosts an interesting exhibition of Byzantine icons, books and documents, a display of ancient engravings and a collection of artefacts which reflect its role in the historical events that influenced Crete during the last centuries. The monastery possesses a series of about 20 portraits of monks, despotes and igoumens painted by the famous portraitist Thomas Papadoperakis. Many of them have written the recent tragical history of the place. The walls of the monks' dining hall, the "trapezaria", are also adorned with remarkable fresco paintings by the icon painter Manolis Betinakis.

== The Cavo Sidero dispute ==
UK-based Minoan Group (formerly Loyalward Group Plc) plans a €1.2 billion construction project on the 25.9-square-kilometre (10.0 sq mi) Cavo Sidero peninsula that is located in the northeastern part of Crete. This land is owned by the Toplou Monastery and is leased for 80 years. Backed by strong political support, the so-called Cavo Sidero project is advertised as one of the largest tourist investments in Greece. It includes the construction of six tourist villages with 7,000 beds, three golf courses, a conference center, a marina plus sport facilities. However, the Cavo Sidero peninsula is a Natura 2000 designated area of particular biodiversity and archaeological importance and home to the Vai natural palm forest, the largest of its kind in Europe. On top of that, it is one of the driest areas on Crete and the large amounts of water that would be required by the developments when in operation will have a tremendous negative impact on the environment. Despite the investors' assurances that the project was designed to operate according to the principles of sustainable development, there was strong opposition against it by the local population and several environmental groups, including World Wide Fund for Nature. Serious doubts about the intentions and the financial strength of the investors have also been raised.

In April 2009, the Supreme Administrative Court accepted the request of about 300 Sitia residents who sought to annul the ministerial decree of 2007, which adopted the environmental impact study for the project. According to the Court, the environmental licensing of the project was not legitimate since the land use planning foresees only a mild tourist development for the area.

== See also ==
- Church of Crete
- List of Greek Orthodox monasteries in Greece
