= Malthi =

Coordinates: 37°16′0.93″N 21°52′56.81″E

Malthi (Greece)

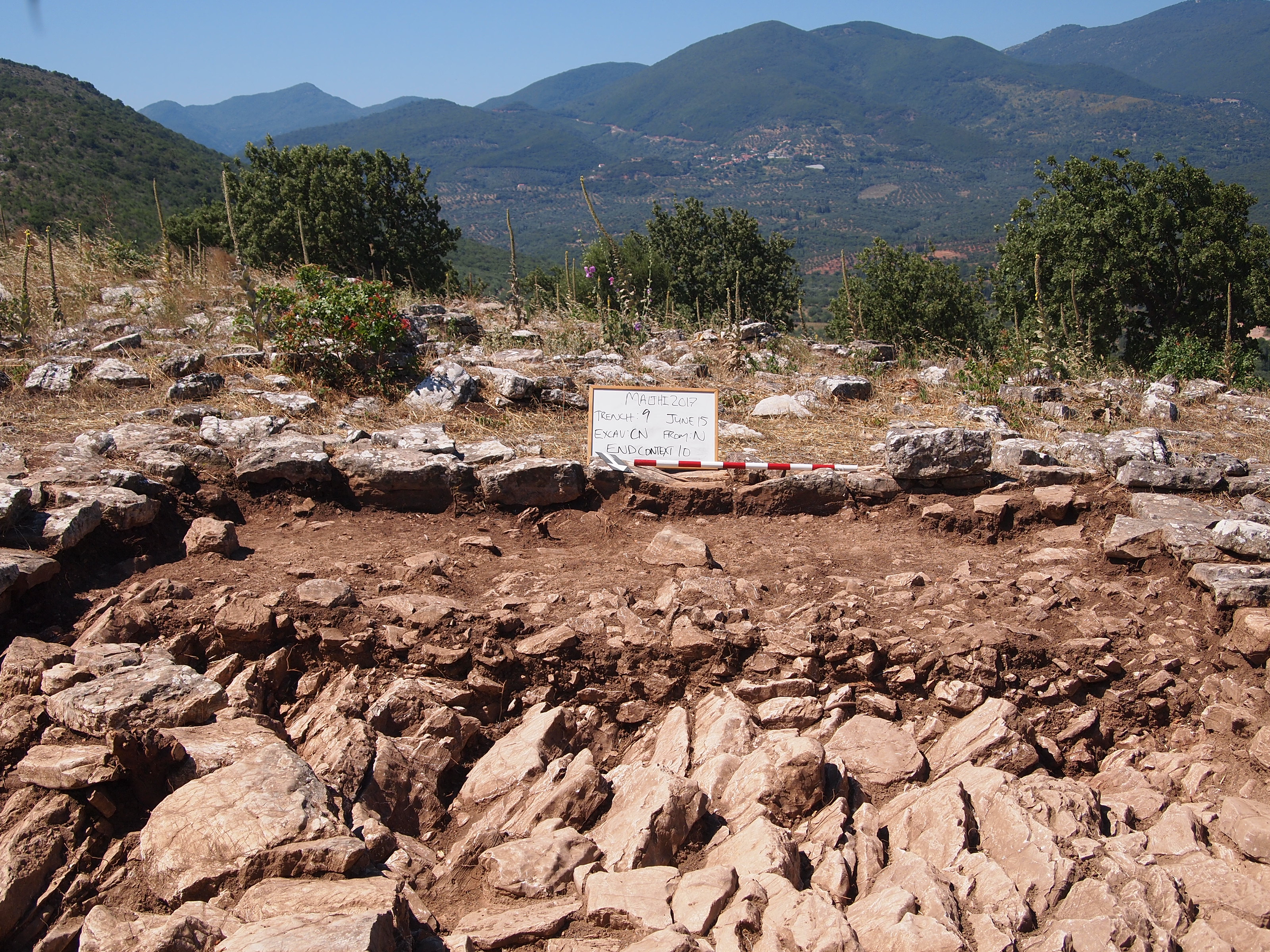
View of Ramovouni mountains from the Malthi ridge

Malthi (/’maalthi:/; Ancient Greek: Μαλθι) was an ancient Greek city of ancient Messenia. Malthi was a farming community, with an active settlement during the Middle-Late Helladic periods, or the Early Mycenaean period. The settlement was located on the top of a ridge on the Northern edge of the Ramovouni mountains, overlooking the Soulima plain in the center of Messenia. It is one of the best preserved fortified settlements of Middle-Late Helladic Greece.

Malthi is a possible location of Dorium, a Homeric site mentioned in the Catalogue of Ships of Homer’s Iliad, where the bard Thamyris was blinded.

In the valley below the ridge are two tholos tombs, excavated by Natan Valmin in the summer of 1927. The settlement on the ridge was first excavated by Natan Valmin between 1926 and 1935, then left untouched until the Malthi Archaeological Project, in collaboration with the Swedish Institute of Athens, cleared natural growth from the site and re-excavated it between 2015 and 2017. This second excavation was conducted by Michael Lindblom and Rebecca Worsham.

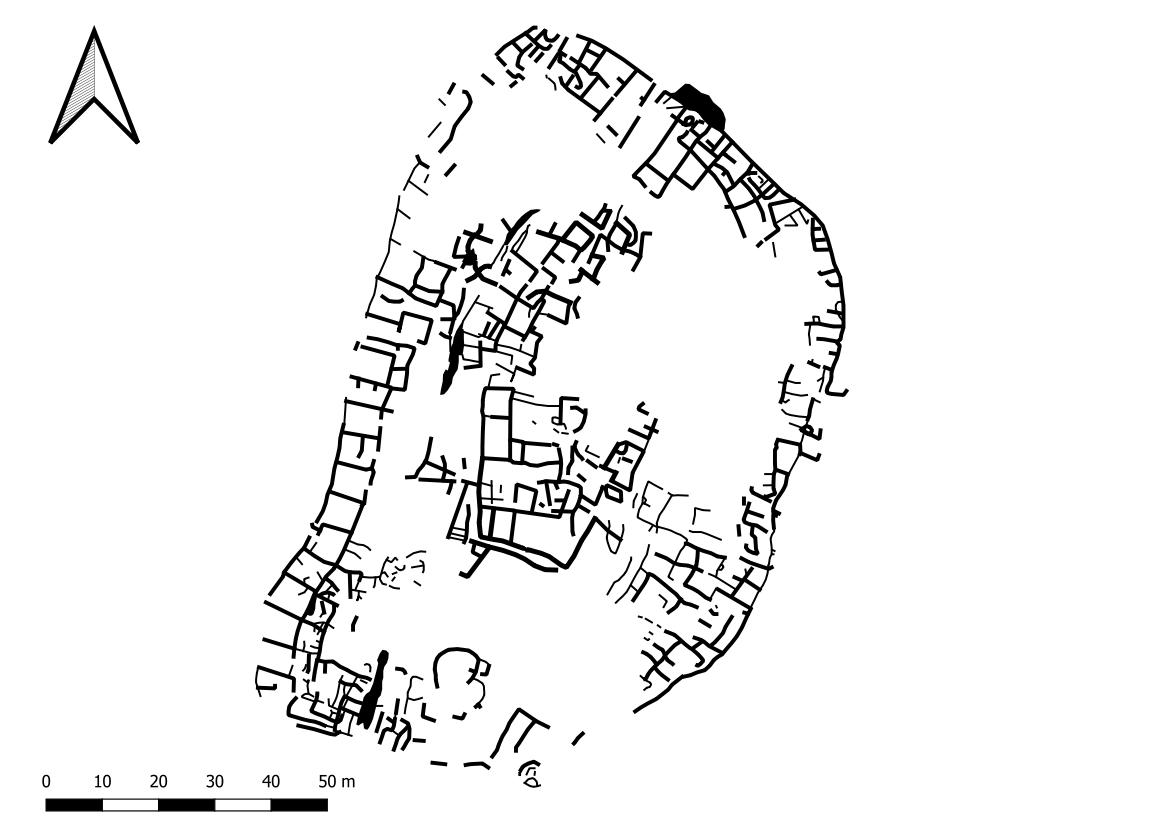
Plan over Malthi - Wikipedia

== See also ==
- Swedish Institute at Athens

== Sources ==
- Swedish Institute at Athens - Malthi, Messenia: https://www.sia.gr/en/articles.php?tid=319&page=1
