= Polichna (Crete) =

Coordinates: 35°11′56″N 26°07′47″E

Polichna (Ancient Greek: Πολίχνα) was a town in the eastern part of ancient Crete, near ancient Praesus.

Its site is tentatively located near the modern Trypitos, Petras.
