= Polichne (Naxos) =

Ancient Town in Greece

Polichne (Ancient Greek: Πολίχνη) was a town of ancient Naxos, mentioned by ancient inscriptions.

Its precise site is unlocated.
