= Polichna (Ionia) =

Town of ancient Ionia

Coordinates: 38°25′45″N 26°34′38″E

Polichna (Ancient Greek: Πολίχνα) was a town of ancient Ionia, near Erythrae.

Its site is tentatively located near the modern Balıklıova.
