= Polichna (Laconia) =

Coordinates: 37°06′48″N 22°54′18″E

Polichna (Ancient Greek: Πολίχνα) was a town of ancient Laconia, mentioned by Polybius.

Its site is located near the modern Poulithra.
