= Polichne (Crete) =

Ancient town in Crete

Coordinates: 35°29′05″N 23°53′38″E

Polichne (Ancient Greek: Πολίχνη), or Polichna (Πολίχνα), was an ancient town in Crete. Its site is tentatively located near the modern Ag. Georgios, Vryses.

Thucydides claims that it fought a war against the neighboring Kydonia in 429 BC, with the support of the Athenians. Herodotus reports a mythic tradition that Polichne and Praisos were the only Cretan cities which did not participate in an expedition against Camicus in Sicily in order to revenge the death of Minos.
