= Polichne (Chios) =

Polichne (Ancient Greek: Πολίχνη) was a town of ancient Chios, mentioned by Herodotus.

Its site is unlocated.
