= Polichne (Messenia) =

Former Messenian town

Coordinates: 37°17′45″N 21°49′25″E

Polichne (Ancient Greek: Πολίχνη) was a town in the northwest of ancient Messenia, situated on the road from Andania to Dorium and Cyparissia.

Its site is tentatively located near the modern Kopanaki/Stylari.
