= Polichne (Ionia) =

Town of ancient Ionia

Coordinates: 38°21′37″N 26°46′07″E

Polichne (Ancient Greek: Πολίχνη), or Polichna (Πολίχνα), was a town of ancient Ionia, near Clazomenae. After the losses of the Athenians in Sicily, Clazomenae revolted with Chios and Erythrae against their Athenian overlords. The Clazomenii at the same time began to fortify Polichne on the main as a place of refuge, if it should be necessary. The Athenians took Polichne, and removed the people back to Clazomenae, except those who had been most active in the revolt; and they went off to a place called Daphnus.

Its site is tentatively located near the modern Urla Iskelesi, İzmir Province, Turkey.
