= Polichna (Megaris) =

Polichna (Ancient Greek: Πολίχνα), or Polichne (Πολίχνη), was a town of ancient Megaris, mentioned by Homer, quoted by Strabo, for which the Athenians substituted another to prove that Salamis at the time of the Trojan War was a dependency of Athens.
