= Polichne (Troad) =

Polichne (Ancient Greek: Πολίχνη), or Polichna (Πολίχνα), was a small town in the upper valley of the Aesepus in the ancient Troad.

Its site is unlocated.
