= Praesus =

Ancient city in Crete

Coordinates: 35°07′28″N 26°05′21″E

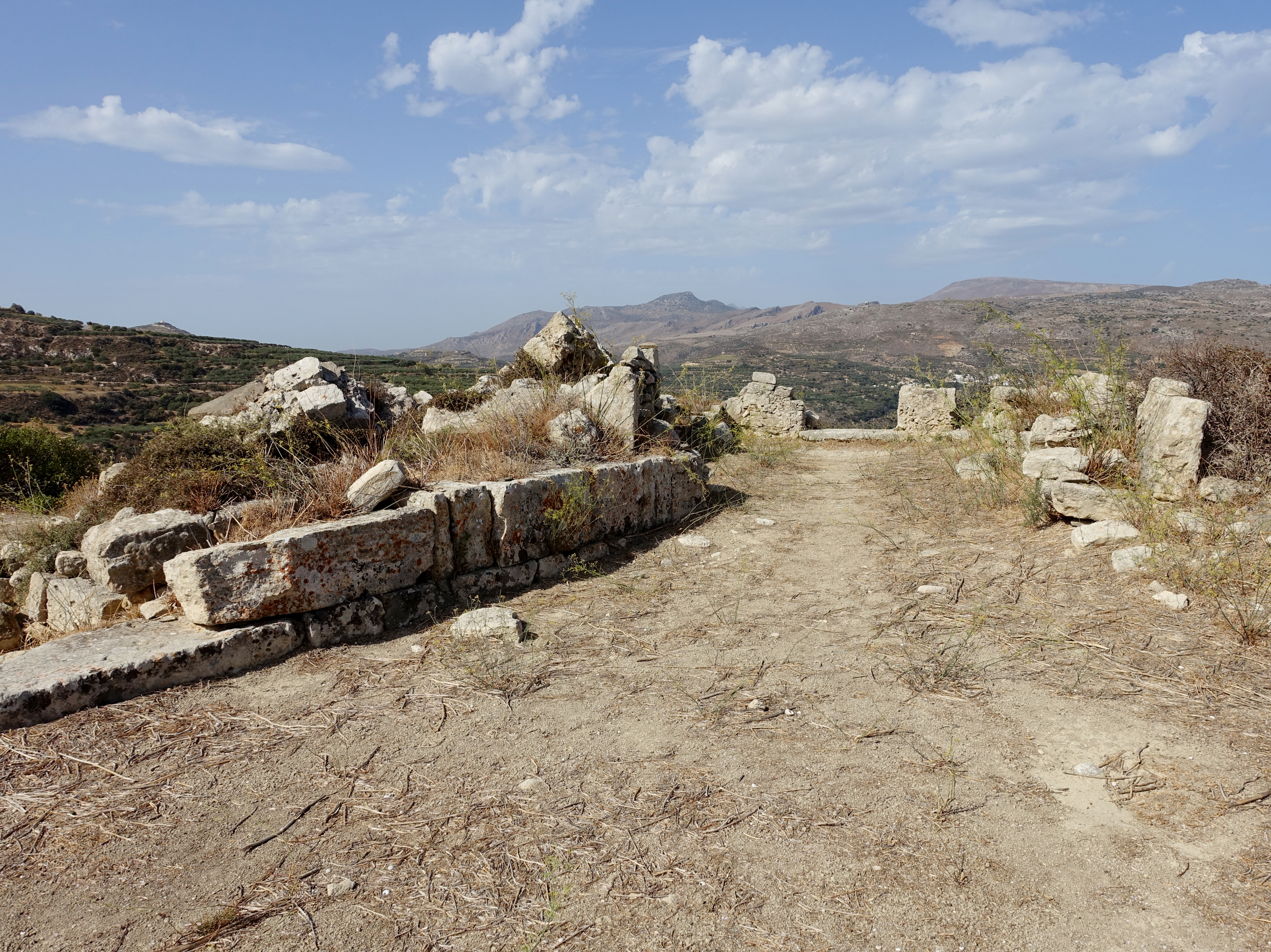
First Acropolis of Praesus

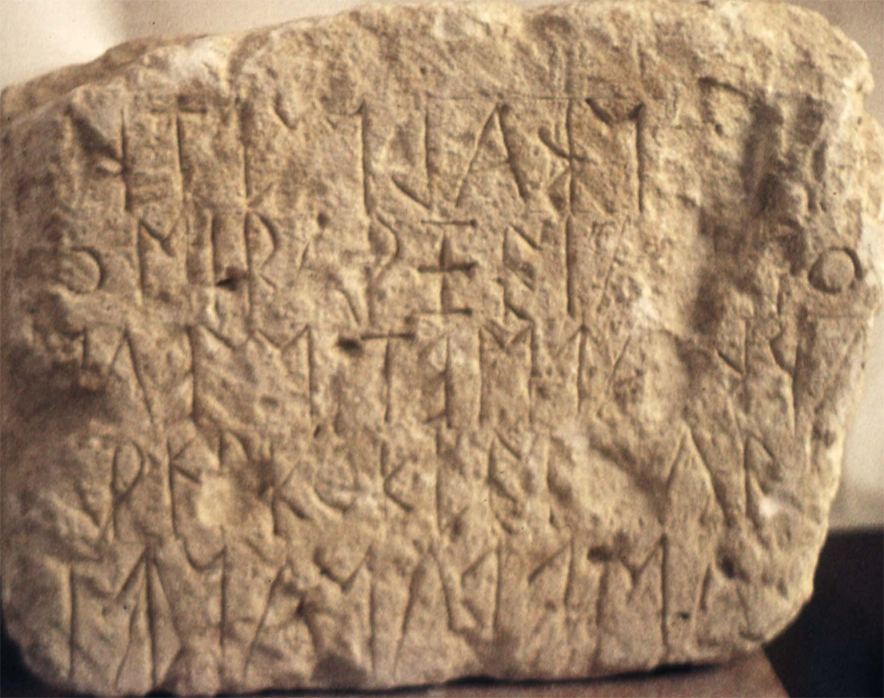
Eteocretan inscriptions from Praesus

Praesus or Praisos (Ancient Greek: Πραῖσος), also Prasus or Prasos (Πρᾶσος), was a Greek city in ancient Crete. Strabo reports that it belonged to the Eteocretes, and contained the temple of the Dictaean Zeus, for Mount Dicte was in the territory of Praesus. Strabo reports Praesus as lying between the promontories Samonium and Chersonesus, at a distance of 60 stadia from the sea, and close to Mount Dicte. However, Strabo confuses Praesus with Priansus, when he says it bordered upon the territory of Leben, and was distant 70 stadia from the sea, and 180 from Gortyn.

The site was populated in Neolithic times, and remnants of Minoan and Mycenaean settlements have also been found. The inhabitants of Praesus believed that the Kouretes were children of Athena and Helios. The city was razed by the inhabitants of Hierapytna in 140 BCE, in a war that pitted Gortyn and Hierapytna against Knossos and its allies. Praesus was mentioned by Theophrastus in On Love: Leucocomas, the beloved of Euxinthetus, gives his lover the task of bringing his dog back from Praesus to Gortyn. The territory of Praesus extended across the island to either sea. It is said to have been the only place in Crete, with the exception of Polichna, that did not take part in the expedition against Camicus in Sicily, in order to avenge the death of Minos. Agathocles the Babylonian, related that the Praesii were accustomed to sacrifice swine before marriage.

The site of Praesus is located north of the modern village of Nea Praisos (formerly Vaveli), which is located in the east of the island on the peninsula of Sitia. The remains of the city are distributed over three hills and include a partially preserved wall.
