= Crete =

Largest Greek island

Crete (Kriti)
Native name: Κρήτη
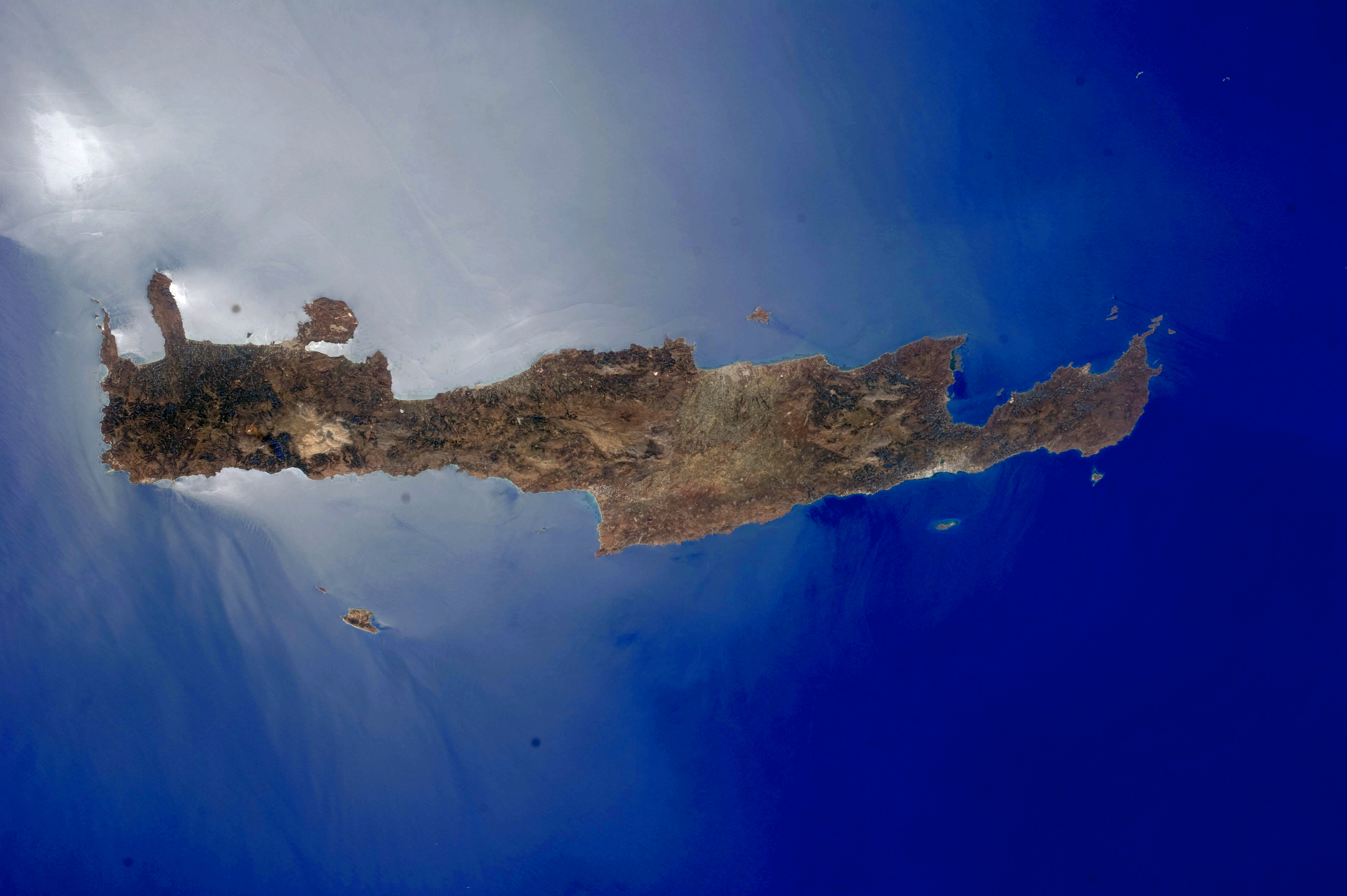
- NASA photograph of Crete

Geography
- Location: Eastern Mediterranean
- Coordinates: 35°12.6′N 24°54.6′E
- Area: 8,450 km^{2} (3,260 sq mi)
- Area rank: 88
- Highest elevation: 2,456 m (8058 ft)
- Highest point: Mount Ida (Psiloritis)

Administration
- Greece
- Region: Crete
- Capital city: Heraklion
- Largest settlement: Heraklion (pop. 144,442)

Demographics
- Demonym: Cretan, archaic Cretian
- Population: 624,408 (2021)
- Population rank: 73
- Pop. density: 74.9/km^{2} (194/sq mi)
- Ethnic groups: Greeks

Additional information
- Time zone: GMT +3
- ISO code: GR-M
- HDI (2023) 0.896 very high · 4th of 13

Crete (/kriːt/ KREET) (Note: Greek: Κρήτη, Modern: Kríti [ˈkriti], Ancient: Krḗtē [krɛ̌ːtεː]) is the largest and most populous island of Greece, the 89th largest island in the world, and the fifth largest island in the Mediterranean Sea, after Sicily, Sardinia, Cyprus, and Corsica. Crete is located approximately 100 km (62 mi) south of the Peloponnese, and about 300 km (190 mi) southwest of Anatolia. Crete has an area of 8,450 km^{2} (3,260 mi^{2}) and a coastline of 1,046 km (650 mi). It bounds the southern border of the Aegean Sea, with the Sea of Crete (or North Cretan Sea) to the north and the Libyan Sea (or South Cretan Sea) to the south. Crete covers 260 km from west to east but is narrow from north to south, spanning three degrees of longitude but only half a degree of latitude.

Crete and its surrounding islands and islets form the Region of Crete (Greek: Περιφέρεια Κρήτης), which is the southernmost of the 13 top-level administrative units of Greece, and the fifth most populous of Greece's regions. Its capital and largest city is Heraklion, located on the island's north shore. As of 2021, the region had a population of 624,408. The Dodecanese are located to the northeast of Crete, while the Cyclades are situated to the north, separated by the Sea of Crete.

Crete was the centre of Europe's first advanced civilization, the Minoans, from 2700 to 1420 BCE. The Minoan civilisation was overrun by the Mycenaean civilization from mainland Greece. Crete was subsequently ruled by Rome, by the Byzantine Empire, briefly by Andalusian Arabs, restored to Byzantine rule, and later by the Venetian Republic and the Ottoman Empire. In 1898 Crete, whose people had for some time wanted to join the Greek state, achieved autonomy under the Ottomans, formally becoming the Cretan State. Crete became part of Greece in December 1913.

Crete is predominantly mountainous, characterised by a range that crosses the island from west to east. It includes Crete's highest point, Mount Ida, and the range of the White Mountains (Lefka Ori) with 30 summits above 2,000 metres (6,600 ft) in altitude and the Samaria Gorge, a World Biosphere Reserve. Crete forms a significant part of the economy and cultural heritage of Greece, while retaining its own local cultural traits (such as its own poetry and music). The Nikos Kazantzakis airport at Heraklion and the Daskalogiannis airport at Chania serve international travellers. The Minoan palace at Knossos is also located in Heraklion. In Greek mythology, Crete is best known as the birthplace of the Greek god Zeus.

== Name ==
kA Z1 I9 U33 Z7 N25Crete
Keftiu
in hieroglyphs

The earliest references to the island of Crete can be found in texts originating from the Syrian city of Mari dated to 18th century BC, where the island is referred to as Kaptara. This is repeated later in Neo-Assyrian records and the Bible (Caphtor). It was known in ancient Egyptian as Keftiu or kftı͗w, strongly suggesting a similar Minoan name for the island.

The current name Crete is first attested in the 15th century BC in Mycenaean Greek texts, written in Linear B, through the words ke-re-te 𐀐𐀩𐀳, *Krētes; later Greek: Κρῆτες [krɛː.tes], plural of Κρής [krɛːs]) and ke-re-si-jo 𐀐𐀩𐀯𐀍, *Krēsijos; later Greek: Κρήσιος [krέːsios], 'Cretian'). In Ancient Greek, the name Crete (Κρήτη) first appears in Homer's Odyssey. Its etymology is currently unknown. One proposal derives it from a hypothetical Luwian word *kursatta (compare kursawar 'island', kursattar 'cutting, sliver'). Another proposal suggests that it derives from the ancient Greek word "κραταιή" (krataie̅), meaning strong or powerful, the reasoning being that Crete was the strongest thalassocracy during ancient times.

In Latin, the name of the island became Creta. The original Arabic name of Crete was Iqrīṭiš (Arabic: اقريطش < (τῆς) Κρήτης), but after the Emirate of Crete's establishment of its new capital at ربض الخندق Rabḍ al-Ḫandaq (modern Heraklion; Greek: Ηράκλειο, Irákleio), both the city and the island became known as Χάνδαξ (Chandax) or Χάνδακας (Chandakas), which gave Latin, Italian, and Venetian Candia, from which were derived French Candie and English Candy or Candia. Under Ottoman rule, in Ottoman Turkish, Crete was called Girit (كريد). In the Hebrew Bible, Crete is referred to as כְּרֵתִים "kretim", in the plural, reflecting its multiple island nature (cf. קפריסין "kafrisin" Cyprus) and as כפתור "kaftor", mirroring both names.

== Physical geography and climate ==
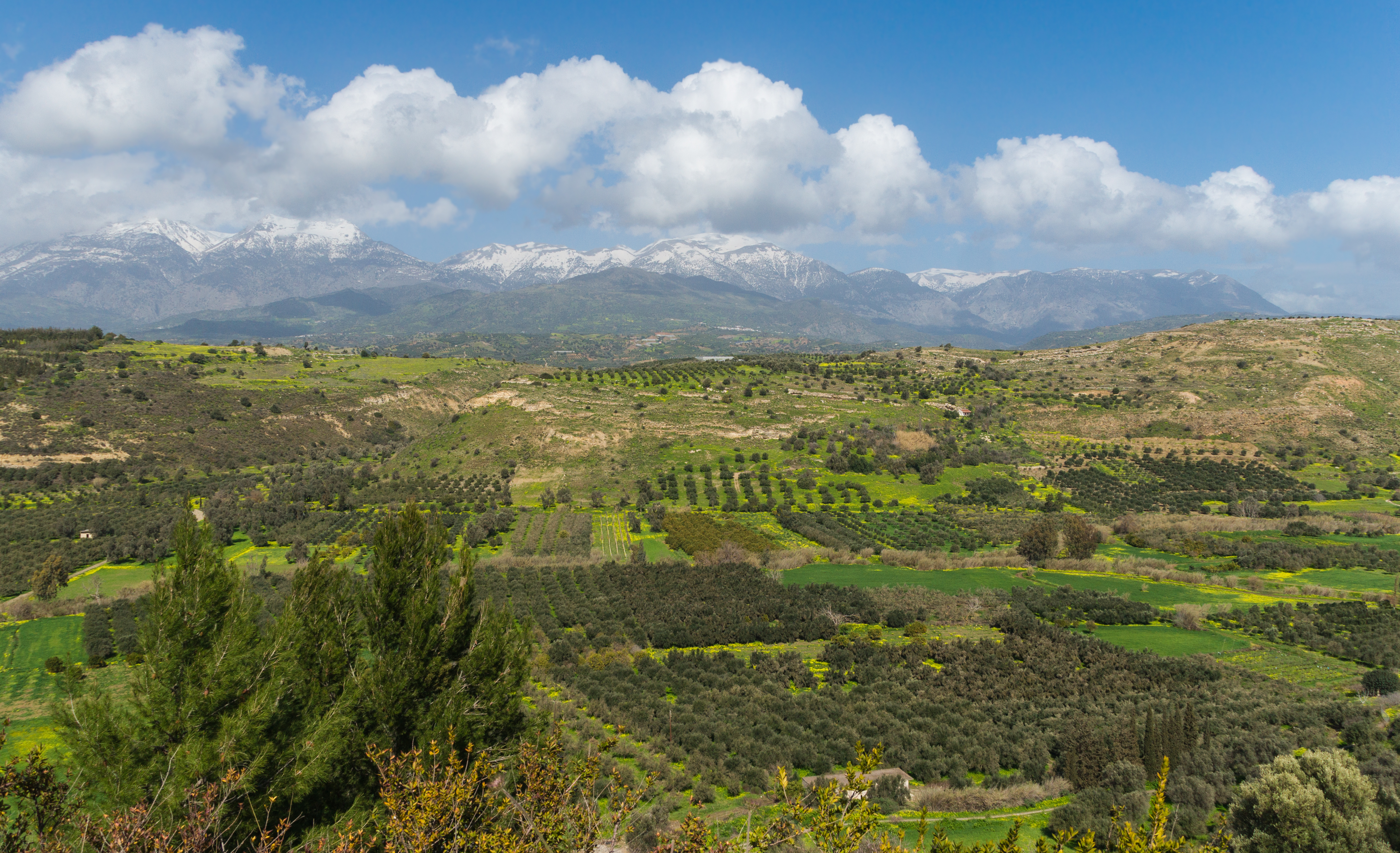
Messara Plain

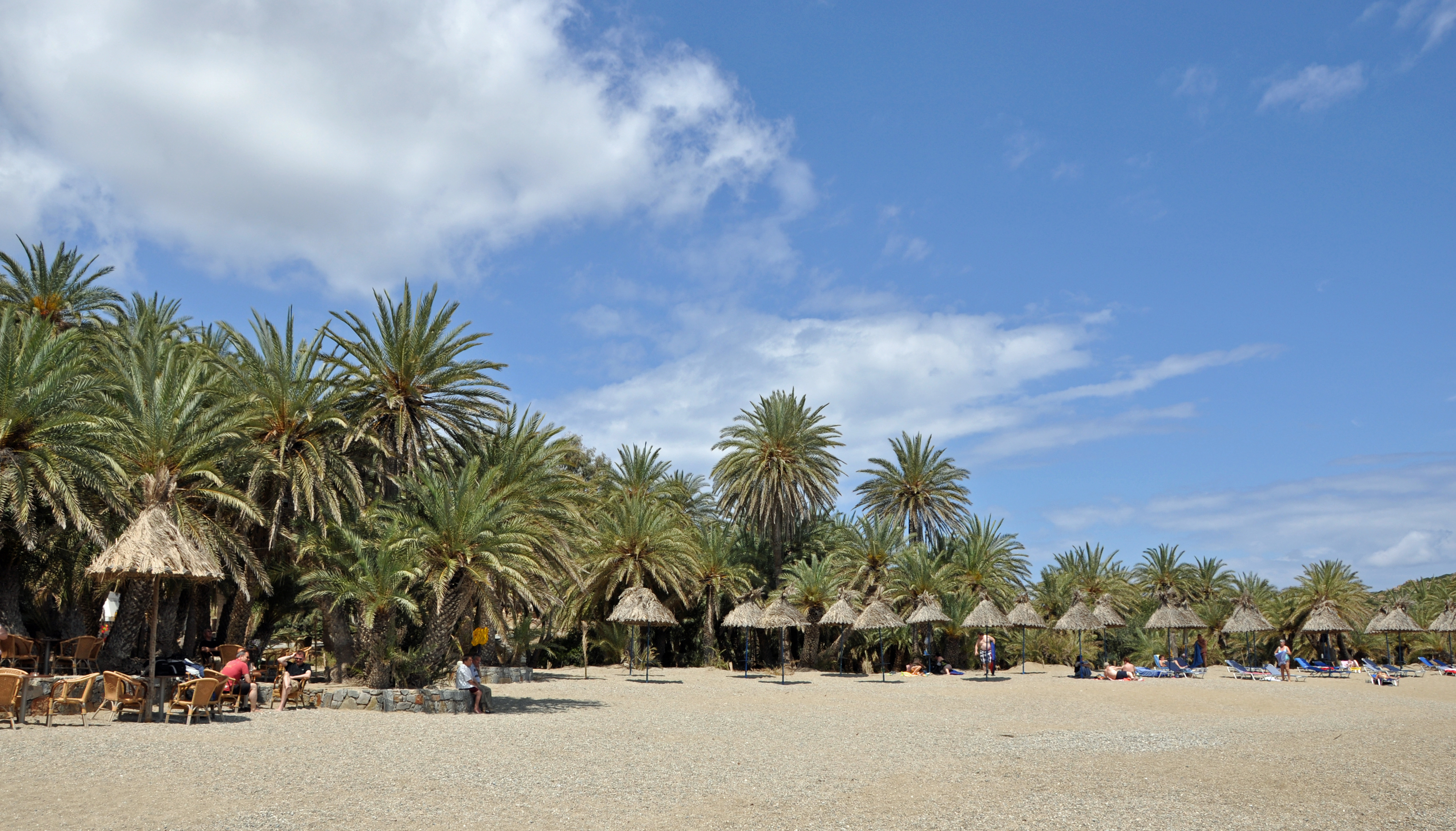
The palm beach of Vai

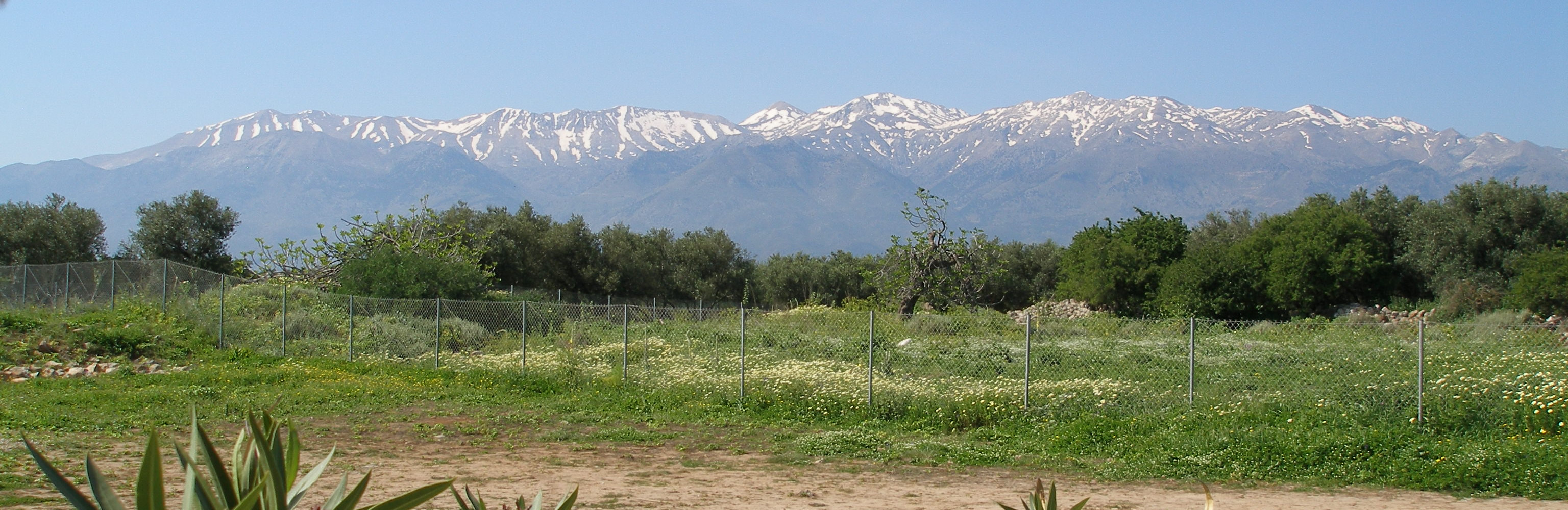
Lefka Ori

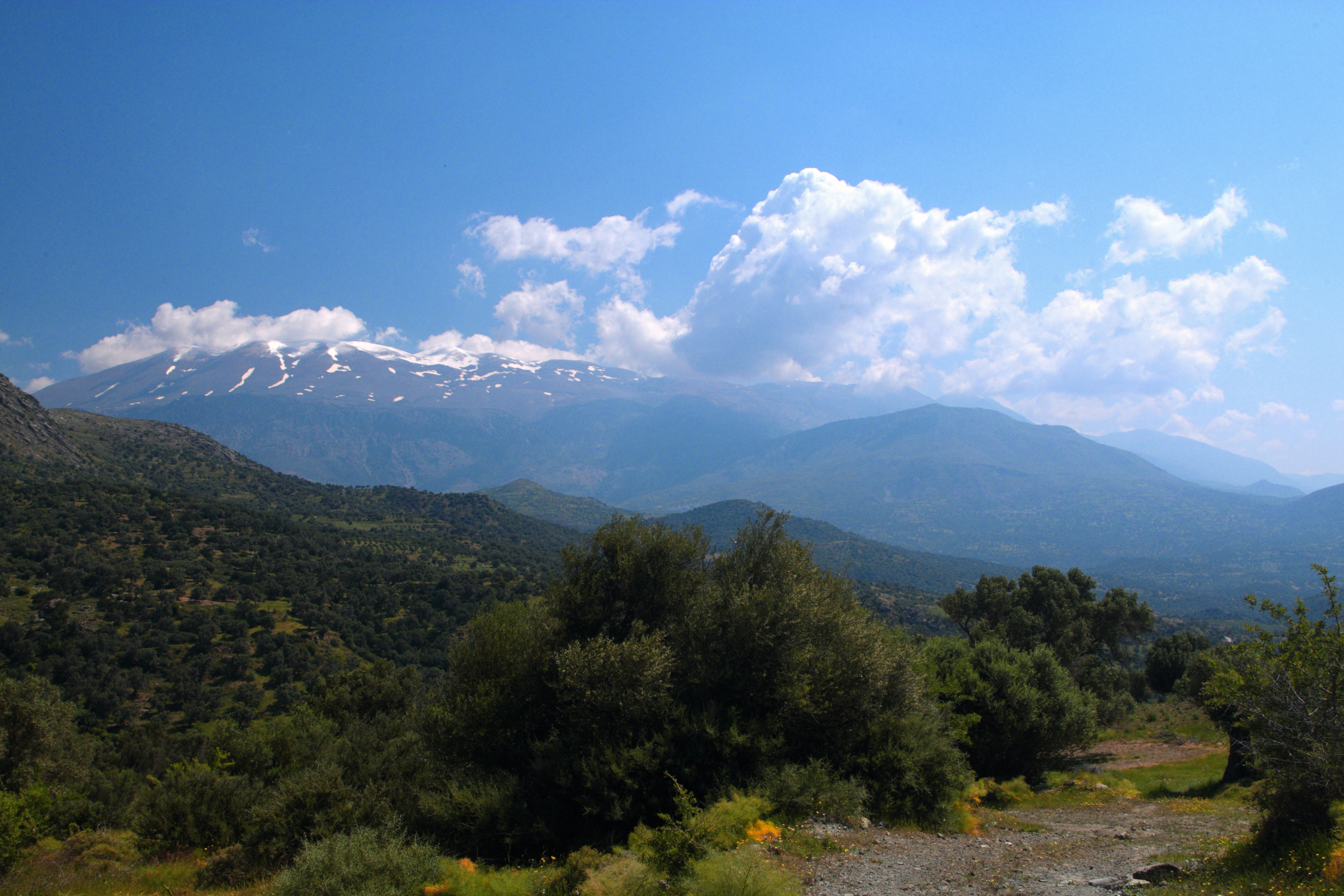
View of Psiloritis

Crete is the largest island in Greece and the fifth largest island in the Mediterranean Sea. It is located south of almost the rest of the country, in the southern part of the Aegean Sea separating the Aegean from the Libyan Sea.

=== Island morphology ===
The island has an elongated shape: it spans 260 km (160 mi) from east to west, is 60 km (37 mi) at its widest point, and narrows to as little as 12 km (7.5 mi) (close to Ierapetra). Crete covers an area of 8,336 km^{2} (3,219 mi^{2}), with a coastline of 1,046 km (650 mi); to the north, it broaches the Sea of Crete (Greek: Κρητικό Πέλαγος); to the south, the Libyan Sea (Greek: Λιβυκό Πέλαγος); in the west, the Myrtoan Sea, and toward the east the Carpathian Sea. It lies approximately 160 km (99 mi) south of the Greek mainland.

There are a number of peninsulas and gulfs on the north side of Crete, from west to east these include: Gramvousa peninsula, Gulf of Kissamos, Rodopos peninsula, Gulf of Chania, Akrotiri peninsula, Souda Bay, Apokoronas cape, Gulf of Almiros, Gulf of Heraklion, Aforesmenos cape, Gulf of Mirabello, Gulf of Sitia and the Sideros peninsula. On the south side of Crete is the Gulf of Messaras and Cape Lithinon.

=== Mountains and valleys ===
Crete is mountainous, and its character is defined by a high mountain range crossing from west to east, formed by six different groups of mountains:

- The Idi Range (Psiloritis) 2,456 m (8,058 ft)
- The White Mountains or Lefka Ori 2,453 m (8,048 ft)
- The Dikti Mountains 2,148 m (7,047 ft)
- Kedros 1,777 m (5,830 ft)
- Thrypti 1,489 m (4,885 ft)
- Asterousia Mountains 1,231 m (4,039 ft)

These mountains lavish Crete with valleys, such as Amari valley, fertile plateaus, such as Lasithi plateau, Omalos and Nidha; caves, such as Gourgouthakas, Diktaion, and Idaion (the birthplace of the ancient Greek god Zeus); and a number of gorges.

The mountains have been seen as a key feature of the island's distinctiveness, especially since the time of Romantic travellers' writing. Contemporary Cretans distinguish between highlanders and lowlanders; the former often claim to reside in places affording a higher/better climatic and moral environment. In keeping with the legacy of Romantic authors, the mountains are seen as having determined their residents' 'resistance' to past invaders which relates to the oft-encountered idea that highlanders are 'purer' in terms of less intermarriages with occupiers.

For residents of mountainous areas, such as Sfakia in western Crete, the aridness and rockiness of the mountains is emphasised as an element of pride and is often compared to the alleged soft-soiled mountains of others parts of Greece or the world.

=== Gorges, rivers and lakes ===
The island has a number of gorges, such as the Samariá Gorge, Imbros Gorge, Kourtaliotiko Gorge, Ha Gorge, Platania Gorge, the Gorge of the Dead (at Kato Zakros, Sitia) and Richtis Gorge and (Richtis) waterfall at Exo Mouliana in Sitia.

The rivers of Crete include the Geropotamos River, the Koiliaris, the Anapodiaris, the Almiros, the Giofyros, the Keritis, and Megas Potamos. There are only two freshwater lakes in Crete: Lake Kournas and Lake Agia, which are both in Chania regional unit. Lake Voulismeni at the coast, at Aghios Nikolaos, was formerly a freshwater lake but is now connected to the sea, in Lasithi. Three artificial lakes created by dams also exist in Crete: the lake of Aposelemis Dam, the lake of Potamos Dam, and the lake of Mpramiana Dam.

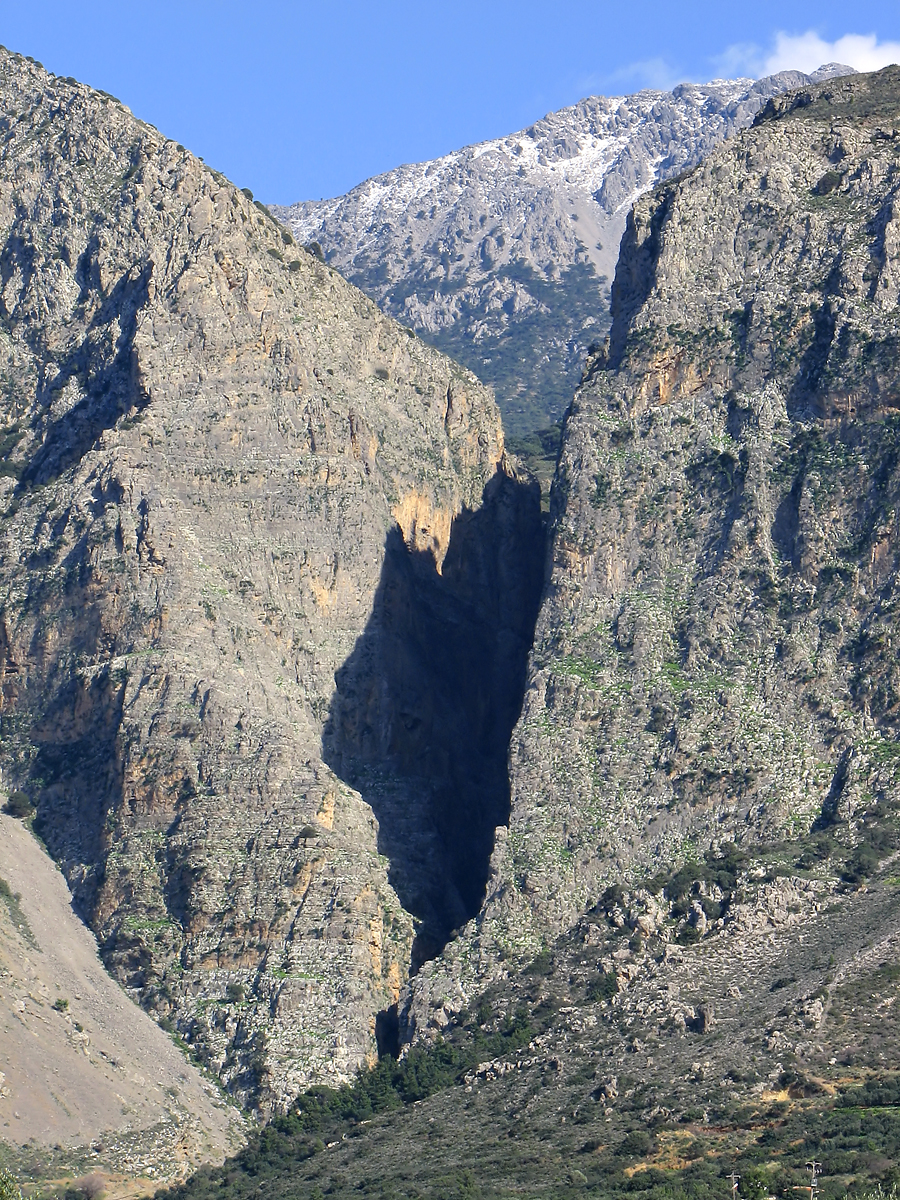
Ha Gorge

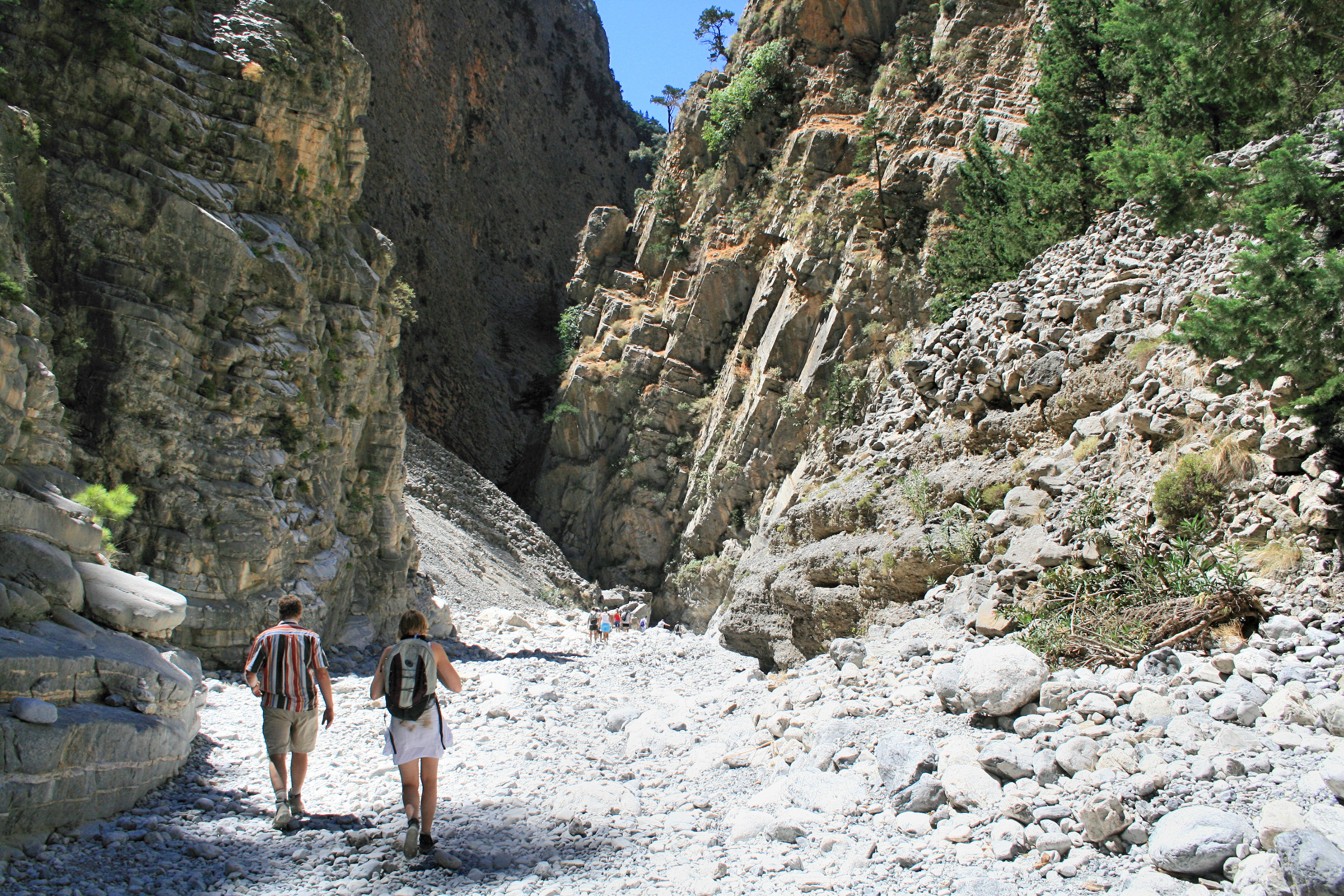
Samariá Gorge

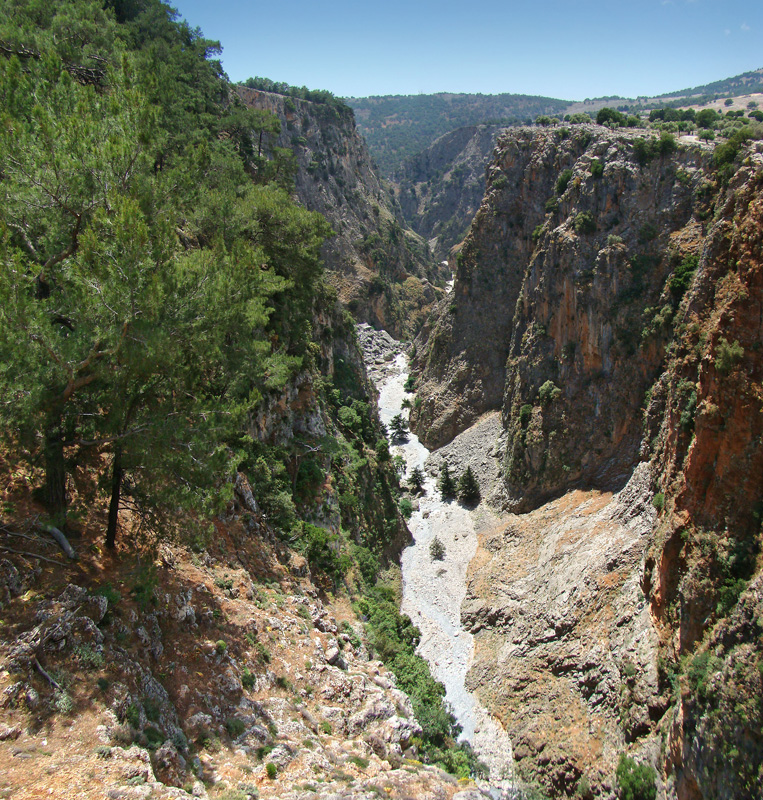
Aradaina Gorge

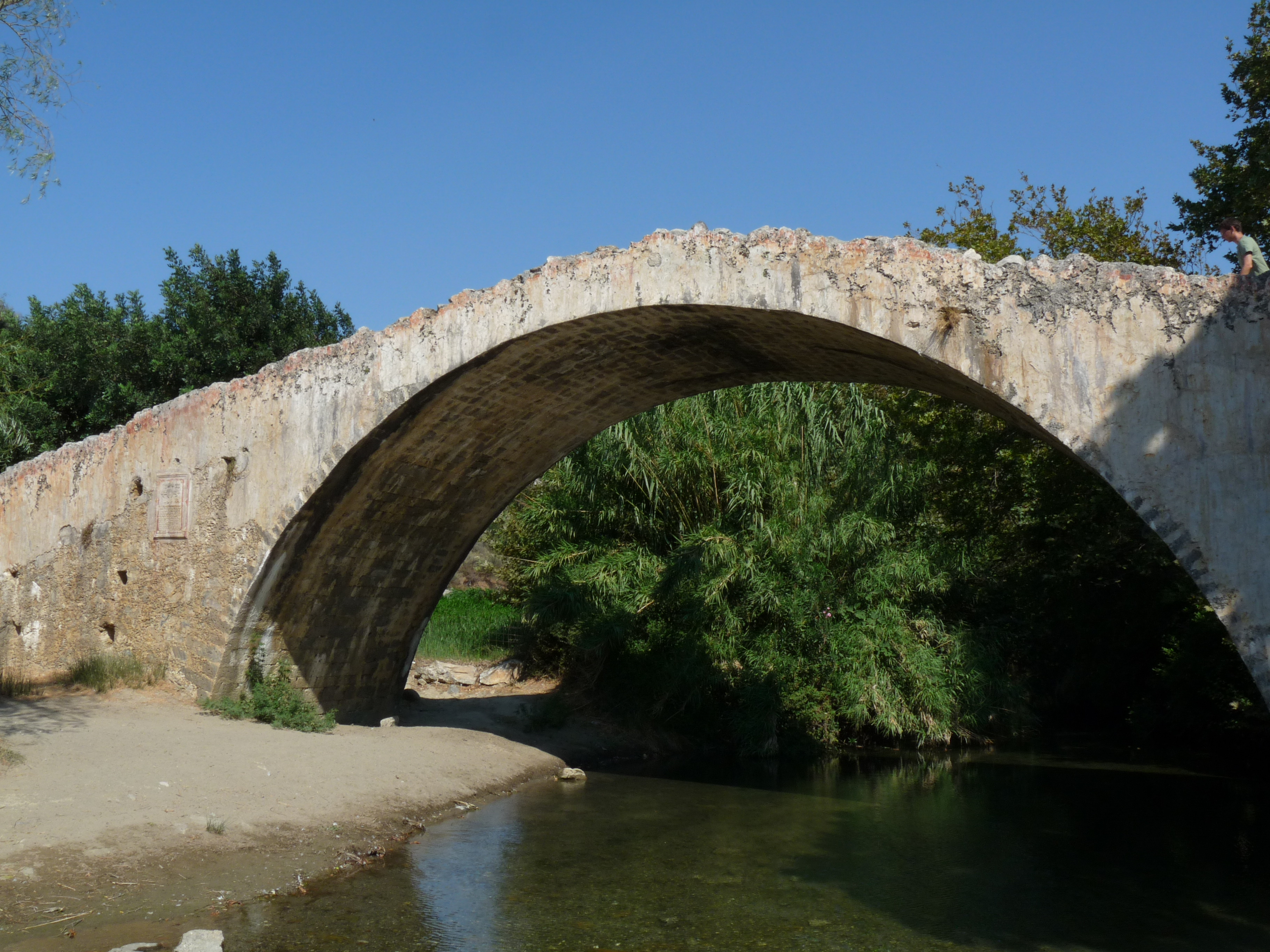
Venetian Bridge over Megalopotamos River

=== Surrounding islands ===
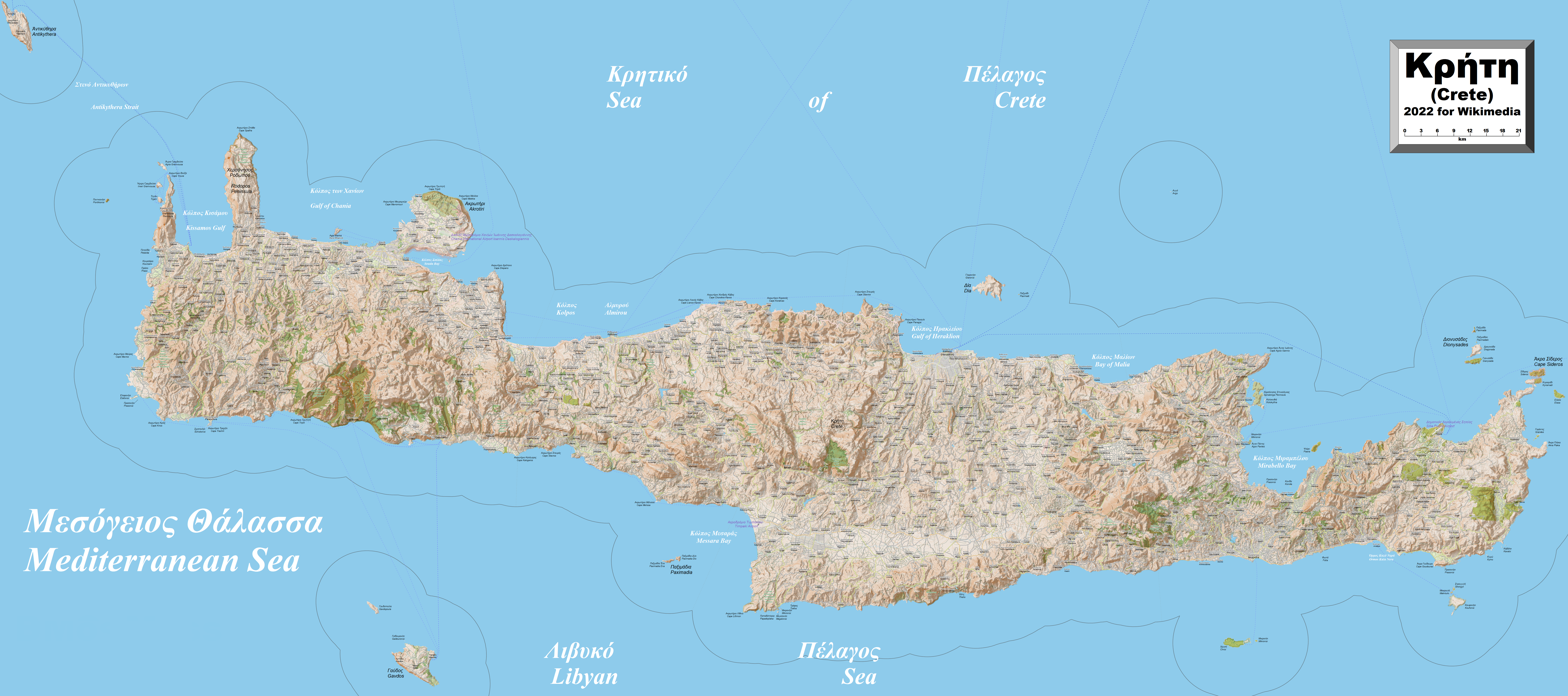
Detailed map of Crete and outlying islands

A large number of islands, islets, and rocks hug the coast of Crete. Many are visited by tourists, some are only visited by archaeologists and biologists. Some are environmentally protected. A small sample of the islands includes:

- Gramvousa (Kissamos, Chania) the pirate island opposite the Balo lagoon
- Elafonisi (Chania), which commemorates a shipwreck and an Ottoman massacre
- Chrysi island (Ierapetra, Lasithi), which hosts the largest natural Juniperus macrocarpa forest in Europe
- Paximadia island (Agia Galini, Rethymno) where the god Apollo and the goddess Artemis were traditionally believed to be born
- The Venetian fort and leper colony at Spinalonga opposite the beach and shallow waters of Elounda (Agios Nikolaos, Lasithi)
- Dionysades islands which are in an environmentally protected region together with the Palm Beach Forest of Vai in the municipality of Sitia, Lasithi

Off the south coast, the island of Gavdos is located 26 nautical miles (48 km) south of Hora Sfakion and is the southernmost point of Europe.

=== Climate ===
Crete straddles two climatic zones, the Mediterranean and the semi-arid climate, mainly falling within the former. As such, the climate in Crete is primarily a hot-summer Mediterranean (Csa) climate while some areas in the south and east have a hot semi-arid climate (Köppen climate classification: BSh). The higher elevations fall into the cold-summer Mediterranean climate category (Csc), while some of the mountain peaks (>2,000 meters) may feature a continental climate (Dfb or Dfc). The atmosphere can be quite humid, depending on the proximity to the sea, while winter is fairly mild. Snowfall is common on the mountains between November and April, but rare in most low-lying areas.

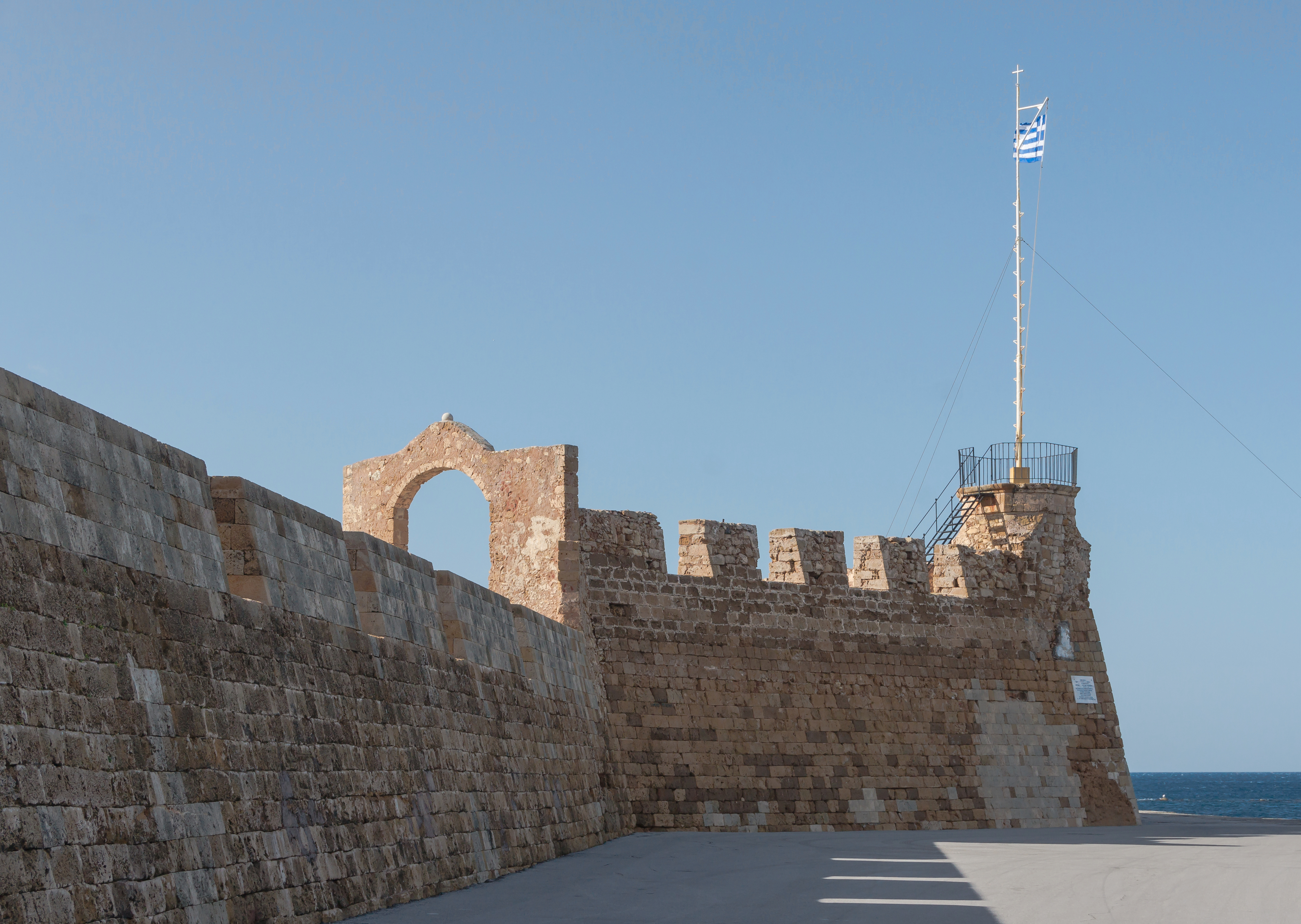
Flag harbour Chania, Crete, Greece

The south coast, including the Mesara Plain and Asterousia Mountains enjoy significantly more sunny days and, on average, higher temperatures throughout the year. There, date palms bear fruit, and swallows remain year-round. The fertile region around Ierapetra, on the southeastern corner of the island, has year-round agricultural production, with summer vegetable and fruit produced in greenhouses throughout the year. Western Crete (Chania province) receives more rain and the soil there suffers more erosion compared to the Eastern part of Crete.

Average annual temperatures reach up to 22.0 °C in Tris Ekklisies and Psari Forada which are located in South Crete. Crete holds the record for the highest temperatures ever recorded in Europe during October, November, January and February among W.M.O. stations. According to the Hellenic National Meteorological Service, South Crete receives the most sunshine in Greece with more than 3,257 hours of sunshine per year.

Climate data for Heraklion 1955–2010 (HNMS)
Month	Jan	Feb	Mar	Apr	May	Jun	Jul	Aug	Sep	Oct	Nov	Dec	Year
Record high °C (°F)	29.9 (85.8)	28.8 (83.8)	34.0 (93.2)	37.5 (99.5)	38.0 (100.4)	41.3 (106.3)	43.6 (110.5)	44.5 (112.1)	39.5 (103.1)	37.0 (98.6)	32.8 (91.0)	28.5 (83.3)	44.5 (112.1)
Mean daily maximum °C (°F)	15.3 (59.5)	15.5 (59.9)	17.0 (62.6)	20.1 (68.2)	23.6 (74.5)	27.3 (81.1)	28.9 (84.0)	28.8 (83.8)	26.6 (79.9)	23.6 (74.5)	20.2 (68.4)	17.1 (62.8)	22.0 (71.6)
Daily mean °C (°F)	12.1 (53.8)	12.2 (54.0)	13.6 (56.5)	16.6 (61.9)	20.4 (68.7)	24.5 (76.1)	26.4 (79.5)	26.3 (79.3)	23.7 (74.7)	20.3 (68.5)	16.8 (62.2)	13.8 (56.8)	18.9 (66.0)
Mean daily minimum °C (°F)	9.1 (48.4)	8.9 (48.0)	9.8 (49.6)	12.0 (53.6)	15.1 (59.2)	19.2 (66.6)	21.9 (71.4)	22.0 (71.6)	19.5 (67.1)	16.7 (62.1)	13.5 (56.3)	10.9 (51.6)	14.9 (58.8)
Record low °C (°F)	0.0 (32.0)	−0.8 (30.6)	0.3 (32.5)	4.2 (39.6)	6.0 (42.8)	12.2 (54.0)	14.5 (58.1)	16.6 (61.9)	12.0 (53.6)	8.7 (47.7)	4.2 (39.6)	2.4 (36.3)	−0.8 (30.6)
Average rainfall mm (inches)	91.0 (3.58)	69.0 (2.72)	53.4 (2.10)	28.2 (1.11)	13.4 (0.53)	2.9 (0.11)	0.8 (0.03)	0.9 (0.04)	16.7 (0.66)	59.4 (2.34)	59.6 (2.35)	85.6 (3.37)	480.9 (18.94)
Average rainy days	16.0	13.6	11.4	7.6	4.6	1.3	0.3	0.5	2.8	7.5	10.6	15.2	91.4
Average relative humidity (%)	68.4	66.4	65.9	62.3	61.2	57.0	57.1	59.1	61.9	65.7	67.9	68.3	63.4
Mean monthly sunshine hours	119.9	132.3	181.5	234.8	298.5	356.2	368.3	343.5	275.8	206.9	145.5	115.4	2,778.6
Source 1: HNMS
Source 2: meteo-climat (extremes)

Climate data for Tris Ekklisies 15 m a.s.l
Month	Jan	Feb	Mar	Apr	May	Jun	Jul	Aug	Sep	Oct	Nov	Dec	Year
Record high °C (°F)	21.5 (70.7)	20.9 (69.6)	25.6 (78.1)	26.8 (80.2)	32.3 (90.1)	41.4 (106.5)	42.1 (107.8)	37.3 (99.1)	36.8 (98.2)	29.8 (85.6)	27.8 (82.0)	22.6 (72.7)	42.1 (107.8)
Mean daily maximum °C (°F)	18.1 (64.6)	16.1 (61.0)	19.4 (66.9)	21.3 (70.3)	24.9 (76.8)	31.0 (87.8)	34.3 (93.7)	32.9 (91.2)	30.3 (86.5)	26.4 (79.5)	22.4 (72.3)	19.5 (67.1)	24.7 (76.5)
Daily mean °C (°F)	15.9 (60.6)	13.8 (56.8)	16.8 (62.2)	18.6 (65.5)	22.0 (71.6)	27.7 (81.9)	30.8 (87.4)	29.8 (85.6)	27.4 (81.3)	23.8 (74.8)	20.1 (68.2)	17.3 (63.1)	22.0 (71.6)
Mean daily minimum °C (°F)	13.7 (56.7)	11.4 (52.5)	14.2 (57.6)	16.0 (60.8)	19.0 (66.2)	24.4 (75.9)	27.3 (81.1)	26.7 (80.1)	24.5 (76.1)	21.3 (70.3)	17.7 (63.9)	15.1 (59.2)	19.3 (66.7)
Record low °C (°F)	5.6 (42.1)	4.4 (39.9)	9.6 (49.3)	9.5 (49.1)	14.3 (57.7)	17.7 (63.9)	22.9 (73.2)	23.9 (75.0)	18.8 (65.8)	17.8 (64.0)	11.9 (53.4)	9.9 (49.8)	4.4 (39.9)
Average rainfall mm (inches)	64.7 (2.55)	85.1 (3.35)	30.6 (1.20)	20.1 (0.79)	17.1 (0.67)	18.7 (0.74)	1.1 (0.04)	0.2 (0.01)	29.7 (1.17)	0.7 (0.03)	78.1 (3.07)	101.9 (4.01)	448 (17.63)
Source: Cultural Association of Tris Ekklisies, CW (Dec 2022-Sep 2025)

== Human geography ==
Crete is the most populous island in Greece, with a population of over 600,000. Approximately 42% of residents live in the island's main cities and towns, while 45% reside in rural areas.

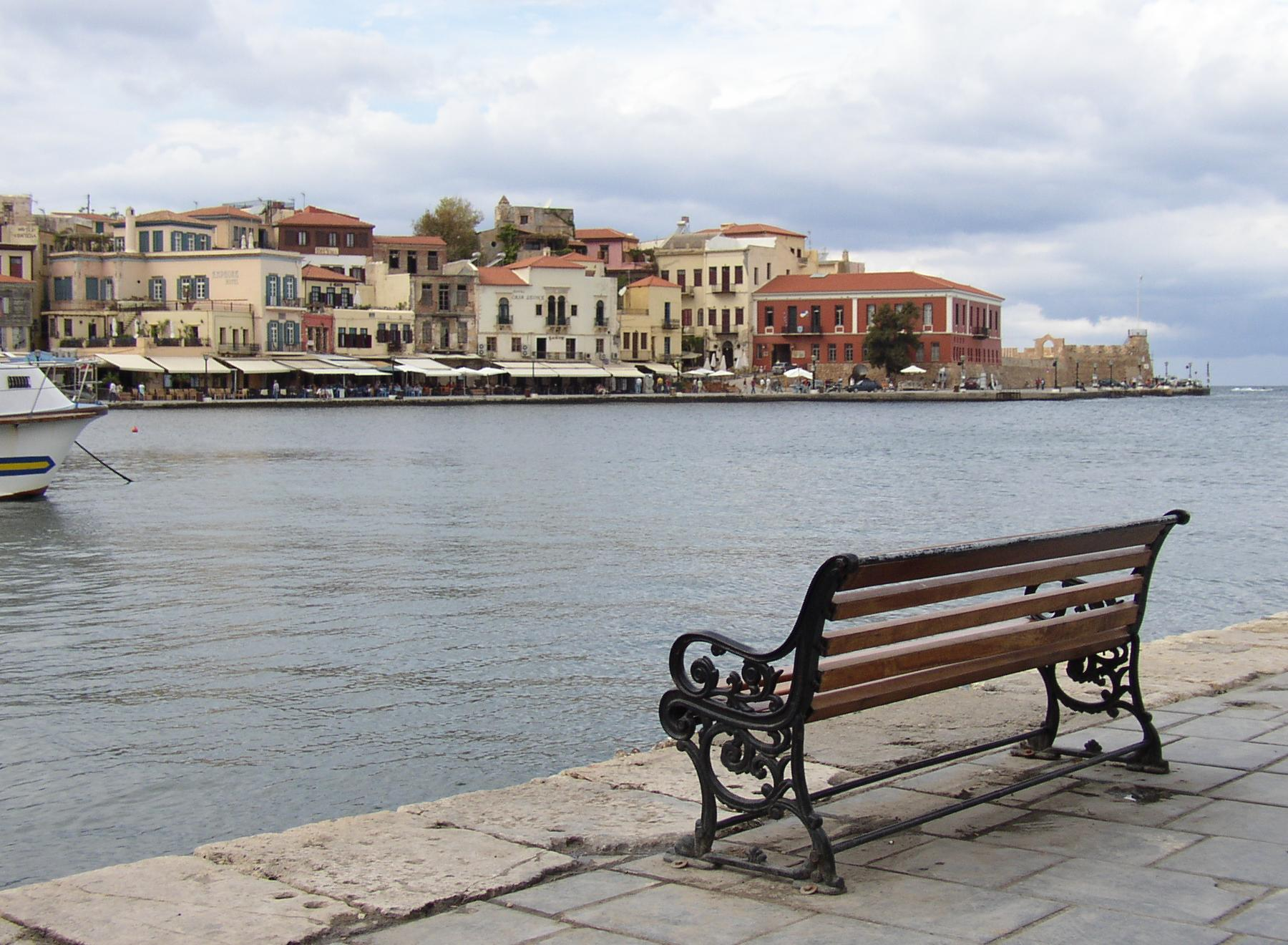
Venetian harbour in Chania

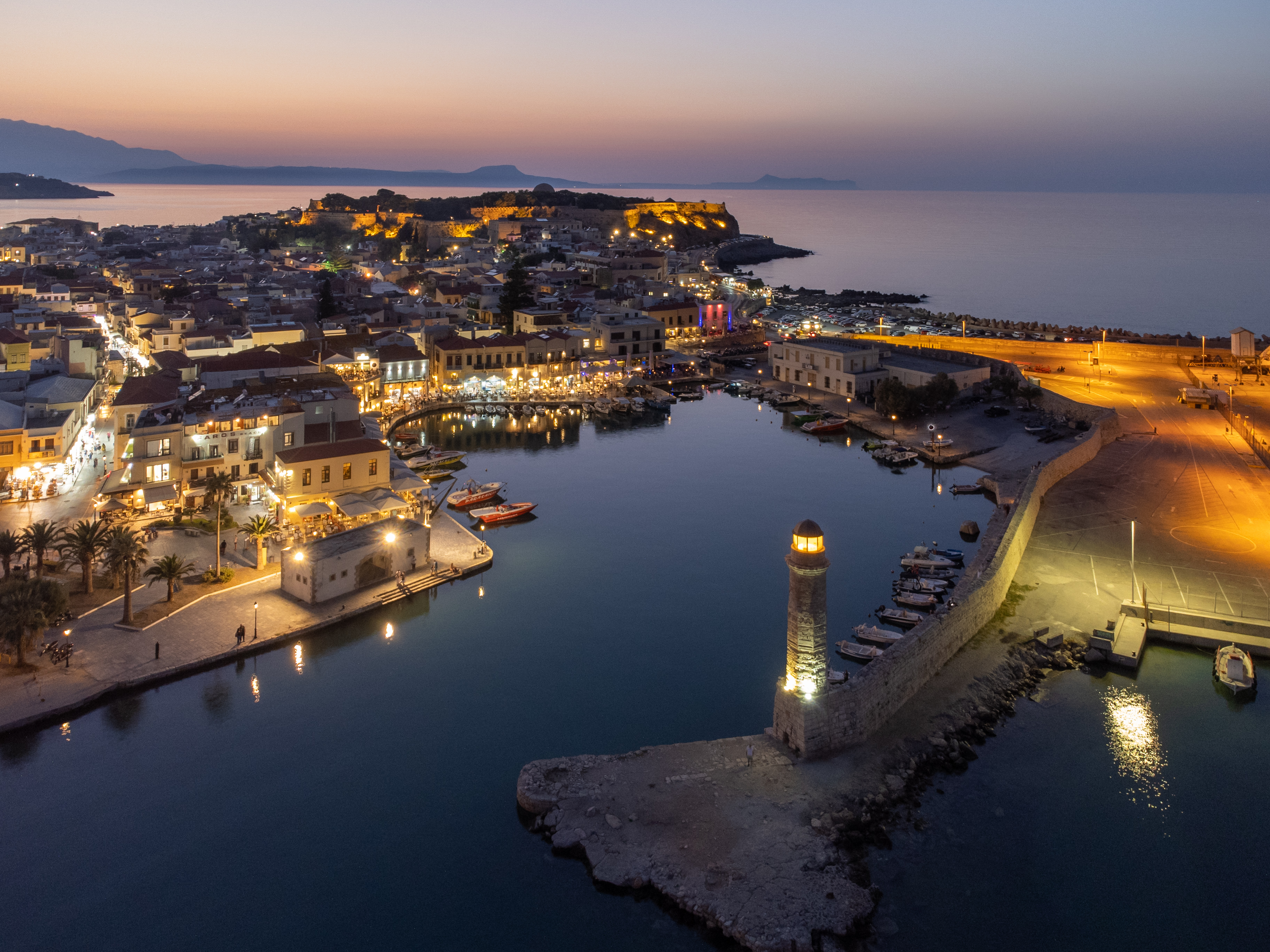
Dusk airview of the Old Harbour of Rethymno

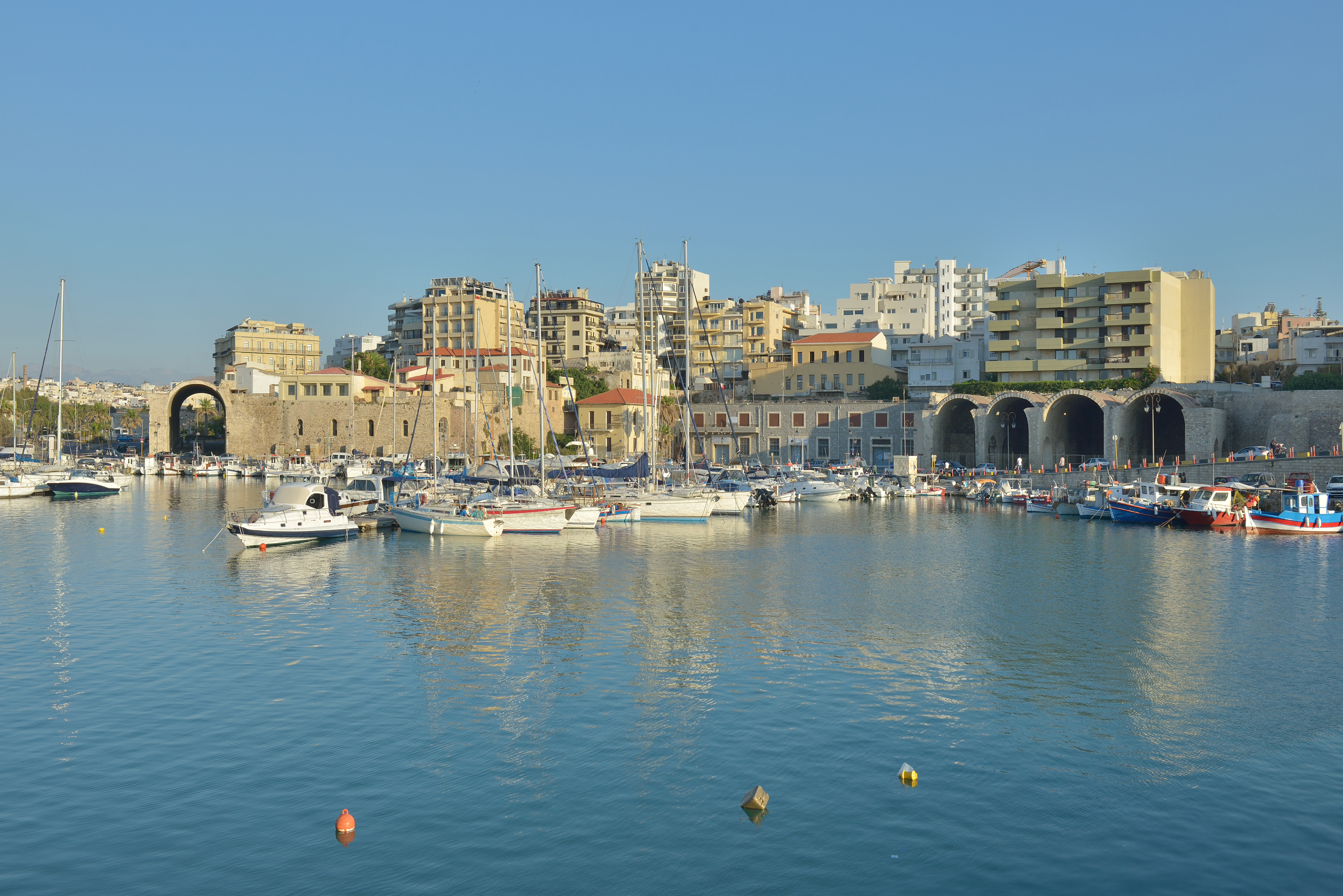
View of the harbour in Heraklion

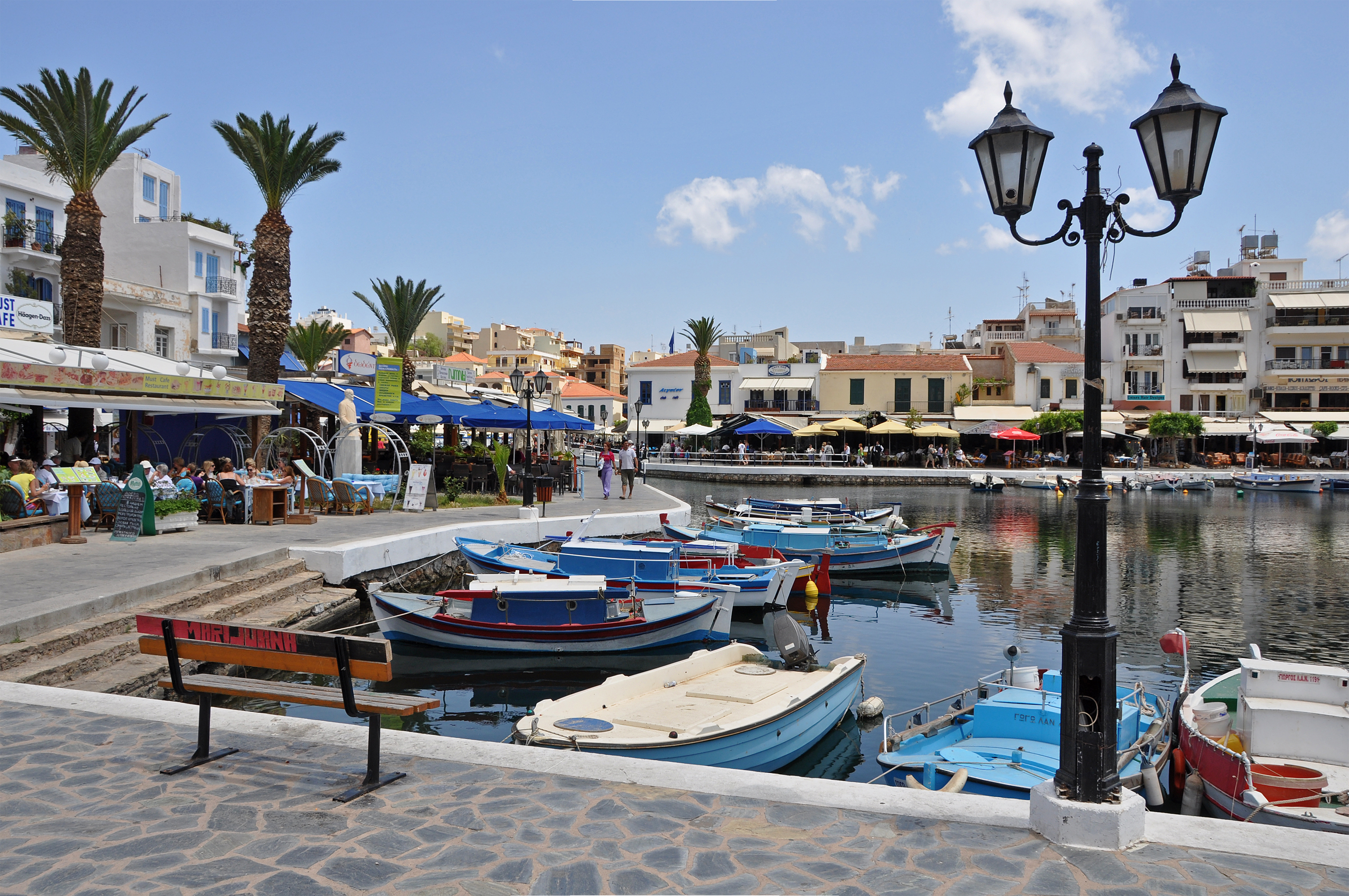
The old harbour in Agios Nikolaos

=== Administration ===
Crete Region Περιφέρεια Κρήτης (Greek) Periféria Krítis
- Administrative region of Greece
- Logo

- Coordinates: 35°13′N 24°55′E
- Country: Greece
- Established: 1912
- Capital: Heraklion
- Regional units: List: Chania; Heraklion; Rethymno; Lasithi

Government
  - Regional governor: Stavros Arnaoutakis (PASOK – Movement for Change)

Area
  - Total: 8,335.88 km^{2} (3,218.50 sq mi)

Population (2021)
  - Total: 624,408
  - Density: 74.9061/km^{2} (194.006/sq mi)

GDP
  - Total: €11.471 billion (2023)
- Time zone: UTC+2 (EET)
  - Summer (DST): UTC+3 (EEST)
- ISO 3166 code: GR-M
- Website: www.crete.gov.gr

Crete with its nearby islands form the Crete Region (Greek: Περιφέρεια Κρήτης, Periféria Krítis, [periˈferia ˈkritis]), one of the 13 regions of Greece which were established in the 1987 administrative reform. Under the 2010 Kallikratis plan, the powers and authority of the regions were redefined and extended. The region is based at Heraklion and is divided into four regional units (pre-Kallikratis prefectures). From west to east these are: Chania, Rethymno, Heraklion, and Lasithi. These are further subdivided into 24 municipalities.

Since 1 January 2011, the regional governor is Stavros Arnaoutakis of the Panhellenic Socialist Movement. First elected in 2010, he was re-elected in 2014, 2019 and 2023.

=== Cities ===
Heraklion is the largest city and capital of Crete, holding more than a fourth of the island's population. Chania was the capital until 1971. The principal cities are:

- Heraklion (Iraklion or Candia) (144,422 inhabitants)
- Chania (Haniá) (88,525 inhabitants)
- Rethymno (34,300 inhabitants)
- Ierapetra (23,707 inhabitants)
- Agios Nikolaos (20,679 inhabitants)
- Sitia (14,338 inhabitants)
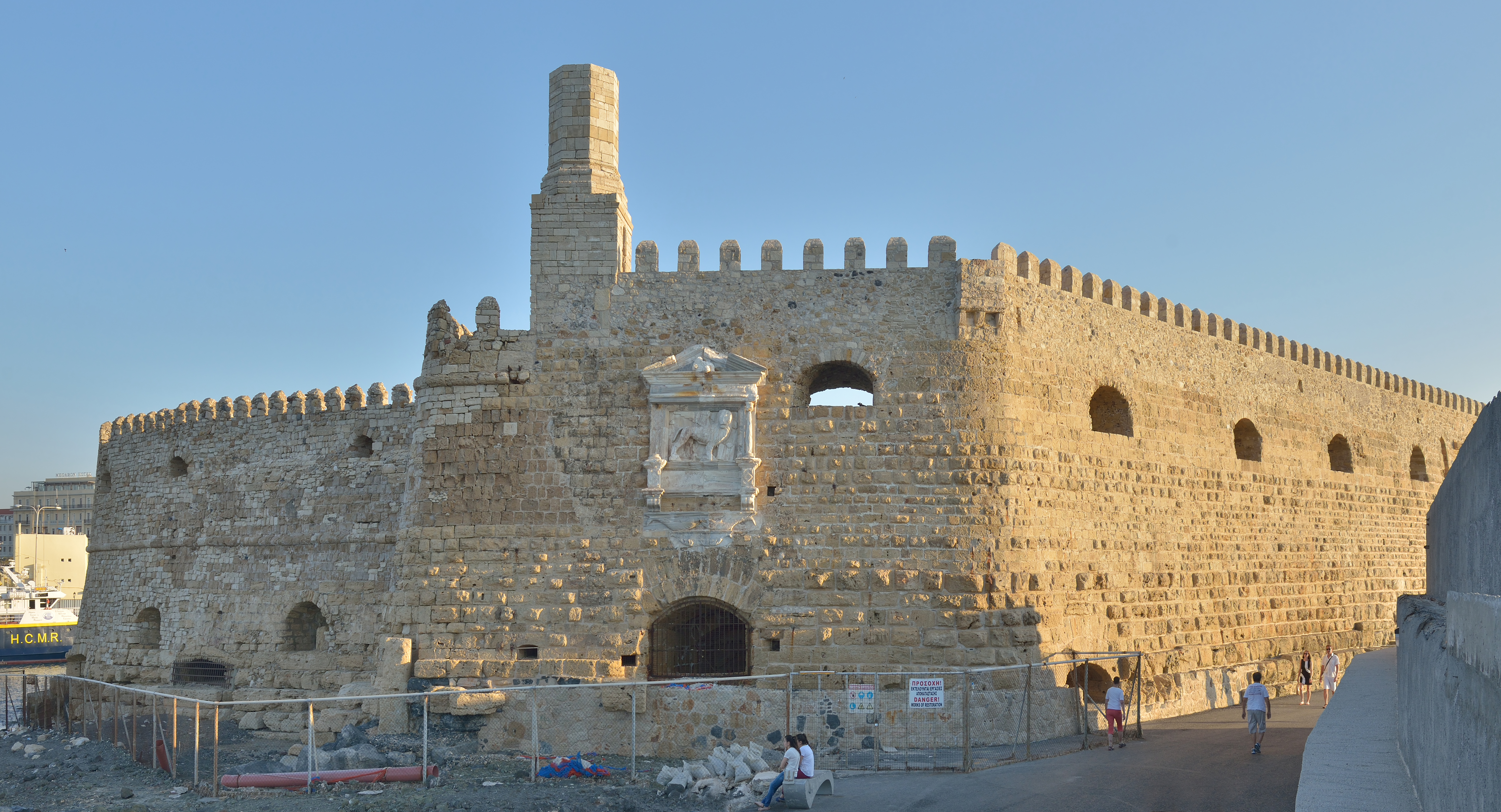
Venetian fortress in Heraklion

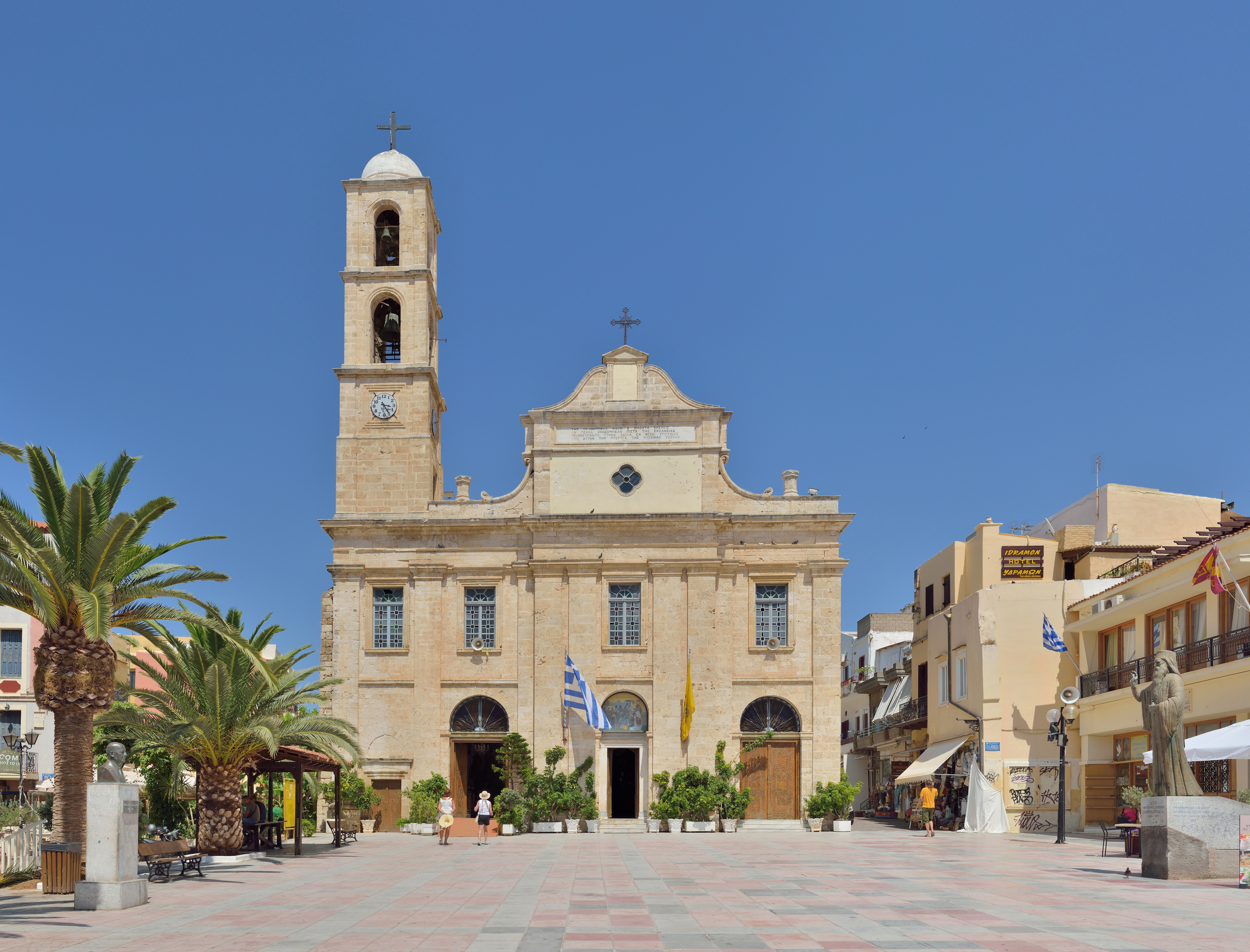
Chania cathedral

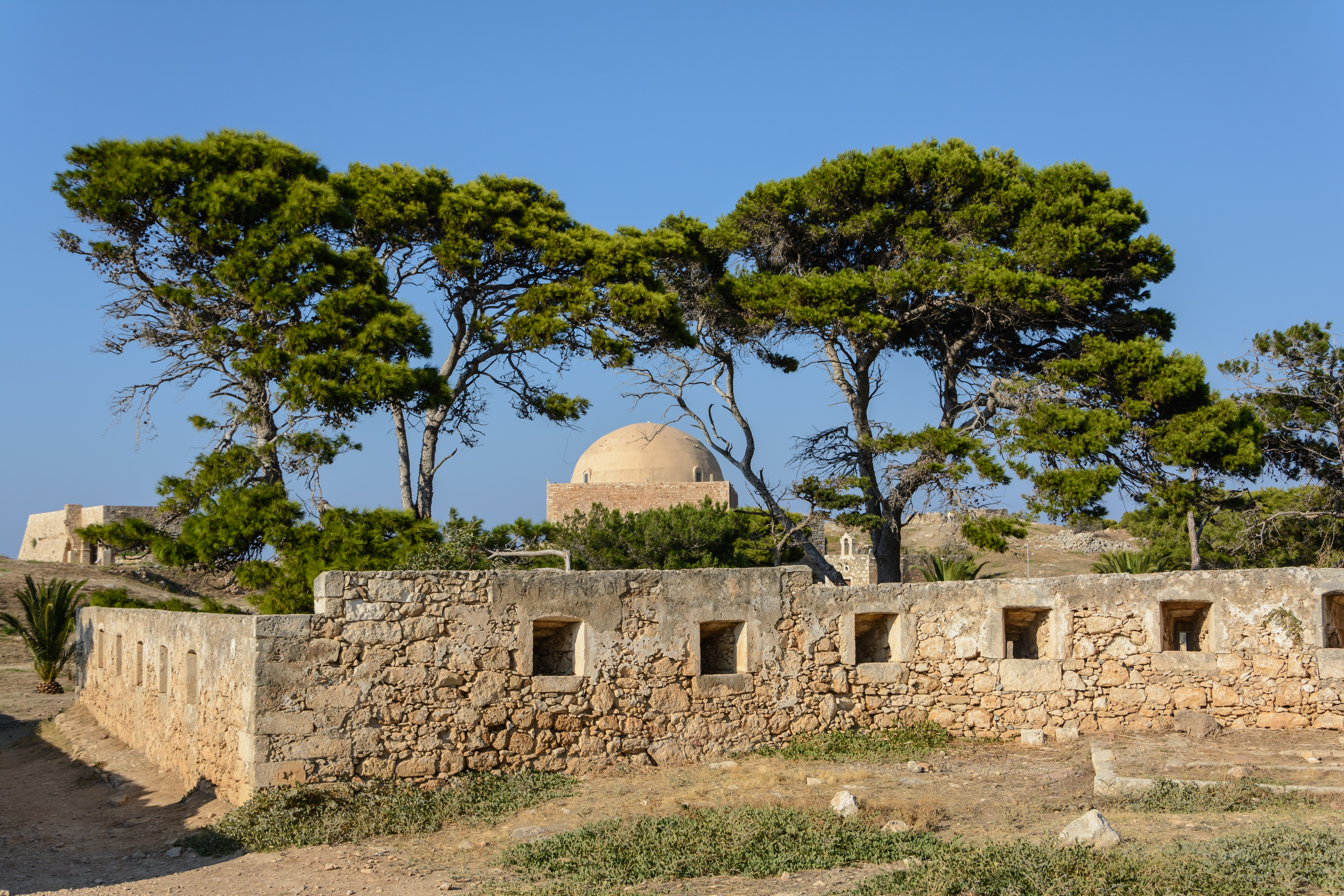
Rethymno Fortezza Mosque

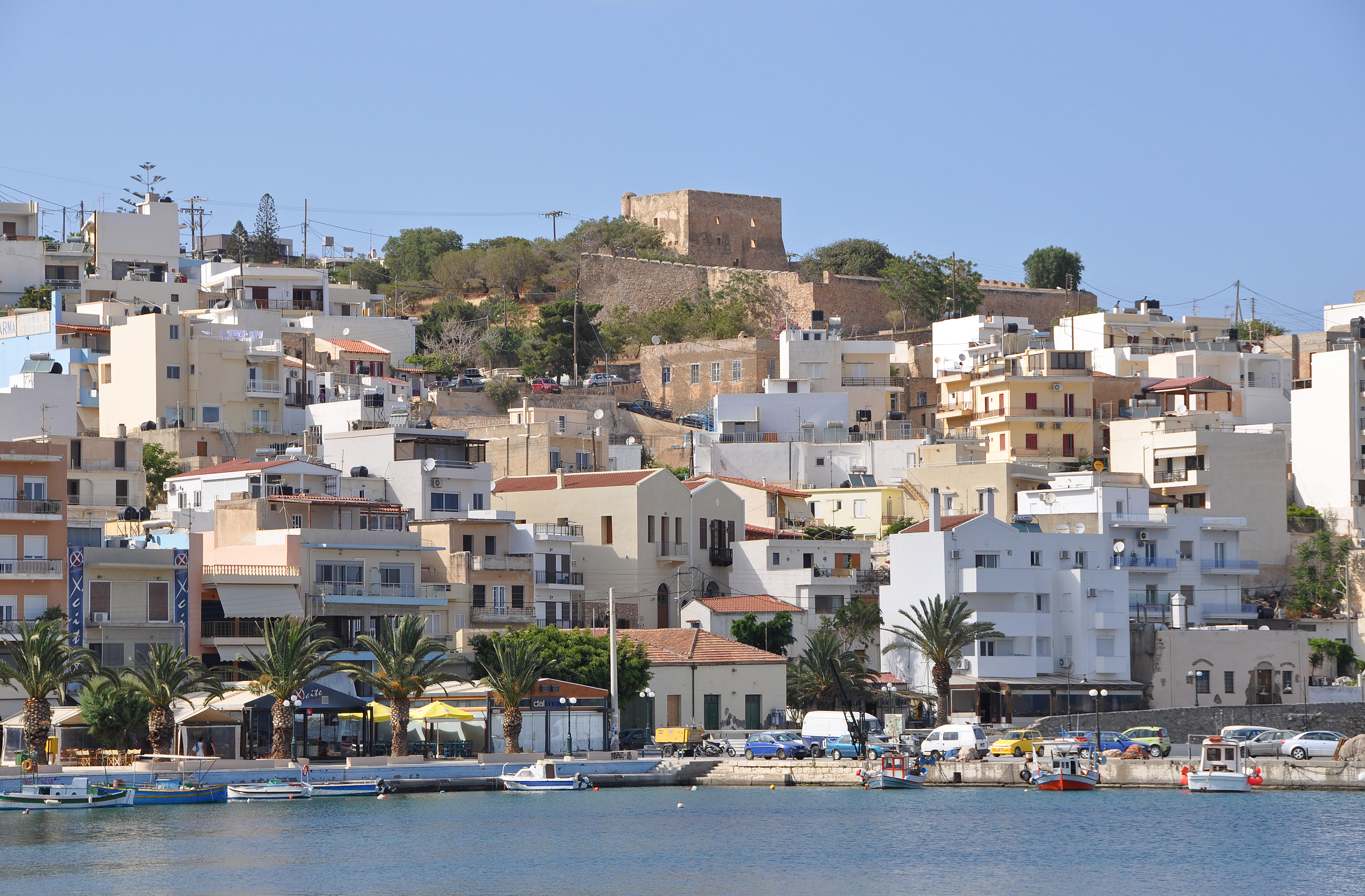
Kazarma fortress at the top in Sitia

=== Demographics ===
According to official census data by the Hellenic Statistical Authority, the region's population has increased by 1,343 people between 2011 and 2021, experiencing a rise of 0.22%. The island is home to 308,608 men and 315,800 women, accounting for 49.4% and 50.6% of the population respectively.

Population of Crete according to ELSTAT
Year	1981	1991	2001	2011	2021
Pop.	502,165	540,054	601,131	623,065	624,408
±%	—	+7.5%	+11.3%	+3.6%	+0.2%

The island is divided into four regional units, Heraklion, Rethymno, Chania, and Lasithi.

Cretan regional units by population according to ELSTAT
Regional Unit	Population (2021)	Change between 2011 and 2021 (%)
Heraklion	305,017	-0.2%
Lasithi	77,819	+3.2%
Rethymno	84,866	-0.9%
Chania	156,706	+0.1%

==== Vital statistics ====
Vital statistics of Crete according to ELSTAT
	Average population (1 January 1991 onwards)	Live births	Deaths	Natural change	Crude birth rate (per 1000)	Crude death rate (per 1000)	Natural change (per 1000)	Total Fertility Rates
1981	501,909	7,471	4,591	2,880	14.9	9.2	5.7	
1982	505,705	7,499	4,419	3,080	14.8	8.7	6.1	
1983	509,133	7,217	4,849	2,368	14.2	9.5	4.7	
1984	512,169	7,097	4,617	2,480	13.9	9.0	4.9	
1985	514,669	6,356	4,754	1,602	12.4	9.2	3.2	
1986	517,457	6,356	4,726	1,630	12.3	9.1	3.2	
1987	520,470	6,285	4,927	1,358	12.1	9.5	2.6	
1988	523,904	6,356	4,953	1,403	12.1	9.5	2.6	
1989	529,474	5,939	4,842	1,097	11.2	9.2	2.0	
1990	535,367	6,173	4,839	1,334	11.5	9.0	2.5	
1991	538,470	6,225	4,850	1,375	11.6	9.0	2.6	
1992	543,879	6,192	5,211	981	11.4	9.6	1.8	
1993	547,999	5,935	5,090	845	10.8	9.3	1.5	
1994	552,109	6,171	5,087	1,084	11.2	9.2	2.0	
1995	556,202	5,943	5,285	658	10.7	9.4	1.3	
1996	560,402	6,099	5,216	883	10.9	9.3	1.6	
1997	564,357	6,119	5,327	792	10.8	9.4	1.4	
1998	568,932	5,979	5,267	712	10.5	9.3	1.2	
1999	572,535	6,061	5,355	706	10.6	9.4	1.2	
2000	575,599	6,324	5,514	810	11.0	9.6	1.4	
2001	579,672	6,567	5,346	1,221	11.3	9.2	1.9	
2002	589,844	6,472	5,481	991	11.0	9.3	1.7	
2003	593,143	6,685	5,609	1,076	11.3	9.5	1.8	
2004	596,426	6,878	5,324	1,554	11.5	8.9	2.6	
2005	600,490	6,901	5,529	1,372	11.5	9.2	2.3	
2006	604,682	7,399	5,633	1,766	12.2	9.3	2.9	
2007	608,988	7,500	5,746	1,754	12.3	9.4	2.9	
2008	613,144	8,009	5,560	2,449	13.1	9.1	4.0	
2009	618,317	7,939	5,434	2,505	12.8	8.8	4.0	
2010	623,113	7,693	5,573	2,120	12.4	8.9	3.5	
2011	627,144	6,946	5,692	1,254	11.1	9.1	2.0	
2012	628,498	6,923	5,881	1,042	11.0	9.4	1.6	
2013	628,388	6,339	5,580	759	10.1	8.9	1.2	1.42
2014	628,377	6,359	5,792	567	10.1	9.2	0.9	1.44
2015	628,178	6,370	6,161	209	10.1	9.8	0.3	1.47
2016	627,576	6,619	5,962	657	10.6	9.5	1.1	1.55
2017	627,362	6,251	6,394	-143	10.0	10.2	-0.2	1.49
2018	627,027	6,241	5,985	256	10.0	9.6	0.4	1.52
2019	627,119	6,266	6,418	-152	10.0	10.2	-0.2	1.54
2020	627,163	6,199	6,365	-166	9.9	10.2	-0.3	1.56
2021	625,872	6,530	6,971	-441	10.4	11.1	-0.7	1.73
2022	623,900	5,772	7,046	-1,274	9.3	11.3	-2.0	1.62
2023	622,246	5,500	6,673	-1,173	8.8	10.7	-1.9	1.57
2024	621,442	5,174	6,605	-1,431	8.3	10.6	-2.3	1.51
2025	621,121							

=== Economy ===
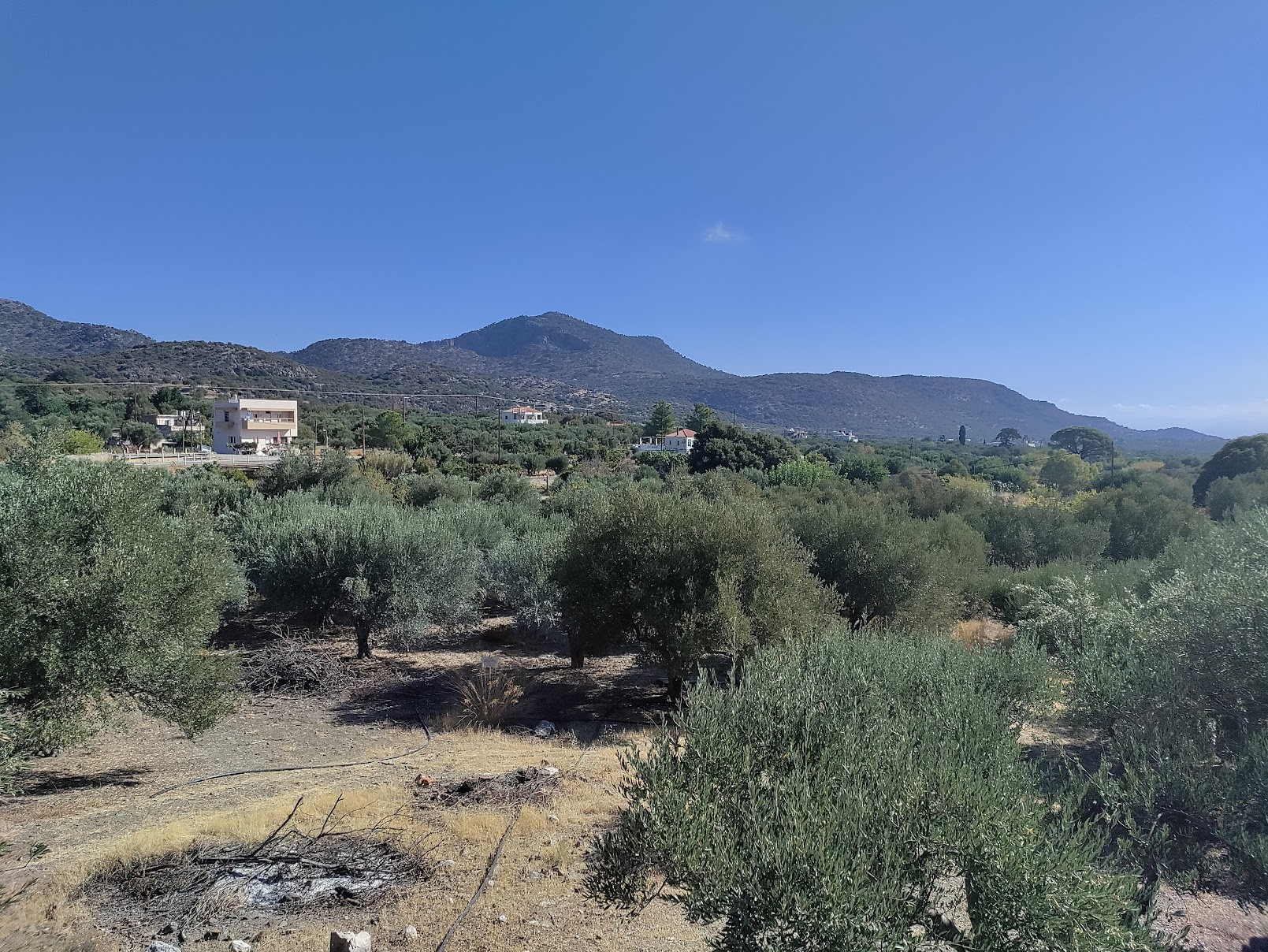
An irrigated olive grove near Kritsa. Many local producers are part of the Agricultural Cooperative of Kritsa.

The economy of Crete is predominantly based on services and tourism. However, agriculture also plays an important role and Crete is one of the few Greek islands that can support itself without a tourism industry. The economy began to change visibly during the 1970s as tourism gained in importance. Although an emphasis remains on agriculture and stock breeding, because of the climate and terrain of the island, there has been a drop in manufacturing, and an observable expansion in its service industries (mainly tourism-related). All three sectors of the Cretan economy (agriculture/farming, processing-packaging, services), are directly connected and interdependent. The island has a per capita income much higher than the Greek average, whereas unemployment is at approximately 4%, one-sixth of that of the country overall.

As in many regions of Greece, viticulture and olive groves are significant; oranges, citrons, avocadoes and bananas are also cultivated. Dairy products are important to the local economy and there are a number of specialty cheeses such as mizithra, anthotyros, and kefalotyri. 20% of Greek wine is produced in Crete, mostly in the region of Peza.

The Gross domestic product (GDP) of the region was €9.4 billion in 2018, accounting for 5.1% of Greek economic output. GDP per capita adjusted for purchasing power was €17,800 or 59% of the EU27 average in the same year. The GDP per employee was 68% of the EU average. Crete is the region in Greece with the fifth highest GDP per capita.

=== Transport infrastructure ===
==== Airports ====
The island has three significant airports, Nikos Kazantzakis at Heraklion, the Daskalogiannis airport at Chania and the smaller Sitia airport. The first two serve international routes, acting as the main gateways to the island for travellers. Nikos Kazantzakis was Greece’s second-busiest airport through the year of 2024. Work has begun plan to replace Heraklion airport with a new airport at Kasteli, where there is presently an air force base, and the new Kasteli Airport is due to open by 2027.

==== Ferries ====
The island is well served by ferries, mostly from Piraeus, by ferry companies such as Minoan Lines and ANEK Lines with links to the Cyclades and Dodecanese islands. Seajets also operates routes to Cyclades.

The main ports from west to east are at Kissamos (ferry link to Peloponnese), Souda (Chania), Rethymno, Heraklion (links to Cyclades), Agios Nikolaos and Sitia (link to Dodecanese).

==== Road network ====
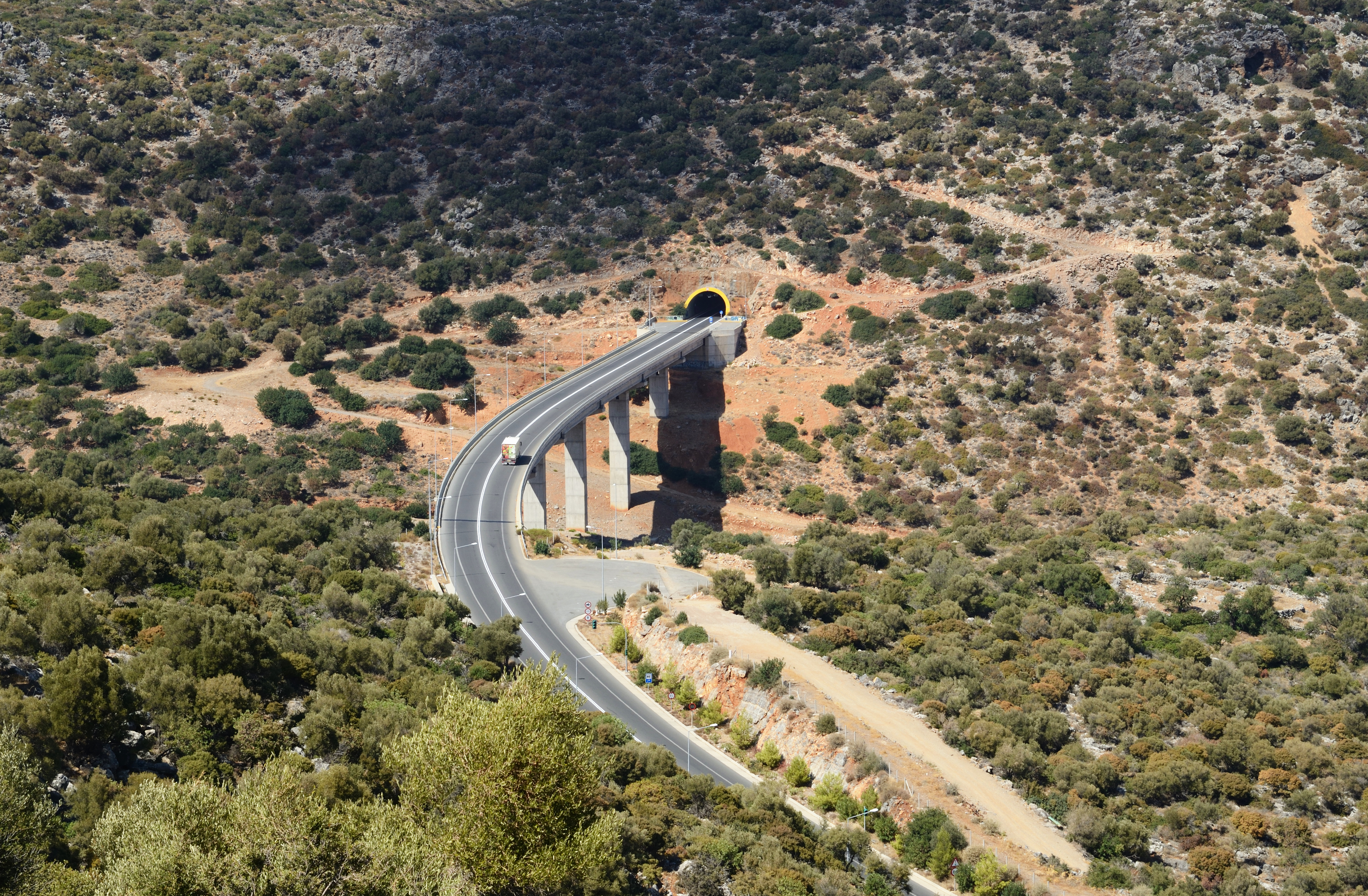
A90 motorway near Malia

Most of Crete is served by the road network. A modern highway is currently being upgraded along the north coast connecting the four major cities (A90 motorway), the sections bypassing the main cities (Heraklion to Malia, Rethymno, Chania to Kolymvari) are at motorway standard, while the sections in between, and west to Kissamos and east to Sitia, should be completed by 2028. A link will also connect to the new Kasteli international airport .

In addition, a European Union study has been devised to promote a modern highway to connect the northern and southern parts of the island via a tunnel. The study proposal includes a 15.7 km (9.8 mi) section of road between the villages of Agia Varvara and Agia Deka in central Crete. The new road section forms part of the route between Messara in the south and Crete's largest city Heraklion, which houses the island's biggest airport and ferry links with mainland Greece.

==== Railway ====
Also, during the 1930s there was a narrow-gauge industrial railway in Heraklion, from Giofyros in the west side of the city to the port. There are now no railway lines on Crete. The government is planning the construction of a line from Chania to Heraklion via Rethymno.

=== Development ===
The construction sector in Crete responded well during the pandemic and has come out strong in the post-recession recovery period. Total construction spending recovered and is expected to peak a record high (approximately 8% higher than 2019 average levels) signalling consistent expansion in construction projects and real estate investments in Crete. The evolution of the private sector in Crete is tightly linked with the demand for tourism-related investments. Moreover, the recovery of the tourism sector is expected to lead to further growth in housing prices and rental demand.

Newspapers have reported that the Ministry of Mercantile Marine is ready to support the agreement between Greece, South Korea, Dubai Ports World and China for the construction of a large international container port and free trade zone in southern Crete near Tympaki; the plan is to expropriate 850 ha (2,100 acres) of land. The port would handle two million containers per year, but the project has not been universally welcomed because of its environmental, economic and cultural impact. As of January 2013, the project has still not been confirmed, although there is mounting pressure to approve it, arising from Greece's difficult economic situation.

There are plans for underwater cables going from mainland Greece to Israel and Egypt passing by Crete and Cyprus: EuroAfrica Interconnector and EuroAsia Interconnector. They would connect Crete electrically with mainland Greece, ending energy isolation of Crete. At present Greece covers electricity cost differences for Crete of around €300 million per year.

== History ==
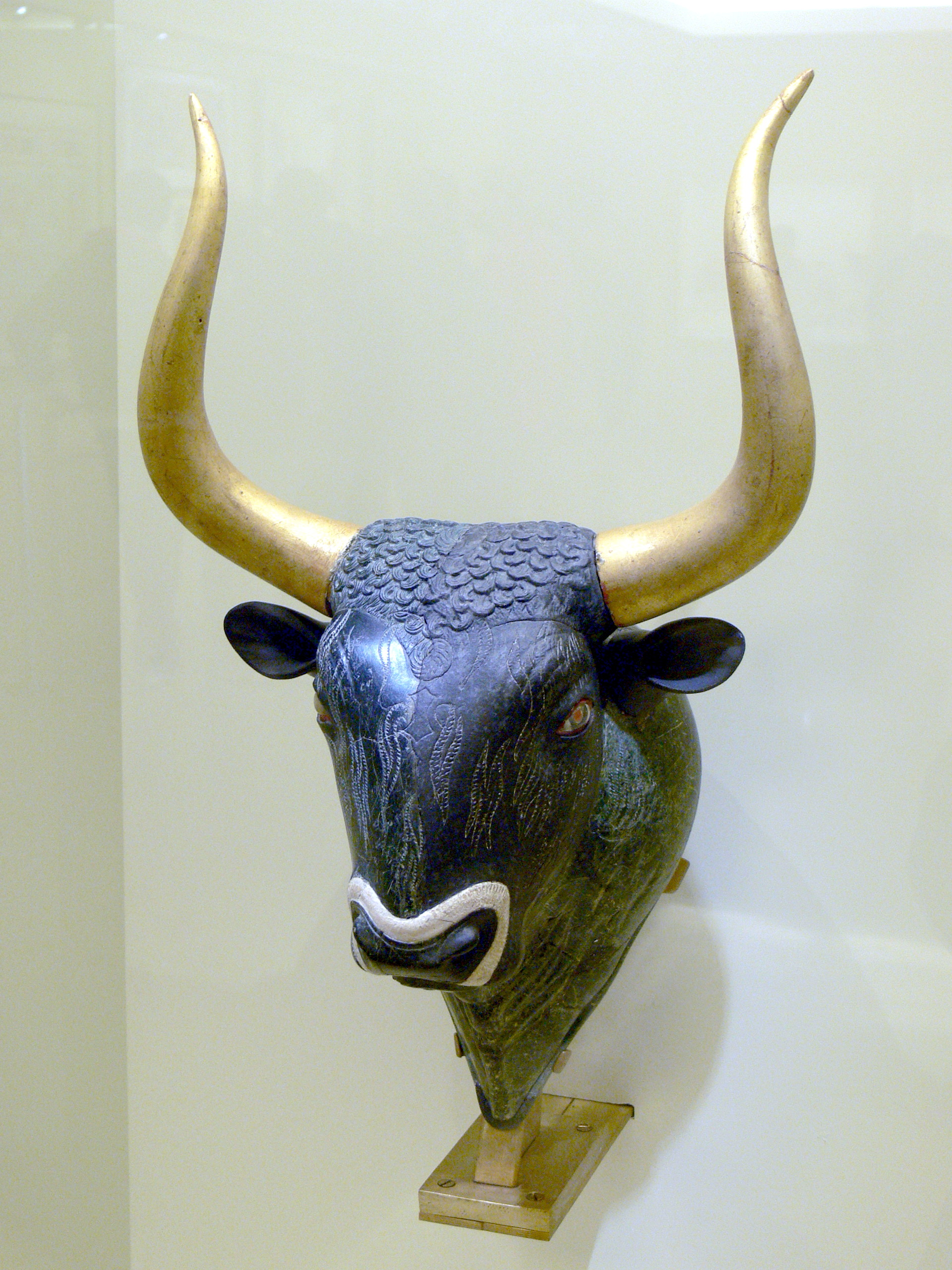
Minoan rhyton in the form of a bull, Heraklion Archaeological Museum

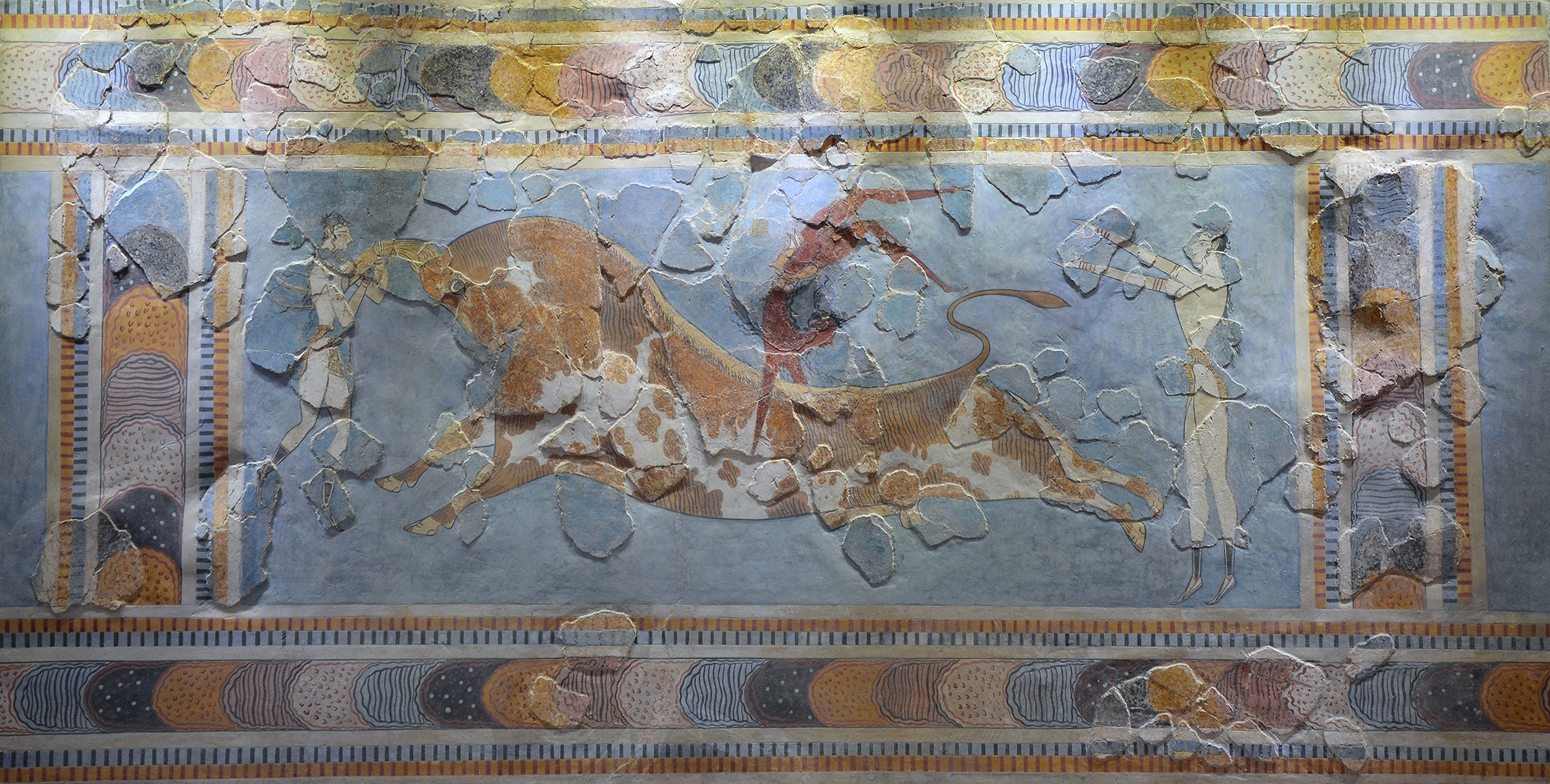
Minoan fresco from Knossos, Heraklion Archaeological Museum

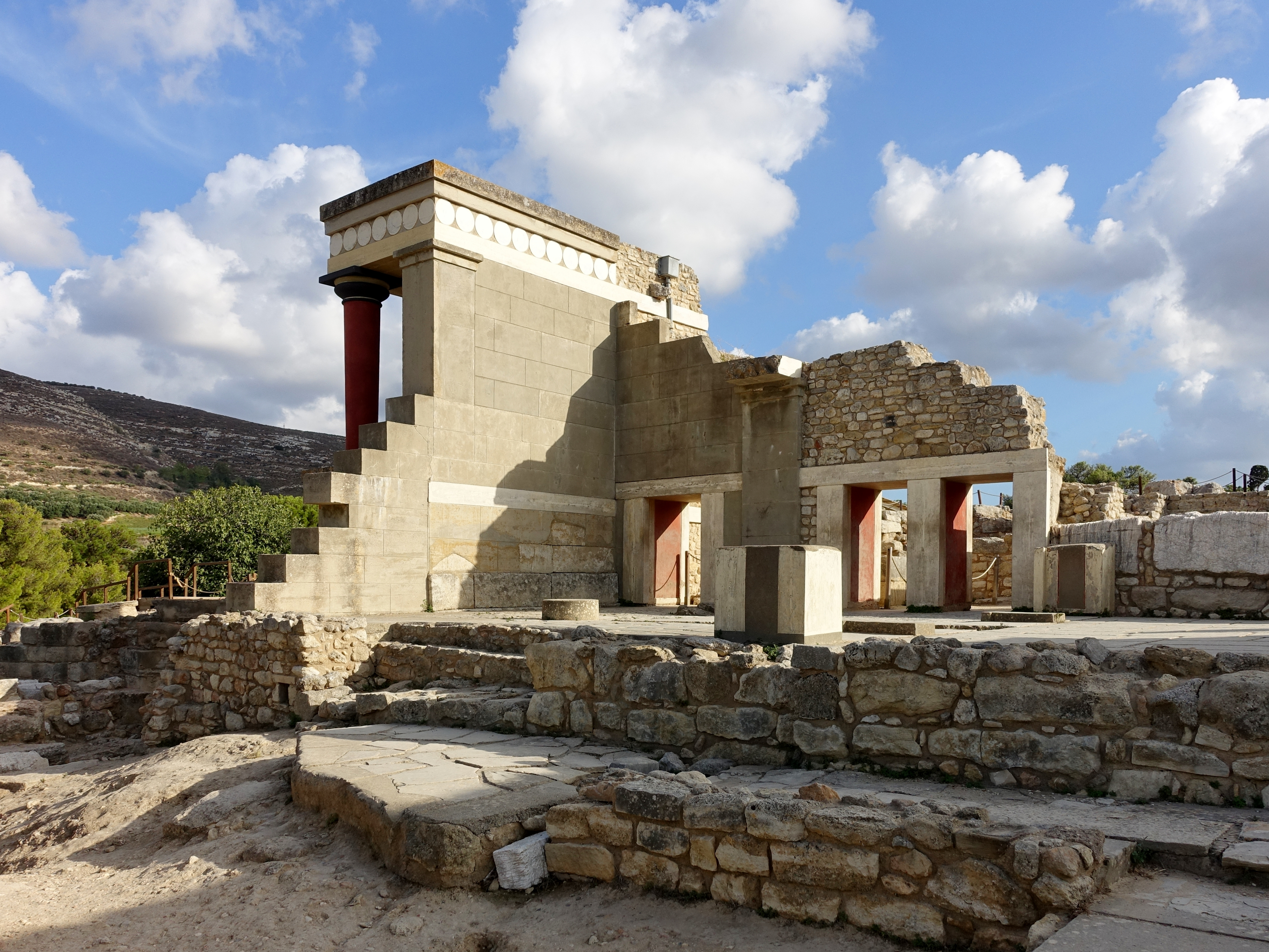
Minoan palace of Knossos

In the later Neolithic and Bronze Age periods, under the Minoans, Crete had a highly developed, literate civilization. It has been ruled by various ancient Greek entities, the Roman Empire, the Byzantine Empire, the Emirate of Crete, the Republic of Venice and the Ottoman Empire. After a brief period of independence (1897–1913) under a provisional Cretan government, it joined the Kingdom of Greece. It was occupied by Nazi Germany during the Second World War.

=== Prehistory ===
Stone tools suggest that archaic humans may have visited Crete as early as 130,000 years ago, but there is no evidence of permanent settlement of the island until the Neolithic, around 7,000 BCE. Settlements dating to the aceramic Neolithic in the 7th millennium BC, used cattle, sheep, goats, pigs and dogs as well as domesticated cereals and legumes; ancient Knossos was the site of one of these major Neolithic (then later Minoan) sites. Other neolithic settlements include those at Kephala, Magasa, Trapeza and Gortyn.

=== Minoan civilization ===
During the Bronze Age, Crete was the centre of the Minoan civilization, notable for its art, its writing systems such as Linear A, and for its massive building complexes including the palace at Knossos. Its economy benefited from a network of trade around much of the Mediterranean, and Minoan cultural influence extended to Cyprus, Canaan, and Egypt.

=== Mycenaean civilization ===
In 1420 BC, the Minoan civilization was subsumed by the Mycenaean civilization from mainland Greece. The oldest samples of writing in the Greek language, as identified by Michael Ventris, is the Linear B archive from Knossos, dated approximately to 1425–1375 BC.

=== Archaic and Classical period ===
After the Bronze Age collapse, Crete was settled by new waves of Greeks, mainly Dorians, from the mainland. A number of city states developed in the Archaic period. There was limited contact with mainland Greece, and Greek historiography shows little interest in Crete, so there are few literary references about the island or its people. Cretan archers were known for their skill and were employed as mercenaries in the armies of ancient Greece, including the army of Alexander the Great.

During the 6th to 4th centuries BC, Crete was comparatively free from warfare. The Gortyn code (5th century BC) is evidence for how codified civil law established a balance between aristocratic power and civil rights. In the late 4th century BC, the aristocratic order began to collapse due to endemic infighting among the elite, and Crete's economy was weakened by prolonged wars between city states.

=== Hellenistic period ===
During the 3rd century BC, Gortyn, Kydonia (Chania), Lyttos and Polyrrhenia challenged the primacy of ancient Knossos. While the cities continued to prey upon one another, they invited into their feuds mainland powers like Macedon and its rivals Rhodes and Ptolemaic Egypt. In 220 BC the island was tormented by a war between two opposing coalitions of cities. As a result, the Macedonian king Philip V gained hegemony over Crete which lasted to the end of the Cretan War (205–200 BC), when the Rhodians opposed the rise of Macedon and the Romans started to interfere in Cretan affairs. In the 2nd century BC Ierapytna (Ierapetra) gained supremacy on eastern Crete.

=== Roman rule ===
Crete was involved in the Mithridatic Wars, initially repelling an attack by Roman general Marcus Antonius Creticus in 71 BC. Nevertheless, a ferocious three-year campaign soon followed under Quintus Caecilius Metellus, equipped with three legions. Crete was conquered by Rome in 69 BC, earning for Metellus the title "Creticus". Gortyn was made capital of the island, and Crete became a Roman province, along with Cyrenaica that was called Creta et Cyrenaica. Archaeological remains suggest that Crete under Roman rule witnessed prosperity and increased connectivity with other parts of the Empire. In the 2nd century AD, at least three cities in Crete (Lyttos, Gortyn, Hierapytna) joined the Panhellenion, a league of Greek cities founded by the emperor Hadrian. When Diocletian redivided the Empire, Crete was placed, along with Cyrene, under the diocese of Moesia, and later by Constantine I to the diocese of Macedonia.

=== Byzantine Empire – first period ===
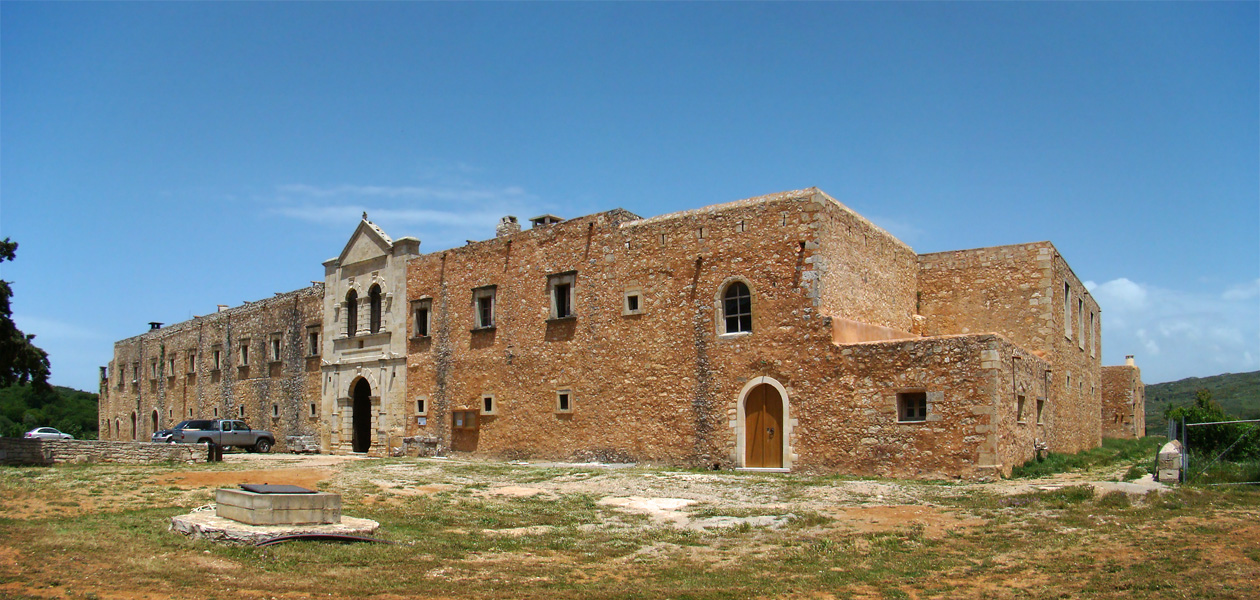
Arkadi Monastery

Crete was separated from Cyrenaica c. 297. It remained a province within the eastern half of the Roman Empire, usually referred to as the Eastern Roman (Byzantine) Empire after the establishment of a second capital in Constantinople by Constantine in 330. Crete was subjected to an attack by Vandals in 467, the great earthquakes of 365 and 415, a raid by Slavs in 623, Arab raids in 654 and the 670s, and again in the 8th century. In c. 732, the Emperor Leo III the Isaurian transferred the island from the jurisdiction of the Pope to that of the Patriarchate of Constantinople.

=== Arab rule ===
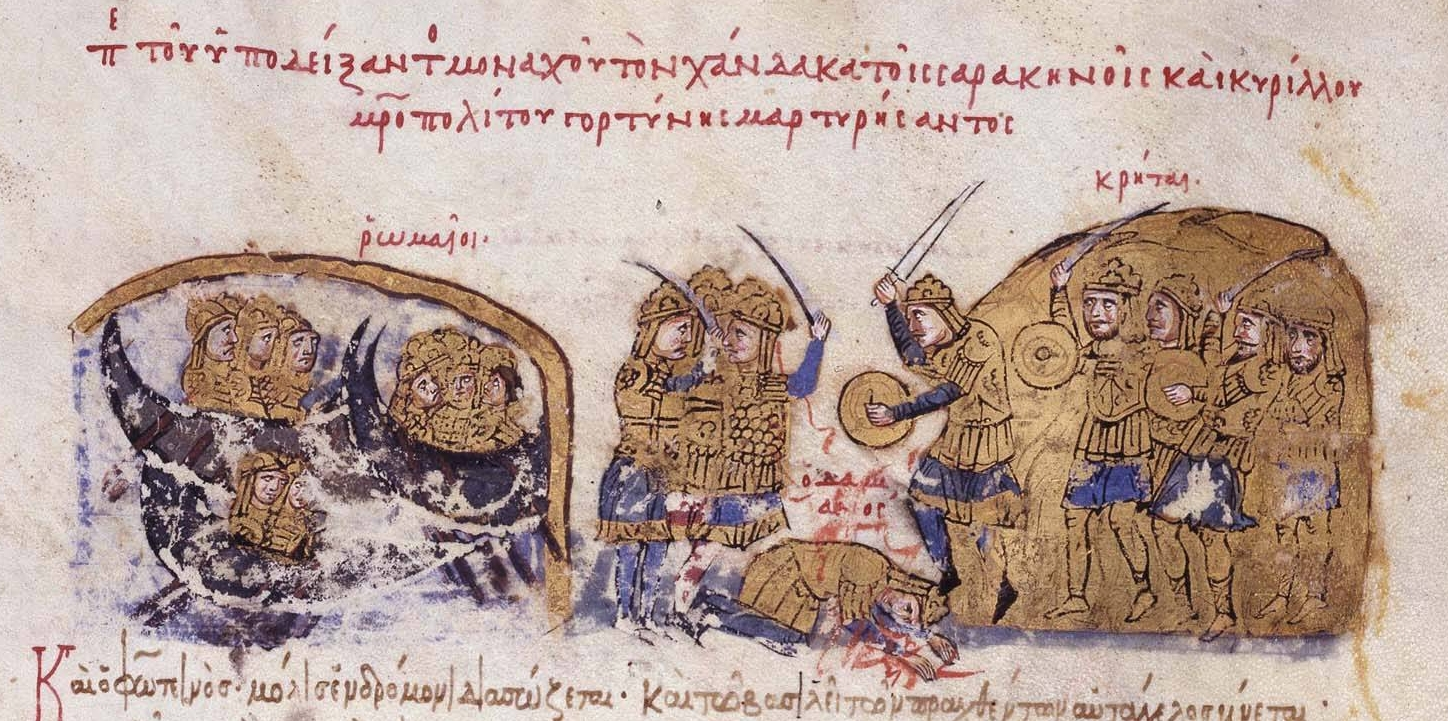
The Byzantines, under the general Damian, attacked Crete but were defeated by the Saracens, c. 828, as depicted by Ioannes Scylitzes (see Skylitzes Chronicle).

In the 820s, after 900 years as a Roman island, Crete was captured by Andalusian Muwallads led by Abu Hafs, who established the Emirate of Crete. The Byzantines launched a campaign that took most of the island back in 842 and 843 under Theoktistos. Further Byzantine campaigns in 911 and 949 failed. In 960–61, Nikephoros Phokas' campaign restored Crete to the Byzantine Empire, after a century and a half of Arab control. Muslim inhabitants were either killed or carried off into slavery, while the island's last emir Abd al-Aziz ibn Shu'ayb (Kouroupas) and his son al-Numan (Anemas) were taken captive and brought to Constantinople, where Phokas celebrated a triumph. The island was converted into a Byzantine theme, and the remaining Muslims were converted to Christianity by missionaries like Nikon "the Metanoeite".

=== Byzantine Empire – second period ===
In 961, Nikephoros Phokas returned the island to Byzantine rule after expelling the Arabs. Extensive efforts at conversion of the populace were undertaken, led by John Xenos and Nikon "the Metanoeite". The reconquest of Crete was a major achievement for the Byzantines, as it restored Byzantine control over the Aegean littoral and diminished the threat of Saracen pirates, for which Crete had provided a base of operations.

In 1204, the Fourth Crusade seized and sacked the imperial capital of Constantinople. Crete was initially granted to leading Crusader Boniface of Montferrat in the partition of spoils that followed. However, Boniface sold his claim to the Republic of Venice, whose forces made up the majority of the Crusade. Venice's rival the Republic of Genoa immediately seized the island and it was not until 1212 that Venice secured Crete as a colony.

=== Venetian rule ===
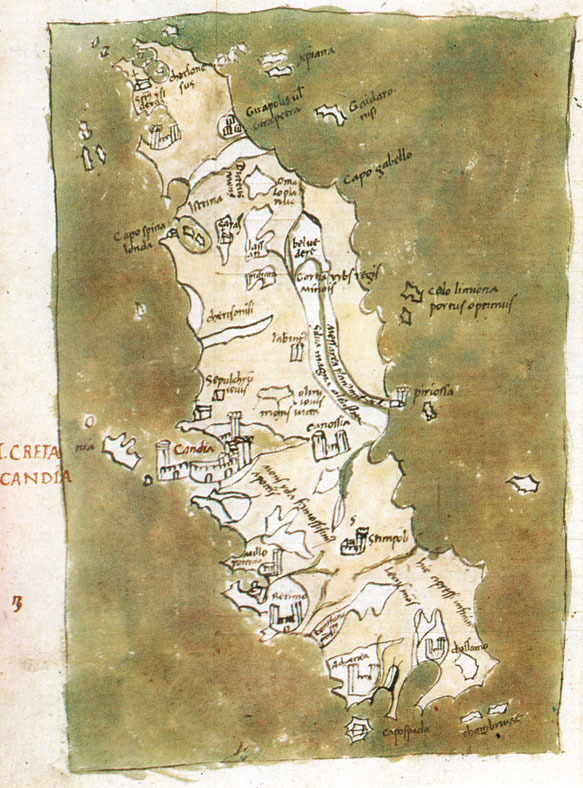
15th-century map by Buondelmonti

From 1212, during Venice's rule, which lasted more than four centuries, a Renaissance swept through the island as is evident from the artistic works dating to that period. Known as The Cretan School or Post-Byzantine Art, it is among the last flowerings of the artistic traditions of the fallen empire. This included the painter El Greco and the writers Nicholas Kalliakis (1645–1707), Georgios Kalafatis (professor) (c. 1652–1720), Andreas Musalus (c. 1665–1721) and Vitsentzos Kornaros.

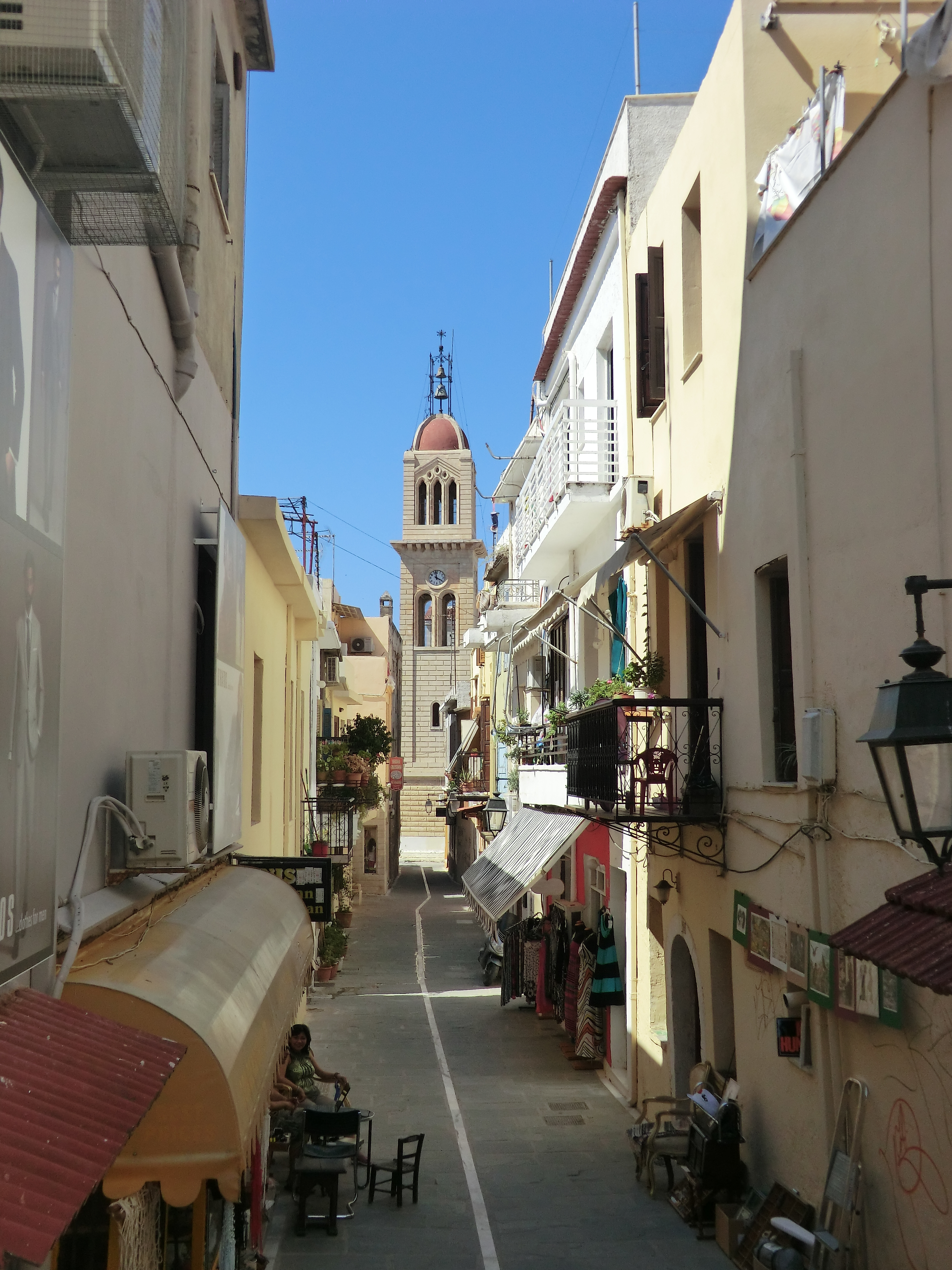
View of the Old Venetian Town of Rethymno

In total, about 10,000 Venetians are estimated to have moved to Crete during the first century of Venetian rule—by comparison, Venice itself had a population of c. 60,000 at this period. The colonization wave of 1252 also resulted in the establishment of Canea (modern Chania), on the site of the long abandoned ancient city of Kydonia.

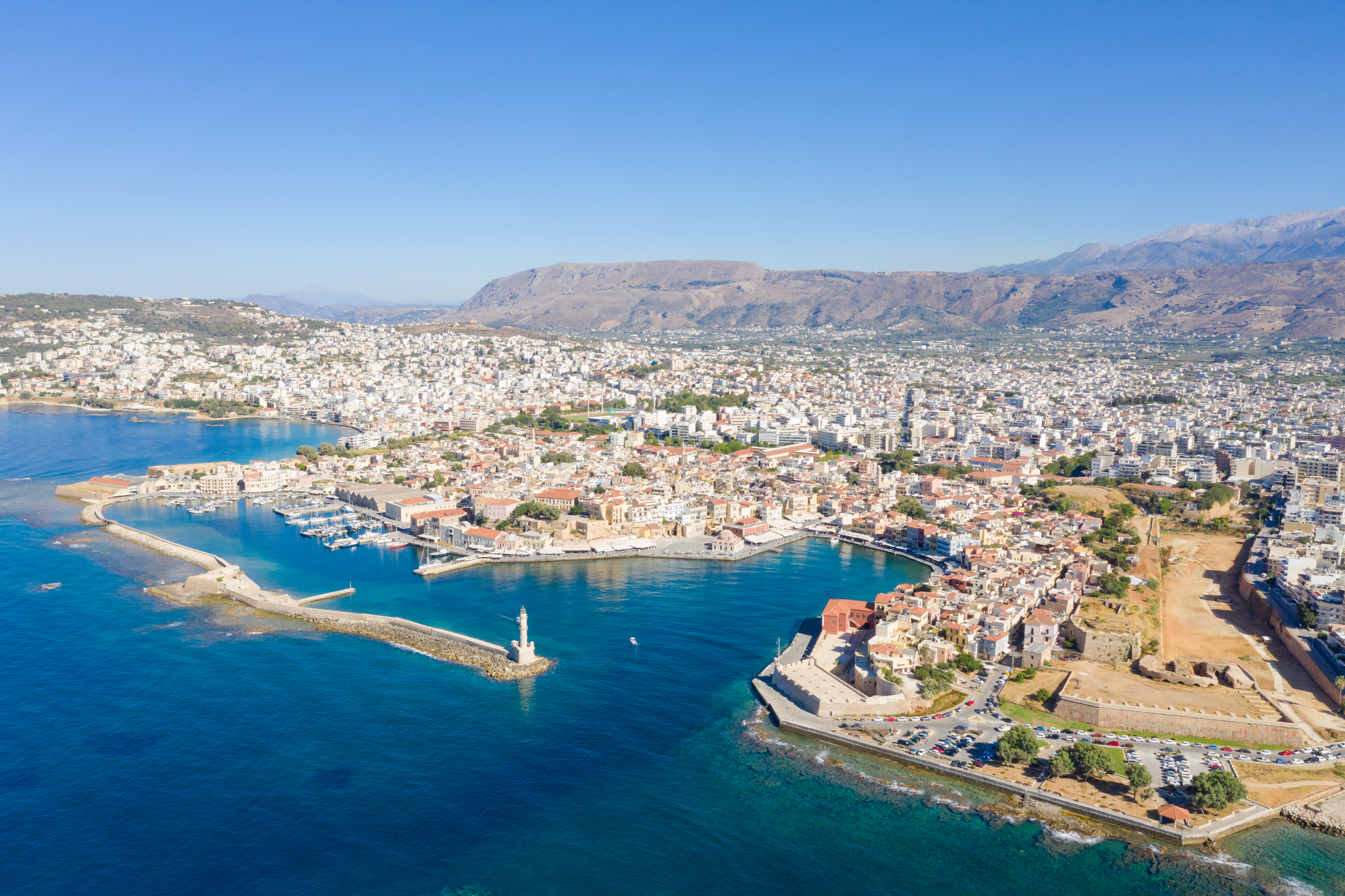
View of the Old Venetian Harbour of Chania

Under the rule of the Catholic Venetians, the city of Candia (modern Heraklion) was reputed to be the best fortified city of the Eastern Mediterranean. The three main forts were located at Gramvousa, Spinalonga, and Fortezza at Rethymnon. Other fortifications include the Kazarma fortress at Sitia and Frangokastello in Sfakia.

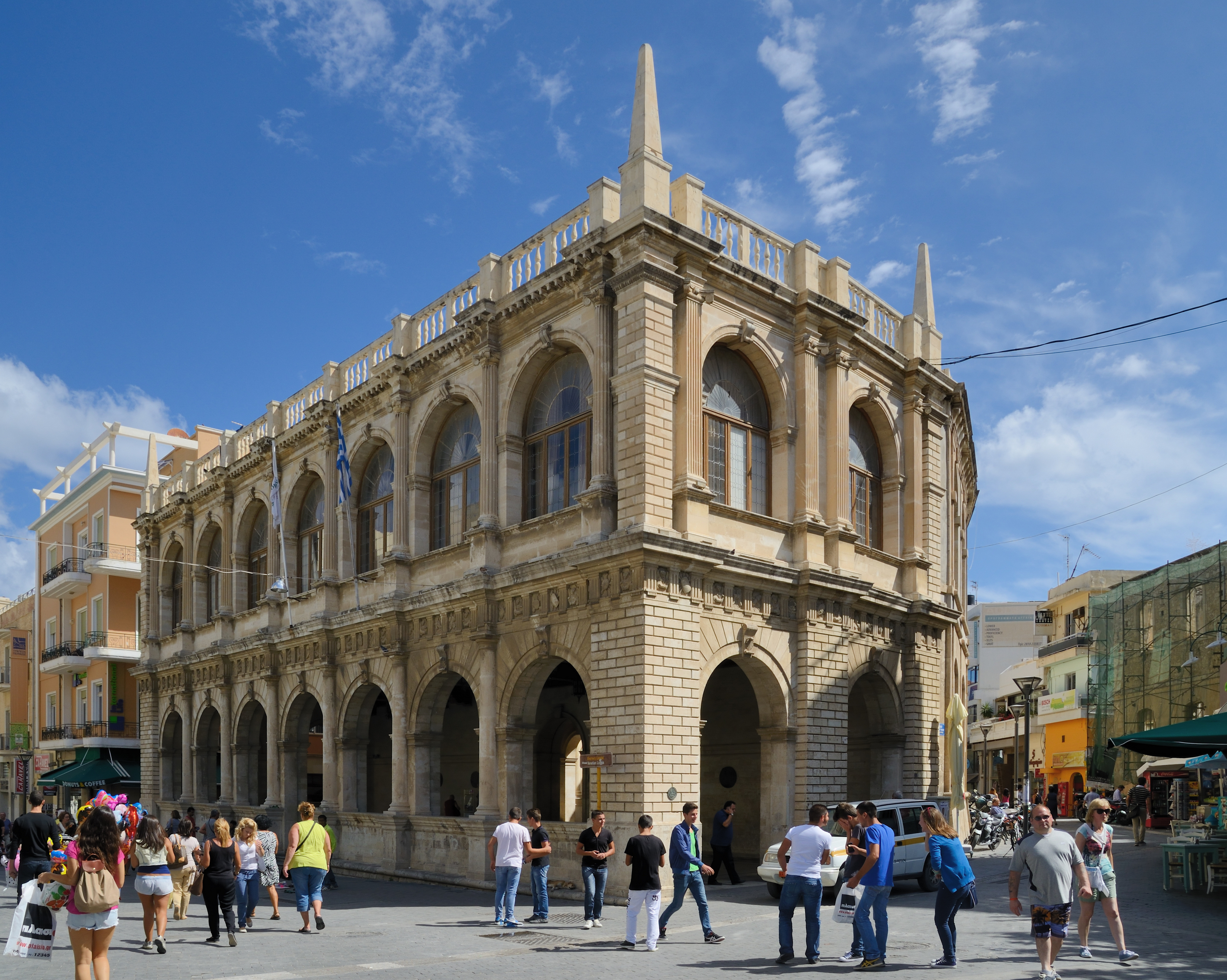
Venetian Loggia, Heraklion

In 1492, Jews expelled from Spain settled on the island. In 1574–77, Crete was under the rule of Giacomo Foscarini as Proveditor General, Sindace and Inquisitor. According to Starr's 1942 article, the rule of Giacomo Foscarini was a Dark Age for Jews and Greeks. Under his rule, non-Catholics had to pay high taxes with no allowances. In 1627, there were 800 Jews in the city of Candia, about seven percent of the city's population. Marco Foscarini was the Doge of Venice during this time.

=== Ottoman rule ===
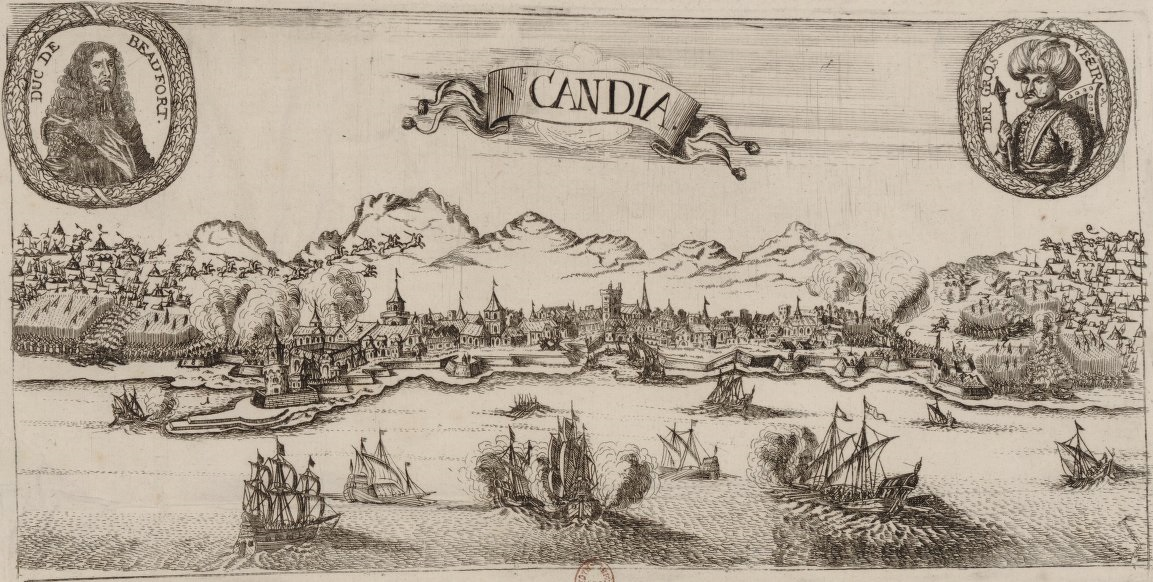
The Siege of Candia, regarded as one of the longest sieges in history, lasted from 1648 to 1669.

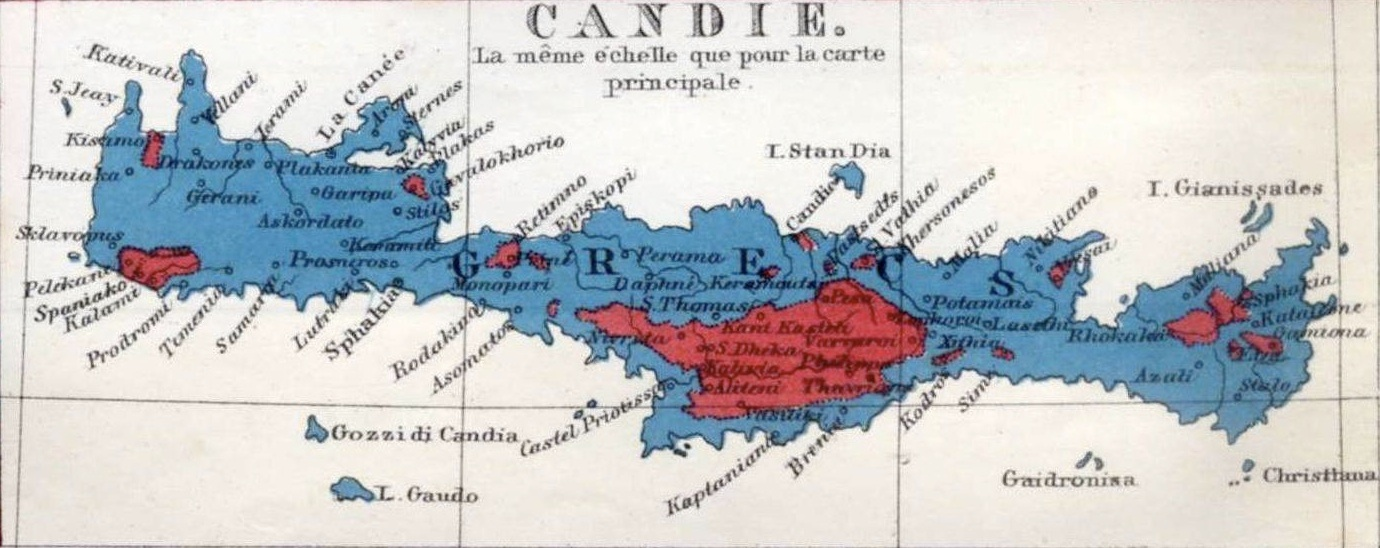
Ethnic makeup of the island in 1861 Greek Orthodox Cretan Muslim/Turkish

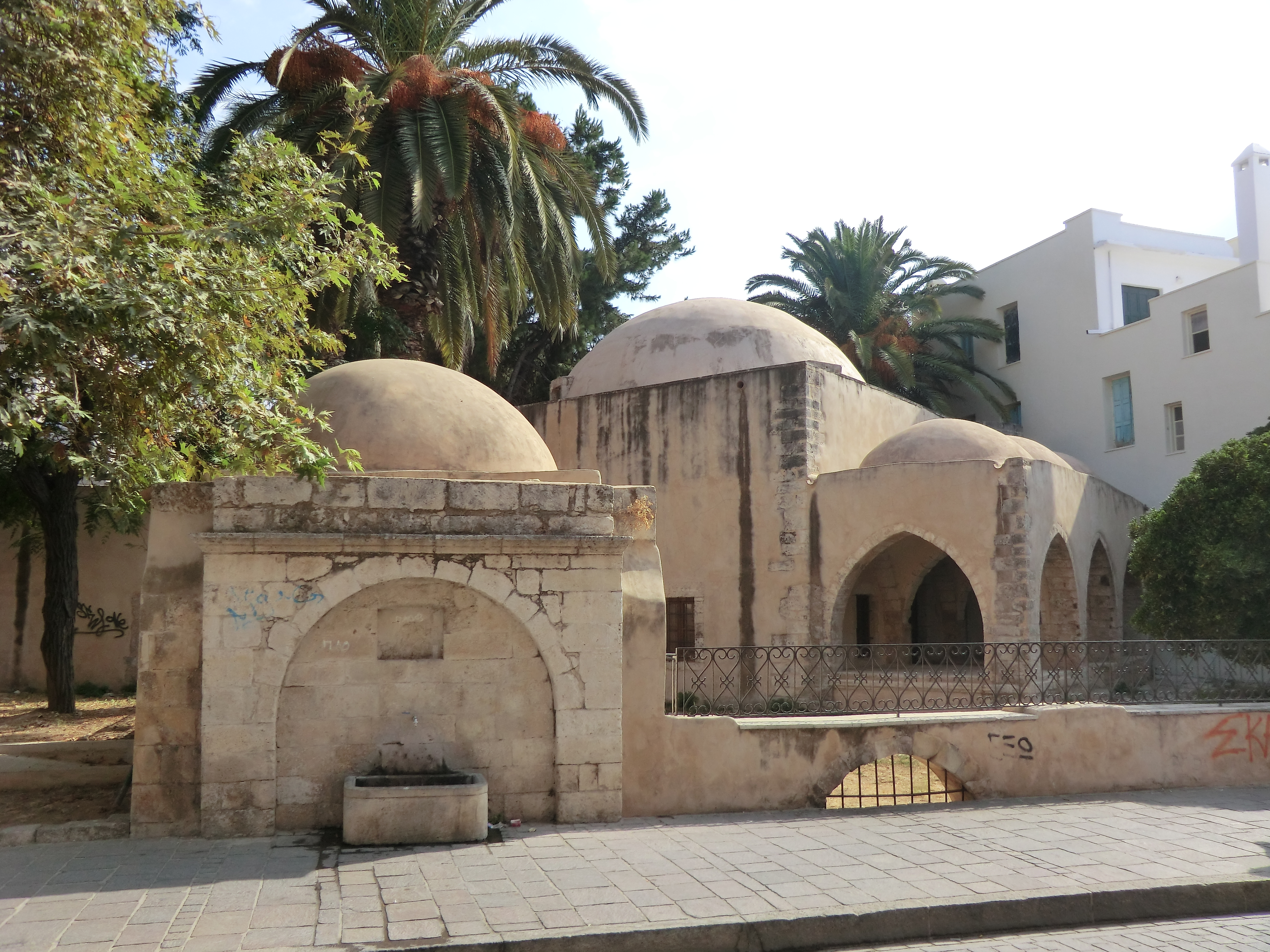
Kara Musa Pasha mosque, Rethymno

The Ottomans conquered Crete (Girit Eyâleti) in 1669, after the siege of Candia with the last Venetian strongholds off Crete falling in the last Ottoman–Venetian War in 1715. Many Greek Cretans fled to other regions of the Republic of Venice after the Ottoman–Venetian Wars, some even prospering such as the family of Simone Stratigo (c. 1733 – c. 1824) who migrated to Dalmatia from Crete in 1669.

Heraklion was surrounded by high walls and bastions and extended westward and southward by the 17th century. The most opulent area of the city was the northeastern quadrant where the elite were gathered. The city had received another name under the rule of the Ottomans, "the deserted city" following its destruction after the Siege of Candia.

Islamic presence on the island, aside from the interlude of the Arab occupation, was cemented by the Ottoman conquest. Most Cretan Muslims were local Greek converts who spoke Cretan Greek, but in the island's 19th-century political context they came to be viewed by the Christian population as Turks. Contemporary estimates vary, but in 1830, as much as 45% of the population of the island may have been Muslim.

During the Russo-Turkish War (1768–1774), a revolt against Ottoman rule in Crete was started by Daskalogiannis, a shipowner from Sfakia who was promised support by the Russian navy which never arrived. Daskalogiannis eventually surrendered to the Ottoman authorities. On 17 June 1771 Daskalogiannis was, in the full daylight of publicity, tortured, skinned alive and then beaten to death, an ordeal that he endured in complete silence. Today, Chania International Airport is named after him.

During the Greek War of Independence, Sultan Mahmud II granted rule over Crete to Egypt's de facto ruler Muhammad Ali Pasha in exchange for his military support. Crete was subsequently left out of the new Greek state established under the London Protocol of 1830. Its administration by Muhammad Ali was confirmed in the Convention of Kütahya of 1833, but direct Ottoman rule was re-established by the Convention of London of 3 July 1840.

The Cretan Revolt of 1866–1869 or Great Cretan Revolution (Greek: Κρητική Επανάσταση του 1866) was a three-year uprising against Ottoman rule, the third and largest in a series of revolts between the end of the Greek War of Independence in 1830 and the establishment of the independent Cretan State in 1898. A particular event which caused strong reactions among the liberal circles of western Europe was the Holocaust of Arkadi. The event occurred in November 1866, as a large Ottoman force besieged the Arkadi Monastery, which served as the headquarters of the rebellion.

In addition to its 259 defenders, over 700 women and children had taken refuge in the monastery. After a few days of hard fighting, the Ottomans broke into the monastery. At that point, under orders from the hegumen (abbot) of the monastery, the Cretans blew up barrels of gunpowder, choosing to sacrifice themselves rather than surrender. The subsequent explosion resulted the death of most of the rebels and the women and children sheltered there. Thirty-six insurgents had found refuge in the refectory, near the ammunitions. Discovered by the Ottomans, who forced the door, they were massacred.

=== Cretan State and union with Greece ===
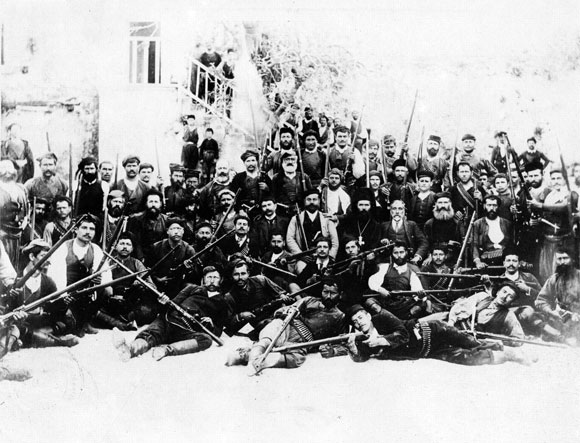
Revolutionaries at Theriso

Following the repeated uprisings in 1841, 1858, 1889, 1895 and 1897 by the Cretan people, who wanted to join Greece, the Great Powers decided to restore order and in February 1897 sent in troops. The island was subsequently garrisoned by troops from Great Britain, France, Italy and Russia; Germany and Austro-Hungary withdrawing from the occupation in early 1898. During this period Crete was governed through a committee of admirals from the remaining four Powers. In March 1898 the Powers decreed, with the reluctant consent of the Sultan, that the island would be granted autonomy under Ottoman suzerainty in the near future.

In September 1898 the Candia massacre in Candia, modern Heraklion, left over 500 Cretan Christians and 14 British servicemen dead at the hands of Muslim irregulars. As a result, the Admirals ordered the expulsion of all Ottoman troops and administrators from the island, a move that was ultimately completed by early November. The decision to grant autonomy to the island was enforced and a High Commissioner, Prince George of Greece, appointed, arriving to take up his post in December 1898. The flag of the Cretan State was chosen by the Powers, with the white star representing the Ottoman suzerainty over the island.

Flag of Cretan State

In 1905, disagreements between Prince George and minister Eleftherios Venizelos over the question of the enosis (union with Greece), such as the Prince's autocratic style of government, resulted in the Theriso revolt, one of the leaders being Eleftherios Venizelos. Prince George resigned as High Commissioner and was replaced by Alexandros Zaimis, a former Greek prime minister, in 1906. In 1908, taking advantage of domestic turmoil in Turkey as well as the timing of Zaimis's vacation away from the island, the Cretan deputies unilaterally declared union with Greece. With the outbreak of the First Balkan War, the Greek government declared that Crete was now Greek territory. This was not recognised internationally until 1 December 1913.

=== Second World War ===
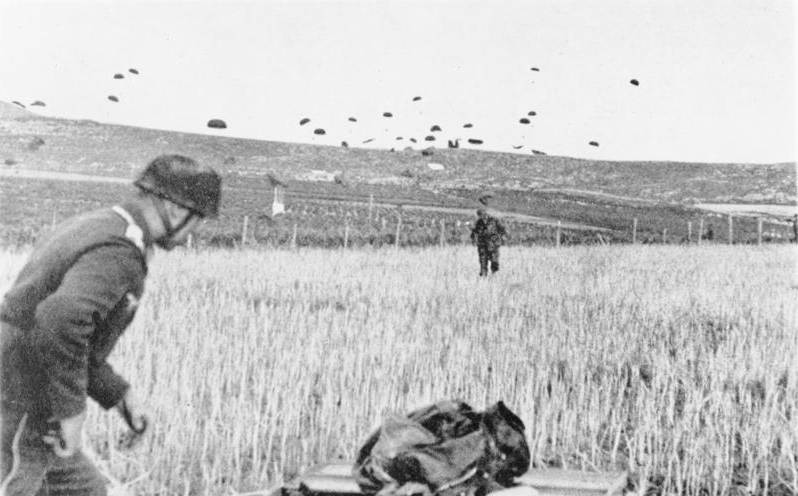
German paratroopers landing on Crete during the Battle of Crete

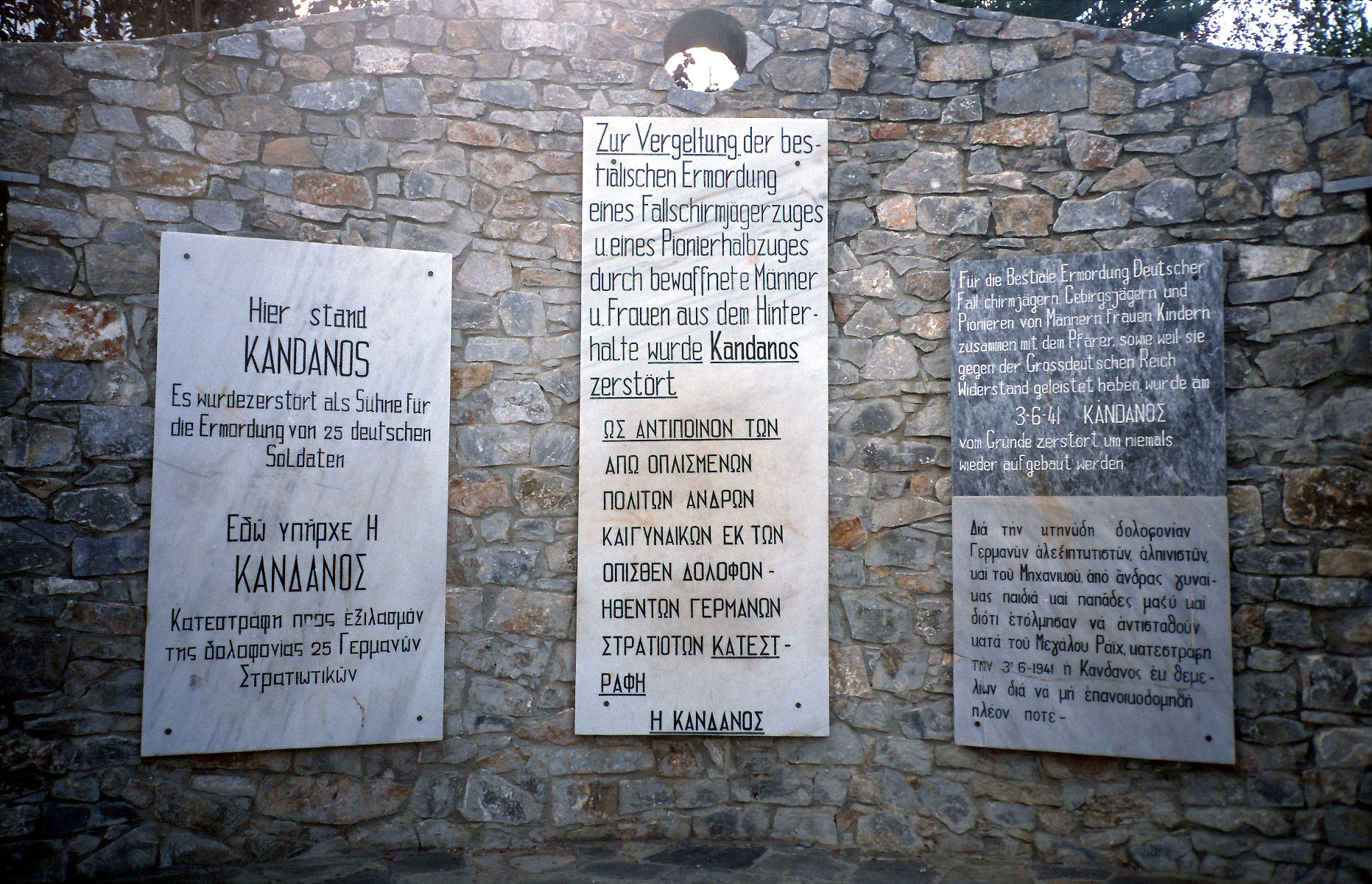
War memorial in Kandanos

During World War II, the island was the scene of the Battle of Crete in May 1941. The initial 11-day battle was bloody and left more than 11,000 soldiers and civilians killed or wounded. As a result of the fierce resistance from both Allied forces and civilian Cretan locals, the invasion force suffered heavy casualties, and Adolf Hitler forbade further large-scale paratroop operations for the rest of the war.

During the initial and subsequent occupation, German firing squads routinely executed male civilians in reprisal for the death of German soldiers; civilians were rounded up randomly in local villages for the mass killings, such as at the Massacre of Kondomari and the Viannos massacres. Two German generals were later tried and executed for their roles in the killing of 3,000 of the island's inhabitants.

Following the collapse of fronts elsewhere in Europe, German forces evacuated most of Crete in October 1944 leaving an area including Chania under occupation. The following year the day after VE Day the remaining Germans under Generalmajor Hans-Georg Benthack surrendered at Knossos to British Major-General Colin Callander, refusing to surrender to the Greek army, for fear of retaliations.

=== Civil War ===
In the aftermath of the Dekemvriana in Athens, Cretan leftists were targeted by the right-wing paramilitary organization National Organization of Rethymno (EOR), which engaged in attacks in the villages of Koxare and Melampes, as well as Rethymno in January 1945. Those attacks did not escalate into a full-scale insurgency as they did in the Greek mainland and the Cretan ELAS did not surrender its weapons after the Treaty of Varkiza. An uneasy truce was maintained until 1947, with a series of arrests of notable communists in Chania and Heraklion. Encouraged by orders from the central organization in Athens, KKE launched an insurgency in Crete; marking the beginning of the Greek Civil War on the island. In eastern Crete the Democratic Army of Greece (DSE) struggled to establish its presence in Dikti and Psilorites. On 1 July 1947, the surviving 55 fighters of DSE were ambushed south of Psilorites, the few surviving members of the unit managed to join the rest of DSE in Lefka Ori.

The Lefka Ori region in the west offered more favourable conditions for DSE's insurgency. In the summer of 1947 DSE raided and looted the Maleme Airport and motor depot at Chrysopigi. Its numbers swelled to approximately 300 fighters. The rise of DSE numbers compounded with crop failure on the island created serious logistical issues for the insurgents. The communists resorted to cattle rustling and crop confiscations which solved the problem only temporarily. In the autumn of 1947, the Greek government offered generous amnesty terms to Cretan DSE fighters and mountain bandits, many of whom opted to abandon armed struggle or defect to the nationalists. On 4 July 1948, government troops launched a large scale offensive on Samariá Gorge. Many DSE soldiers were killed in the fighting while the survivors broke into small armed bands. In October 1948, the secretary of the Cretan KKE Giorgos Tsitilos was killed in an ambush. By the following month only 34 DSE fighters remained active in Lefka Ori. The insurgency in Crete gradually withered away, with the last two hold outs surrendering in 1974, 25 years after the conclusion of the war in mainland Greece.

== Tourism ==
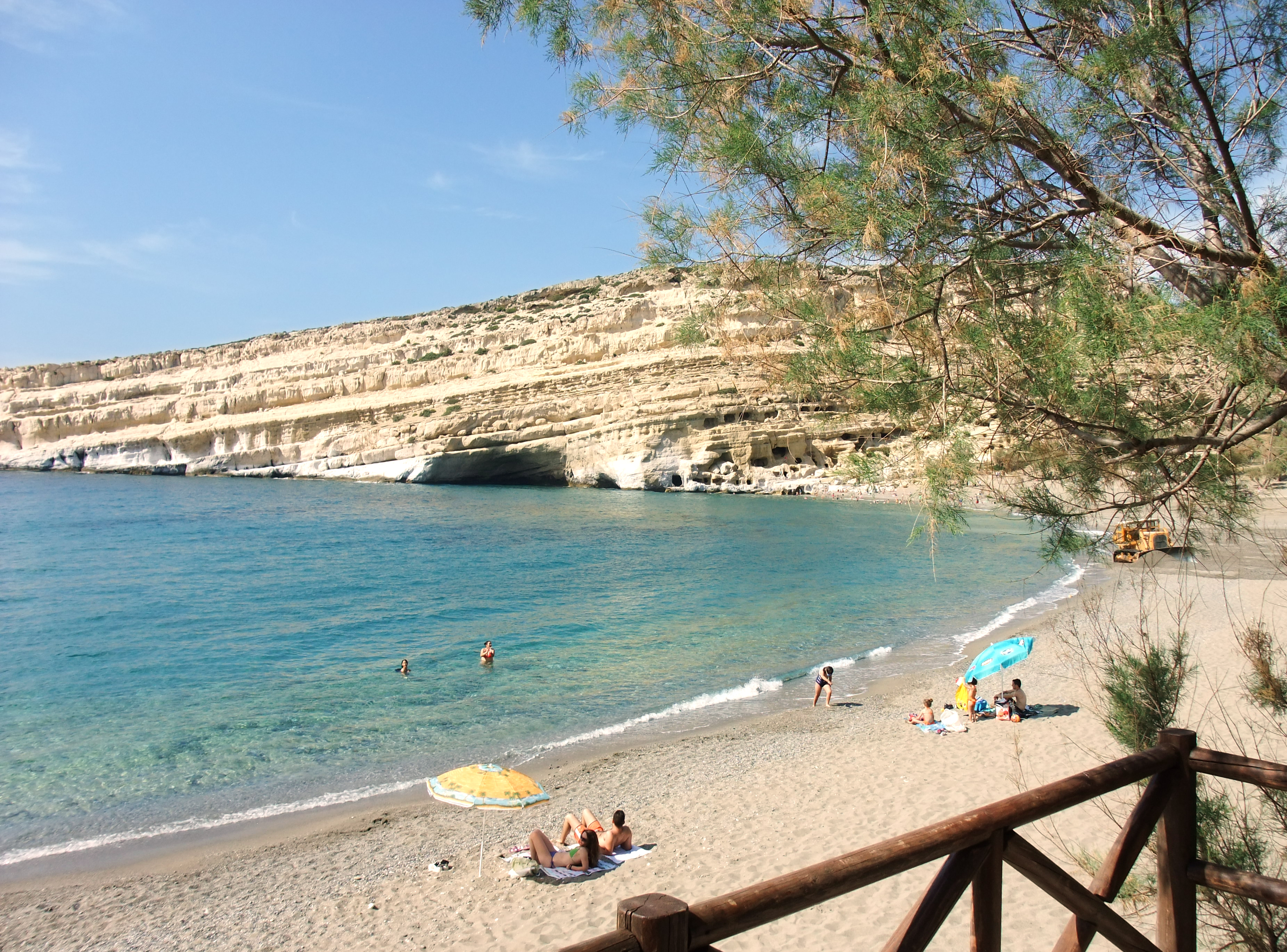
Matala beach

Crete is one of the most popular holiday destinations in Greece. In 2023, Crete welcomed 6.3 million visitors, who stayed on average 5.4 days on the island, reflecting significant overtourism pressure on coastal infrastructure. 15% of all arrivals in Greece come through the city of Heraklion (port and airport), while charter journeys to Heraklion make up about 20% of all charter flights in Greece. The number of hotel beds on the island increased by 53% in the period between 1986 and 1991.

Today, the island's tourism infrastructure includes a wide range of accommodation; including large luxury hotels with their complete facilities, swimming pools, sports and recreation, smaller family-owned apartments, camping facilities and others. Visitors reach the island via two international airports in Heraklion and Chania and a smaller airport in Sitia (international charter and domestic flights started in May 2012) or by boat to the main ports of Heraklion, Chania, Rethimno, Agios Nikolaos and Sitia.

Popular tourist attractions include the archaeological sites of the Minoan civilisation, the Venetian old city and port of Chania, the Venetian castle at Rethymno, the gorge of Samaria, the islands of Chrysi, Elafonisi, Gramvousa, Spinalonga and the Palm Beach of Vai, which is the largest natural palm forest in Europe.

=== Transportation ===
Crete has an extensive bus system with regular services across the north of the island and from north to south. There are two regional bus stations in Heraklion. Bus routes and timetables can be found on KTEL website.

=== Holiday homes and immigration ===
Crete's mild climate attracts northern Europeans who want a holiday home or residence on the island. EU citizens have the right to freely buy property and reside with little formality. In the cities of Heraklion and Chania, the average price per square metre of apartments ranges from €1,670 to €1,700. A growing number of real estate companies cater mainly to British immigrants, followed by Dutch, German, Scandinavian and other European nationalities wishing to own a home in Crete. The British immigrants are concentrated in the western regional units of Chania and Rethymno and to a lesser extent in Heraklion and Lasithi.

=== Archaeological sites and museums ===
The area has a large number of archaeological sites, including the Minoan sites of Knossos, Malia (not to be confused with the town of the same name), Zakros, Petras and Phaistos, the classical site of Gortys, and the diverse archaeology of the island of Koufonisi, which includes Minoan, Roman, and World War II era ruins (nb. due to conservation concerns, access to Koufonisi has been restricted for the last few years).

There are museums throughout Crete, most notably the Heraklion Archaeological Museum which displays most of the archaeological finds from the Minoan era. Other notable museums in the Chania Regional Unit include the Maritime Museum of Crete, the Archaeological Museum of Chania, the Residence Museum Venizelos and the WW2 museum in Platanias.

=== Harmful effects ===
Helen Briassoulis, in a qualitative analysis, proposed in the Journal of Sustainable Tourism that Crete is affected by tourism applying pressure to it to develop at an unhealthy rate, and that informal, internal systems within the country are forced to adapt. According to her, these forces have strengthened in three stages: from the period from 1960 to 1970, 1970–1990, and 1990 to the present. During this first period, tourism was a largely positive force, pushing modern developments like running water and electricity onto the largely rural countryside. However, beginning in the second period and especially in the third period leading up to the present day, tourist companies became more pushy with deforestation and pollution of Crete's natural resources. The country is then pulled into an interesting parity, where these companies only upkeep those natural resources that are directly essential to their industry.

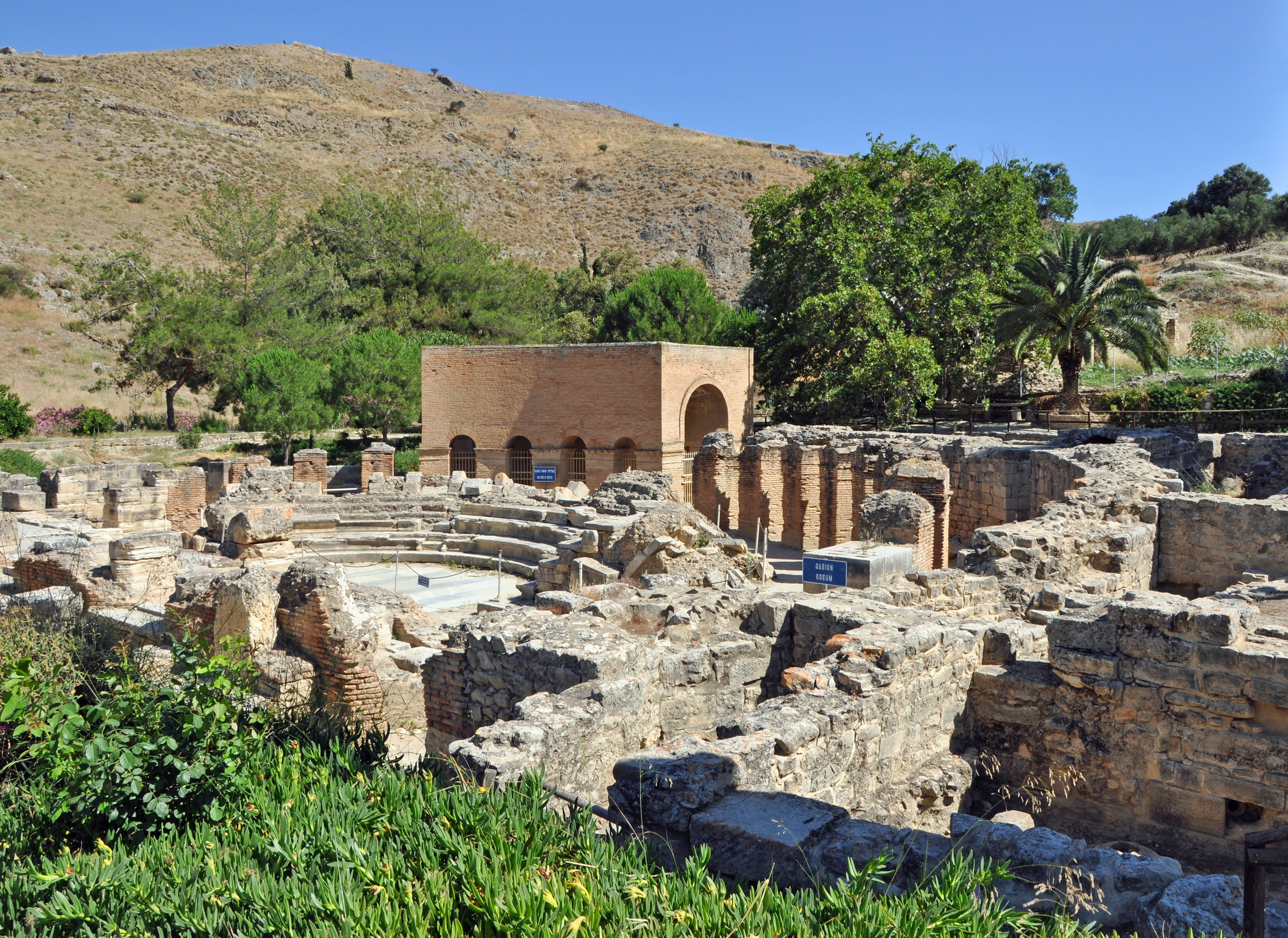
View of Gortyn

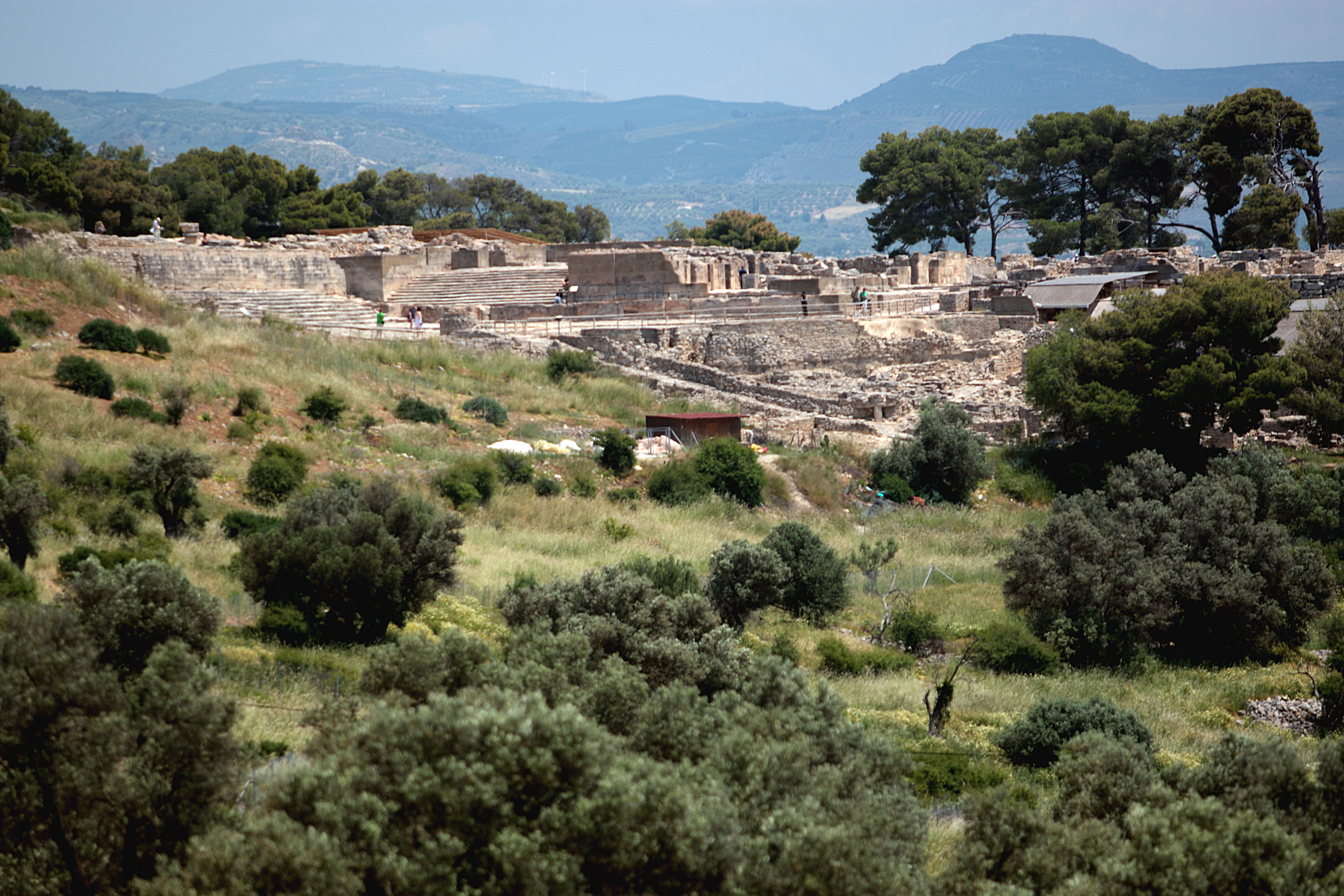
Archaeological site of Phaistos

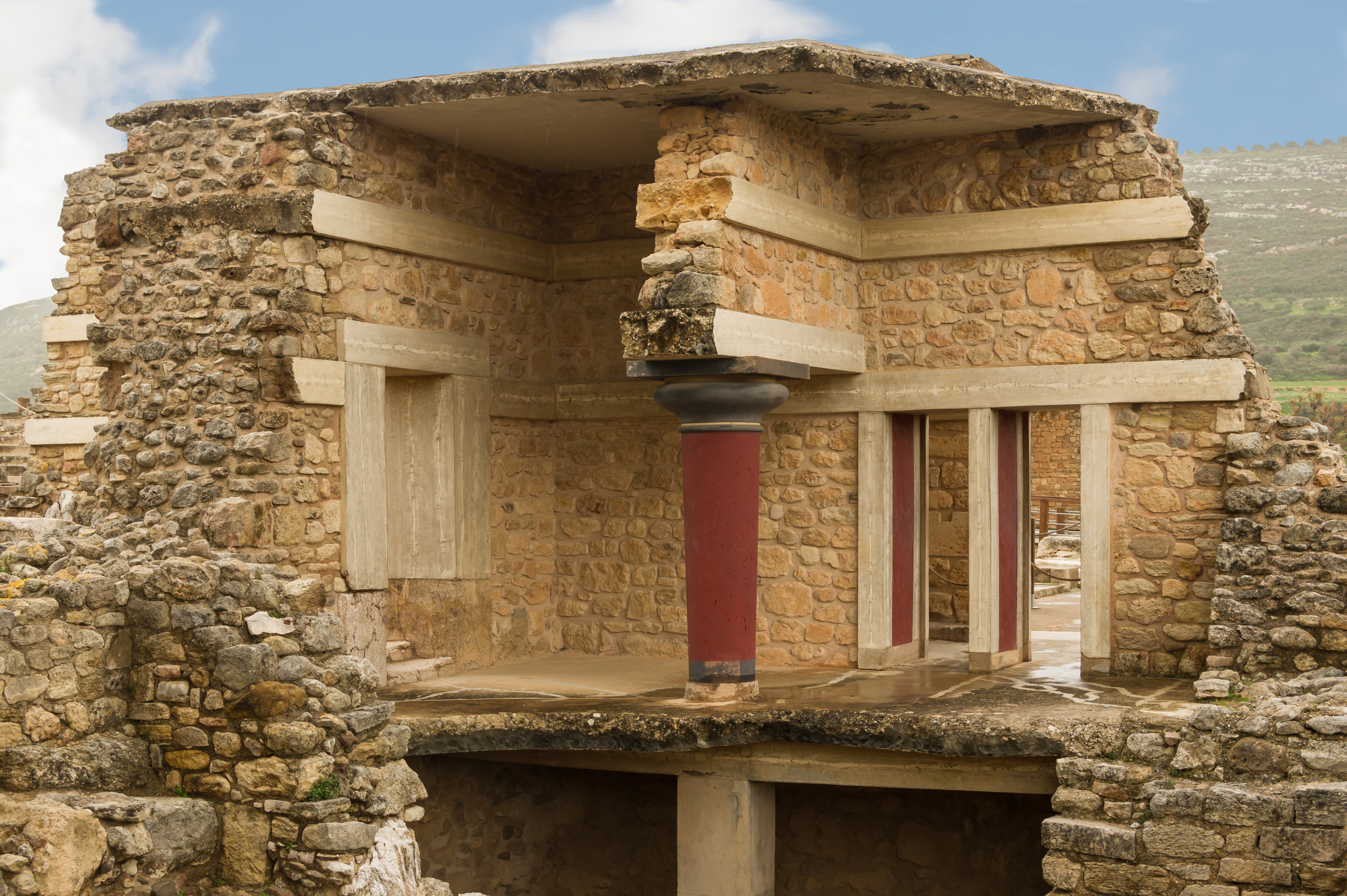
Ruins of the Palace of Knossos

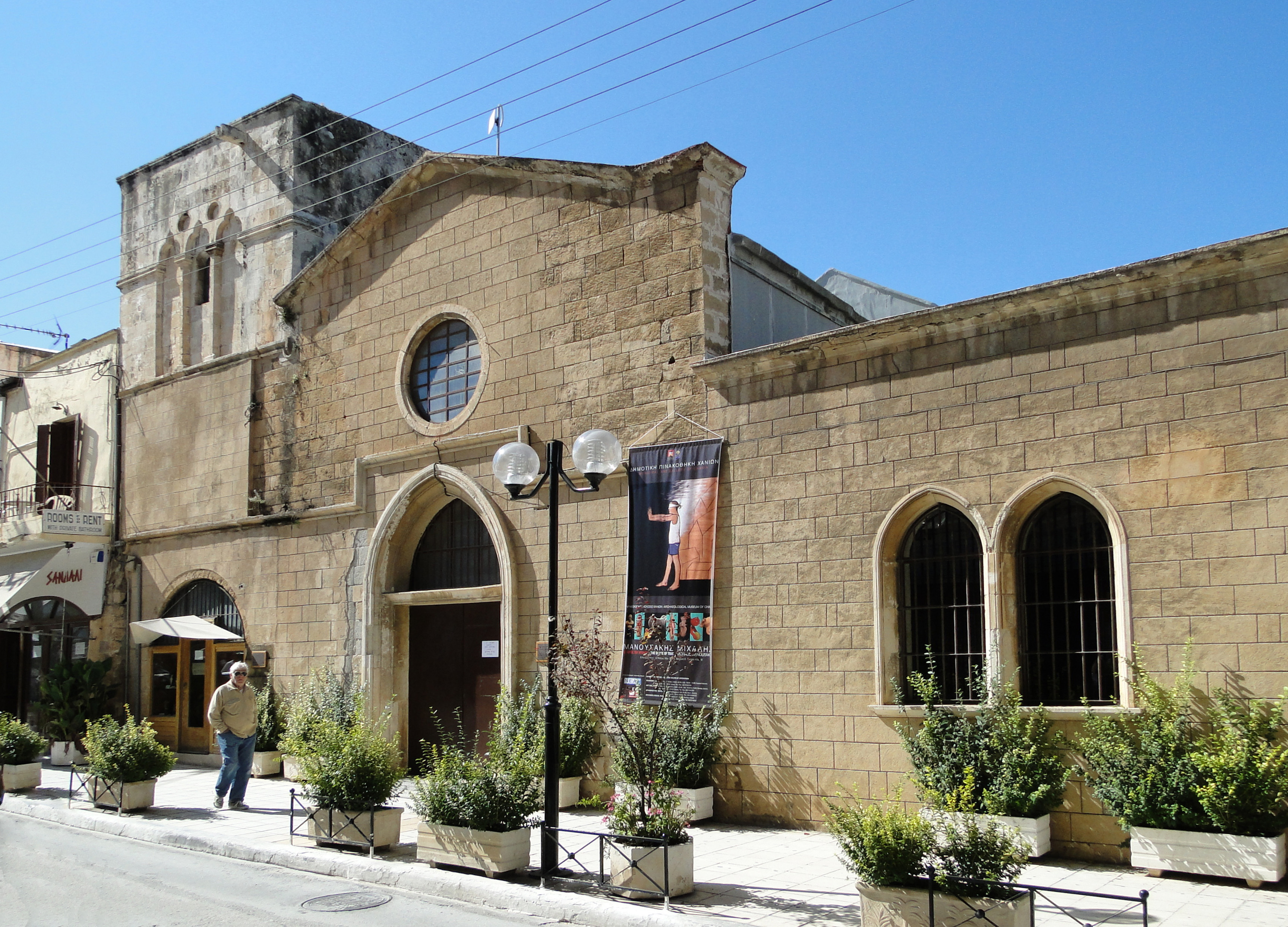
Archaeological Museum of Chania

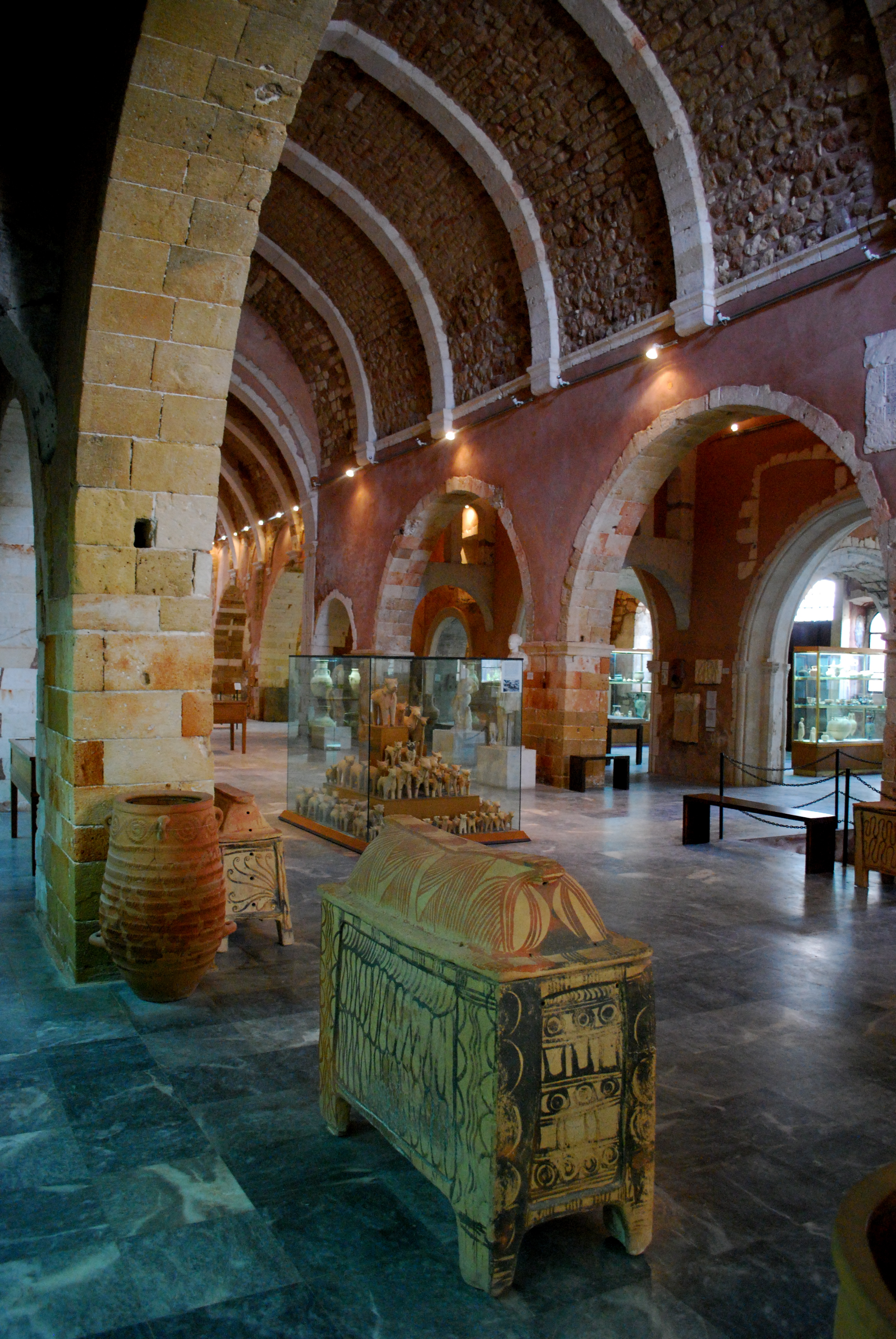
Archaeological Museum of Chania

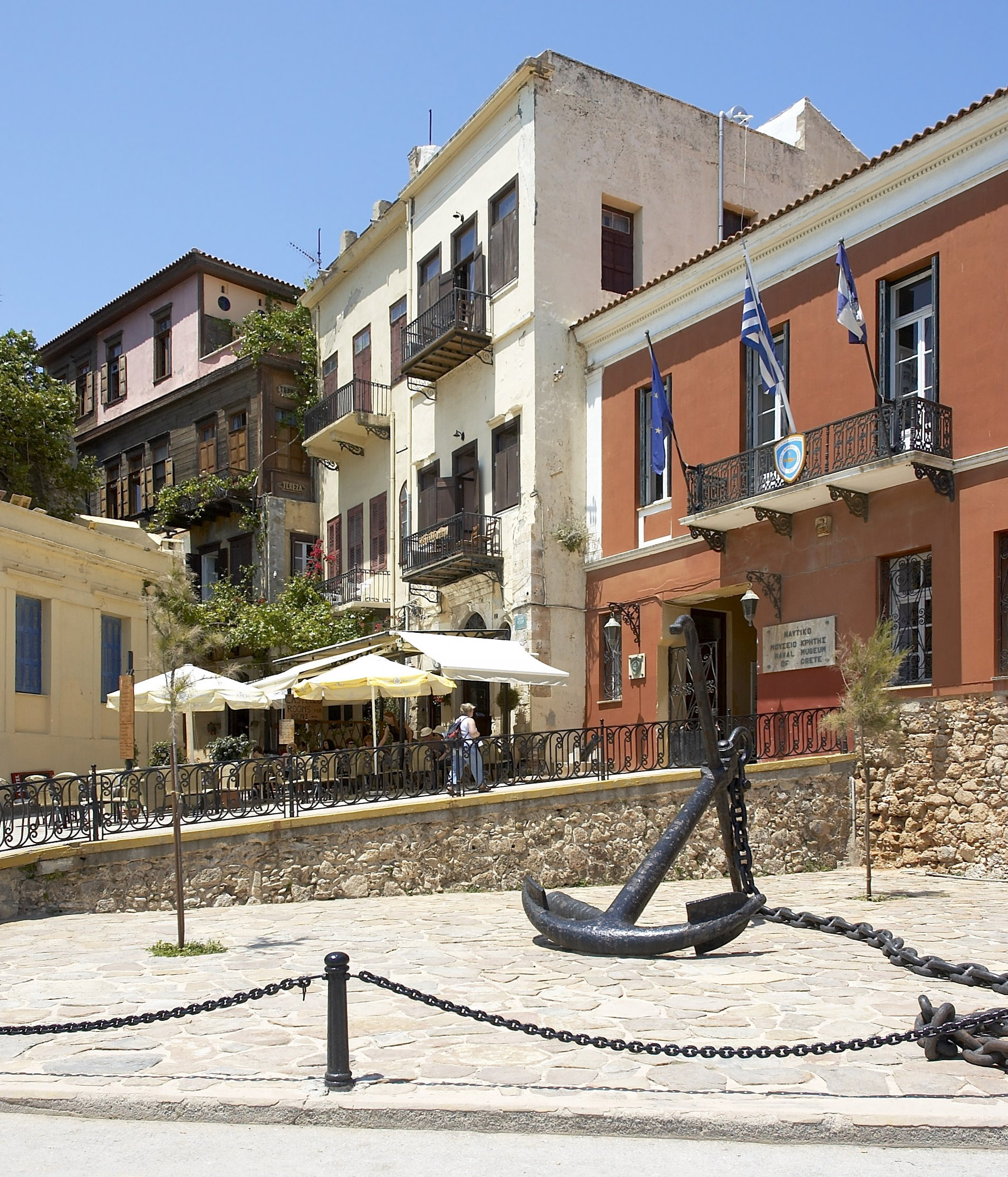
Maritime Museum of Crete

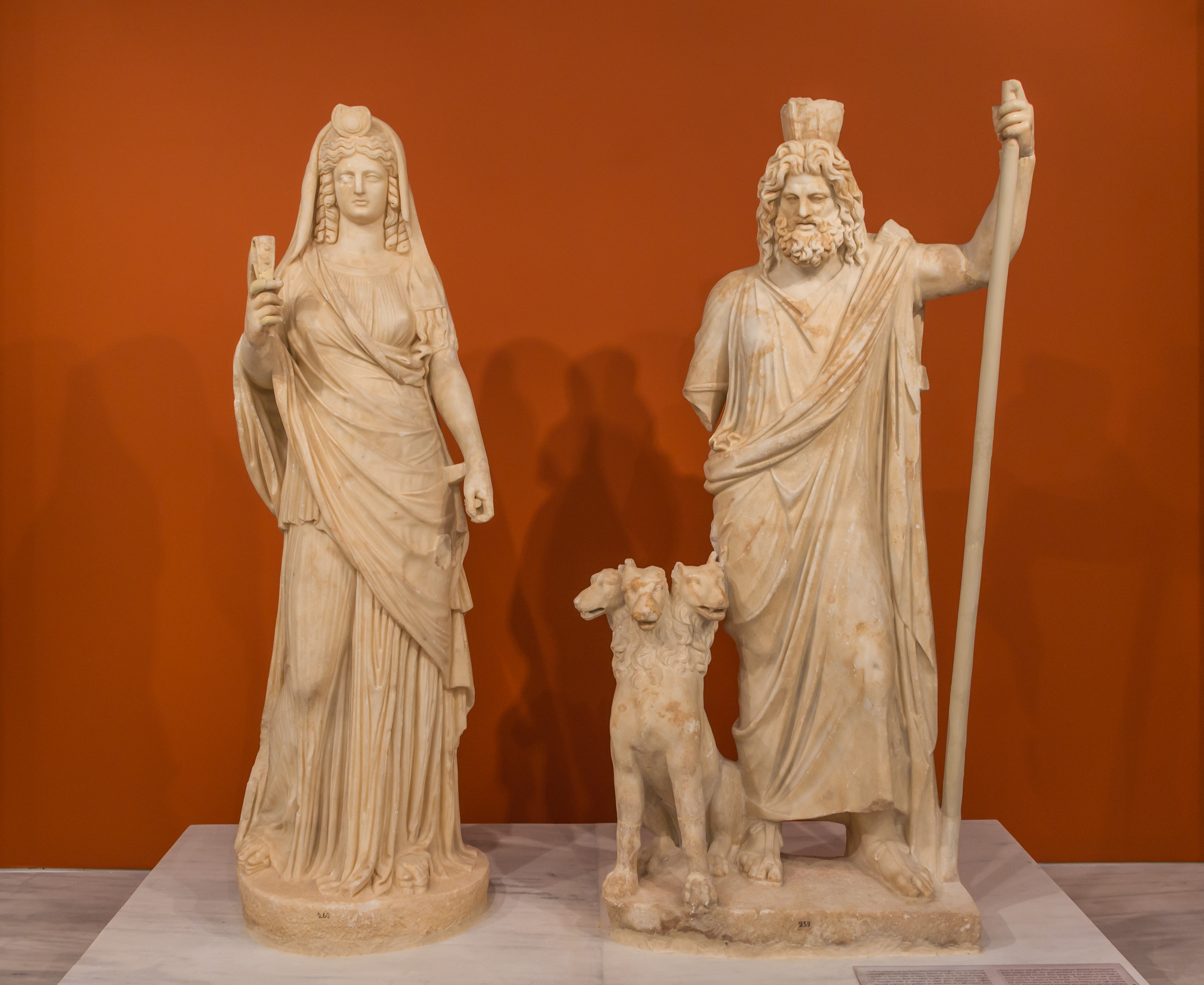
Pluto and Persephone in Heraklion Museum

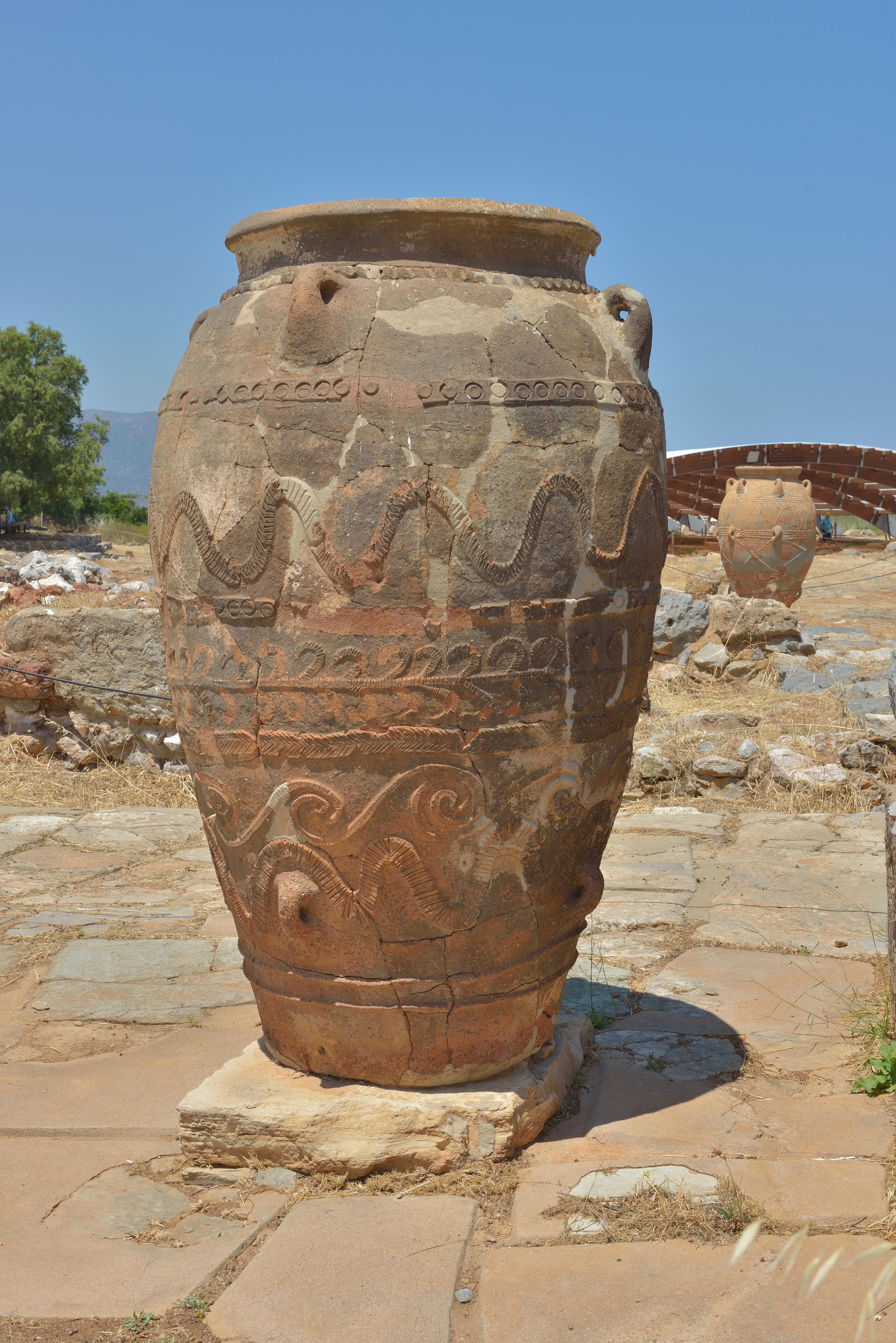
Jars in Malia, Crete

== Fauna and flora ==
=== Fauna ===
Crete is isolated from mainland Europe, Asia, and Africa, and this is reflected in the diversity of the fauna and flora. As a result, the fauna and flora of Crete have many clues to the evolution of species. There are no animals that are dangerous to humans on the island of Crete in contrast to other parts of Greece. Indeed, the ancient Greeks attributed the lack of large mammals such as bears, wolves, jackals, and venomous snakes, to the labour of Hercules (who took a live Cretan bull to the Peloponnese). Hercules wanted to honor the birthplace of Zeus by removing all "harmful" and "venomous" animals from Crete. Later, Cretans believed that the island was cleared of dangerous creatures by the Apostle Paul, who lived on the island of Crete for two years, with his exorcisms and blessings. The Natural History Museum of Crete, operates under the direction of the University of Crete and two aquariums – Aquaworld in Hersonissos and Cretaquarium in Gournes, display sea creatures common in Cretan waters.

==== Prehistoric fauna ====
Dwarf elephants, dwarf hippopotamus, dwarf mammoths, dwarf deer, and giant flightless owls were native to Pleistocene Crete. Their ancestors could have reached the island in the time of the Messinian salinity crisis.

==== Mammals ====
Mammals of Crete include the vulnerable kri-kri, Capra aegagrus cretica that can be seen in the national park of the Samaria Gorge and on Thodorou, Dia and Agioi Pantes (islets off the north coast), the Cretan wildcat and the Cretan spiny mouse. Other terrestrial mammals include subspecies of the Cretan marten, the Cretan weasel, the Cretan badger, the long-eared hedgehog, and the edible dormouse.

The Cretan shrew, a type of white-toothed shrew, is endemic to the island of Crete. It is a relic species of the Crocidura shrews of which fossils have been found that can be dated to the Pleistocene era. Today it can only be found in the highlands of Crete. It is considered to be the only surviving remnant of the endemic species of the Pleistocene Mediterranean islands.

Bat species include: Blasius's horseshoe bat, the lesser horseshoe bat, the greater horseshoe bat, the lesser mouse-eared bat, Geoffroy's bat, the whiskered bat, Kuhl's pipistrelle, the common pipistrelle, Savi's pipistrelle, the serotine bat, the long-eared bat, Schreibers' bat and the European free-tailed bat.

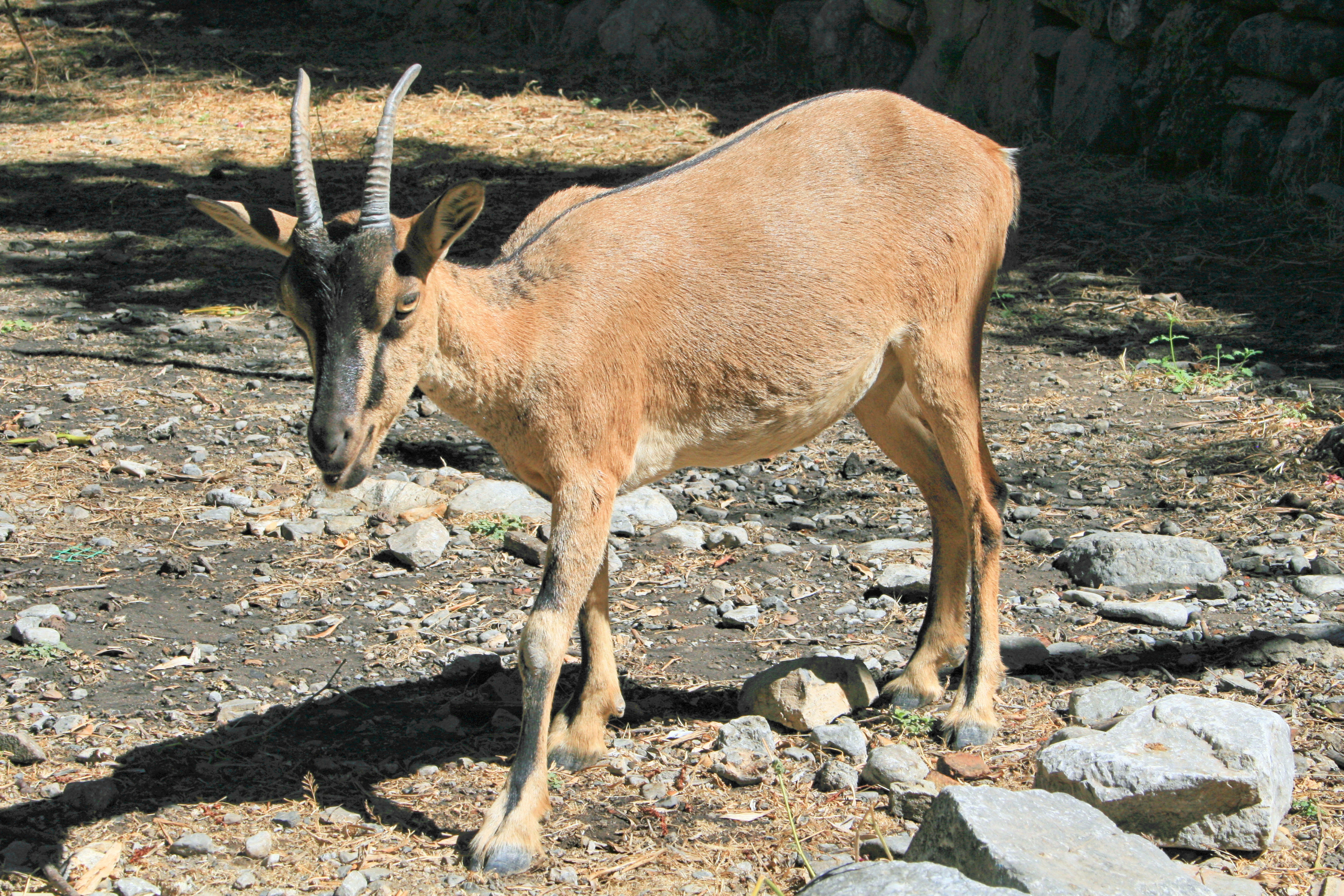
The kri-kri (the Cretan ibex) lives in protected natural parks at the gorge of Samaria and the island of Agios Theodoros.

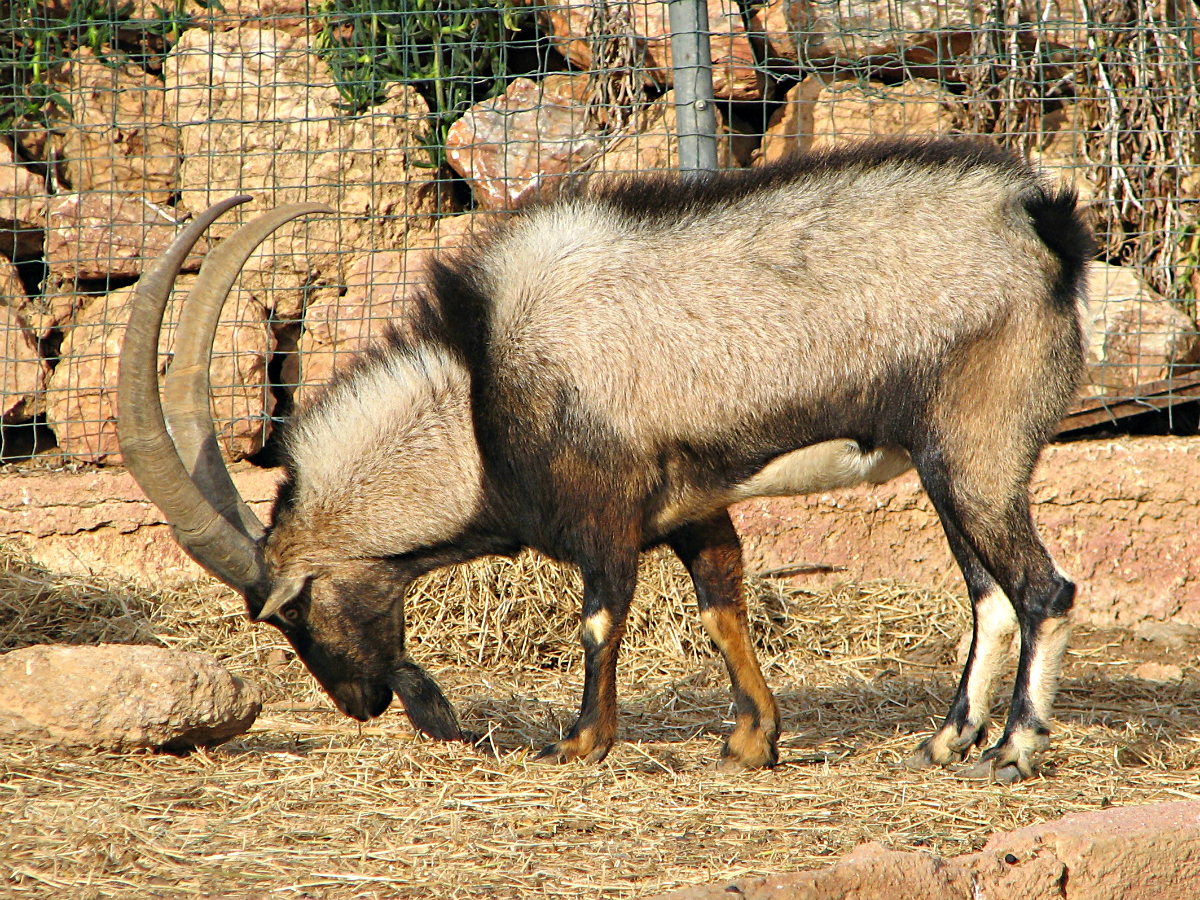
Male Cretan ibex

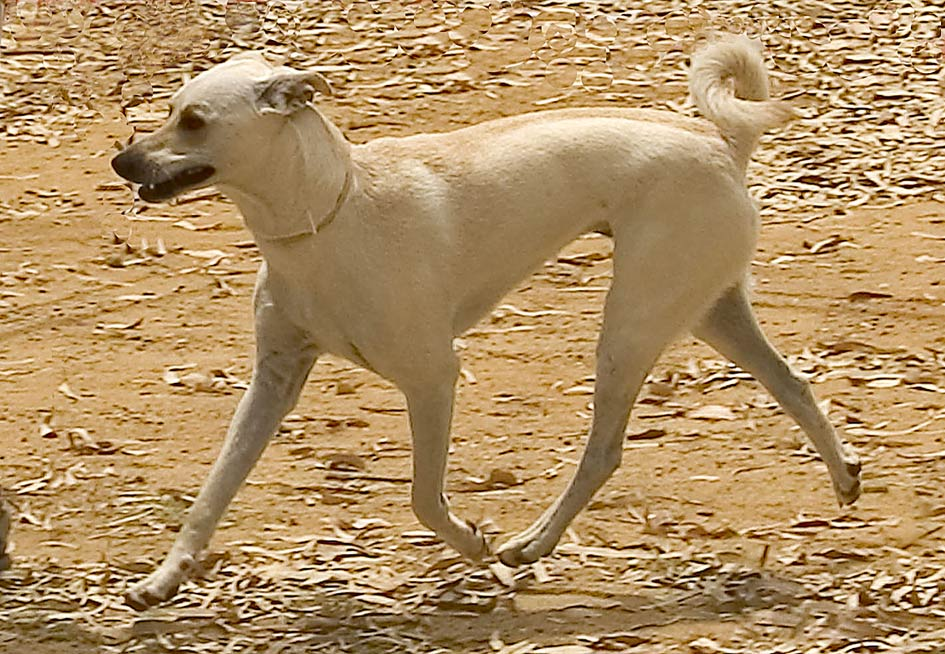
Cretan Hound or Kritikos Lagonikos, one of Europe's oldest hunting dog breeds

==== Birds ====
Varieties of birds include eagles (can be seen in Lasithi), swallows (throughout Crete in the summer and year-round in the south of the island), pelicans (along the coast), and common cranes (including Gavdos and Gavdopoula). The Cretan mountains and gorges are refuges for the endangered lammergeier vulture. Bird species include: the golden eagle, Bonelli's eagle, the bearded vulture or lammergeier, the griffon vulture, Eleonora's falcon, peregrine falcon, lanner falcon, European kestrel, tawny owl, little owl, hooded crow, alpine chough, red-billed chough, and the Eurasian hoopoe. The population of griffon vultures in Crete is the largest insular one of the species in the world and consists of the majority of the griffon vulture population in Greece.

==== Reptiles and amphibians ====
Tortoises can be seen throughout the island. Snakes can be found hiding under rocks. Toads and frogs reveal themselves when it rains. Reptiles include the Aegean wall lizard, Balkan green lizard, common chameleon, ocellated skink, snake-eyed skink, Moorish gecko, Turkish gecko, Kotschy's gecko, spur-thighed tortoise, and the Caspian turtle. There are four species of snake on the island and these are not dangerous to humans. The four species include the leopard snake (locally known as ochendra), the Balkan whip snake (locally called dendrogallia), the dice snake (called nerofido in Greek), and the only venomous snake is the nocturnal cat snake which has evolved to deliver a weak venom at the back of its mouth to paralyse geckos and small lizards, and is not dangerous to humans.

Sea turtles include the green turtle and the loggerhead turtle which are both threatened species. The loggerhead turtle nests and hatches on north-coast beaches around Rethymno and Chania, and south-coast beaches along the gulf of Mesara. Amphibians include the European green toad, American bullfrog (introduced), European tree frog, and the Cretan marsh frog (endemic).

==== Arthropods ====
Cicadas, known locally as tzitzikia, make a distinctive repetitive tzi tzi sound that becomes louder and more frequent on hot summer days. Butterfly species include the swallowtail butterfly. There are several species of scorpion such as Euscorpius carpathicus whose venom is generally no more potent than a mosquito bite.

==== Crustaceans and molluscs ====
River crabs include the semi-terrestrial Potamon potamios crab. Edible snails are widespread and can cluster in the hundreds waiting for rainfall to reinvigorate them.

==== Sealife ====
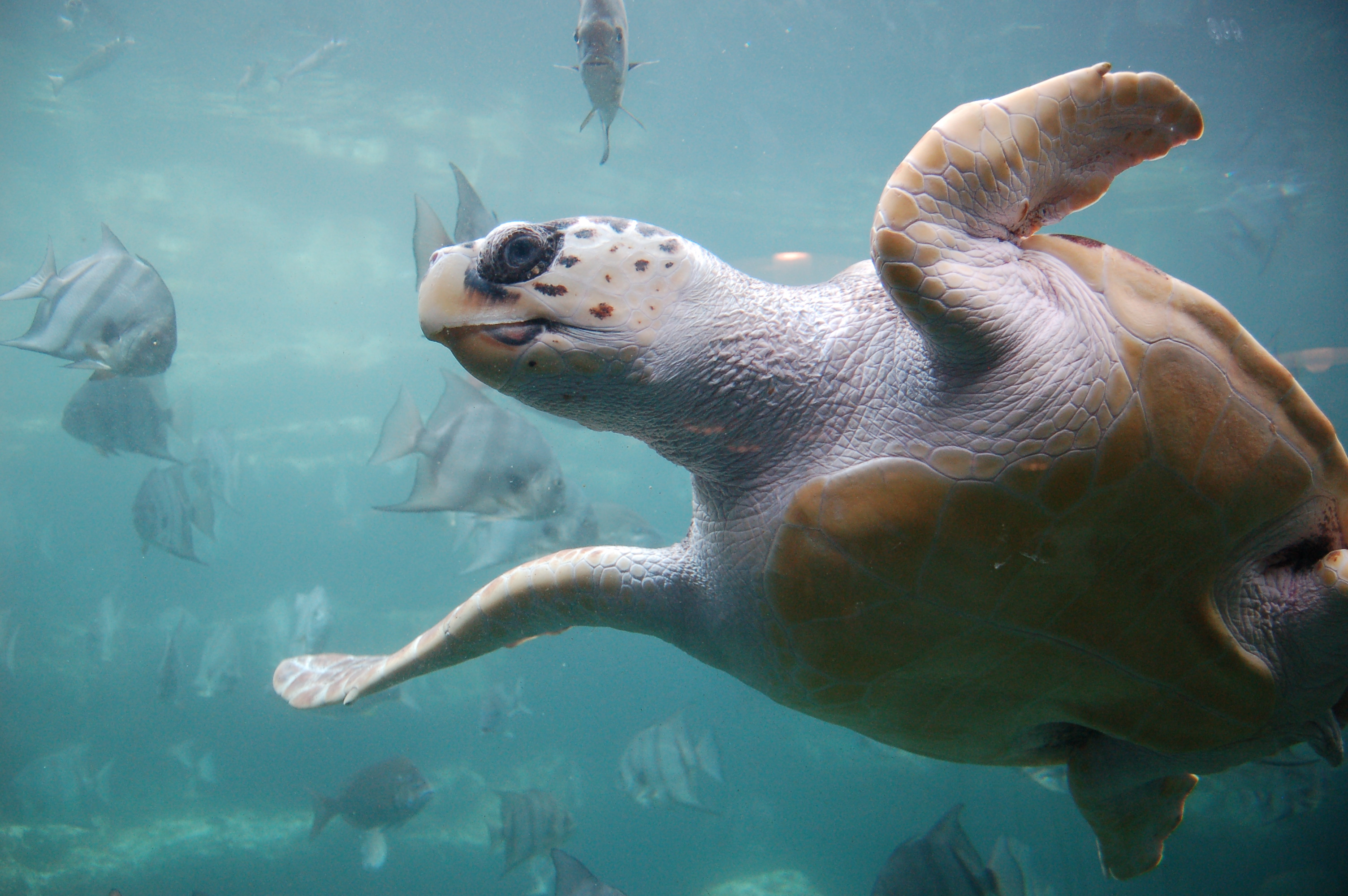
The loggerhead sea turtle nests and hatches along the beaches of Rethymno and Chania and the gulf of Messara.

Apart from terrestrial mammals, the seas around Crete are rich in large marine mammals. The endangered Mediterranean monk seal lives in almost all the coasts of the country. The area south of Crete, known as the Greek Abyss, hosts whales, sperm whales, dolphins and porpoises. The Minoan frescoes depicting dolphins in Queen's Megaron at Knossos indicate that Minoans were well aware of and celebrated these creatures. Squid, octopus, sea turtles and hammerhead sharks live or traverse along the coast.

Some of the fish of the waters around Crete include: scorpion fish, dusky grouper, east Atlantic peacock wrasse, five-spotted wrasse, weever fish, common stingray, brown ray, Mediterranean black goby, pearly razorfish, star-gazer, painted comber, damselfish, and the flying gurnard.

The Cretaquarium and the Aquaworld Aquarium, are two of the three aquariums in Greece. They are located in Gournes and Hersonissos respectively.

=== Flora ===
The Minoans contributed to the deforestation of Crete. Further deforestation occurred in the 1600s "so that no more local supplies of firewood were available".

Common wildflowers include: camomile, daisy, gladiolus, hyacinth, iris, poppy, cyclamen and tulip, among others. There are more than 200 species of wild orchid on the island and this includes 14 varieties of Ophrys cretica. Crete has a rich variety of indigenous herbs including common sage, rosemary, thyme, and oregano. Rare herbs include the endemic Cretan dittany and ironwort, Sideritis syriaca, known as malotira (μαλοτήρα). Varieties of cactus include the edible prickly pear. Common trees on the island include the chestnut, cypress, oak, olive tree, pine, plane, and tamarisk. Trees tend to be taller to the west of the island where water is more abundant.

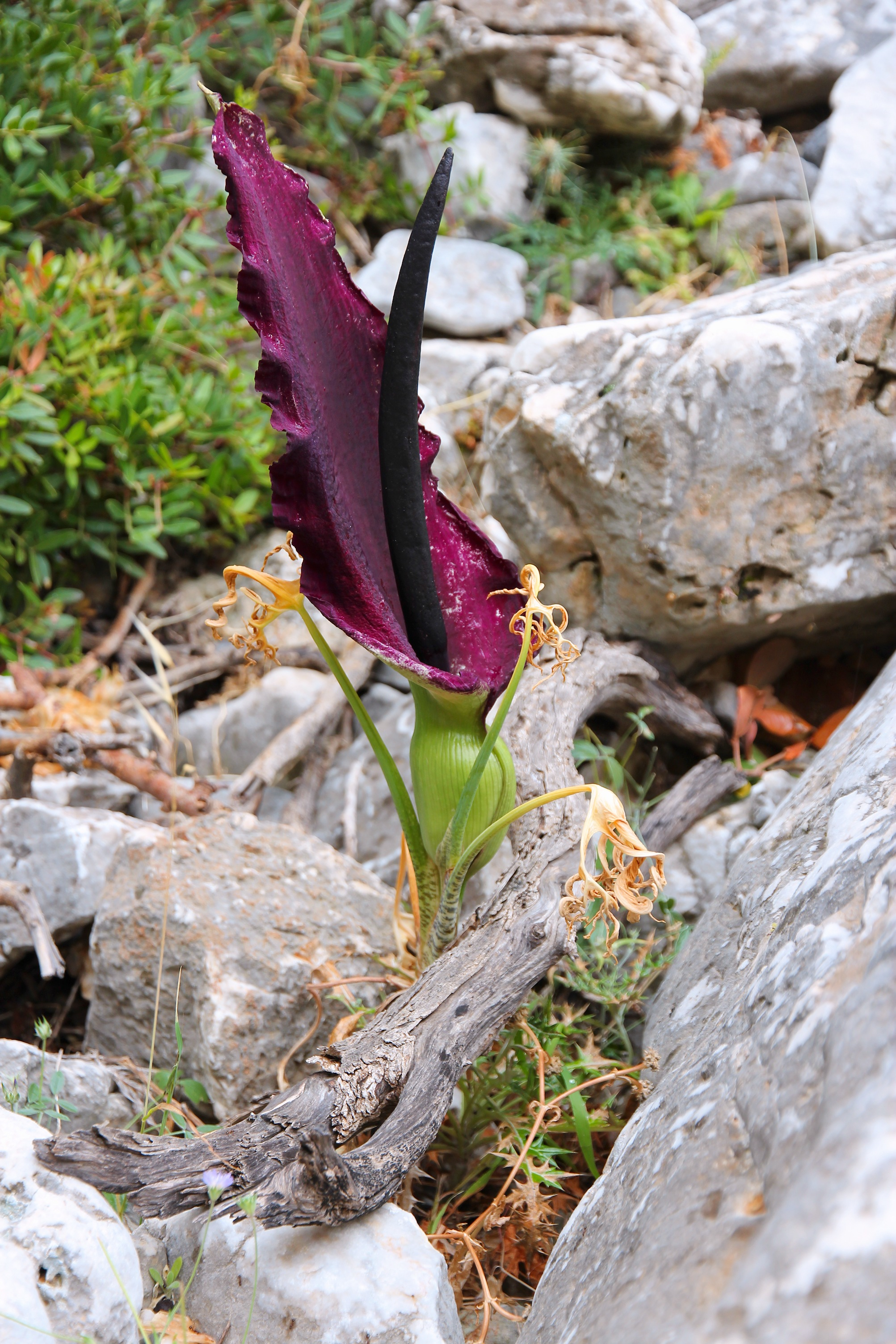
Snake lily (Dracunculus vulgaris)

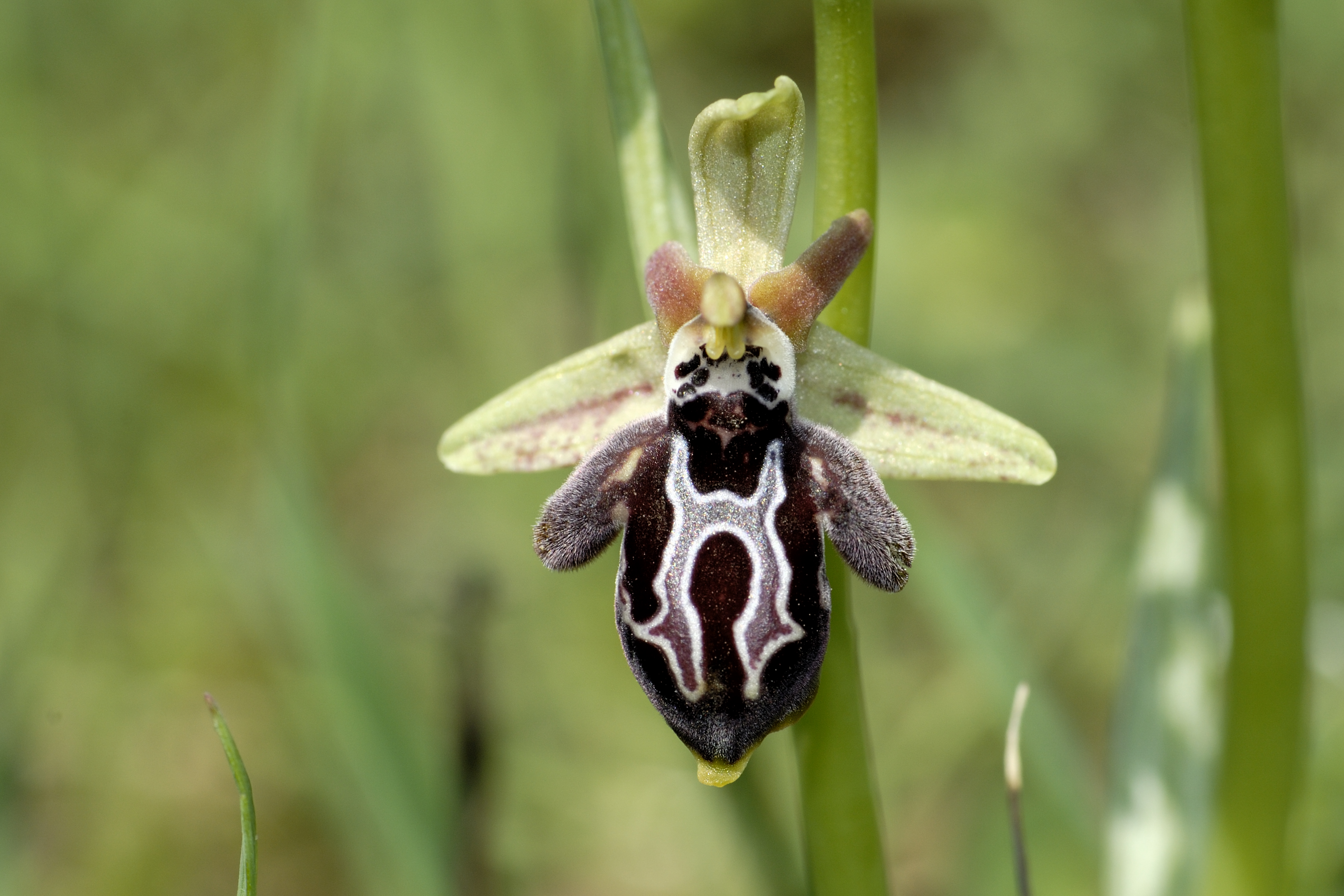
The Cretan bee-orchid Ophrys cretica

=== Environmentally protected areas ===
Environmentally protected areas include the island of Elafonisi on the coast of southwestern Crete, the palm forest of Vai in eastern Crete and the Dionysades (both in the municipality of Sitia, Lasithi). Vai has a palm beach and is the largest natural palm forest in Europe. The island of Chrysi, 15 kilometres (9 miles) south of Ierapetra, has the largest naturally-grown Juniperus macrocarpa forest in Europe. Samaria Gorge is a World Biosphere Reserve and Richtis Gorge is protected for its landscape diversity. Also, Sitia UNESCO Global Geopark, added in 2015 in UNESCO Geoparks, is located on the easternmost edge of Crete.

== Mythology ==
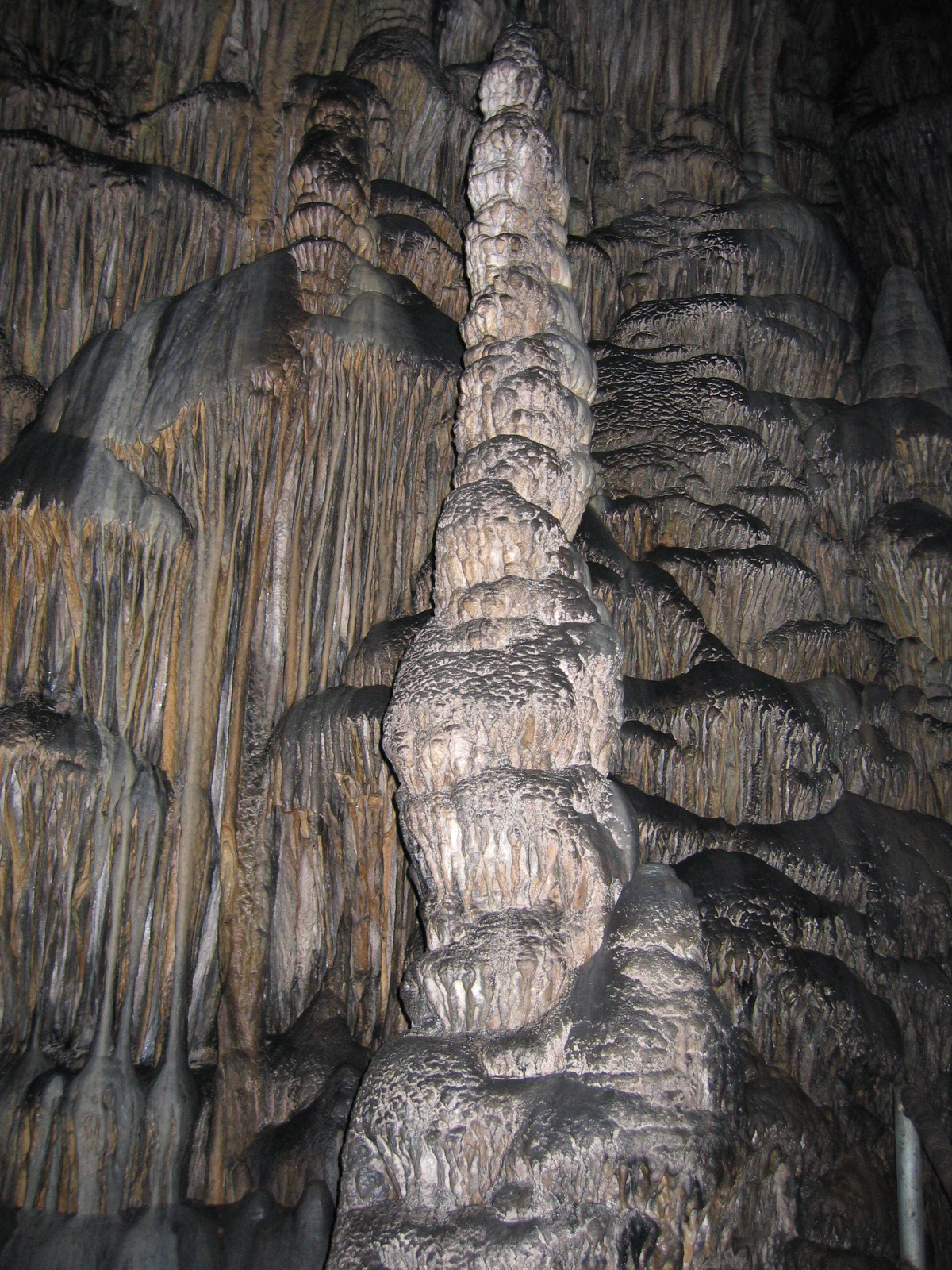
Diktaean Cave

Crete has a strong association with ancient Greek gods but is also connected with the Minoan civilization. According to Greek mythology, the Diktaean Cave at Mount Dikti was the birthplace of the god Zeus. The Paximadia islands were the birthplace of the goddess Artemis and the god Apollo. Their mother, the goddess Leto, was worshipped at Phaistos. The goddess Athena bathed in Lake Voulismeni. Zeus launched a lightning bolt at a giant lizard that was threatening Crete. The lizard immediately turned to stone and became the lizard-shaped island of Dia, which can be seen from Knossos. The islets of Lefkai were the result of a musical contest between the Sirens and the Muses. The Muses were so anguished to have lost that they plucked the feathers from the wings of their rivals; the Sirens turned white and fell into the sea at Aptera ("featherless"), where they formed the islands in the bay that were called Lefkai (the islands of Souda and Leon). Heracles, in one of his labors, took the Cretan bull to the Peloponnese. Europa and Zeus had sex at Gortys and conceived the kings of Crete: Rhadamanthys, Sarpedon, and Minos.

The labyrinth of the Palace of Knossos was the setting for the myth of Theseus and the Minotaur in which the Minotaur was slain by Theseus. Icarus and Daedalus were captives of King Minos and crafted wings to escape. After his death, King Minos became a judge of the dead in Hades, while Rhadamanthys became the ruler of the Elysian fields.

== Culture ==
Crete has its own distinctive Mantinades poetry. The island is known for its Mantinades-based music (typically performed with the Cretan lyra and the laouto) and has many indigenous dances, the most noted of which is the Pentozali. Since the 1980s and certainly in the 1990s onwards there has been a proliferation of cultural associations that teach dancing (in Western Crete where many focus on rizitiko singing). These associations often perform in official events but also become stages for people to meet and engage in traditional practices. The topic of tradition and the role of cultural associations in reviving it is often debated throughout Crete.

Cretan authors have made important contributions to Greek literature throughout the modern period; major names include Vikentios Kornaros, creator of the 17th-century epic romance Erotokritos (Greek Ερωτόκριτος), and, in the 20th century, Nikos Kazantzakis. In the Renaissance, Crete was the home of the Cretan School of icon painting, which influenced El Greco and through him subsequent European painting.

Cretans are proud of their island and customs, and men often don elements of traditional dress in everyday life: knee-high black riding boots (stivania), vráka breeches tucked into the boots at the knee, black shirt and black headdress consisting of a fishnet-weave kerchief worn wrapped around the head or draped on the shoulders (mantili / kefalomantilo). Men often grow large mustaches as a mark of pride, manhood and valiance.

Cretan society is known in Greece and internationally for family and clan vendettas which persist on the island to date. Cretans also have a tradition of keeping firearms at home, stemming from the era of resistance against the Ottoman Empire. Nearly every rural household on Crete has at least one unregistered gun. Guns are subject to strict regulation from the Greek government, and in recent years an effort to control firearms in Crete has been undertaken by the Greek police, but with limited success.

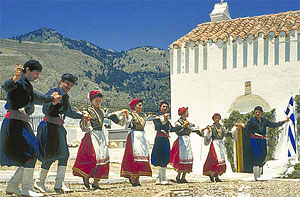
Dancers from Sfakia

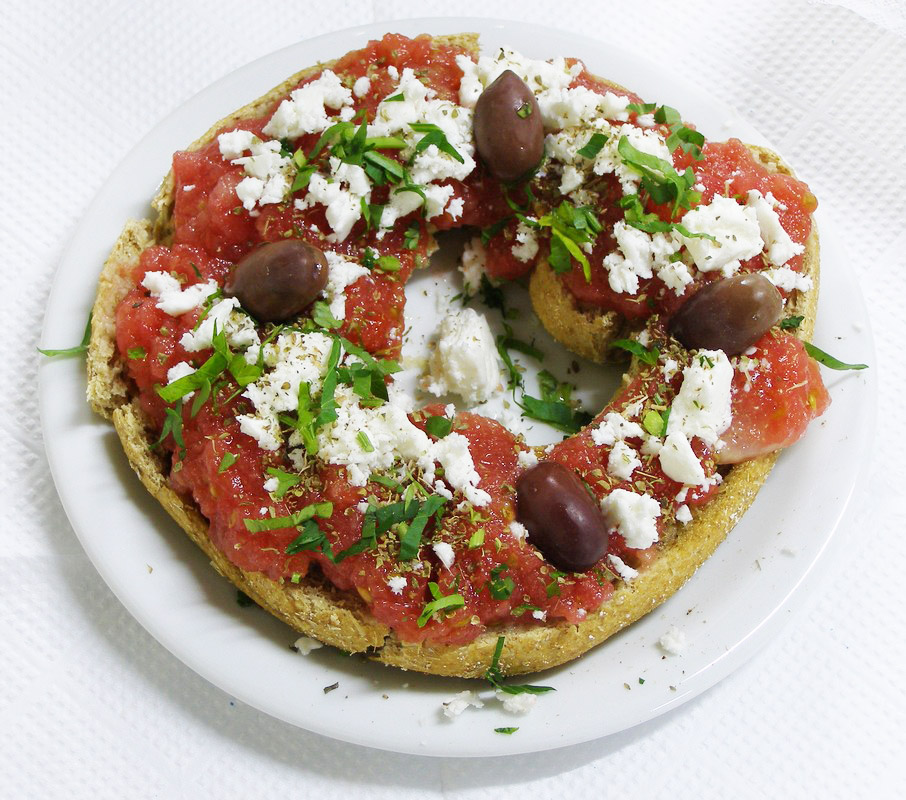
Dakos, traditional Cretan appetizer. Paximadi (hard bread) topped with fresh tomato, feta cheese, oregano, and olives drizzled with olive oil.

=== Sports ===
Crete has many football clubs playing in the national and the local leagues. During the 2026–27 season, OFI, which plays at Pankritio Stadium (Heraklion), is a member of the Super League Greece. In the 2026–27 season, ten Cretan clubs compete against each other in Group 10 of the Gamma Ethniki, including teams with years of presence in the national divisions such as Ergotelis, Platanias, Chania City, Atsalenios, Rethymniakos, Episkopi, and Agios Nikolaos.

== Notable people ==
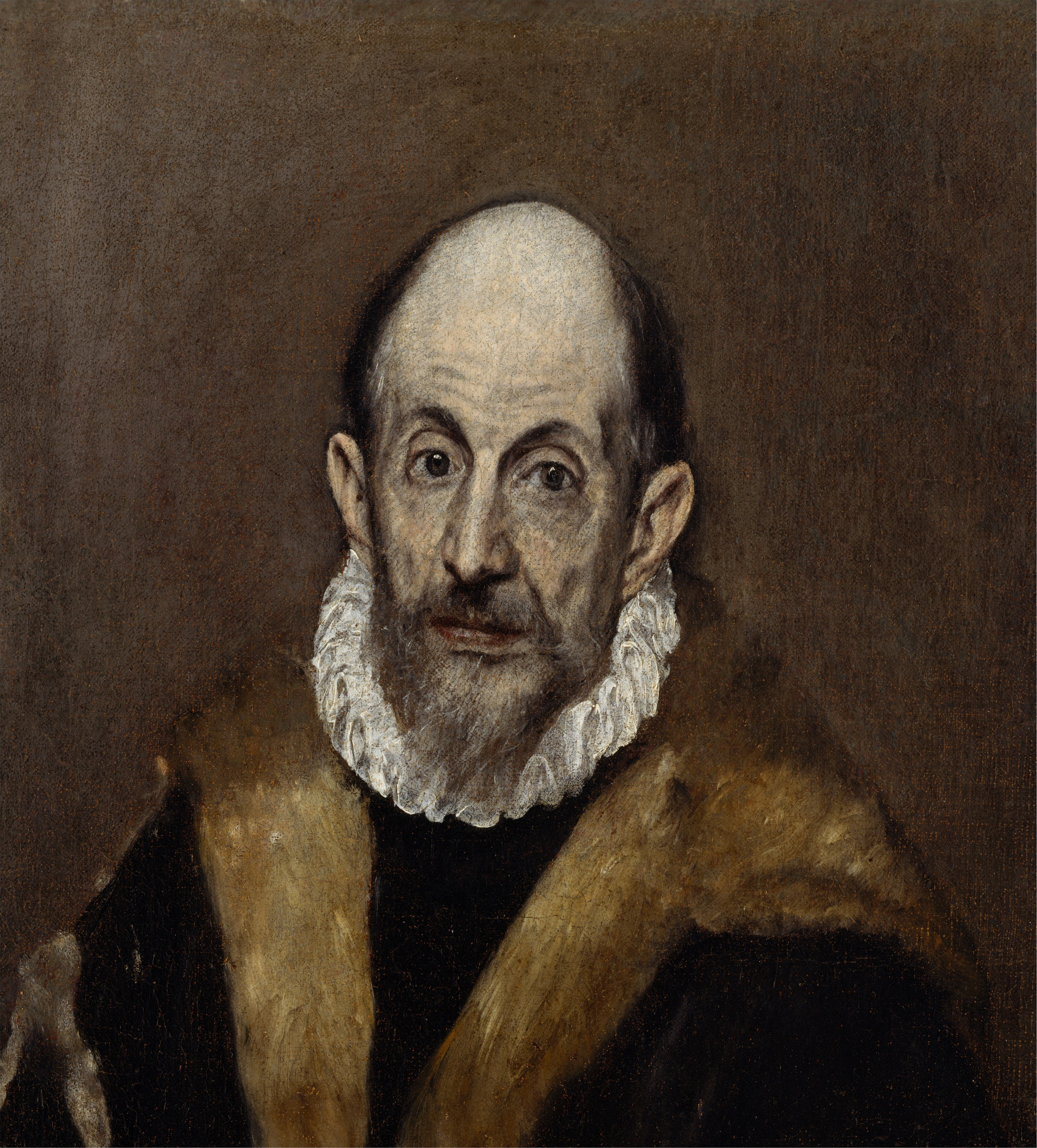
Domenikos Theotokopoulos (El Greco)

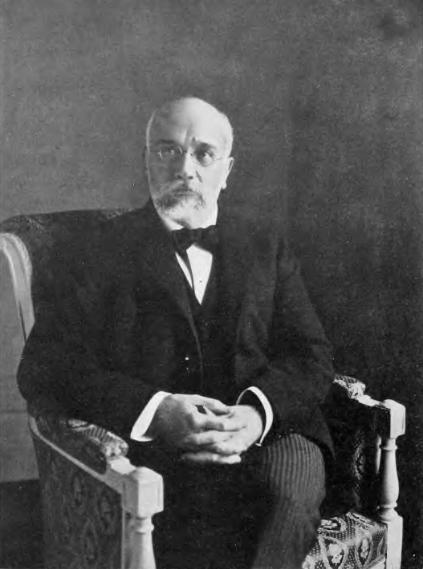
Eleftherios Venizelos

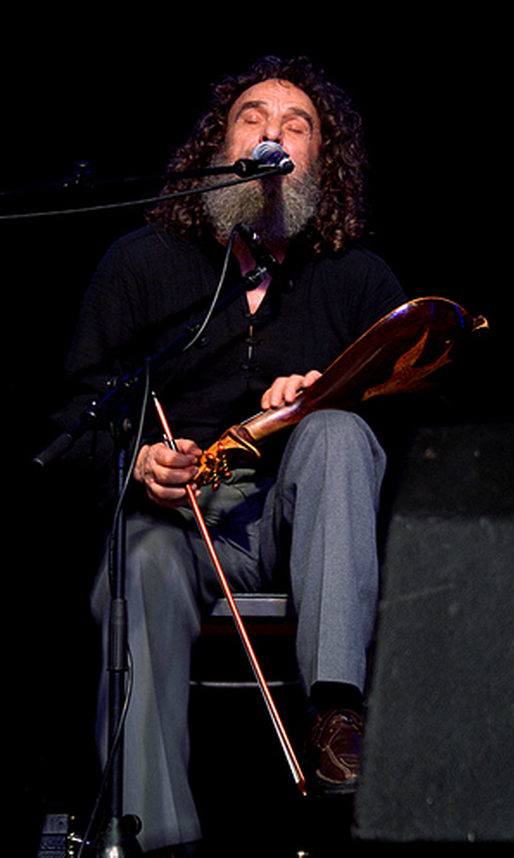
Psarantonis

Notable people from Crete include:

- Nearchus, navarch of the navy of Alexander the Great
- Domenikos Theotokopoulos (El Greco) (1541–1614), Greek painter, sculptor and architect of the Spanish Renaissance, born in Heraklion
- Georgios Chortatzis (1545–1610), Greek dramatist in Cretan verse, born in Rethymno
- Vitsentzos Kornaros (1553–1613), Renaissance author from Sitia, who lived in Heraklion (then Candia)
- Ioannis Vlachos (Daskalogiannis) (1722/30–1771), wealthy shipbuilder and shipowner, leader of the Orlov Revolt in Crete in 1770
- Michalis Kourmoulis (1765–1824), leader of the Greek War of Independence from Messara
- Eleftherios Venizelos (1864–1936), Greek statesman, Prime Minister of Greece from 1910 to 1933, born in Chania Prefecture
- Nikos Kazantzakis (1883–1957), Greek writer, journalist, politician, poet and philosopher, seven times nominated for the Nobel Prize, born in Heraklion
- Mikis Theodorakis (1925–2021), Greek composer and lyricist
- Nick Dandolos (1883–1966), a.k.a. "Nick the Greek", professional gambler and high roller, born in Rethymno
- Louis Tikas (1886–1914), Greek-American labor union leader from Loutra, Rethymno
- Odysseas Elytis (1911–1996), Greek poet, essayist and translator, Nobel Prize winner, born in Heraklion
- Konstantinos Mitsotakis (1918–2017), Greek liberal politician and statesman, Prime Minister of Greece from 1990 to 1993 (nephew of Eleftherios Venizelos and father of Kyriakos Mitsotakis)
- George Psychoundakis (1920–2006), shepherd, war hero and author, born in Asi Gonia
- John Aniston (Giannis Anastasakis) (1933–2022), Greek-American actor, born in Chania (father of Jennifer Aniston)
- Nana Mouskouri (born 1934), singer and politician, born in Chania
- Nikos Xylouris (1936–1980), a.k.a. "Psaronikos", Greek singer/songwriter and Cretan lyra player, born in Anogeia
- Antonis Xylouris (born 1937), a.k.a. "Psarantonis", Greek composer, folk singer and Cretan lyra player, born in Anogeia (brother of Nikos Xylouris)
- Joseph Sifakis (born 1946), Greek-French computer scientist, laureate of the 2007 Turing Award, born in Heraklion
- George Karniadakis (born 1959), Greek-American research scientist, Professor of Applied Mathematics at Brown University
- Tess Fragoulis (born 1964), Greek-Canadian writer and educator, born in Heraklion
- Zach Galifianakis (born 1969), American actor whose paternal grandparents were from Crete
- Constantinos Daskalakis (born 1981), Greek theoretical computer scientist whose grandparents were from Crete
- Eleni Daniilidou (born 1982), tennis player, born in Chania
- Georgos Kalaitzakis (born 1999), Greek professional basketball player, born in Heraklion

=== Mythology ===
- Minoas
- Minotaur
- Ariadne
- Phaedra
- Pasiphae
- Idomeneus

== See also ==
- Cretan Greek
- Cretan lyra
- Cretan wine
- List of novels set in Crete
- List of rulers of Crete
- Mantinades

== General and cited sources ==
- Canard, M. (1971). "Iḳrīṭis̲h̲". In Lewis, B.; Ménage, V. L.; Pellat, Ch. & Schacht, J. (eds.). The Encyclopaedia of Islam, Second Edition. Volume III: H–Iram. Leiden: E. J. Brill. pp. 1082–1086. OCLC 495469525.
- "Crete" . Encyclopædia Britannica. Vol. 7 (11th ed.). 1911. pp. 418–430.
- Francis, Jane and Anna Kouremenos (eds.) 2016. Roman Crete: New Perspectives. Oxford: Oxbow.
- Gregory, T. E.; Kazhdan, A. (1991). "Crete". In Kazhdan, Alexander (ed.). The Oxford Dictionary of Byzantium. Oxford and New York: Oxford University Press. ISBN 0-19-504652-8.
- Margaritis, Giorgos (2006). Ιστορία του ελληνικού εμφυλίου πολέμου 1946-1949 [History of the Greek Civil War 1946-1949] (in Greek). Vol. II. Athens: Vivliorama. ISBN 9608087139.
- Panagiotakis, Nikolaos M., ed. (1987). "Εισαγωγικό Σημείωμα ("Introduction")". Crete, History and Civilization (in Greek). Vol. I. Vikelea Library, Association of Regional Associations of Regional Municipalities. pp. XI–XX.
- Provatakis, Theocharis (1980). Monastery of Arkadi. Athens: Toubi's.
- Treadgold, Warren (1997). A History of the Byzantine State and Society. Stanford, California: Stanford University Press. ISBN 0-8047-2630-2.
