= Agios Georgios =

Agios Georgios (Greek: Άγιος Γεώργιος, for Saint George) may refer to the following places:

== In Greece ==
- In Achaea:
  - Agios Georgios Langoura, a neighbourhood in Patras
  - Agios Georgios Riou, older name for Rio
- Agios Georgios, Aetolia-Acarnania, part of Missolonghi, Aetolia-Acarnania
- Agios Georgios, Arcadia part of the municipality of North Kynouria, Arcadia
- Agios Georgios, Boeotia, part of the municipal unit of Koroneia, Boeotia
- Agios Georgios Sykousis, a village in the municipal unit of Kampochora, Chios
- Agios Georgios, Corfu, a municipal unit in the island of Corfu
- Agios Georgios, Argyrades a municipal unit of Argyrades in South Corfu
- In Attica:
  - Agios Georgios (island) an uninhabited island in the Saronic archipelago, at the mouth of the Saronic Gulf
- In Elis:
  - Agios Georgios, Andravida, part of the municipal unit of Andravida
  - Agios Georgios, Pyrgos, part of Pyrgos
- Agios Georgios, Euboea, part of the municipal unit of Avlon, Euboea
- Agios Georgios, Grevena, a village in the municipal unit Irakleotes, Grevena regional unit
- Agios Georgios, Imathia, part of the municipal unit of Dovras, Imathia
- Agios Georgios, Karditsa, part of the municipal unit of Mitropoli, Karditsa regional unit
- Agios Georgios, Laconia part of the municipal unit of Voies, Laconia
- In the Larissa regional unit:
  - Agios Georgios, Farsala, part of the municipal unit of Enippeas
  - Agios Georgios, Kileler, part of the municipal unit of Krannonas
- In Lasithi:
  - Agios Georgios Lassithi, Oropedio Lasithiou, part of the municipality of Oropedio Lasithiou
  - Agios Georgios, Siteia, part of the municipality of Siteia
- In Magnesia:
  - Agios Georgios Feron, part of the municipal unit of Feres
  - Agios Georgios Nileias, part of the municipal unit of Milies
- Agios Georgios, Phocis, part of the municipal unit of Amfissa, Phocis
- In Phthiotis:
  - Agios Georgios Domokou, a village in the municipal unit of Xyniada
  - Agios Georgios Tymfristou, a municipal unit
- Agios Georgios, Preveza, part of the municipal unit of Filippiada, Preveza regional unit
- Agios Georgios, Thessaloniki, a municipal unit in the Thessaloniki regional unit

== In Cyprus ==
- Agios Georgios, Famagusta (Turkish: Aygün), near Trikomo, Cyprus
- Agios Georgios, Kyrenia (Turkish: Karaoğlanoğlu), near Kyrenia
- Agios Georgios, Limassol
- Agios Georgios, Nicosia, near Agia Marina
- Agios Georgios, Paphos
- Agios Georgios cemetery, Larnaca
- Agios Georgios (refugee settlement), Larnaca

== Other uses ==
- MV Agios Georgios, any of several ships
