= Agios Georgios, Lasithi =

Village in Crete, Greece

Agios Georgios Άγιος Γεώργιος Λασιθίου
- Community
- Location within Greece
- Coordinates: 35°09′58″N 25°29′03″E
- Country: Greece
- Administrative region: Crete
- Regional unit: Lasithi
- Municipality: Oropedio Lasithiou
- Elevation: 840 m (2,760 ft)

Population (2021)
  - Community: 544
- Time zone: UTC+2 (EET)
  - Summer (DST): UTC+3 (EEST)

Agios Georgios is a village in the Lasithi Plateau in the island of Crete, and also a municipal unit. Agios Georgios lies at an altitude of 840 metres (2,760 ft). In 1981 its population was 1,030, but has steadily fallen since to 717 in 1991; 541 in 2001, and 490 in 2011.

Locations near Agios Georgios include the small village of Koudoumalia and the village of Avrakode and also Limnakaro Plateau (height 1,314 metres (4,311 ft)).

It is the second largest village in Lasithi Plateau, home of a Folklore Museum, the only elementary school in Lasithi Plateau and also the only kindergarten in the Municipality.

It also has a small historical museum pharmacy, hotels and small restaurants.

It is a starting point for an ascent of the Dikti (height 2,148 metres (7,047 ft)), and the E4 trail goes through the village. Many people with ancestry from the village of Agios Georgios live now in Heraklion and in Hersonissos. In wintertime, when the Lasithi Plateau is snow-covered, many of the villagers in Agios Georgios would have descended to occupy the settlement of Analipsi on the northern coast of Crete, 5 km west of Hersonisssos and part of the Hersonissos Municipality where they cultivated olives.
