= Kroustalenia Monastery =

Monastery in Greece

- Μονή Κρουσταλλένιας
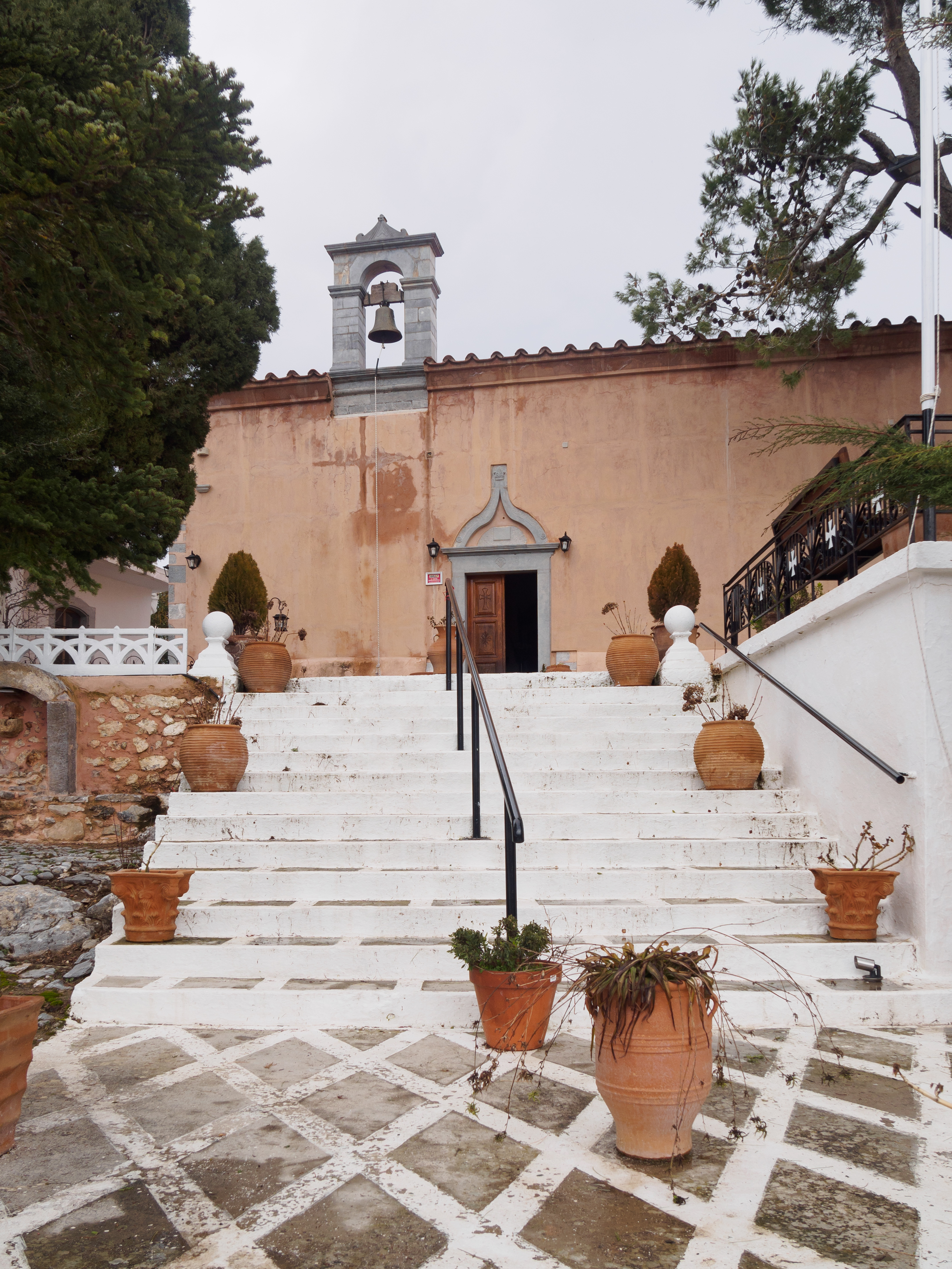
- Interactive map of Kroustalenia Monastery

Monastery information
- Other names: Dormition of Theotokos Kroustalenia Monastery
- Established: 1241
- Dedicated to: Dormition of Theotokos
- Celebration date: August 15
- Diocese: Metropolis of Petra and Heronissos

Site
- Location: Saint Konstantinos, Lasithi, Crete
- Country: Greece
- Coordinates: 35°10′46″N 25°30′11″E

The Kroustalenia Monastery (Greek: Μονή Κρουσταλλένιας) is an Orthodox monastery located in the Community of Saint Konstantinos of the Municipality of Oropedio Lasithi, in eastern Crete, near the village of Saint Konstantinos. It is dedicated to the Dormition of the Virgin. It is 41 km from Agios Nikolaos. The monastery is built on a small mound on the Lasithi plateau.

== Historical facts ==
It is not known when the monastery was founded exactly. Vasileios Psilakis reported that revolutionaries gathered in the monastery in 1272 to pray before the Lasithi plateau became a base for the revolution. Nikos Psilakis states that this information implies that the monastery existed from the second Byzantine period. The old agiothyrido of the monastery is dated 1241. However, the Venetians, in the context of suppressing revolutions, prohibited access to the plateau from 1293 to 1543, with severe penalties for violators, even death.

With the resettlement of the population in the 16th century, the nuns Palantia and Theokliti, from the Peloponnese, arrived on the plateau. The nun Palantia, from the monastery of Panagia tou Spileio, founded the monastery of Krustallenia, while the nun Theokliti founded the monastery of Saint Pelagia, of which only the temple is now preserved. After the conquest of Crete by the Ottomans, male monks settled in the monastery. During the Ottoman years, the monastery became a meeting place for the captains of the area. It was also a place of hospitality for foreigners, such as the traveler Siber in 1817.

During the revolution of 1821, the monastery was looted and set on fire by the Turkish-Egyptian troops in January 1823. In 1834, A. Frabreguettes visited the monastery, which, he notes, had not yet been restored. During the revolution of 1866, the monastery was the seat of the Revolutionary Committee of the Eastern Provinces and had ammunition depots. So during the Battle of Lasithi (May 20–30, 1867) the monastery was destroyed again by the Ottoman forces. After the revolution, most of the buildings of the monastery were built from scratch.

A school operated in the monastery from the middle of the 19th century until 1926.
