= Mnemata =

Mnemata is a locality in Larnaca, Cyprus. An archaeological site named the Mnemata Site is located here. Over the site a supermarket now stands.

The area "had been used as a cemetery from the beginning of the Iron Age until the Roman times", and there were four cemeteries in its environs in 1989.

== Archaeological excavation site ==
The site—at the western necropolis of the city-kingdom of Kition—"that became known as the Agios Georgios cemetery, occupies the entire flat surface of the eminence an elevated land area or a hill" at Mnemata.

== Etymology ==
Mnemata means graves.
