= Mnemata Site =

Archaeological site in Larnaca, Cyprus

The Mnemata Site is an archaeological excavation site at the Mnemata locality of Larnaca, Cyprus. A tomb was discovered in 1979—during the construction of a refugee settlement.

A supermarket was built over the excavation site . The site is located on the city block east of the junction of Plateia Mitropoleos and Nikodimou Mylona Street.

The site has been referred to as Agios Georgios cemetery, in various interim reports. (There are other institutions in the same city that are known as Agios Georgios. One is the Agios Georgios refugee settlement—the other is the cemetery on Agiou Georgiou Kontou Street. (An "Ancient Kition" text on a roadsign, points toward the cemetery on Agiou Georgiou Kontou Street.)

Other archaeological sites in its vicinity include the Pervolia Site, located north-east of Mnemata.

== Name ==
Mnemata is the name of the locality, and it means "graves".

The Mnemata Site is also known as the Agios Georgios cemetery, because a tomb was found in 1979 during the construction of a refugee settlement called Agios Georgios. Other tombs were later found on site.

== History ==
During the construction of the Agios Georgios refugee settlement, a tomb was discovered on March 22, 1979. In 1979, 63 tombs were excavated there.

In 1989 Michael Heltzer said that the Ayious Georghios-Mnimata site had an unexcavated southern part that lies 700 metres (2,300 ft) northwest of Kition's city wall, and 1,500 metres (4,900 ft) northwest of the seashore. "The site had been used as a cemetery from the beginning of the Iron Age until the Roman times", and there were four cemeteries in its environs in 1989.
