= Aposelemis Dam =

Dam in Crete, Greece

Coordinates: 35.249°N 25.401°E

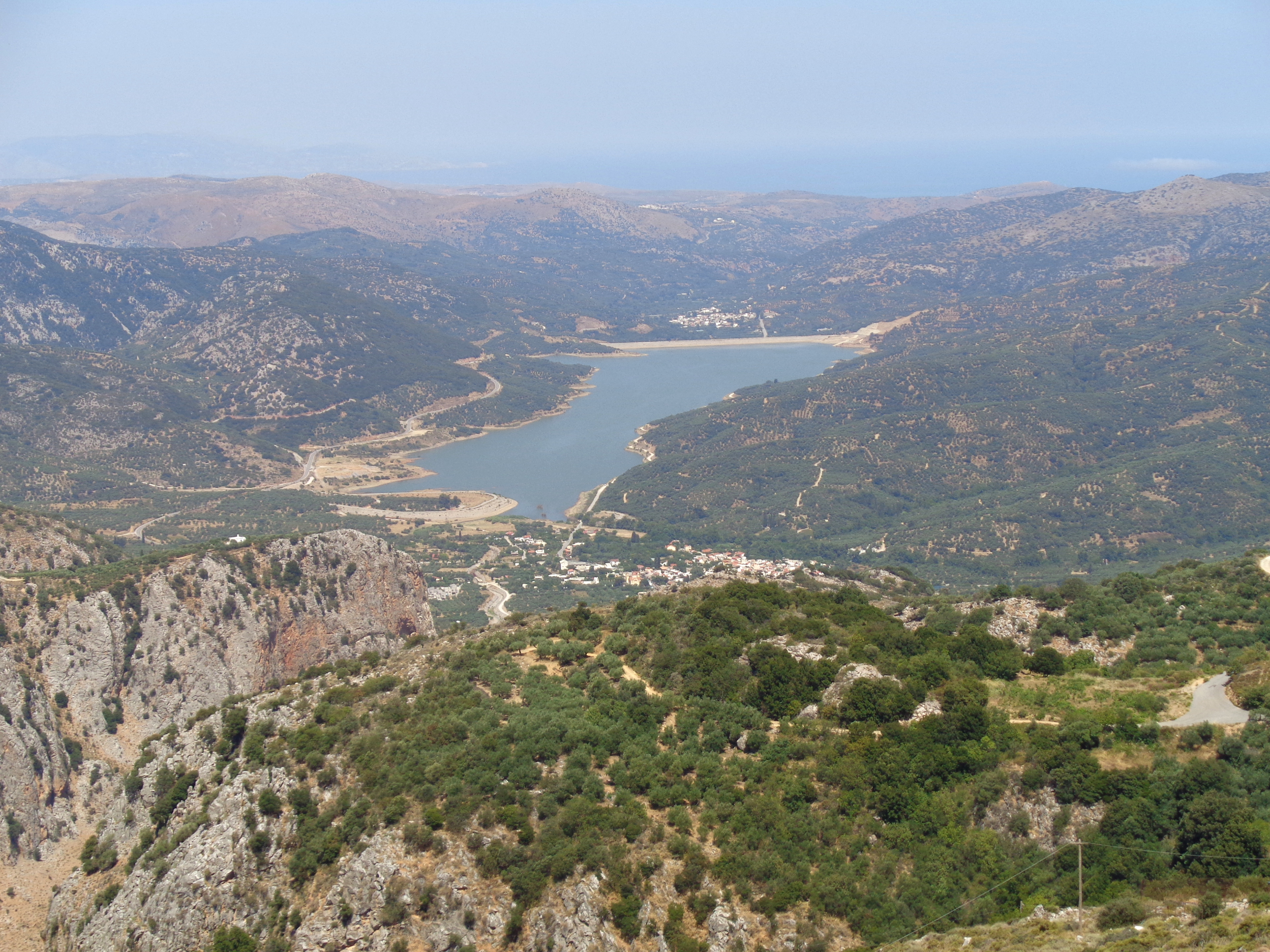
Overview of Aposelemis lake with the dam in the distance

Aposelemis Dam (Greek: Φράγμα Αποσελέμη) is an earthen embankment dam on the Aposelemis River near the villages of Potamies and Avdou, 32 kilometres (20 mi) southeast of Heraklion, Greece. The dam is the largest water management project in Crete. It creates Aposelemis lake, a reservoir that serves as the primary fresh water supply for the cities of Heraklion and Agios Nikolaos plus 6 smaller municipalities and 19 communities along the touristically developed north coast of Crete with a combined population of 300,000 inhabitants.

== History ==
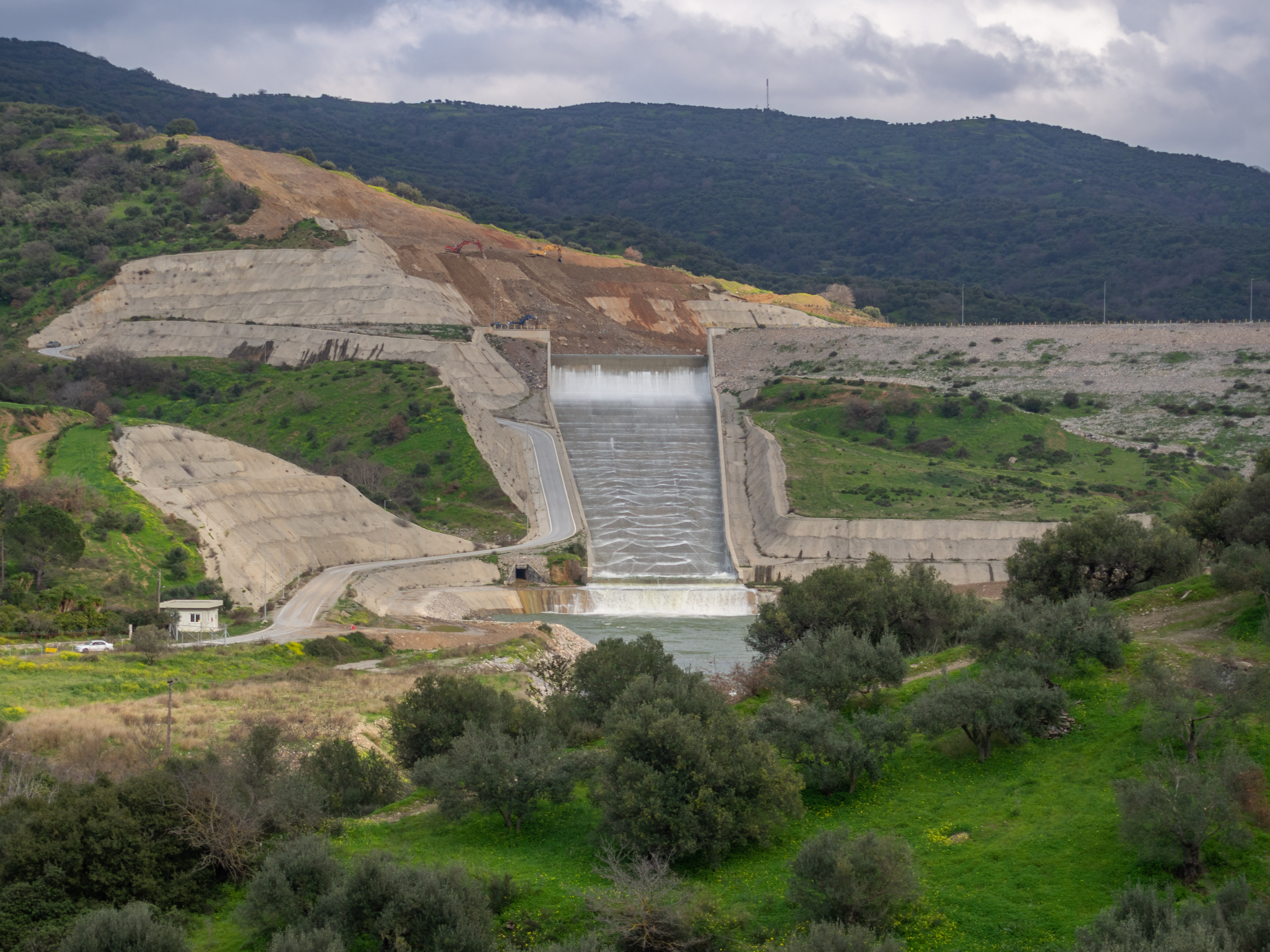
Aposelemis dam spillway

The first thoughts to build a dam for providing water from Aposelemis date back to the 1970s. During the 1980s and 90s several preparatory studies were completed and the definitive construction study was approved in 2000. Despite strong opposition by local communities in the early 2000s, the overwhelming need for water during the summer prevailed. The construction contract was put out to tender on 14/12/2004 and was awarded on 1/4/2005. Dam construction was completed in 2012 and accompanying works in early 2019. Total costs, including compensations for compulsory purchase, exceeded 220 million euros.

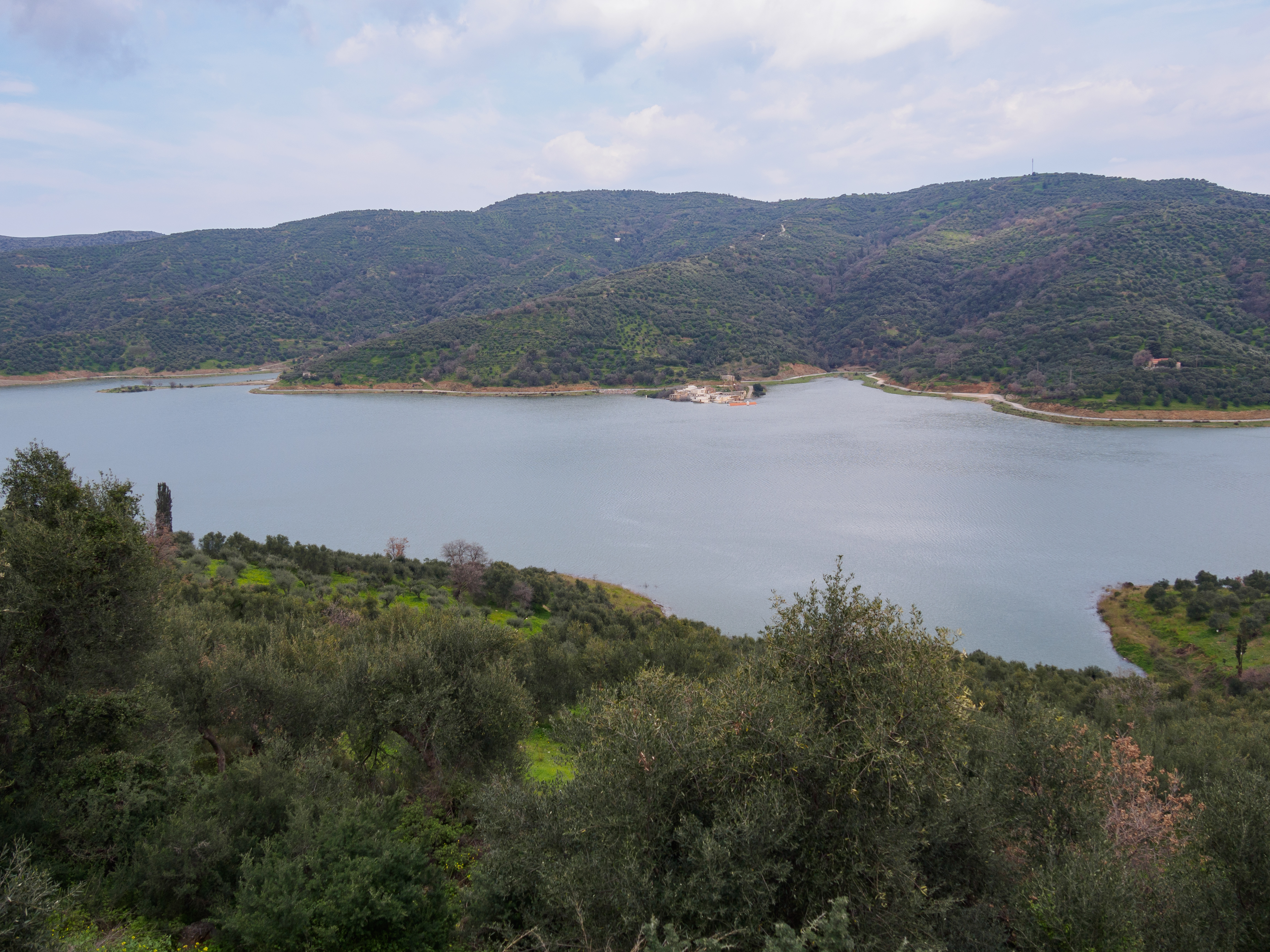
Aposelemis lake. Sfendyli can be seen in the middle

The hamlet of Sfendyli (Greek: Σφεντύλι) was located inside the dam reservoir and below the filling level, therefore it had to be abandoned. During the dry years that followed the dam completion, Sfendyli sunk and re-emerged several times, becoming a local attraction.

== Construction details ==
The Aposelemis dam is of rock-fill type with an impervious clay core. It is 61 metres (200 ft) tall, 660 metres (2,170 ft) long and is built on a phyllitic bedrock. The spillway is 231 m long with a maximum capacity of 1000 m3/sec. The reservoir has a normal volume of approx. 30 million cubic metres (7.9×10^{9} US gal) with a usable capacity of 27.3 million cubic metres (7.2×10^{9} US gal). In addition to the Aposelemis river, the reservoir receives supplemental water diverted from Lasithi Plateau via a steel piping in a 3.5 kilometres (2.2 mi) long bored tunnel with an inclination of 15%. Hence, the dam additionally serves flood control purposes. The reservoir has an area of 1.6 square kilometres (0.62 sq mi) and a combined drainage area of 143 square kilometres (55 sq mi). The dam overflowed for the first time in February 2019.

A water treatment plant with a daily capacity of 110.6 thousand cubic metres (29,200,000 US gal) provides drinking water to consumers via a system of water mains that is over 70 kilometres (43 mi) long.

== See also ==
- Lasithi Plateau
