= Limnakaro =

Plateau in Crete, Greece

Coordinates: 35°8′31.27″N 25°28′57.76″E

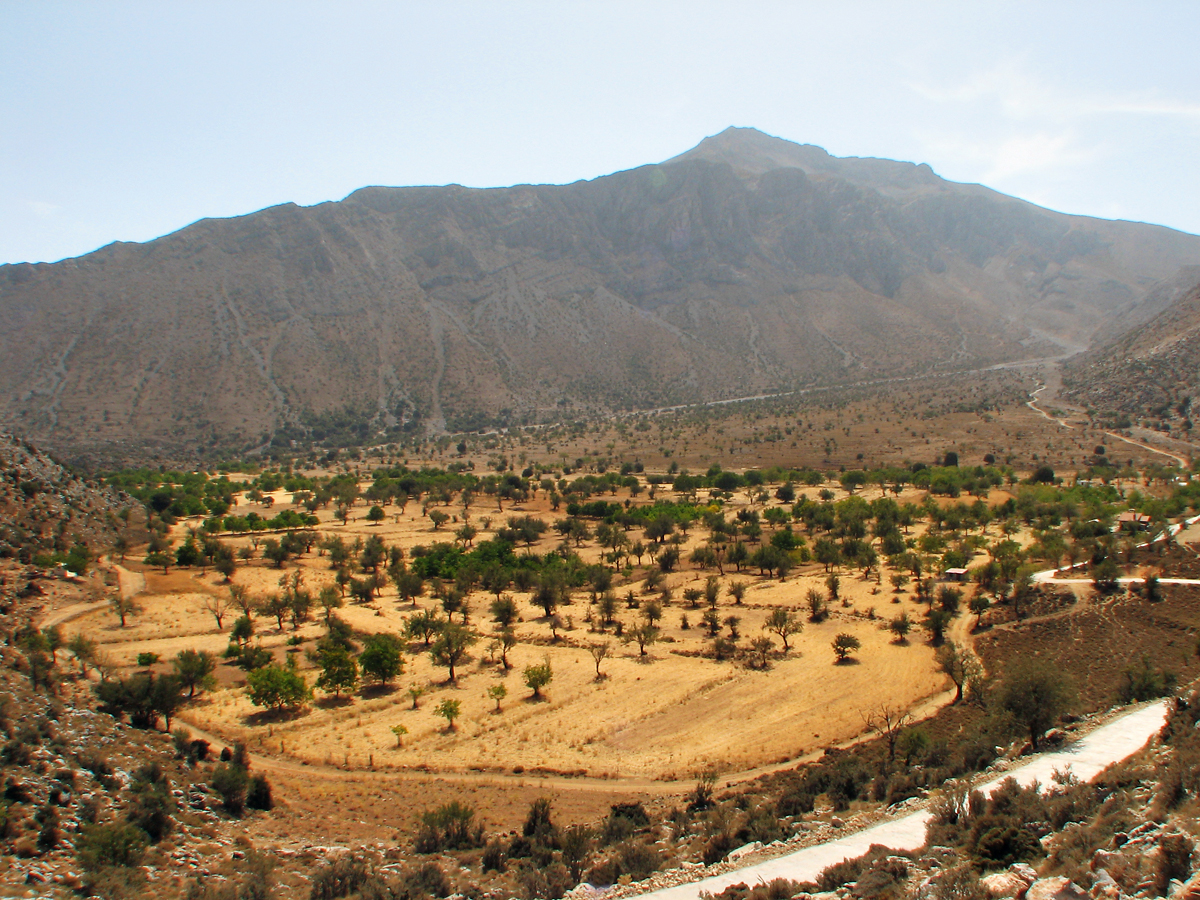
Late summer view of Limnakaro from the north.

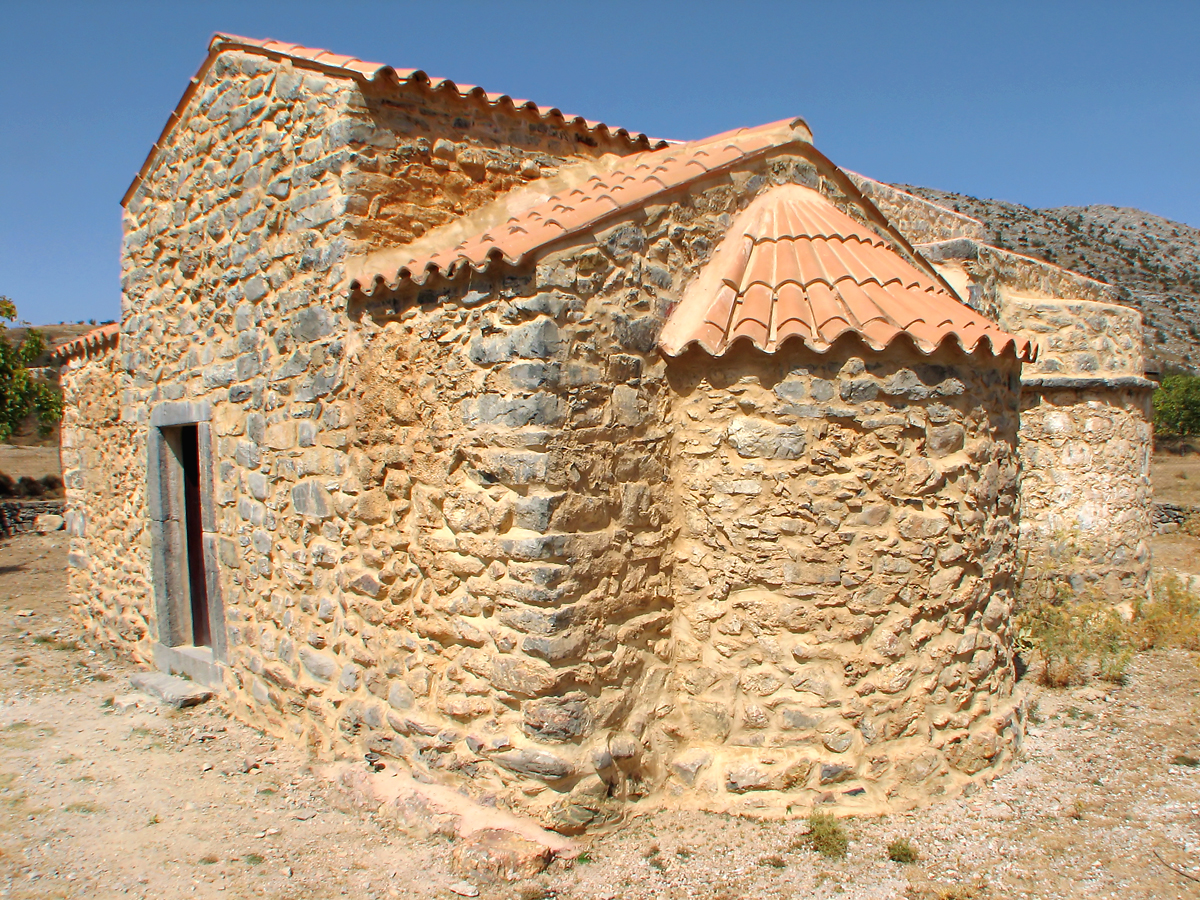
The Byzantine church of Agio Pnevma.

Limnakaro (Greek: Λιμνάκαρο) is a small (approx. 1000 m in the E-W direction and 600 m in the N-S) plateau located south of the Lasithi Plateau, near the villages of Avrakondes and Agios Georgios in eastern Crete, Greece. Limnakaro lies at about 1120 m above sea level, at the feet of the Spathi summit that rises to 2148 m. Because of its altitude, the plateau is mainly used as grazing grounds for sheep and goats. It has a rich wild flora and grows a number of walnut, pear, apple and chestnut trees. Despite a very small number of houses, there are no permanent residents at the plateau. At its western part there is a double nave church dedicated to the Holy Spirit (Agio Pnevma) that dates back to the second Byzantine period (i.e., 961-1204). The church was expanded in 1875 and has been recently restored. Limnakaro is on the European walking route E4; at a height of 1350m to its southwest in the Anestasi area there is a mountain shelter.

== See also ==
- Dikti
