= Dikti =

Mountain range of east Crete, Greece

Mount Dikti
- Spathi / Lasithiotika
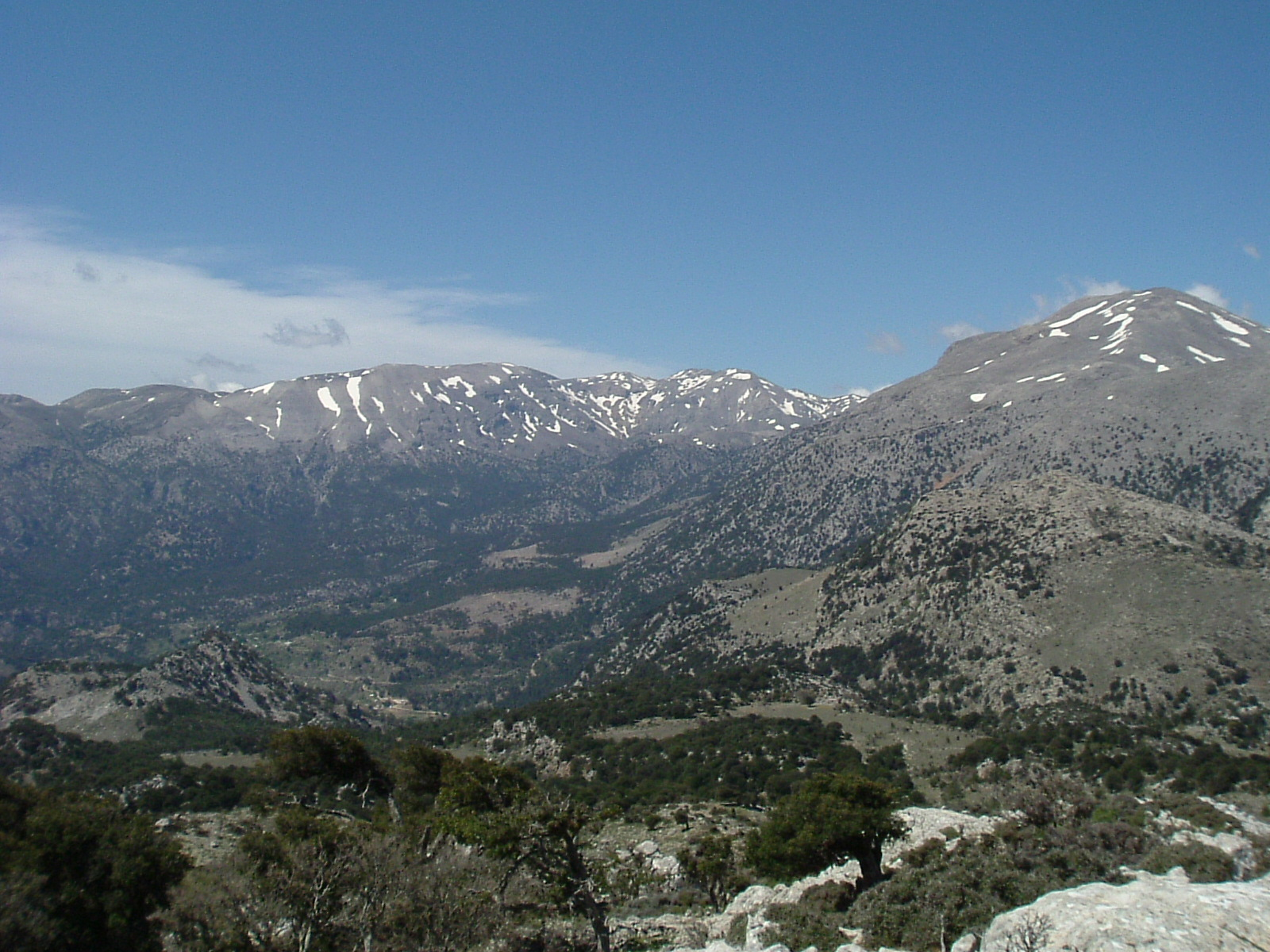
- Selakano valley surrounded by the main ridge of Dikti

Highest point
- Elevation: 2,148 m (7,047 ft)
- Prominence: 1,798 m (5,899 ft)
- Listing: Ultra
- Coordinates: 35°07′08″N 25°29′56″E

Geography
- Location within Greece
- Location: Island of Crete, Greece

Dikti or Dicte (Greek: Δίκτη) (also Lasithiotika Ori; Greek: Λασιθιώτικα Όρη "Lasithian Mountains"; anciently, Aigaion oros (Ancient Greek: Αἰγαῖον ὄρος) or Latin: Aegaeum mons) is a mountain range on the east of the island of Crete in the regional unit of Lasithi. On the west it extends to the regional unit of Heraklion. According to some versions of Greek mythology, Zeus was reared on this mountain in a cave called Dictaeon Antron (Psychro Cave). On the north of the main massif, the Lasithi Plateau is located. The topology of the mountain range is rich with plateaus (Lasithi, Katharo, Omalos Viannou, Limnakaro), valleys and secondary peaks. Some important peaks are Spathi (2,148 m) (the highest point), Afentis Christos/Psari Madara (2,141 m), Lazaros (2,085 m), Madara (1,783 m), Skafidaras (1,673 m), Katharo Tsivi (1,665 m), Sarakino (1,588 m), Afentis (1,571 m), Selena (1,559 m), Varsami (1,545 m), Toumpa Moutsounas (1,538 m), Platia Korfi (1,489 m), Mahairas (1,487 m), Virgiomeno Oros (1,414 m). The main massif forms a horseshoe around the valley of Selakano. Large parts of the mountain area, including the Selakano valley, are forested with pines (Pinus brutia), Kermes oaks (Quercus coccifera), cypresses (Cupressus sempervirens), holm oaks (Quercus ilex) and Cretan Maples (Acer sempervirens). The fertile valleys and plateaus of Dikti/Dicte are of significant importance in the local economy.

The dominant feature of Dikti is the Lasithi Plateau, the largest plateau in Crete. It is a place with a long history. Diktaion Antron, is located here, a cave in which — according to one legend — Zeus was born.

== Gallery ==
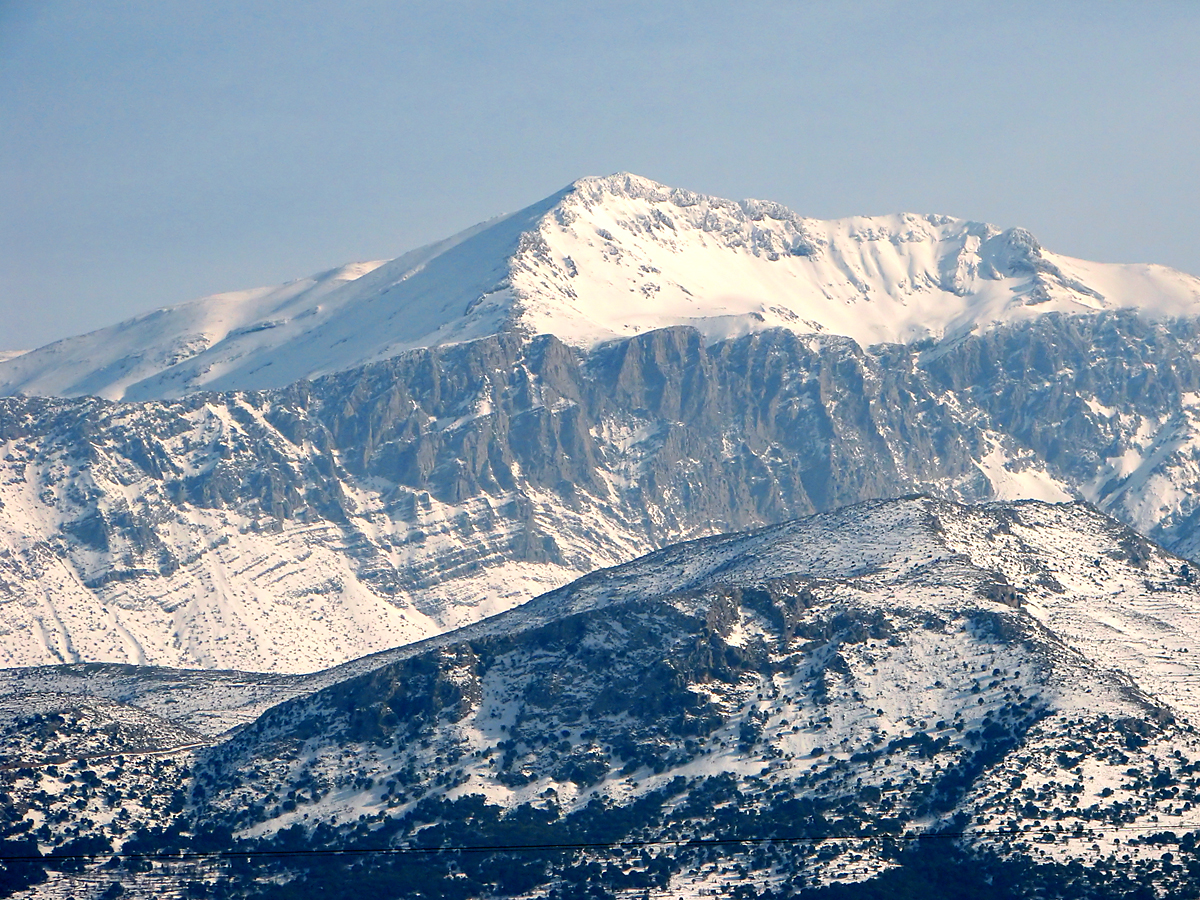
Spathi summit

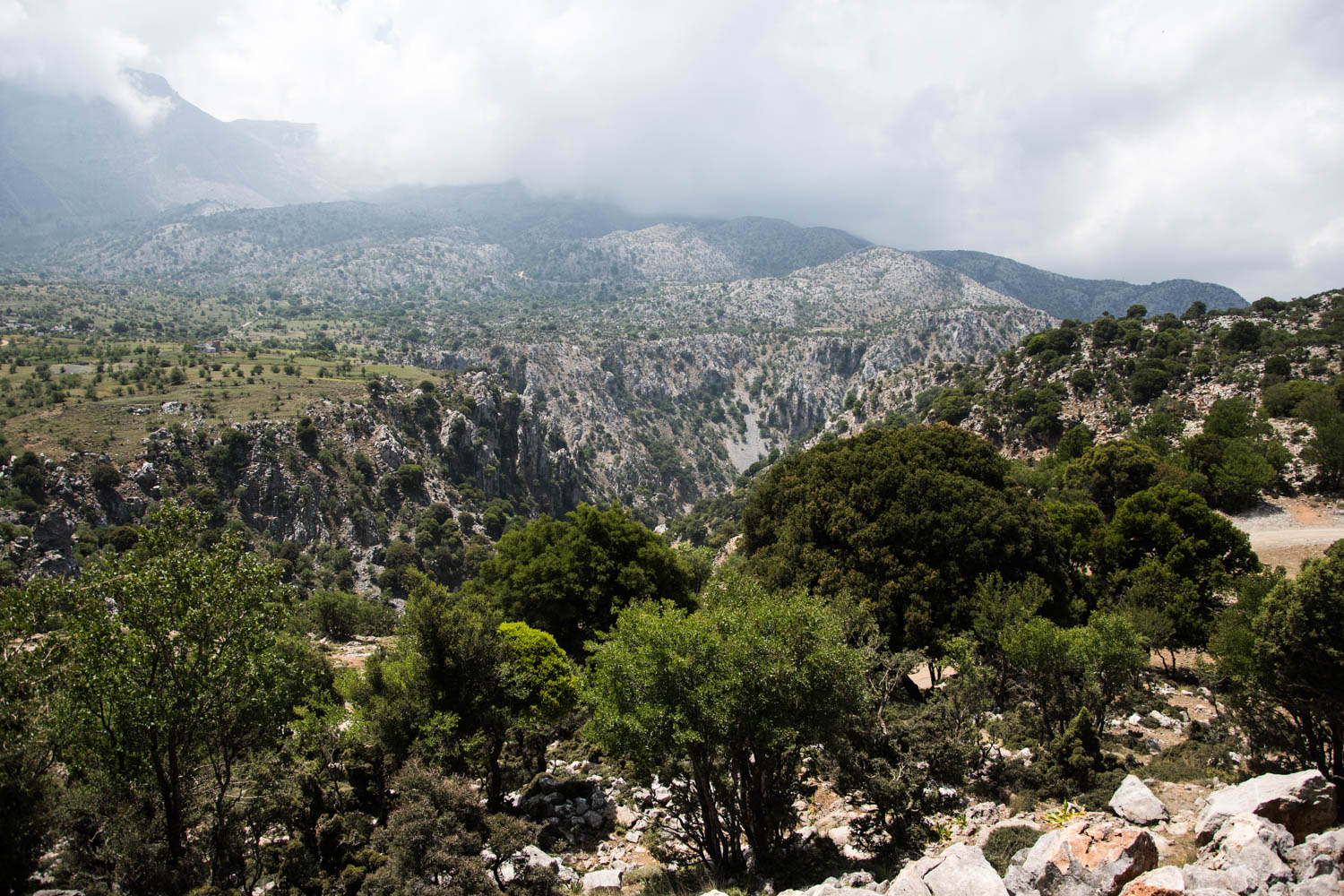
View of gorge in Dikti

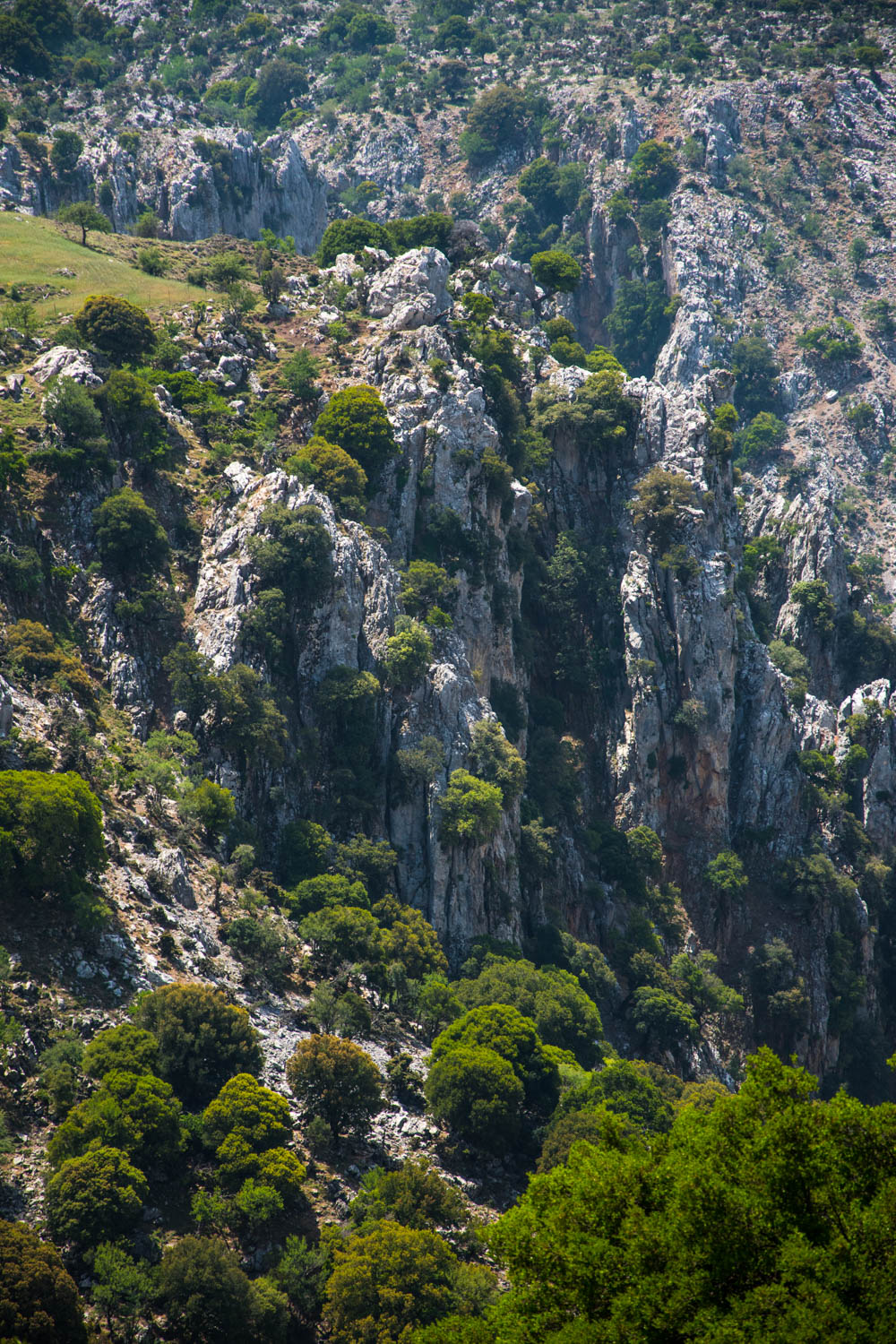
View of gorge in Dikti

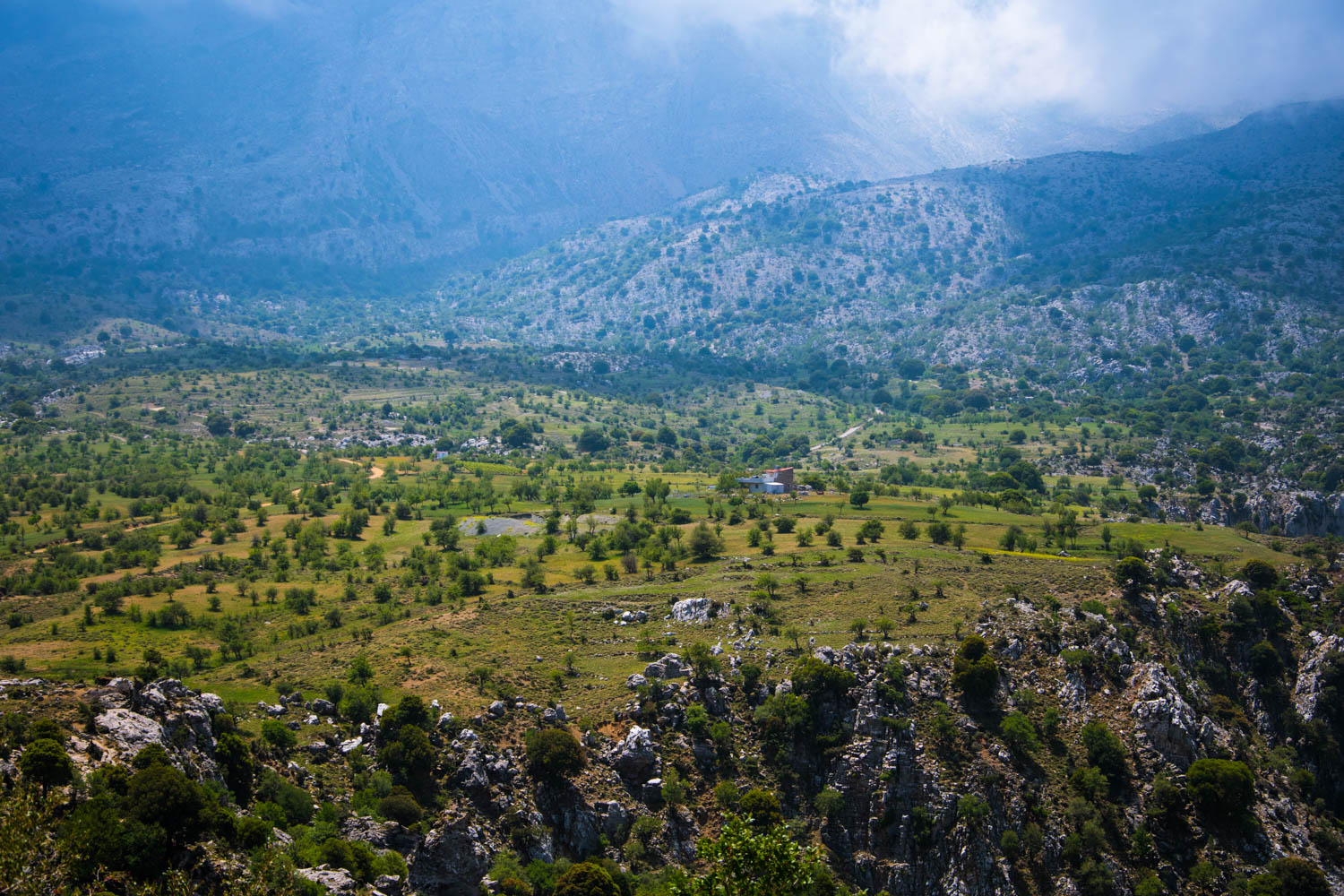
View of Lasithi plateau

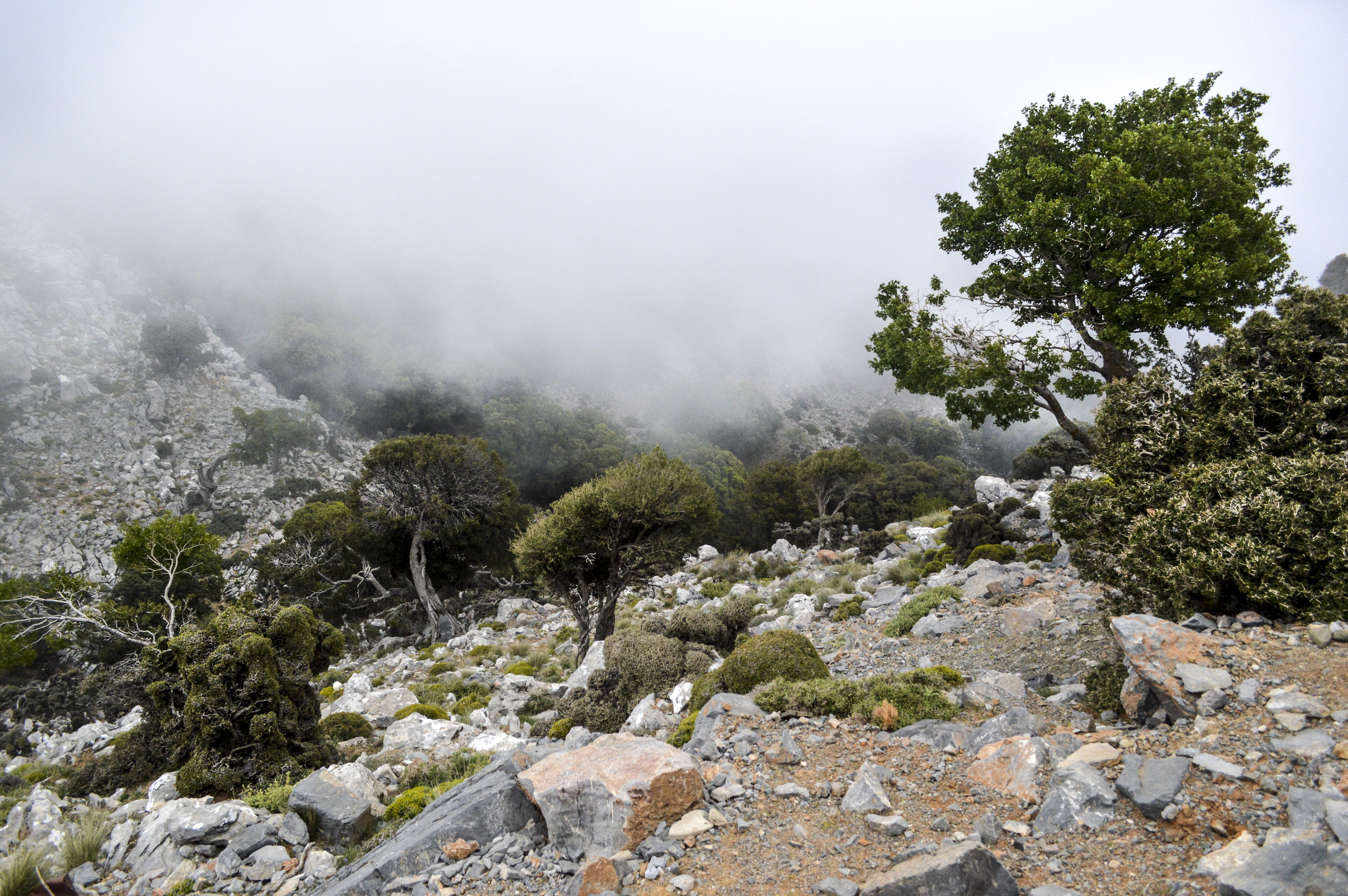
Landscape in Katharo plateau

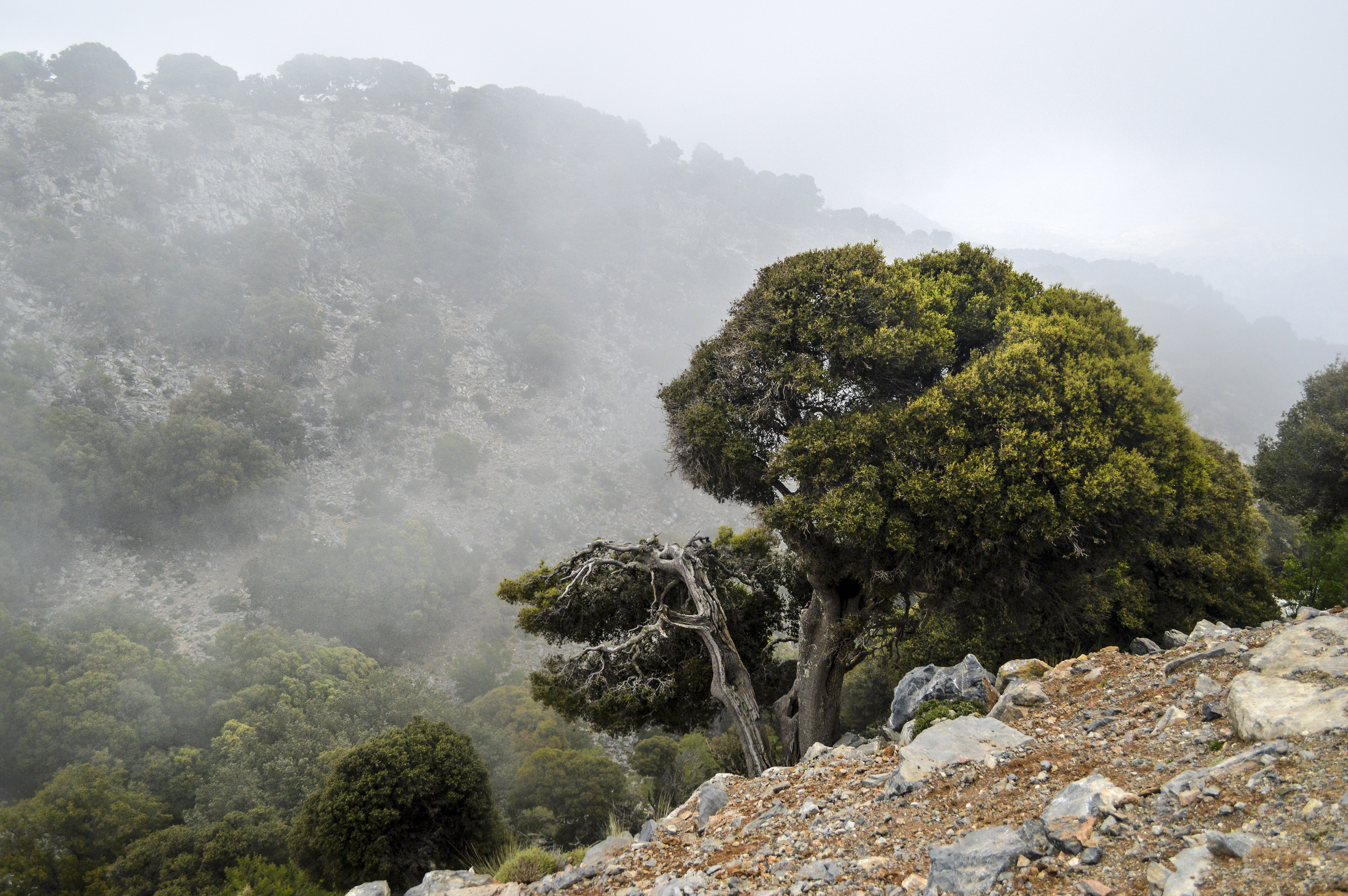
Landscape in Katharo plateau

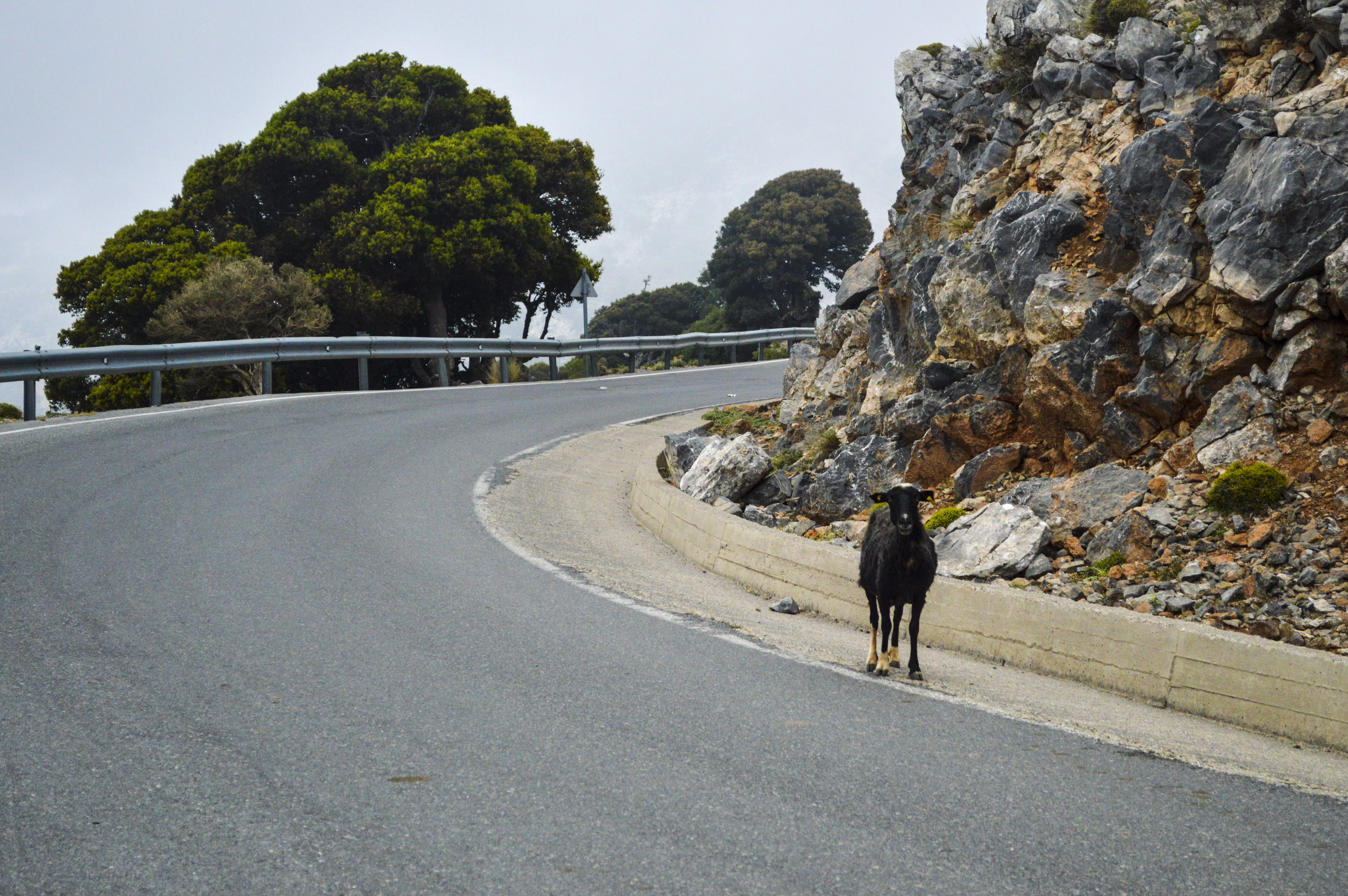
Road in Katharo

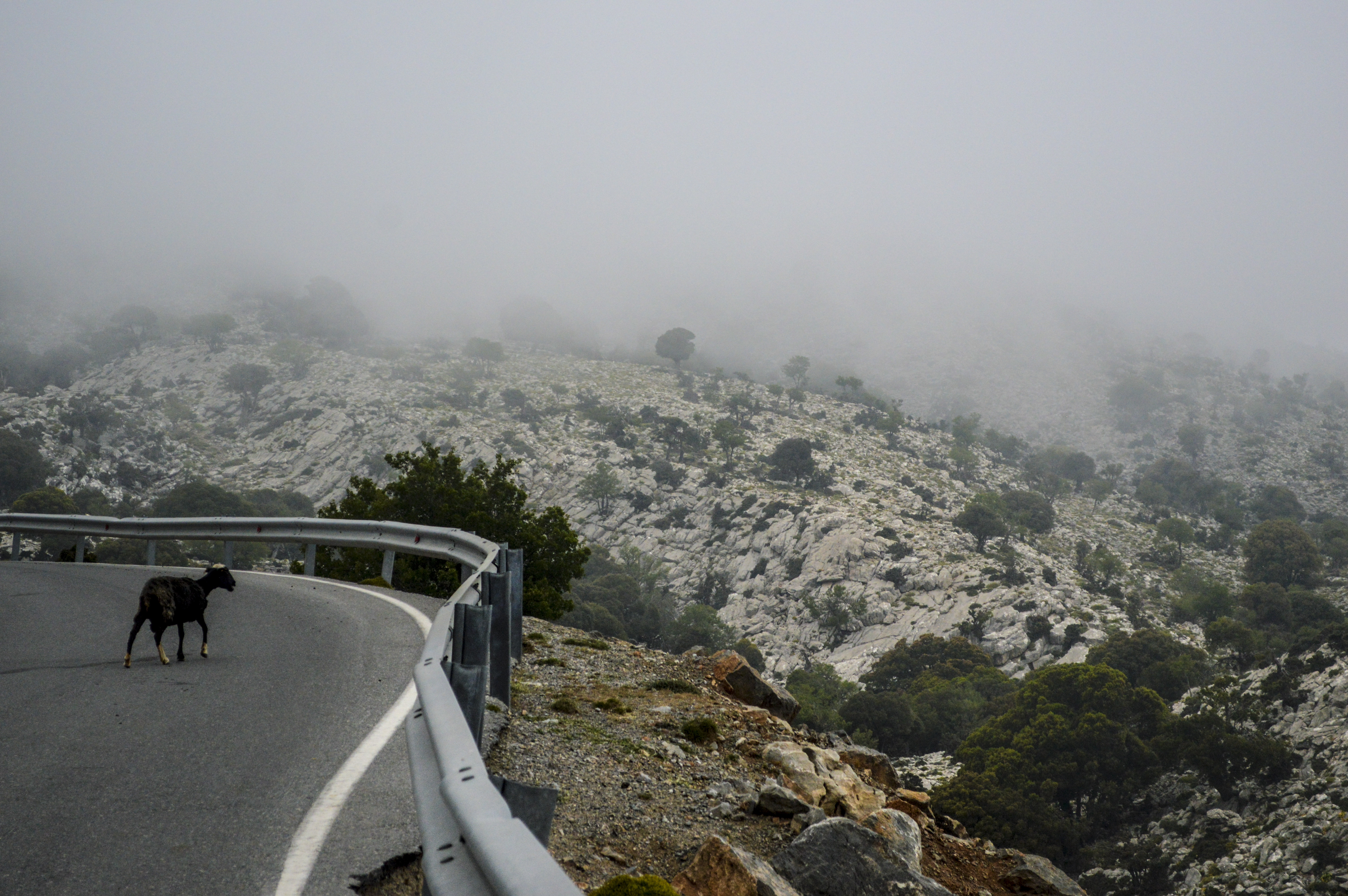
Road in Katharo

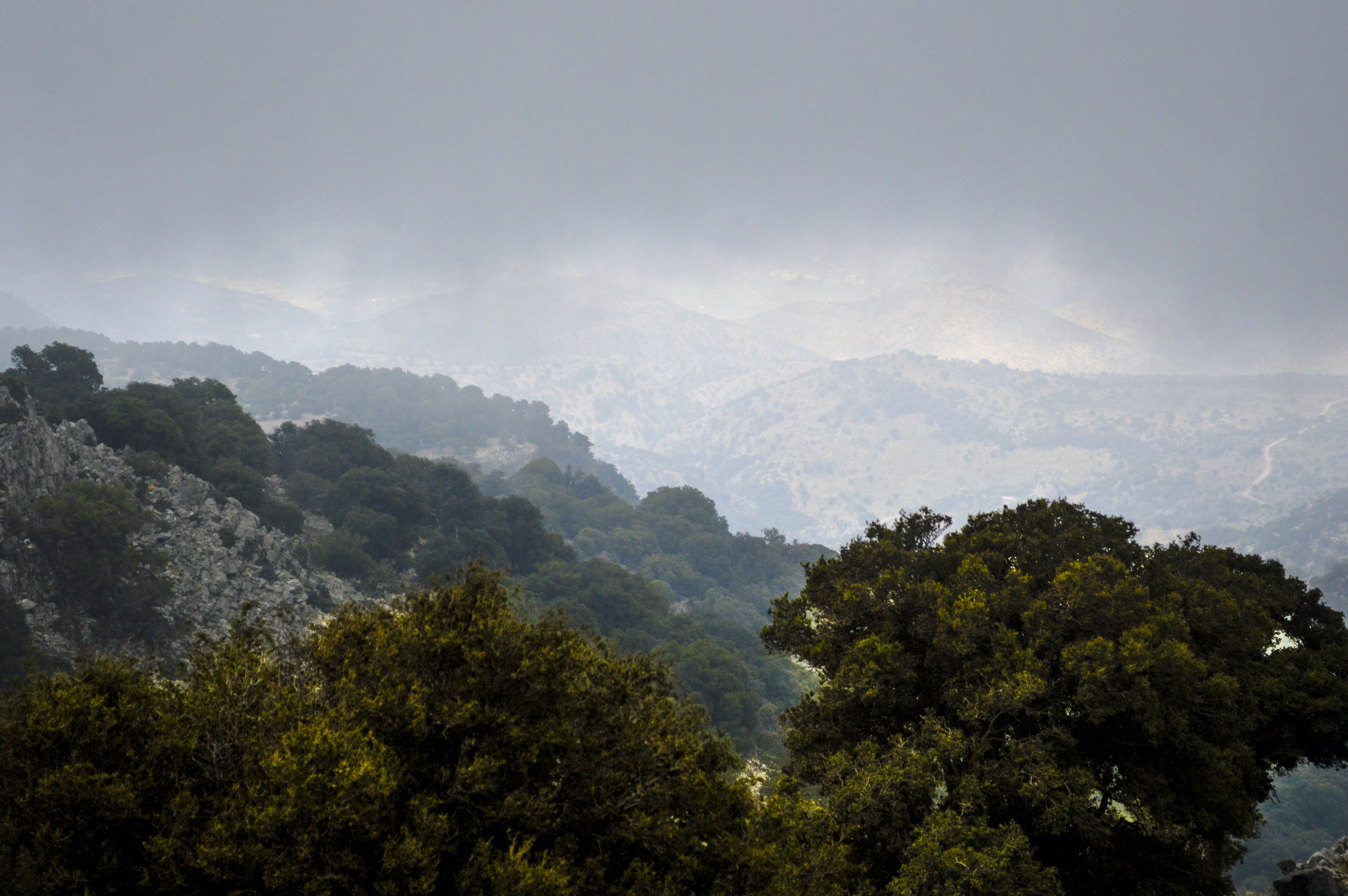
View of Katharo plateau

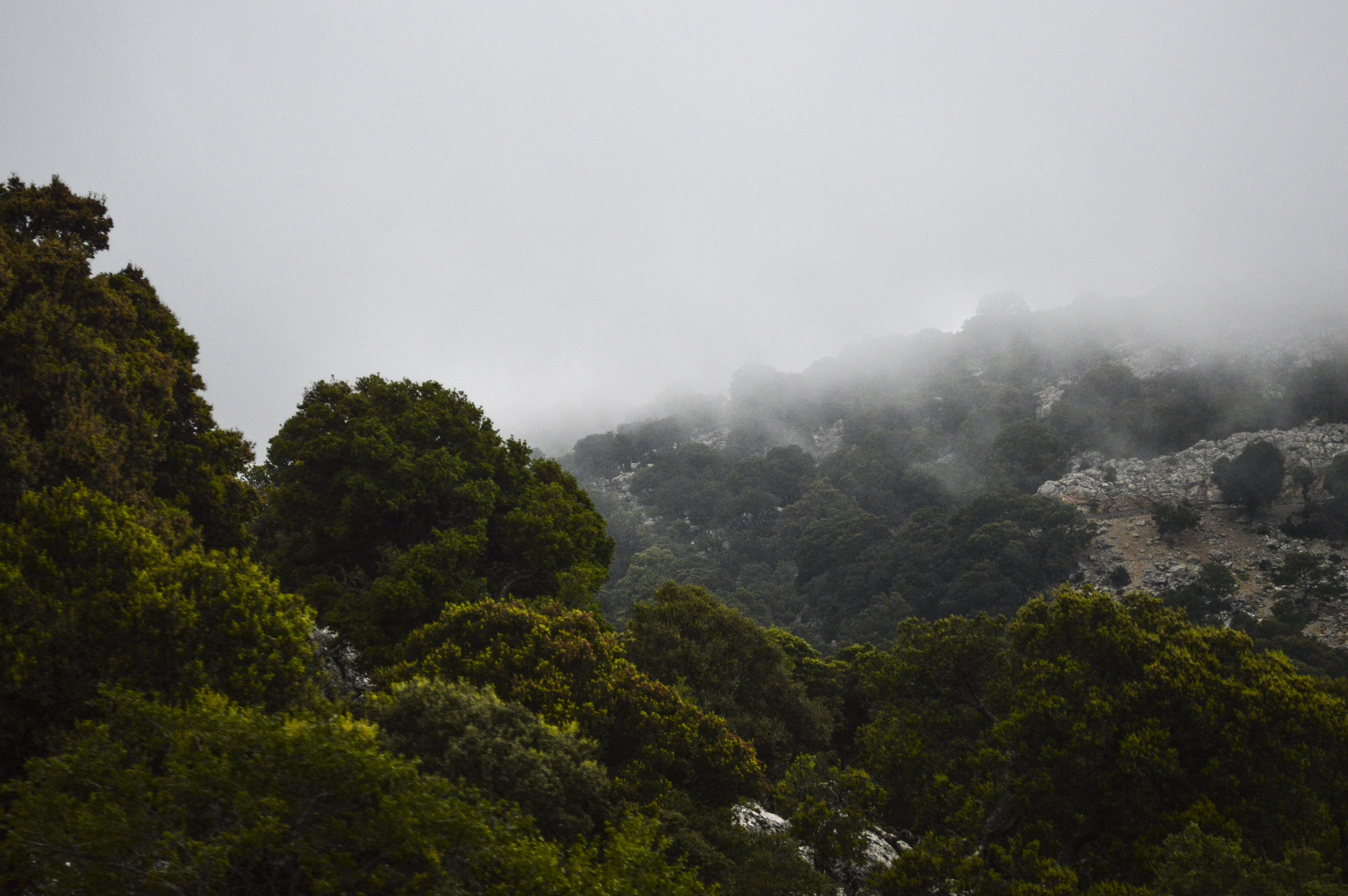
Landscape in Katharo plateau

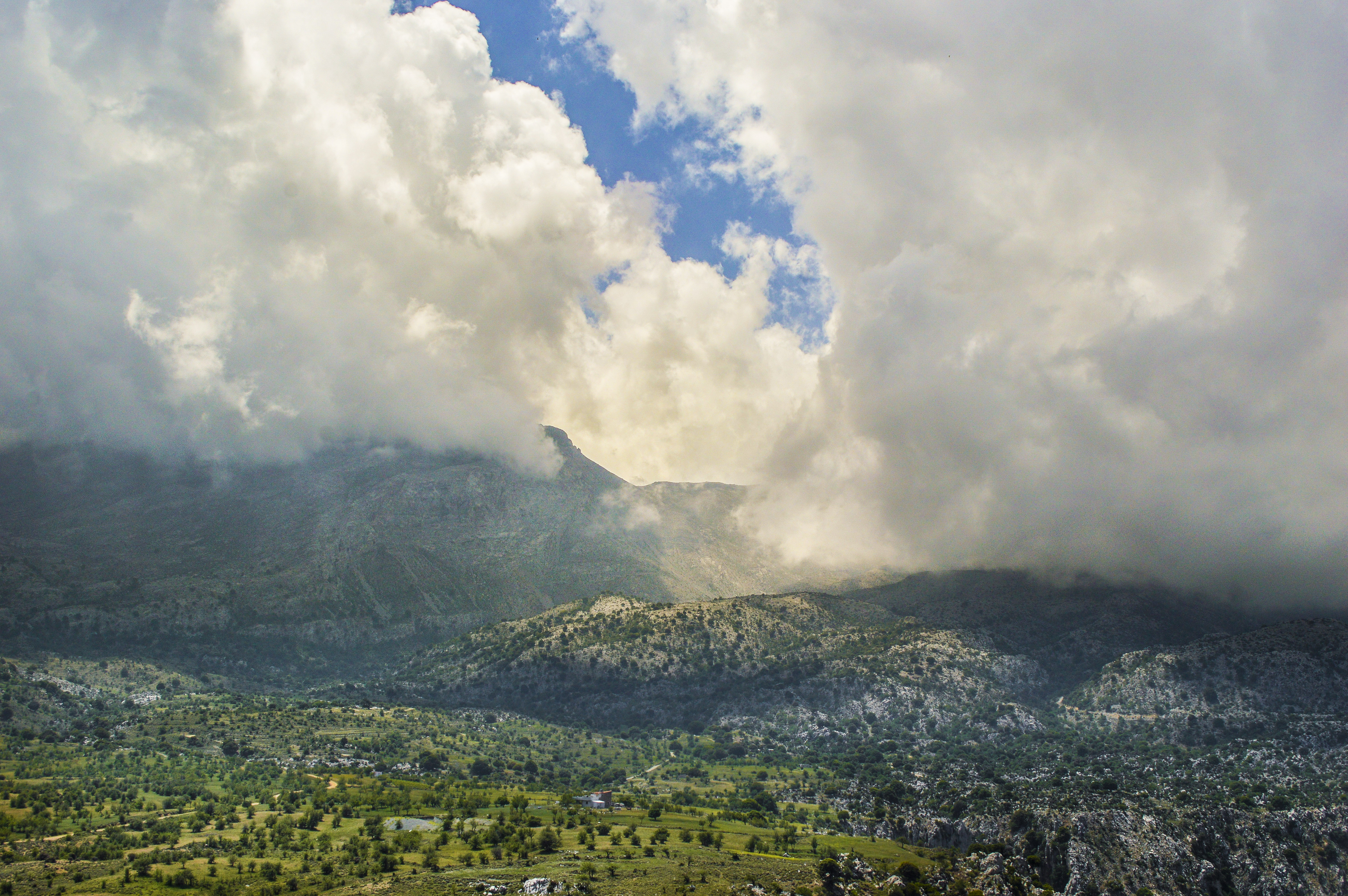
View of Katharo

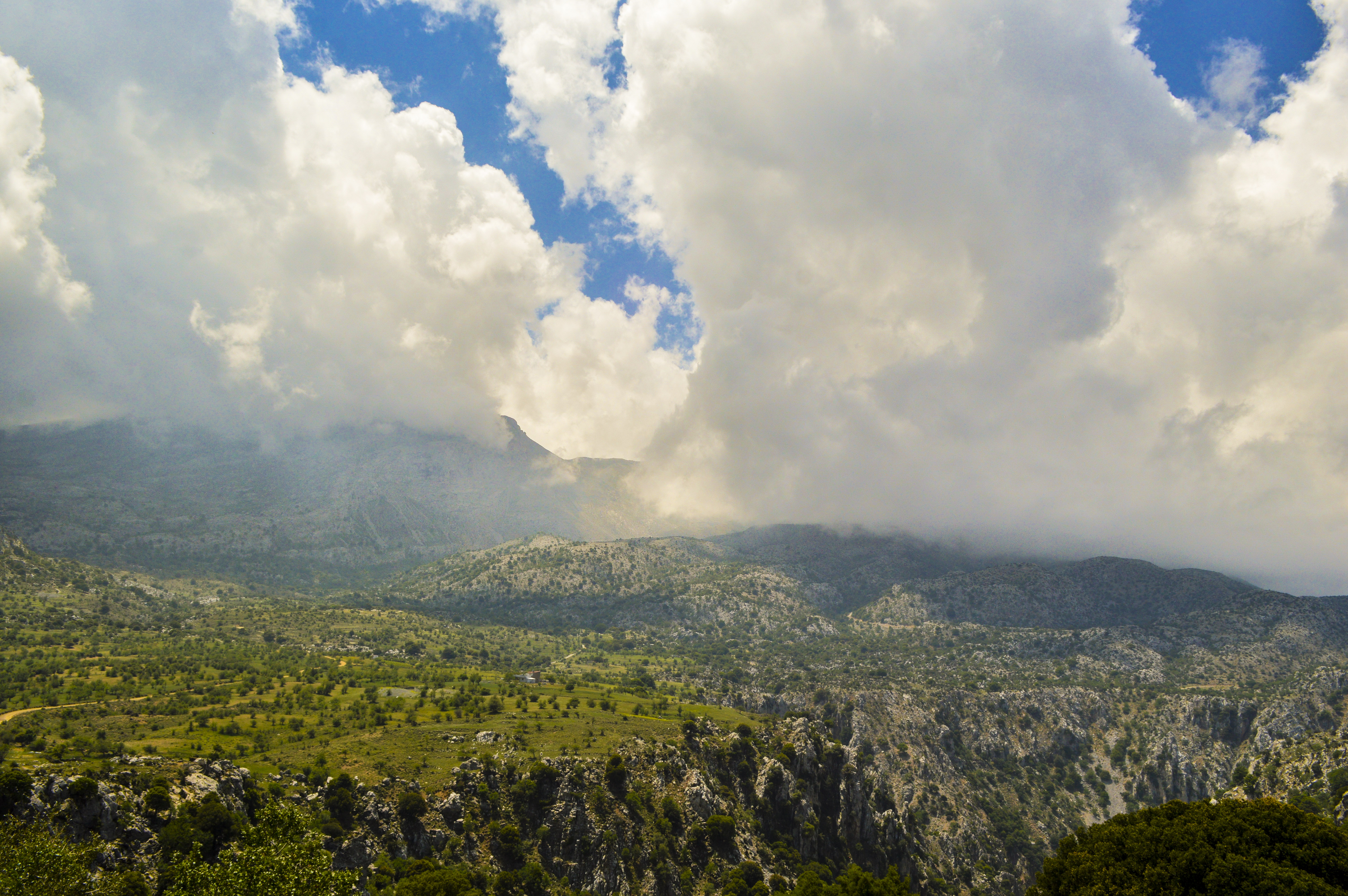
View of Katharo

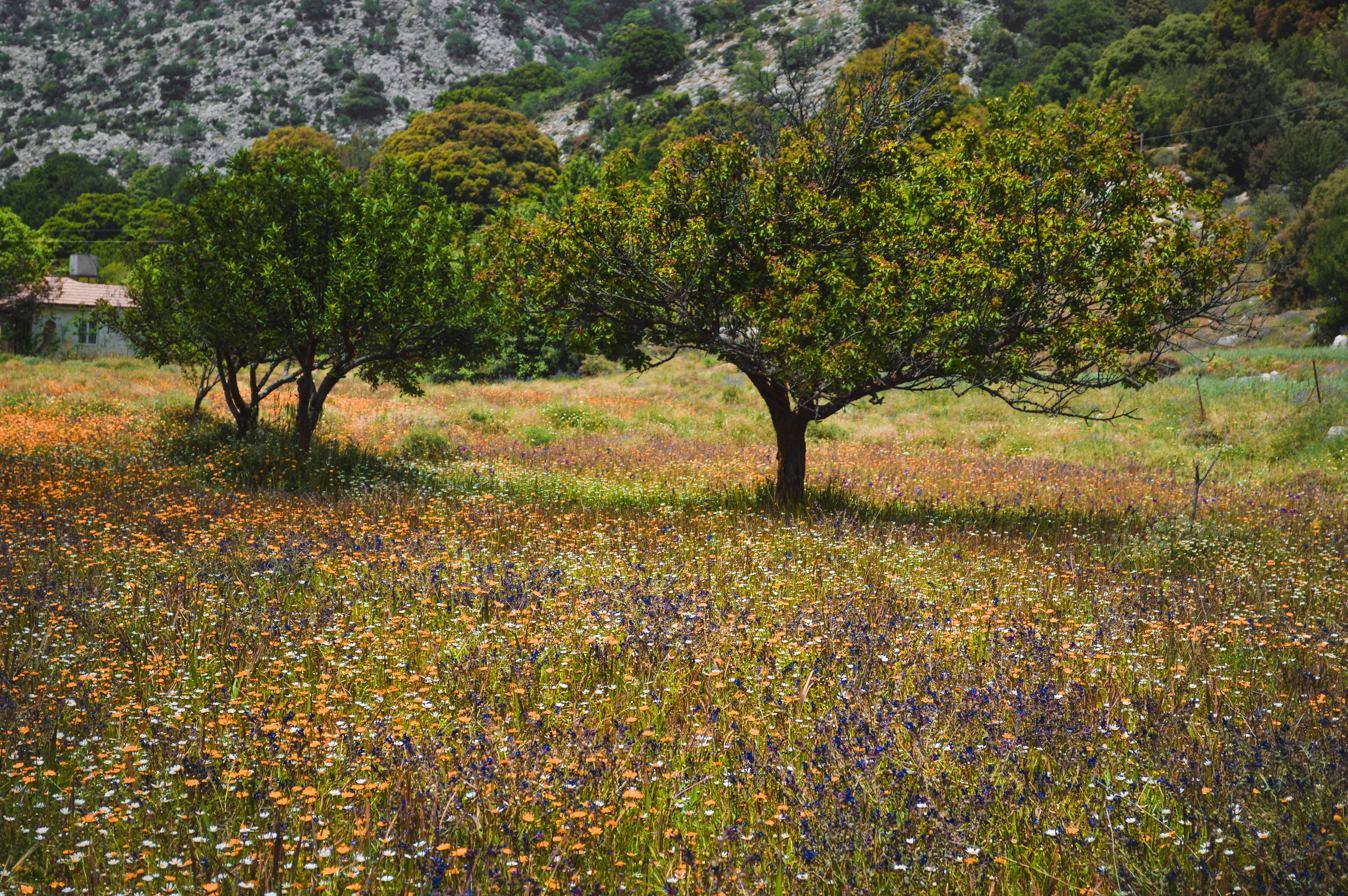
Landscape in Katharo plateau

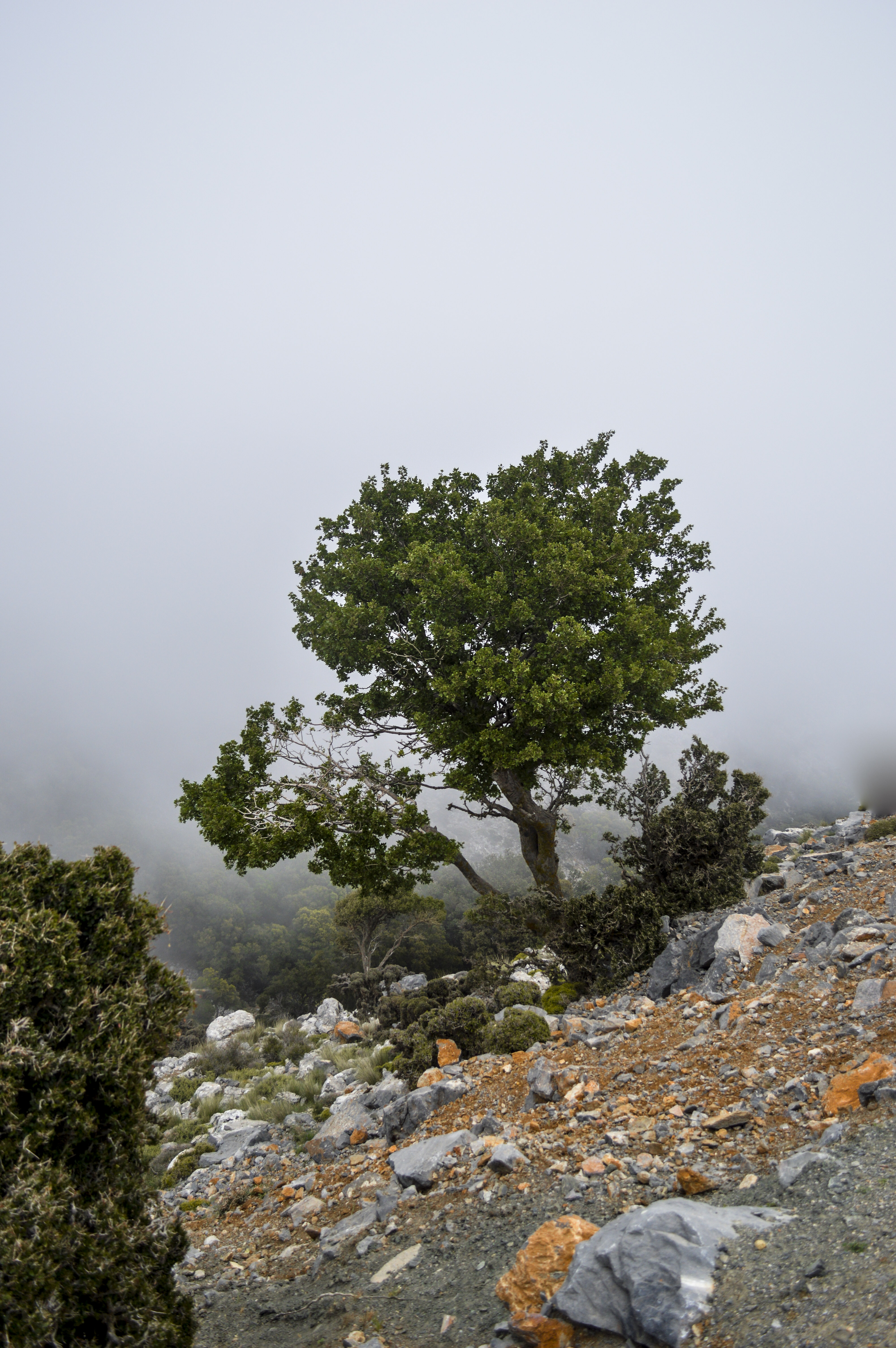
Tree in Katharo plateau

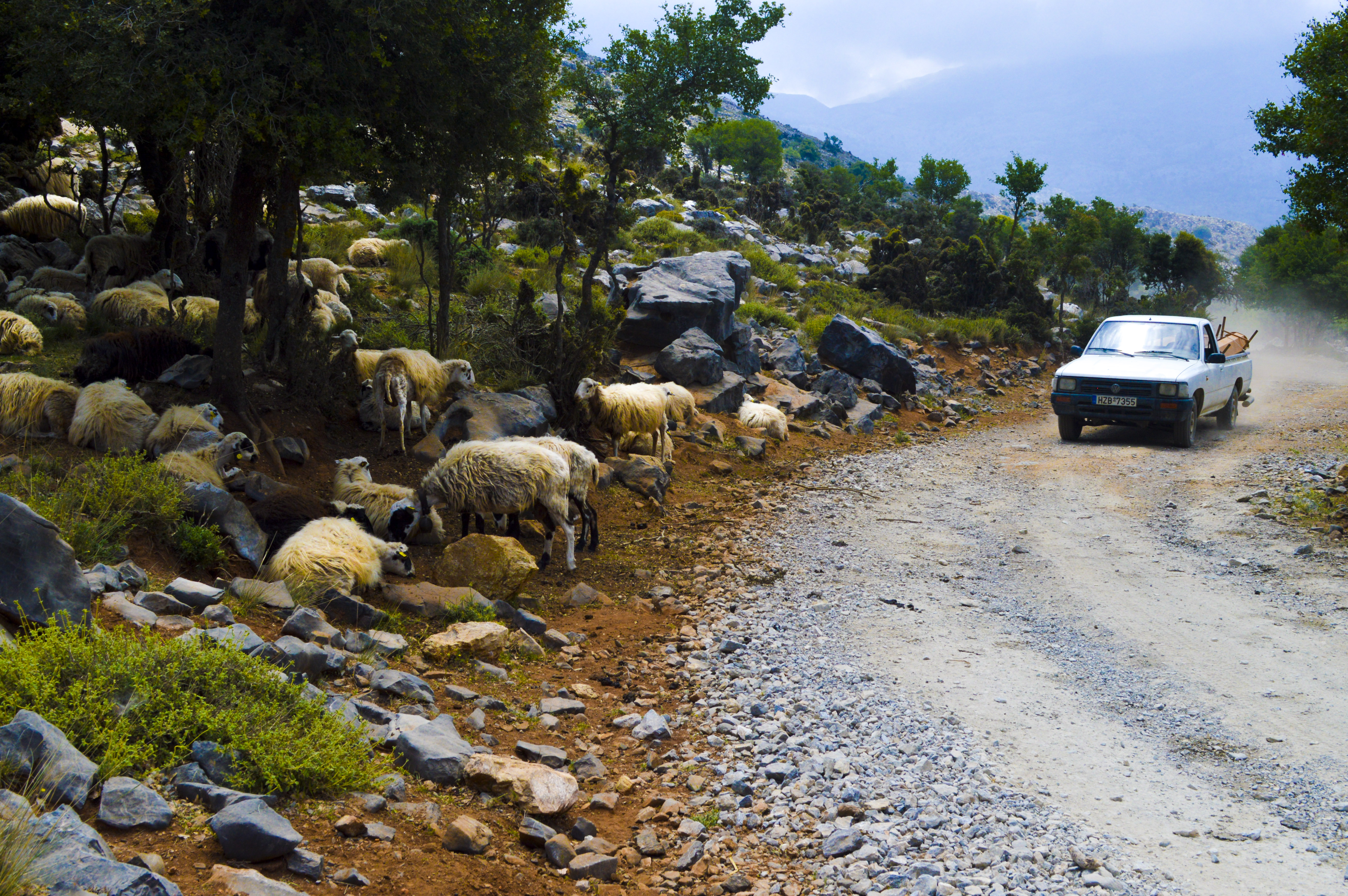
A flock of sheep in Dikti

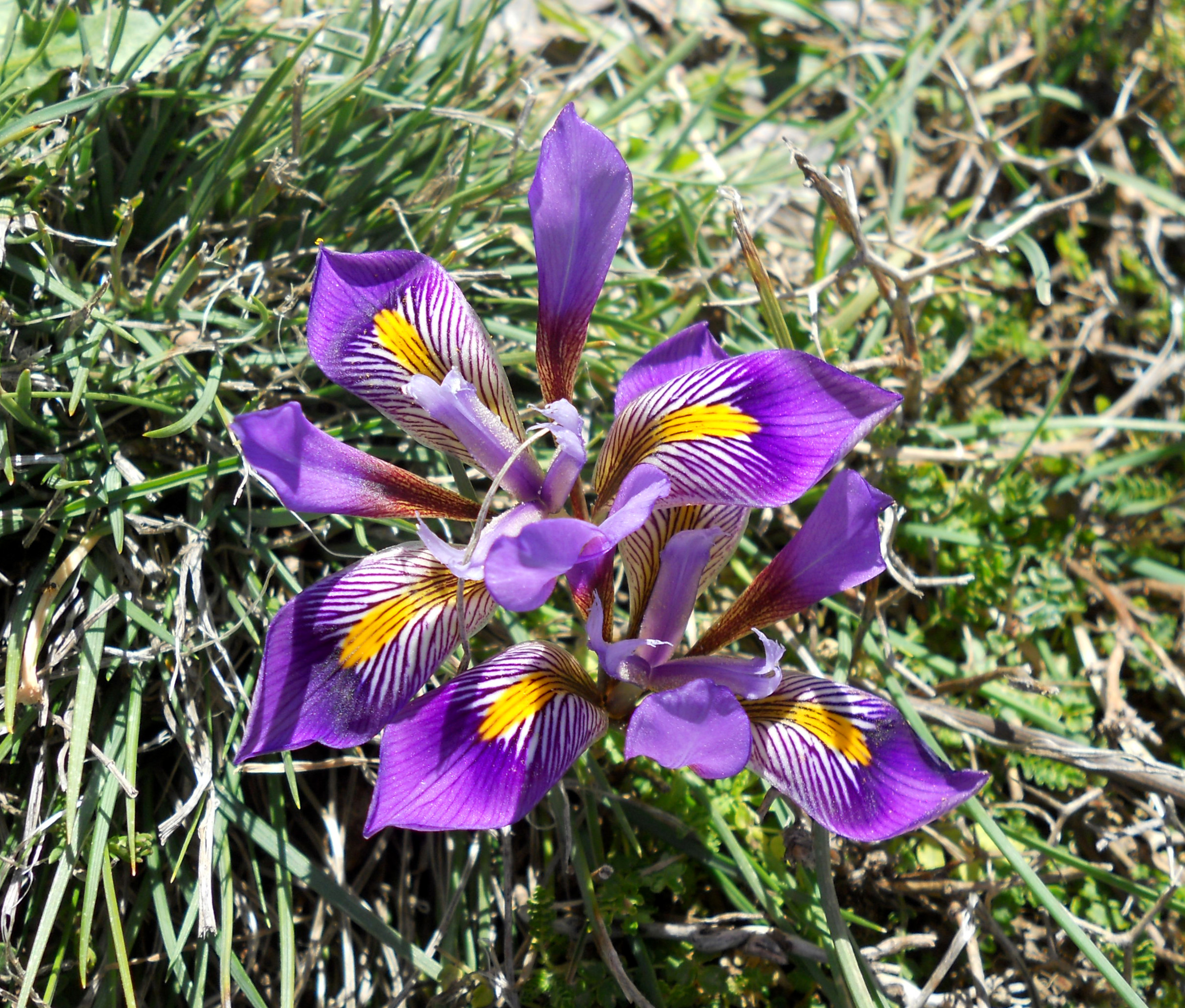
Iris cretensis

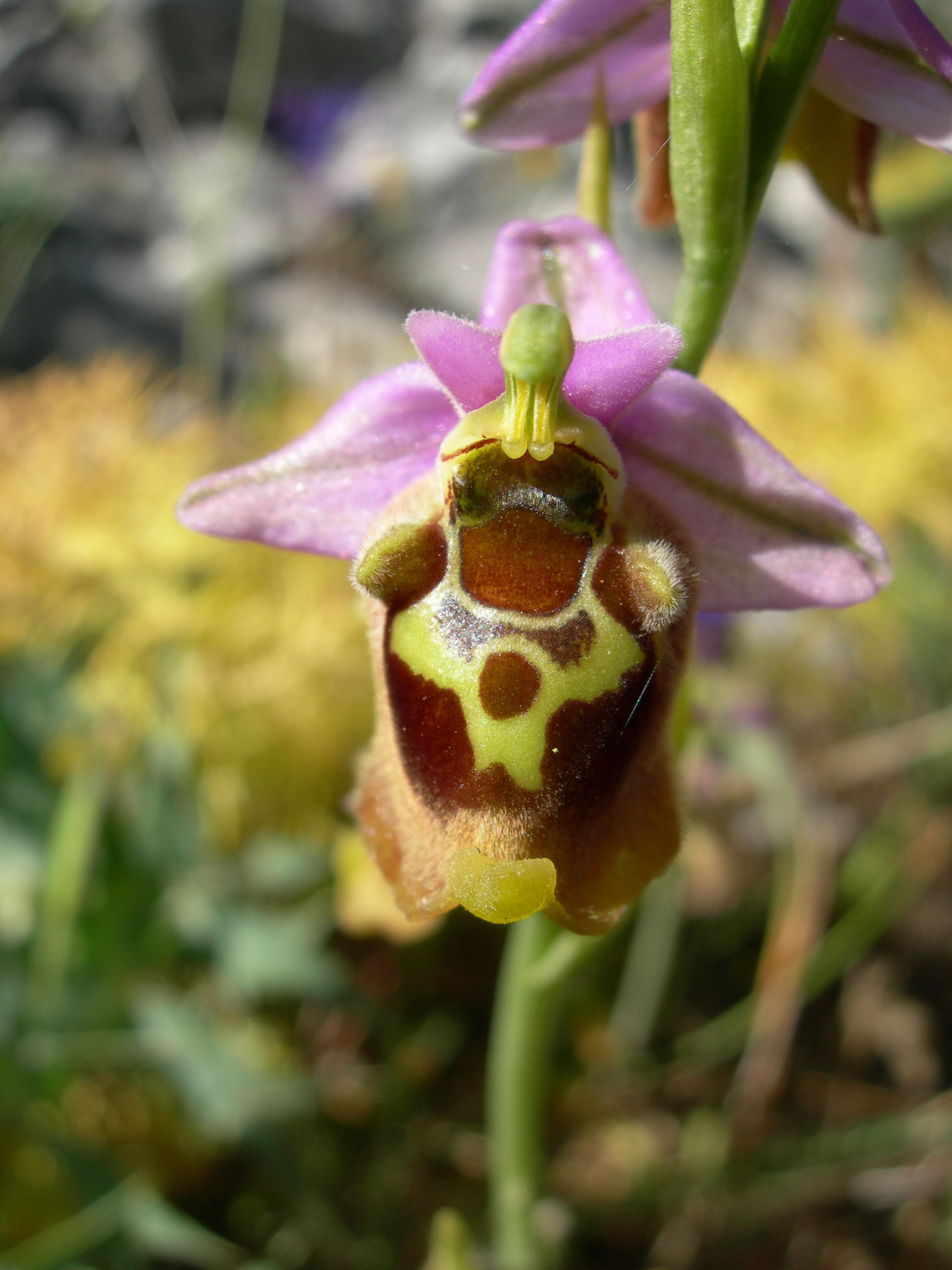
Ophrys episcopalis

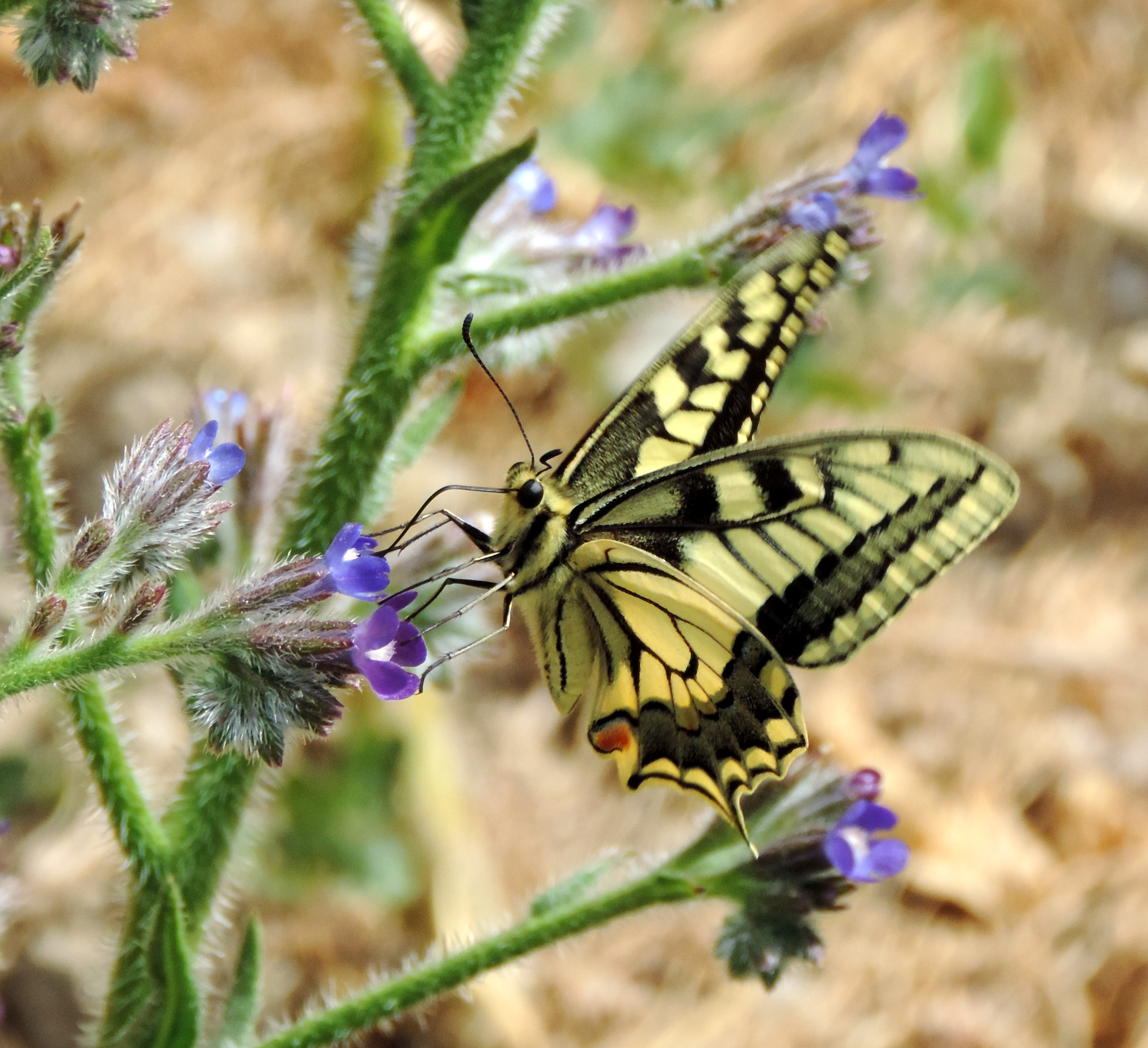
Papilio machaon on Anchusa azurea

== See also ==
- Britomartis
- Diktynna
- Dittany
