= Agios Georgios (refugee settlement) =

Refugee camp in Cyprus

Agios Georgios is a refugee settlement in Larnaca, Cyprus, established as a consequence of the 1974 Turkish invasion of Cyprus.

It is noted on some maps as Government Housing Estate for Refugees "Agios Georgios". It is located north of Agriniou Street.

There are other locations in the same city that are known as Agios Georgios. One is the location where a tomb was discovered in 1979 at Mnemata, and since then has been referred to as Agios Georgios cemetery. Another is the cemetery on Agiou Georgiou Kontou Street. (An "Ancient Kition" text on a roadsign, points toward this cemetery.)

== History ==
The agency responsible for building this settlement (and others), was the Town Planning and Housing Department. Construction of a settlement started at Mnemata. Archaeological excavations were conducted, after a tomb was discovered. (The Mnemata Site has become the name of the excavation site.) Construction of the refugee settlement was ordered cancelled—at Mnemata. The settlement—still named Agios Georgios—was built north of Agriniou Street.
