= MV Agios Georgios =

A number of motor vessels have been named Agios Georgios, including:

- MV Agios Georgios (1941), a coaster built as Empire Ford
- MV Agios Georgios (1972), a ro-ro ferry
