= Lasithi Plateau =

Municipality in Crete, Greece

Oropedio Lasithiou Οροπέδιο Λασιθίου
- Municipality
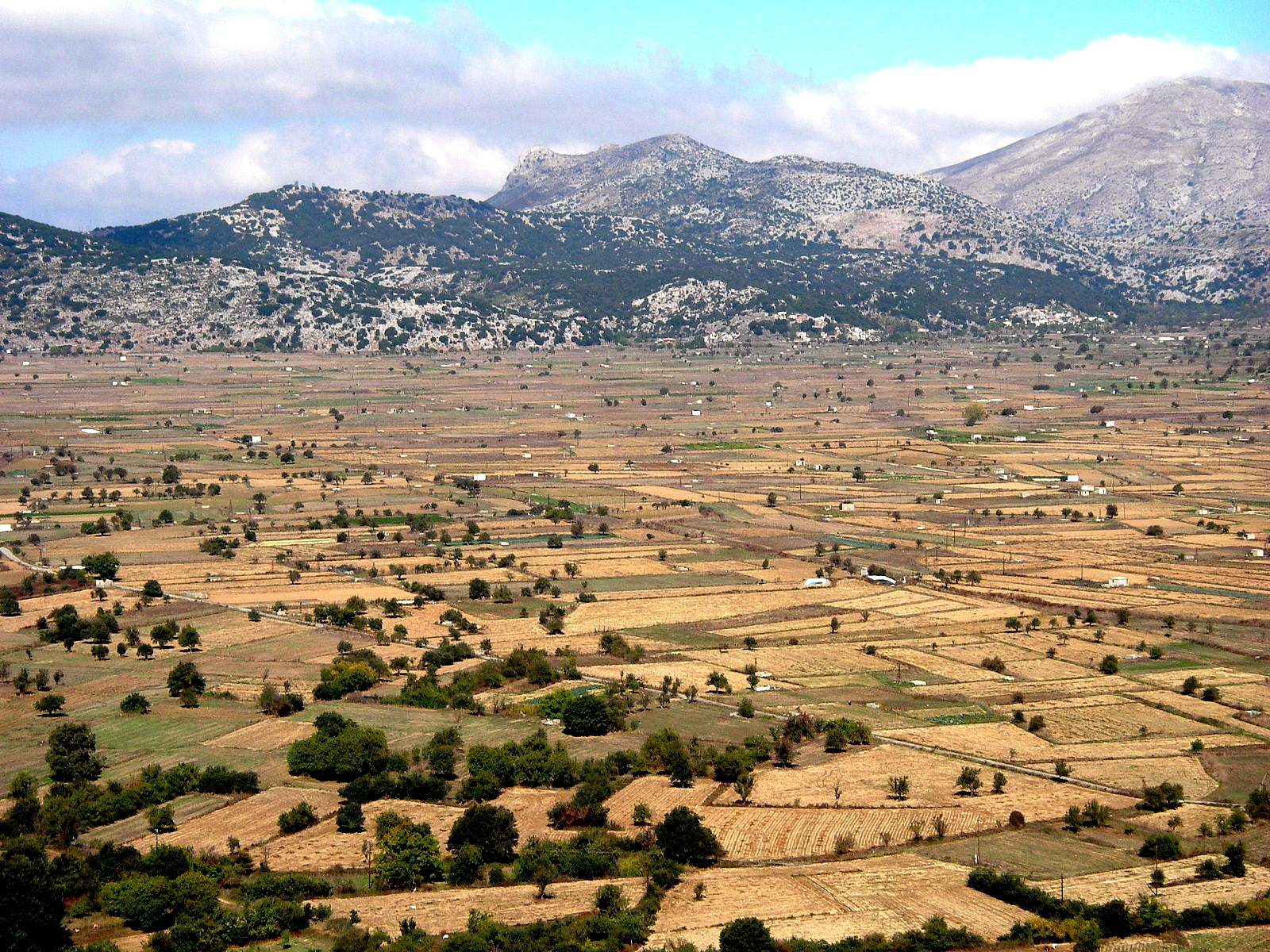
- Panorama of the Lasithi Plateau

- Seal

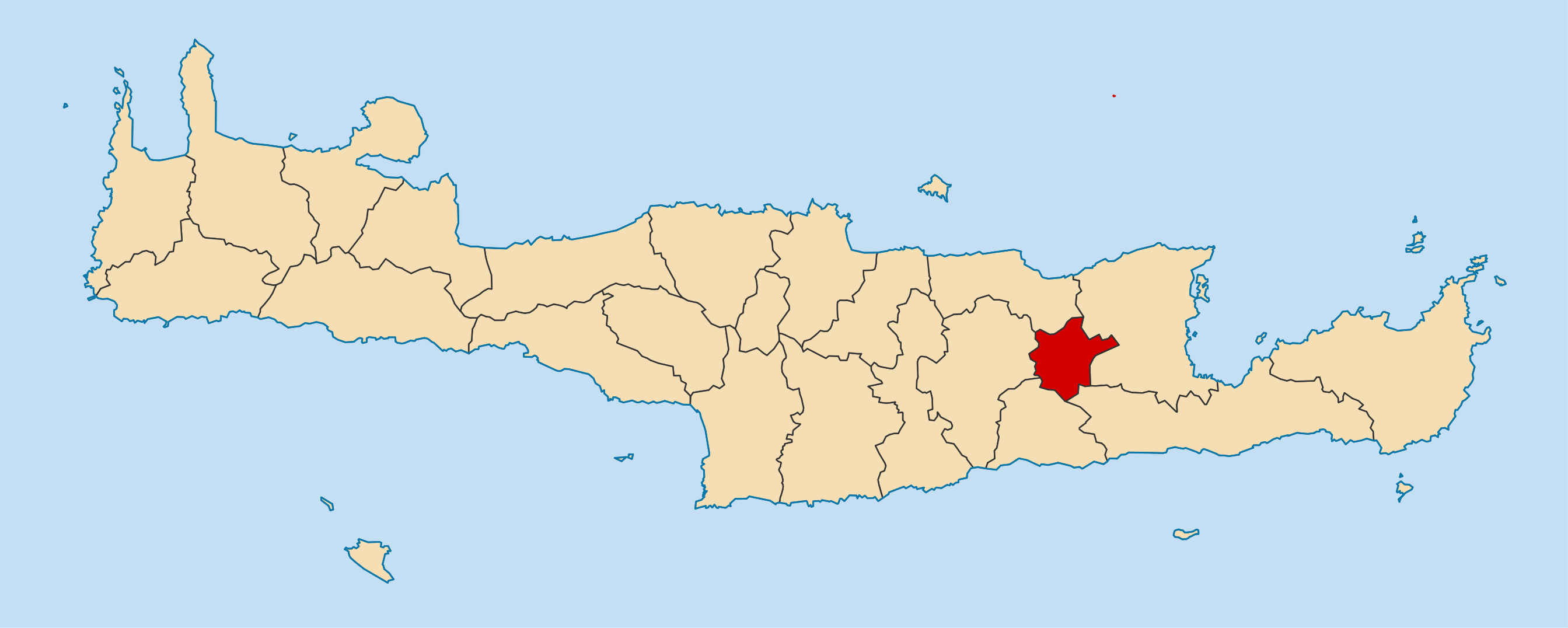

- Location within Greece
- Coordinates: 35°11′N 25°28′E
- Country: Greece
- Administrative region: Crete
- Regional unit: Lasithi
- Seat: Tzermiado

Area
  - Municipality: 130.0 km^{2} (50.2 sq mi)

Population (2021)
  - Municipality: 2,258
  - Density: 17.37/km^{2} (44.99/sq mi)
- Time zone: UTC+2 (EET)
  - Summer (DST): UTC+3 (EEST)
- Vehicle registration: AN
- Website: Oropedio.gr

The Lasithi Plateau (Greek: Οροπέδιο Λασιθίου, Oropedio Lasithiou) is a high endorheic plateau, located in the Lasithi regional unit in eastern Crete, Greece. Since the 1997 Kapodistrias reform, it is a municipality whose seat is Tzermiado and the second biggest village is Agios Georgios. The municipality has an area of 129.9 km2 ².

== Geography ==
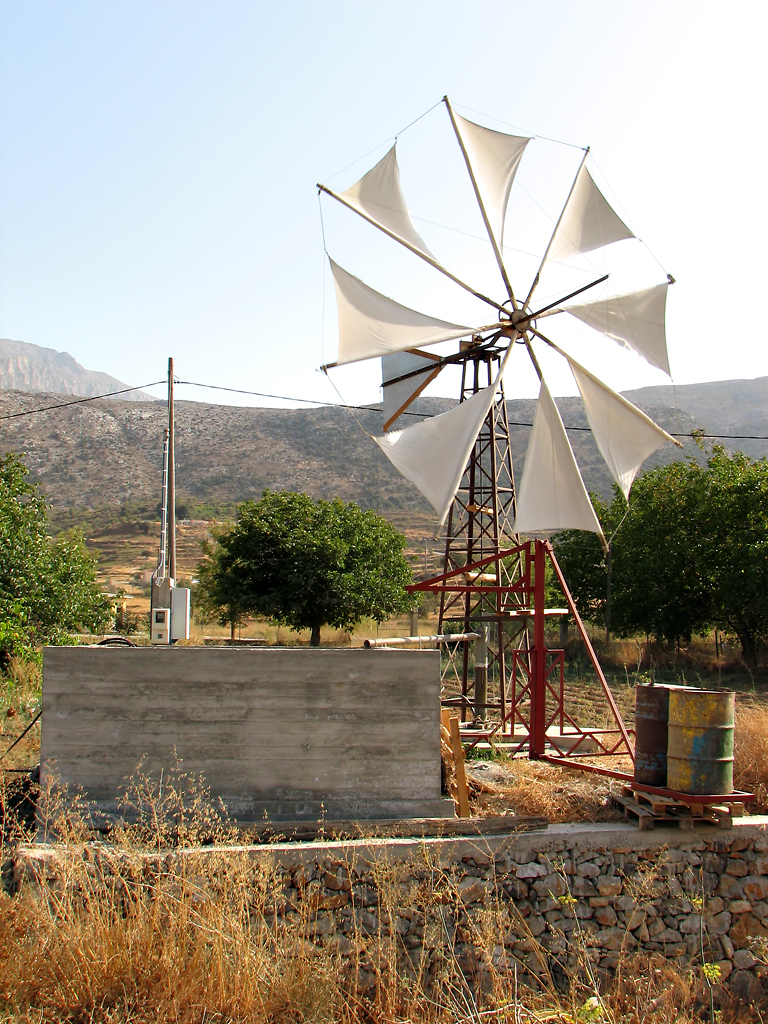
Lasithi windmill.

The Lasithi Plateau stretches 11 km (6.8 mi) in the E-W direction and 6 km (3.7 mi) in the N-S direction. It is approximately 70 km (43 mi) east from Heraklion and lies at an average altitude of 840 m (2,760 ft). Winters can be harsh and snow on the plain and surrounding mountains can persist until mid-spring. The plateau is famous for its white-sailed windmills, (more accurately, wind-pumps), made to a local design, that have been used since the 1920s to irrigate the land. Despite there being around 10,000 in the past, most of them have been abandoned in recent times in favour of modern diesel and electric pumps. Because the water table is close to the surface of the ground, the bodies of the dead are often housed above ground during burial, in stone mausoleums, or decorative stone boxes. This is because the plateau is endorheic, and there is impermeable rock just below the surface of the ground. Floodwater from the plateau is diverted via a 3.5 km tunnel to Aposelemis Dam reservoir.

== History ==
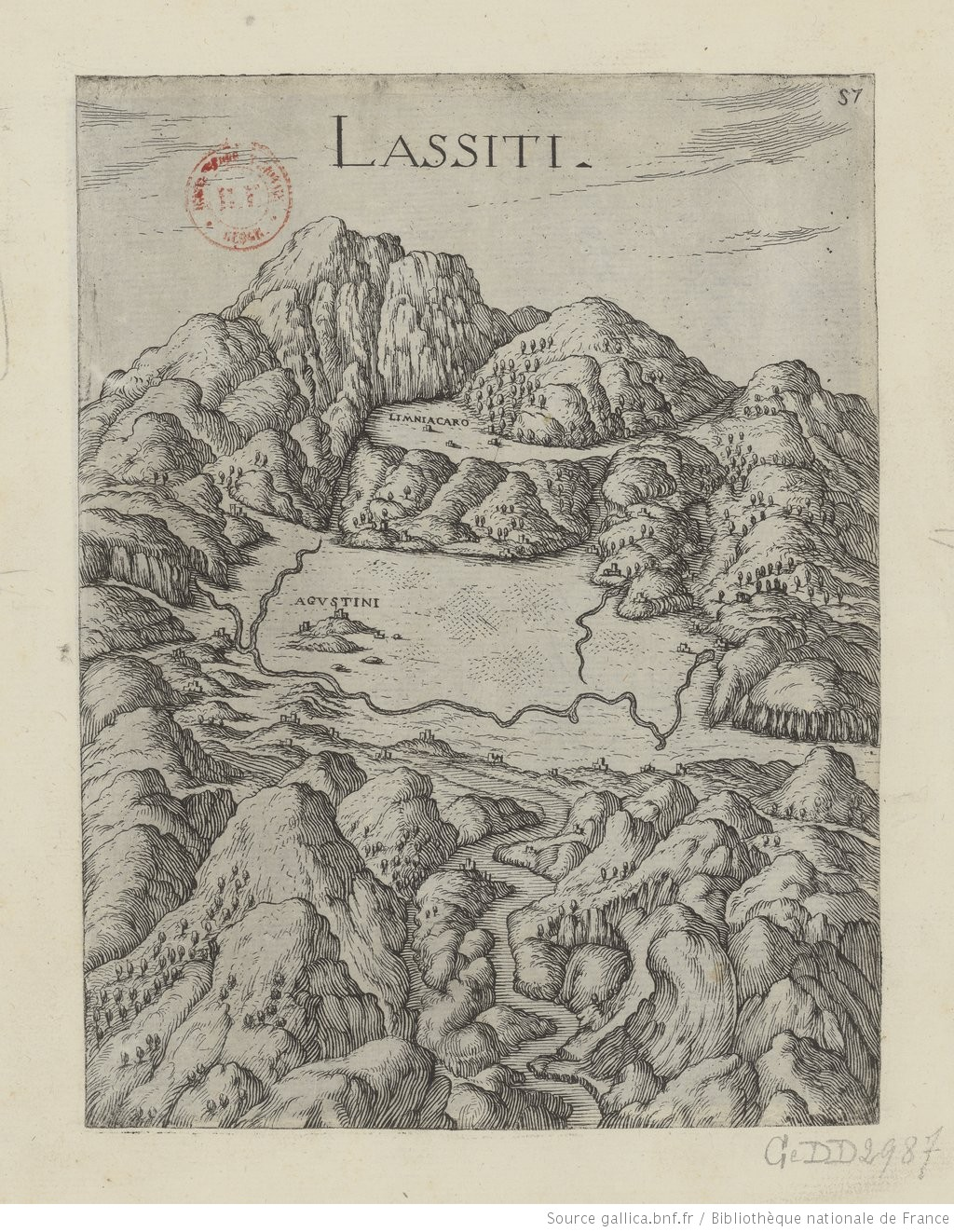
Lasithi Plateau by Marco Boschini, 1651

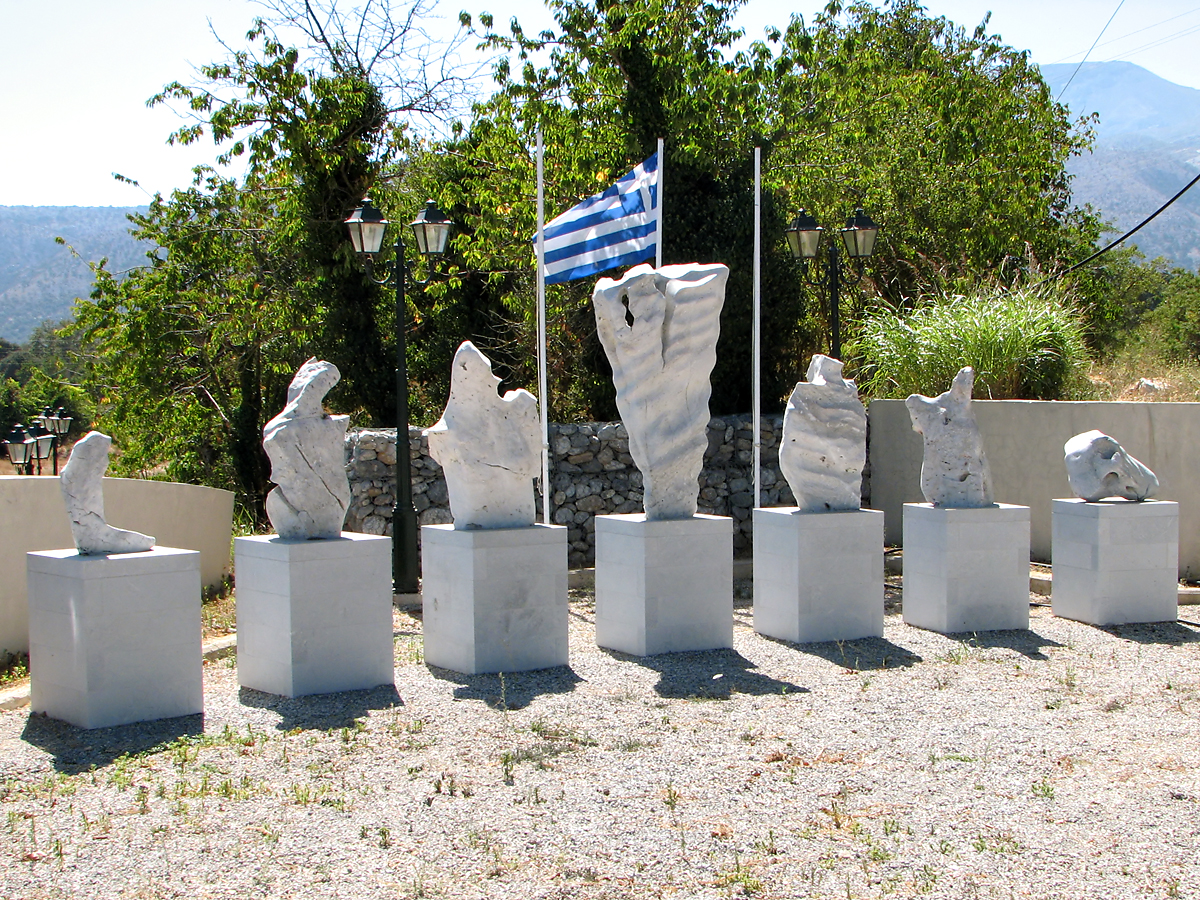
Monument in Kroustalenia commemorating the destruction of Lasithi by Ottoman and Egyptian forces in May 1867.

The fertile soil of the plateau, due to alluvial run-off from melting snow, has attracted inhabitants since Neolithic times (6000 BC). Minoans and Dorians followed and the plateau has been continuously inhabited since then, except a period that started in 1293 and lasted for over two centuries during the Venetian occupation of Crete. During that time and due to frequent rebellions and strong resistance, villages were demolished, cultivation prohibited, and natives were forced to leave and forbidden to return under penalty of death. A Venetian manuscript of the thirteenth century describes the troublesome plateau of Lasithi as spina nel cuore (di Venezia) – a thorn in the heart of Venice. Later, in the early 15th century, Venetian rulers allowed refugees from the Greek mainland (eastern Peloponnese) to settle in the plain and cultivate the land again. To ensure good crops, Venetians designed a large system of drainage ditches (linies, Greek: λίνιες) that were constructed between 1514 and 1560 and are still in use. The ditches transfer the water to Honos (Greek: Χώνος), a sinkhole in the west edge of the plateau, that feeds the river Aposelemis.

During the Greek War of Independence in January 1823, Hassan Pasha led an army of Ottoman and Egyptian forces sent by Muhammad Ali that seized the plateau killing most residents who had not fled to the mountains. In May 1867 during the great Great Cretan Revolt, Ottoman and Egyptian forces under the command of Pashas Omar and Ismail Selim marched towards the Lasithi plateau. Their aim was to strike a decisive blow on the revolutionaries who used it as their hideout. After fierce fighting, the outnumbered rebels were defeated and forced to retreat to the slopes of Dikti. Between 21 and 29 of May, many village dwellers were slaughtered or taken as slaves, their homes were set ablaze after being looted and livestock and crops were destroyed. The Kroustalenia Monastery that was the seat of the revolutionary committee was also demolished, though it was later rebuilt.

During the Axis occupation of Greece in 1941–1944, the peaks surrounding the plateau were used as hideouts by local resistance fighters.

== Archaeological sites ==
There are several caves of archaeological interest in the plateau and surrounding mountains. The Psychro Cave (Greek: Δικταίον Άντρον, also Diktaean / Diktaian Cave) in the Dikti mountains near the village of Psychro (Greek: Ψυχρό) is reputedly the birthplace of Zeus according to Greek Mythology. Zeus is also said to have used the cave as his hiding place after abducting Europa. The archeological site of Karfi, believed to be the last outpost of the Minoan civilization is located in the mountains immediately north of the plateau.

== Economy ==
Permanent residents derive most of their income from agriculture and animal farming, a smaller number from tourism.

== Population genetics studies ==
Because of its isolated nature, the Lasithi plateau has attracted the attention of population geneticists. A 2007 Y-DNA study showed that Y-DNA samples from the Lasithi plateau differed significantly from those of lowland Crete, and may be indicative of it having served as a refugium of the Minoan civilization. A 2013 mtDNA study of bone samples from a Minoan ossuary in the Lasithi Plateau, dated to 4,400-3,700 years ago, showed that Minoan samples were closest to samples drawn from the modern population of the plateau, as well as other Greek, western and northern European samples, while being distant from North African and Egyptian samples. According to the authors, these results are consistent with the hypothesis the plateau served as a Minoan refugium, and that the current inhabitants of the plateau carry the maternal signature of the Minoan population.

== Gallery ==
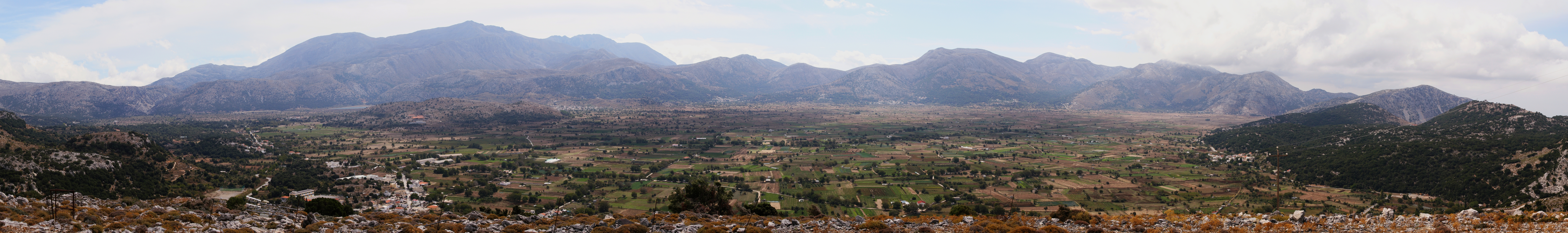
The Plateau seen from the north

== See also ==
- Limnakaro a smaller plateau, south of the Lasithi plateau
- Dikti
