= Kritsa =

Kritsa Κριτσά
- Community
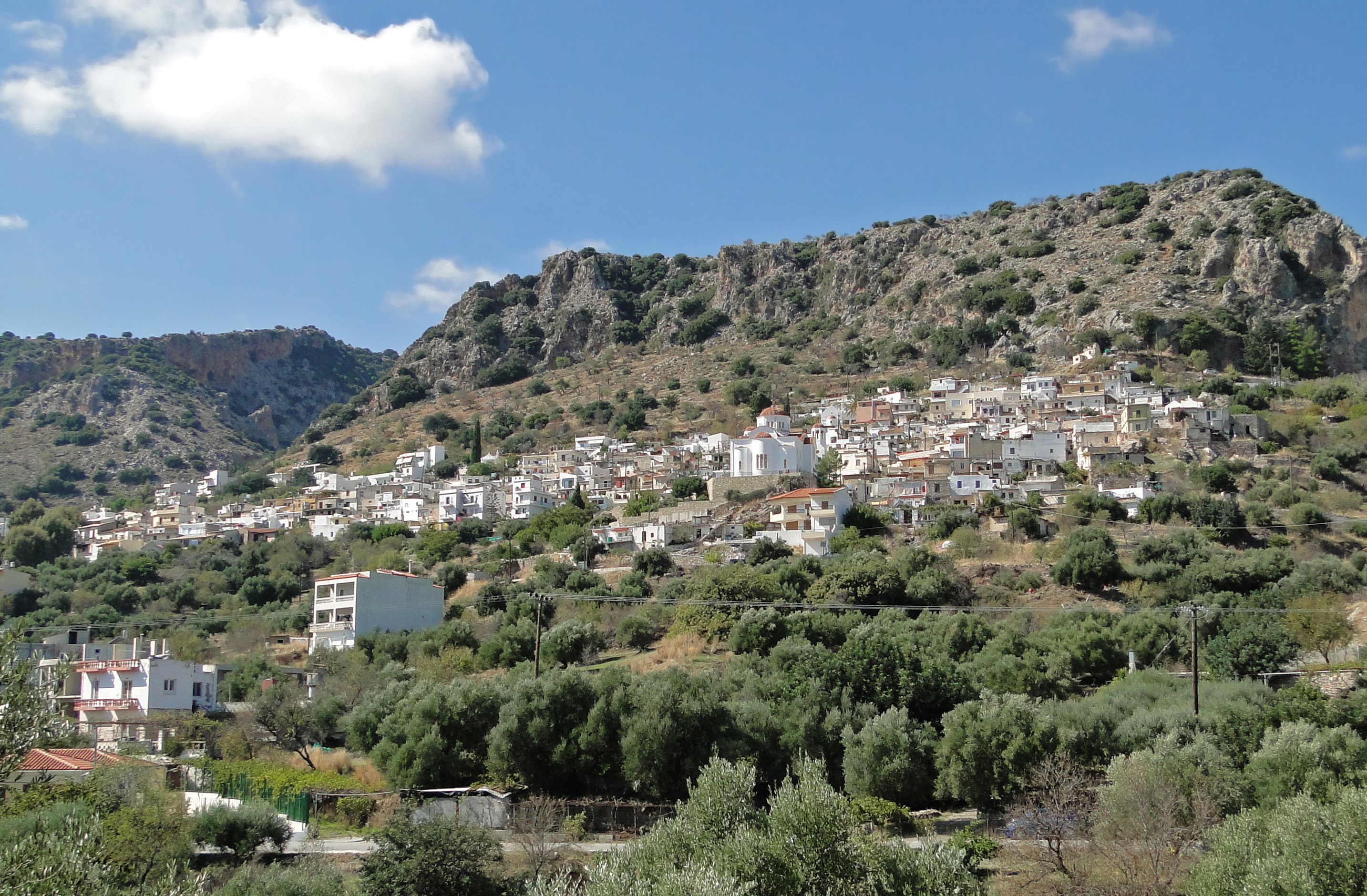

- Location within Greece
- Coordinates: 35°09′25″N 25°38′40″E
- Country: Greece
- Administrative region: Crete
- Regional unit: Lasithi
- Municipality: Agios Nikolaos
- Municipal unit: Agios Nikolaos
- Elevation: 375 m (1,230 ft)

Population (2021)
  - Community: 2,630
- Time zone: UTC+2 (EET)
  - Summer (DST): UTC+3 (EEST)

Kritsa (Greek: Κριτσά, romanized: Critsá) is one of the oldest and most picturesque villages in Crete, Greece, built amphitheatrically on a rock hill, named Kastellos, surrounded by olive groves, at an altitude of 375 m. It is part of the municipality of Agios Nikolaos. During the Middle Ages, it was thought to be the largest village in Crete. Kritsa has been destroyed many times during the last centuries because it participated in all of Crete's revolutions. It is located 10 km from Agios Nikolaos and has about 2200 inhabitants who live in different neighborhoods named Palemilos, Koukistres, Christos and Pergiolikia.

== History ==
Kritsa has an extensive historic record with evidence of occupation as early as the second millennium BCE. Near the village, three kilometers to the north, are the ruins of the ancient Greek city Lato, which was noted as one of the most powerful Dorian towns in Crete, with two acropoleis. The oldest settlement in the Kritsa area, on the steep rocky hill south of the village named Kastellos, dates back to the 13–12th centuries BCE (Late Minoan IIIC). Lato is thought to may have been founded when Kastellos was abandoned. Before the entrance of the village is the old Byzantine Church of Panagia Kera with unique, in technique and importance, Byzantine frescos (13th and 14th centuries CE).

In 1927, a group of local olive producers formed the Agricultural Co-operative of Kritsa. The group opened its own factory for olive oil production in the village in 1937.

== Sights and handicrafts ==
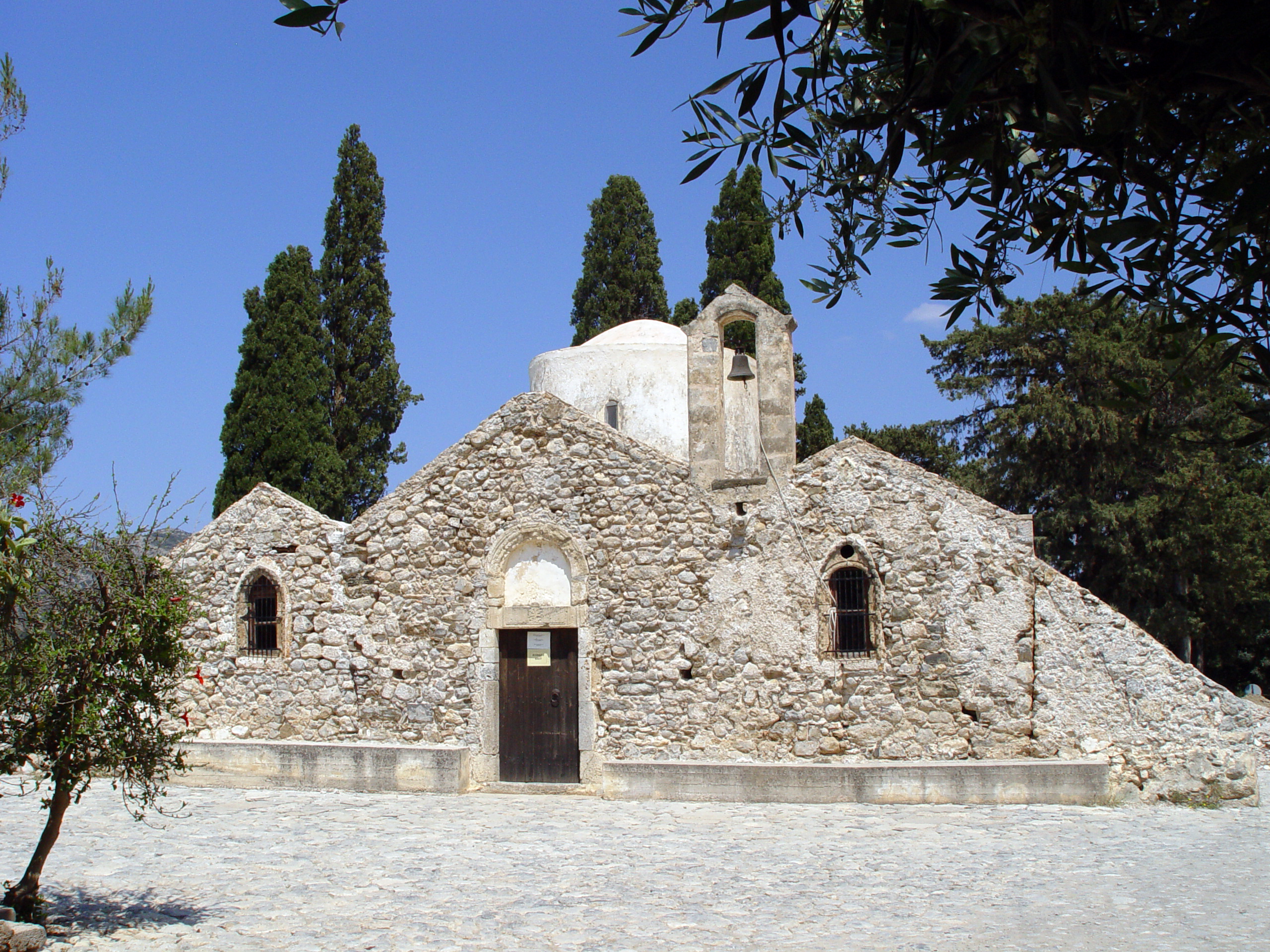
Panagia Kera in Kritsa

When Kritsa is lit up in the evening it has the form of a scorpion. Old Cretan customs and traditions are kept alive, and Kritsa is considered one of the most important centers of weaving art. The narrow streets are visited by tourists. From Kritsa there is an interesting and spectacular climb to the plateau of Katharo, which provides a panoramic view of Mirabello Bay, Agios Nikolaos and Kalo Horio. The Kritsa Gorge is located on the route to Tapes or to Lato.
