= Mikronisi (Lasithi) =

Greek islet in the Aegean Sea

Native name: Μικρονήσι
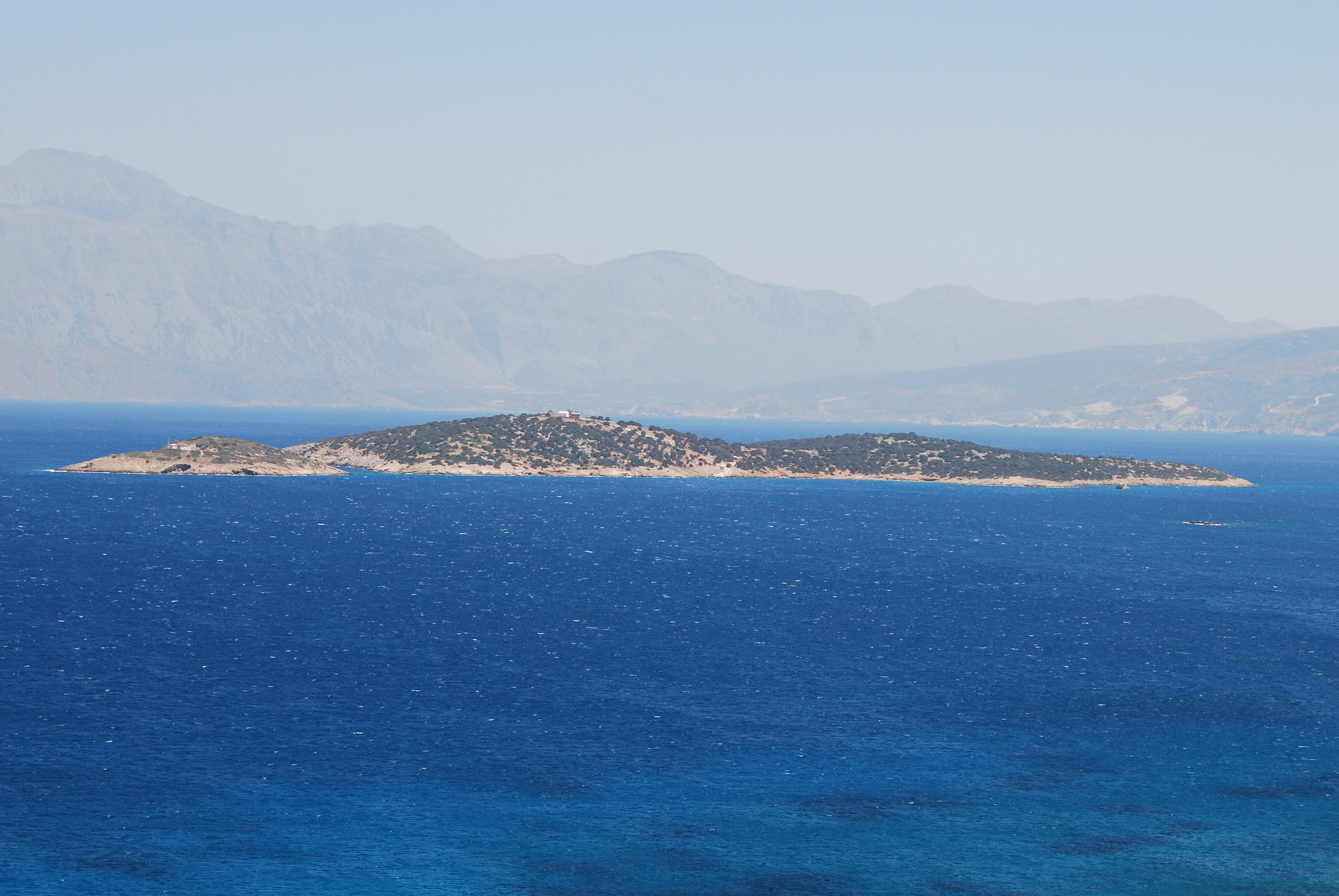
- Mikronisi in the foreground
- Interactive map of Mikronisi

Geography
- Location: Sea of Crete
- Coordinates: 35°12′10″N 25°43′55″E
- Archipelago: Cretan Islands
- Area: 0.04 km^{2} (0.015 sq mi)

Administration
- Greece
- Region: Crete
- Regional unit: Lasithi

Demographics
- Population: 0 (2001)

Mikronisi (Greek: Μικρονήσι, "little island") is an uninhabited Greek islet, in the Aegean Sea, close to the northern coast of eastern Crete. Administratively it lies within the Agios Nikolaos municipality of Lasithi.

== See also ==
- List of islands of Greece
