= Sisi, Crete =

Greek resort

Coordinates: 35.308°N 25.520°E

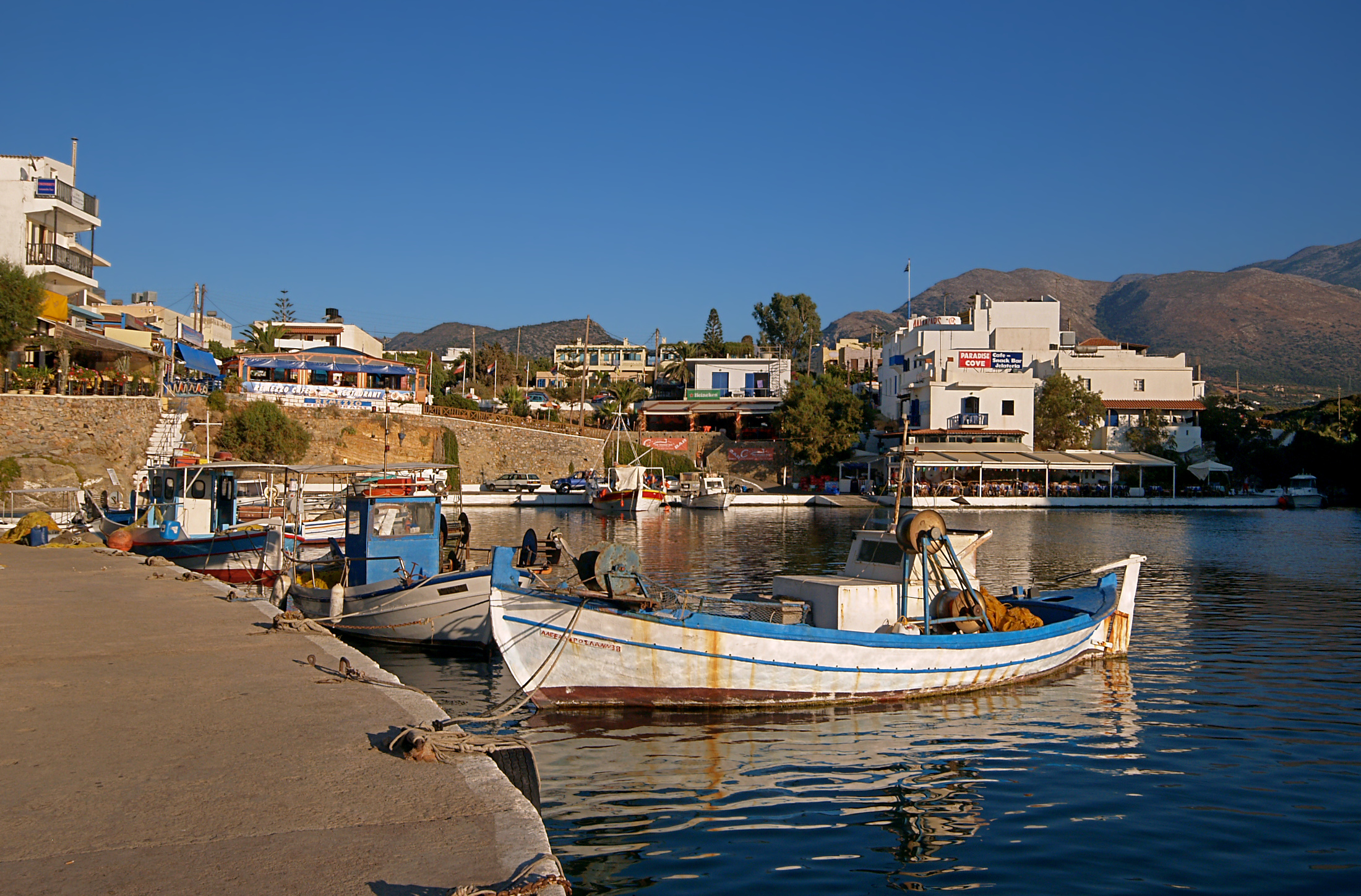
Harbour of Sisi

Sisi (Greek: Σείσι), or Sissi is a small Greek resort in the municipal unit Vrachasi, Agios Nikolaos, Lasithi, Crete. It is situated on the north coast, 6 km northwest of Vrachasi and 6 km east of Malia, 22 km northwest of Agios Nikolaos and 35 km east of Heraklion.

A key strategic port as far back as the occupational period of Crete by the Republic of Venice, and especially for the Ottomans during the Great Cretan Revolution. An important Minoan civilization archaeological site about 500 meters west of the current village, shows evidence of the area's importance since before the Early Minoan IIA (ca. 2600 BC) period.

On the 4th of November 2023 the World Meteorological Organization station of Sisi recorded a temperature of 35.1 °C (95 °F) setting the European November high temperature record.
