= Katharo =

Coordinates: 35.14616°N 25.566216°E

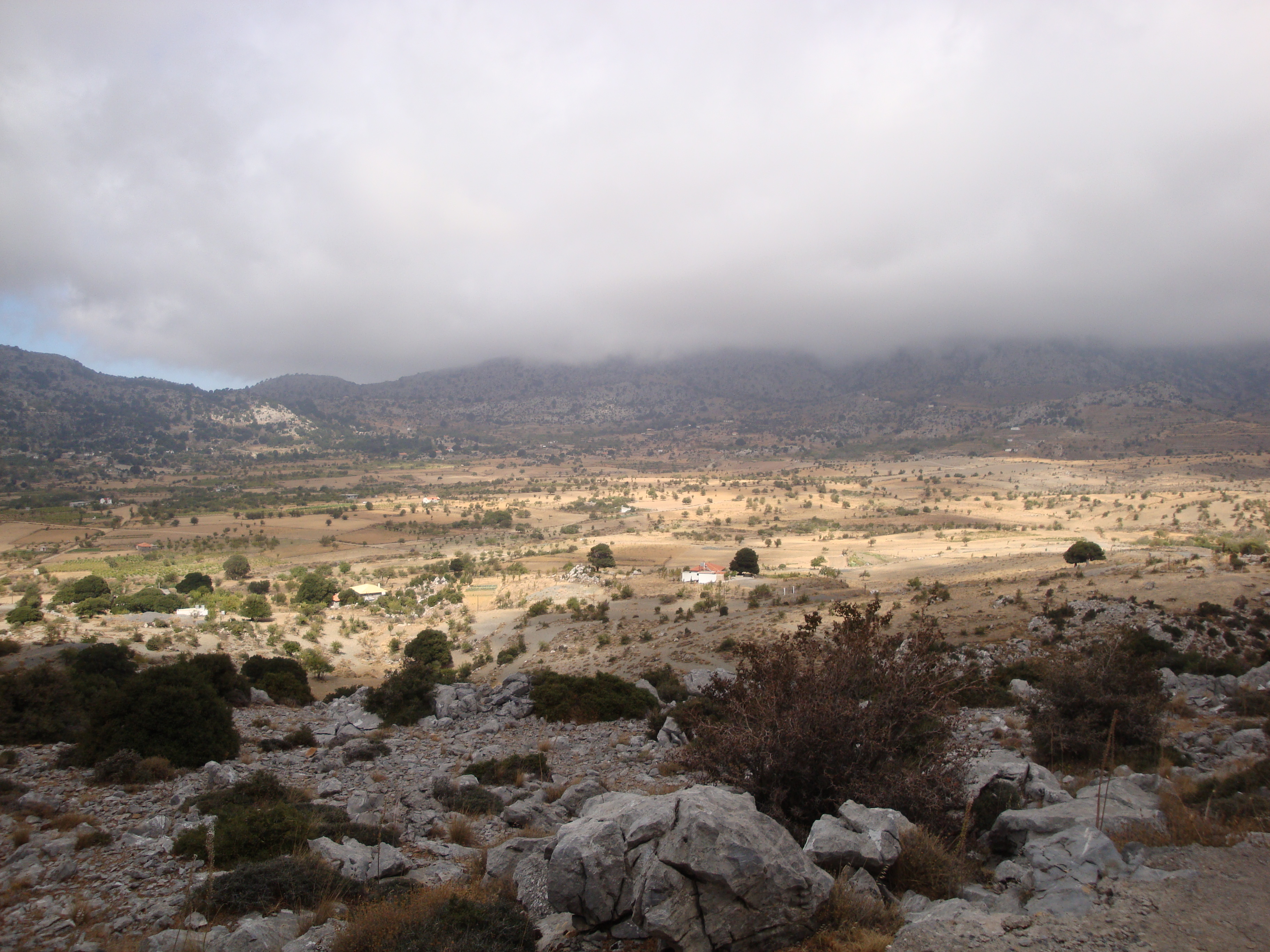
Katharo plateau

Katharo is a plateau on the Dikti mountain on the island of Crete, in the regional unit of Lasithi. Administratively it belongs to the municipality of Agios Nikolaos, (municipal division of Kritsa). It is 16 km (9.9 mi) from Kritsa (asphalt road) and 12 km (7.5 mi) from Mesa Lasithi (rough mountain road). It is 4 km (2.5 mi) long, 1.5 km (0.93 mi) wide and at an average altitude of 1,150 m (3,770 ft) above sea level, (300 m (980 ft) higher than Lasithi Plateau). On the west of Katharo are the peaks of Spathi (2,148 m (7,047 ft)) and Lazaros (2,085 m (6,841 ft)), and on the North East and East are the peaks of Tsivi (1,665 m (5,463 ft)) and Platia Koryfi (1,485 m (4,872 ft)). The waters of the Plateau drain through the Havgas gorge into the much larger but lower Lasithi Plateau, thus Katharo is part of river Aposelemis drainage area.

Due to its altitude the plateau is not inhabited in winter; in summer it has about 500 inhabitants, mainly shepherds and a few tavernas. Katharo has a special property status and is essentially community-owned. The fertile soil of the plateau is used for the production of vegetables, potatoes and fruit (grapes, pears, apples).
