= Agios Nikolaos =

Agios Nikolaos is the Greek name of St Nicholas. As a place name, it may refer to:

== Greece ==
- Agios Nikolaos, Glyfada, a luxury district in Glyfada, Athens
- Agios Nikolaos, village in the community Kallithea, Phocis
- Agios Nikolaos, Boeotia, a settlement in the Distomo-Arachova-Antikyra municipality
- Agios Nikolaos, Crete, a port town in Crete
  - Agios Nikolaos (municipality), the larger municipality the port town is in
  - Agios Nikolaos (football club)
- Agios Nikolaos (Chania), an islet on the coast of Crete
- Agios Nikolaos, Messenia, a popular holiday village on the Mani Peninsula in southern Greece, Lefktro municipality
- Agios Nikolaos, village in the community Kounoupitsa in the Methana peninsula, Peloponnese
- Agios Nikolaos, Chalkidiki, part of the municipality Sithonia, Chalkidiki
- Agios Nikolaos, Corfu, a village southeastern Corfu
- Agios Nikolaos, Zakynthos, a village in the north of the island of Zakynthos
- Agios Nikolaos, an alternative name of Koiliomenos, a village in the south of the island of Zakynthos
- Agios Nikolaos, Voies, a village in the Voies municipal unit in Laconia
- Agios Nikolaos, a village in the Sminos municipal unit in Laconia
- Agios Nikolaos, Spata

== Cyprus ==
- Agios Nikolaos, Famagusta a village in the Famagusta District
- Agios Nikolaos (Kato Polemidia), a quarter of Kato Polemidia, Limassol District
- Agios Nikolaos Lefkas an abandoned village in the Nicosia District
- Agios Nikolaos, Paphos a village in the Paphos District
- Ayios Nikolaos, SBA a former village located in the Sovereign Base Area of Dhekelia
  - Ayios Nikolaos Station, a British military installation
- Agios Nikolaos tis Stegis, a historic church near Kakopetria, Nicosia District
