= Kritsa Gorge =

Narrow gorge in Crete

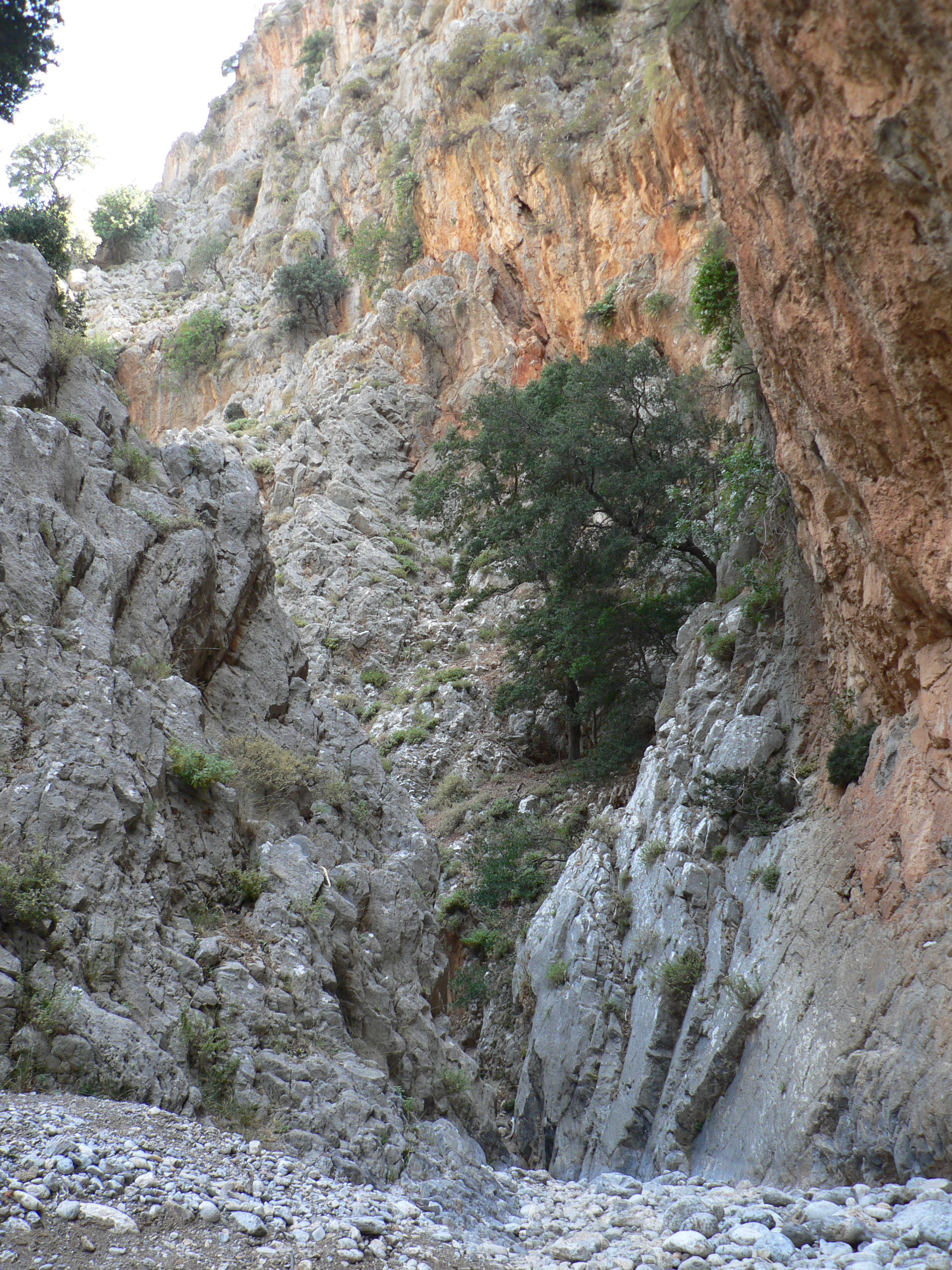
Kritsa Gorge

Kritsa Gorge (Greek Φαράγγι Κριτσάς [fa'ragi kri'tsas]) is a narrow gorge not far from the village of Kritsa, in Crete, Greece, west of Agios Nikolaos.

The gorge contains a 4 kilometres (2.5 mi) hiking trail, with some narrow passages between walls of rock.
