= Konida =

Greek islet in the Libyan Sea

Native name: Κονίδα
- Location within Greece

Geography
- Coordinates: 35.1258°N 25.8111°E
- Archipelago: Cretan Islands

Administration
- Greece
- Region: Crete
- Regional unit: Lasithi

Demographics
- Population: 0 (2001)

Konida (Greek: Κονίδα), is an uninhabited Greek islet, in the Libyan Sea, close to the eastern coast of Crete. Administratively it lies within the Ierapetra municipality of Lasithi.

== See also ==
- List of islands of Greece
