= Church of Panagia Kera =

Cretan Byzantine church in Kritsa, Greece

- Εκκλησία της Παναγίας της Κεράς
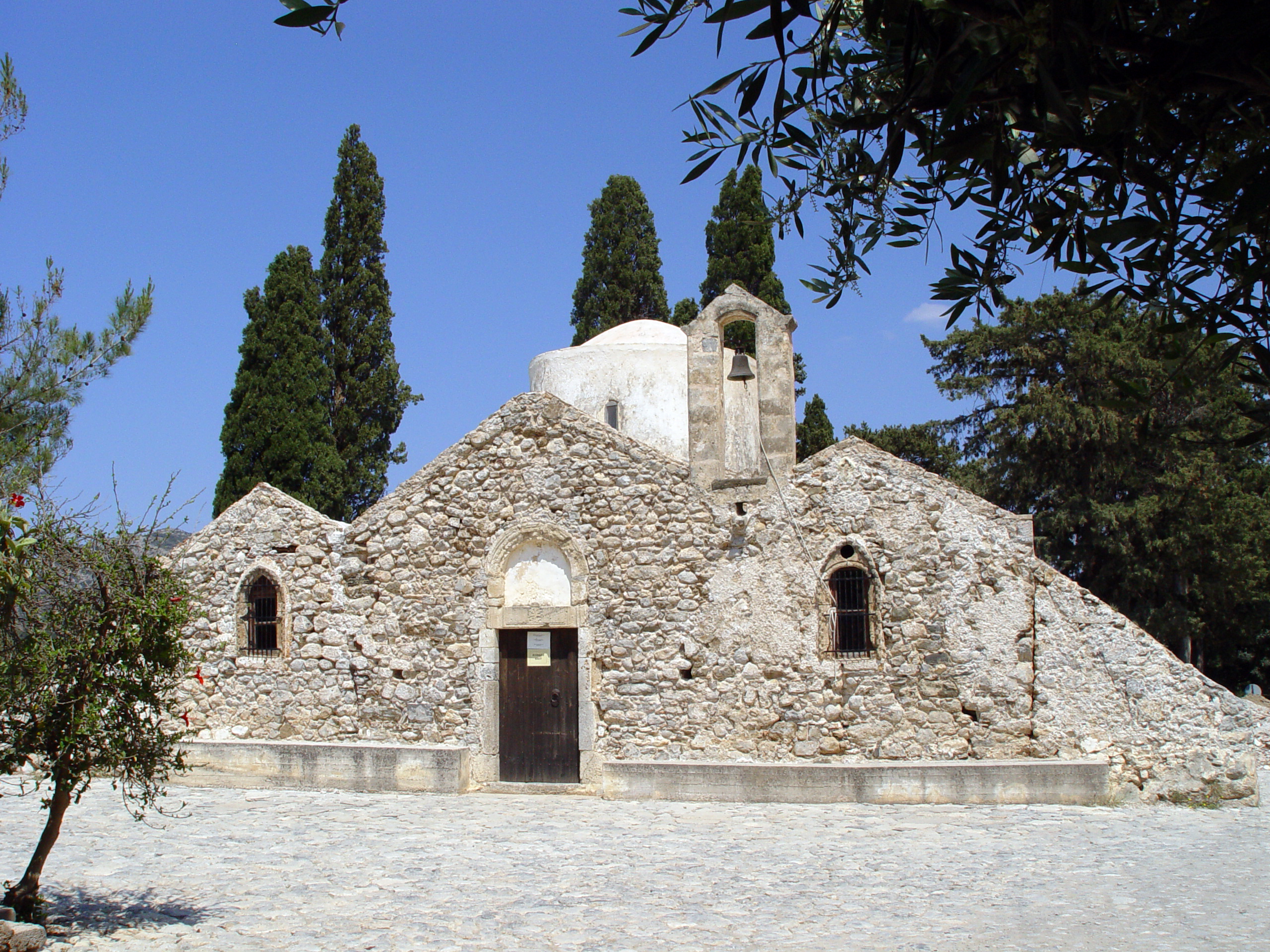
- A view of the church facade

- Location of the church in Crete
- Church of Panagia Kera
- 35°09′24″N 25°39′19″E
- Location: Kritsa, Lasithi
- Country: Greece
- Denomination: Greek Orthodox

History
- Status: Church
- Dedication: Panagia

Architecture
- Functional status: Active
- Architectural type: Church
- Style: Byzantine
- Completed: 13th century

Specifications
- Materials: Stone; tiles

Administration
- Archdiocese: Church of Crete

The Church of Panagia Kera (Greek: Εκκλησία της Παναγίας της Κεράς) is a Greek Orthodox church located near the village of Kritsa, in the Dikte Mountains, on the island of Crete, Greece. Situated 1 kilometre (0.62 mi) from Kritsa, the Byzantine-style church contains the finest-preserved Byzantine-era frescoes in Crete, and for that reason, has become one of the most culturally and historically significant churches on the island.

== History ==
The late Greek word ‘Panagia’ is defined as ‘Virgin’ in English, and is among the titles of the Virgin Mary in the Eastern Orthodox Church. Although no founding date for the Church of Panagia Kera has been established, historical consensus agrees that the oldest parts of the church, the central nave, its vaulted roof and dome, were constructed and painted in the 13th century. The side-aisles of the church, its western entrance, and the belfry and the buttresses supporting the church, were later built and painted during the early to mid-14th century. The frescoes in Panagia Kera date from the Paleologian Renaissance, due to their vivid, bright colors.

According to local tradition, the church contained an icon of the Virgin Mary, which was believed to have miraculous powers. During the period of Byzantine Iconoclasm, it was removed to Constantinople, but was later returned. In 1498, during the Venetian occupation of Crete, a Greek trader stole the icon, which was later transported to the temple of Saint Alfonso on the Esquiline Hill in Rome. Panagia Kera was later renovated by the Managgaris family in 1722, and in 1732 the icon of the Virgin Mary was repainted in the church by an unknown artist.

== Frescoes ==
The frescoes on the dome and the central nave depict the following scenes from the New Testament: the Presentation, the Baptism, the Raising of Lazarus and the Entry into Jerusalem. The central aisle of the church is dedicated to the Virgin Mary and the Assumption. The frescoes on the western wall of the church depict the Crucifixion of Jesus and the Punishment of the Damned, with Michael the Archangel announcing the Second Coming. The south aisle of Saint Anne is decorated with images of the life of the Virgin Mary, and the north aisle is dedicated to Saint Anthony, with frescoes of the Second Coming and Judgement Day. Next to the north aisle is a depiction of Heaven, complete with the Patriarchs Abraham, Isaac and Jacob, as well as the Virgin Mary.

== Gallery ==
Fresco of the Virgin Mary riding on a donkey

Fresco of a row of saints

Fresco of an adult Jesus with the Virgin Mary

The frescoed interior of the church's dome

Fresco of St. Geroge on a white horse, depicted as a dragonslayer.

Fresco of the Infant Jesus, the Virgin Mary and Saint Joseph

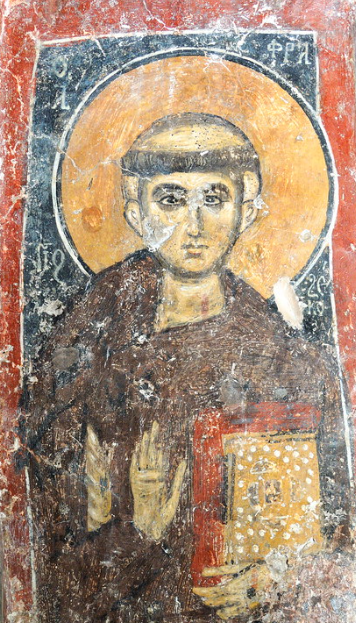
Fresco of Francis of Assisi, with stigmata

== See also ==
- Church of Crete
- List of Eastern Orthodox church buildings in Greece
