= Magasa =

Magasa may refer to places in:

Greece

- Magasa, Crete, a Neolithic settlement

Italy

- Magasa, Lombardy, a comune in the Province of Brescia
