= Lasithi Province =

Coordinates: 35.082832°N 25.711899°E

Lasithi Province Επαρχία Λασιθίου
- Province of Greece
- 2006
- Capital: Tzermiado

Lasithi Province was one of the 4 provinces in Lasithi Prefecture of Greece. Its territory corresponded with that of the current municipality Oropedio Lasithiou and one village of the municipality Agios Nikolaos (Exo Potamoi). It was abolished in 2006.
