= Lato pros Kamara =

Ancient city in Crete

Coordinates: 35°11′27″N 25°43′02″E

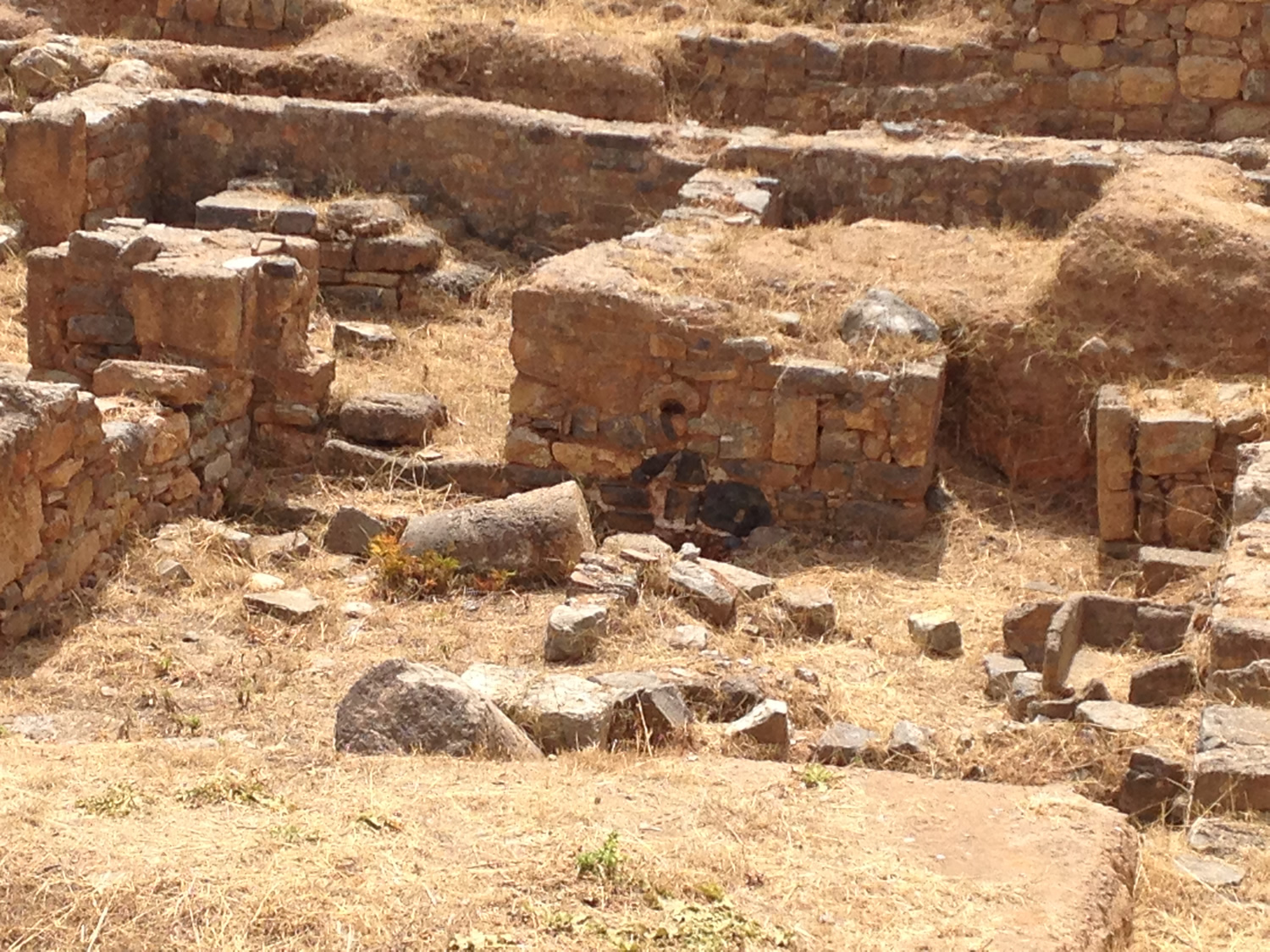
Ancient ruins at Agios Nikolaos, ancient Lato pros Kamara

Lato pros Kamara or simply Kamara or Camara (Ancient Greek: Καμάρα) was an ancient city of Crete, situated to the east of Olous, according to the Maritime Itinerary at a distance of 15 stadia (approximately 2.36 km or 1.47 mi). It is currently the site of Agios Nikolaos, Crete. Lato pros Kamara was settled in the late Bronze Age as the population of Dorian Lato realised greater security. Its expanding population settled the coastal area, which had been subject to greater likelihood of marine attack during the earlier Bronze Age. Xenion, a Cretan historian quoted by Stephanus of Byzantium says that it was once called "Lato", however, modern scholarship distinguishes the two, placing Lato pros Kamara as the port of Lato. Lato pros Kamara outlasted Lato well into Roman times.

== See also ==
- Lato
- Agios Nikolaos, Crete
