= Molyvoti Site =

Archaeological site in northern Greece

Molyvoti is an archaeological site located on a peninsula in Northern Greece southwest of Komotini.

Numerous excavations have provided evidence that Molyvoti was a city first occupied during the Archaic Greece period, in the 6th-4th centuries BC. More recent excavations in 2013 revealed that the settlement was later occupied during the Late Roman period, in the 3rd to 5th centuries AD. The earliest literary reference to the Ancient Stryme, with which the site is often identified, is 7th cen. BC.

== Excavation History ==
=== 1957-1959 ===
Archaeologist George Bakalakis conducted the first excavation of Molyvoti in 1957. The archaeological work included approximately 75 days of excavations throughout the two-year period. His findings led him to conclude that the site dated as far back as the late 6th century BC, but was most occupied during the 4th century BC.

=== 1995, 1996 and 1998 ===
In 1980 a grid was established to form excavation units. The site was first divided into 300 x 300 m squares, then subdivided into 10 x 10 m squares, and once more into 5 x 5 m squares. Ephor Diamantis Triantafyllos and Domna Terzopoulou led the three excavations in the 1990s, where a total of 32 squares were excavated. Artifacts found during this time further supported Bakalakis's conclusions about when the site was occupied.

=== 2013 ===
The 2013 excavations were conducted for the Molyvoti, Thrace, Archaeological Project (MTAP), a Greek-American collaboration co-directed by Nathan Arrington (Princeton University), Marina Tasiklaki, Domna Tersopoulou. and Thomas Tartaron. According to Arrington et al. (2016), the goal of this project was to "investigate the identity, form, and chronology of the settlement", as well as form a better understanding of the "economic, political, and cultural contexts" of the site. The project also focused extensively on the Emporion (trading port) and its evolution through changing economic and cultural contexts. The excavation occurred from June 10 to July 19 and established later occupation during the Late Roman period and that the site was not terminated by Philip ca. 350.

== Artifacts Found ==
=== Classical Period ===
==== Coins ====
The majority of the Classical period coins found were Maronitan coins. Twenty-eight silver Maronitan coins (430-400 BC) were found in 1957, and 55 were found in 2013, one silver, and the rest bronze (400-350 BC). Some notable coins from the same excavation include a silver coin from Neapolis, determined to be the oldest coin from the first half of the 5th century, and a coin from Trikke, an unusual coin to find due to the distance between the two areas. Other 4th century BC coins found included coins of Samothrace, Alexander III, Zone, Imbros, and 13 coins of Phillip II. While some scholars have thought that the coins make the city into Archaic Maroneia, they rather show that the city at Molyvoti fell under the economic influence of Maroneia.

==== Pottery ====
The vast majority of pottery found at Molyvoti were sherds of amphoras. Most of the amphora sherds came from the Northern Aegean region dating from the later 5th century into much of the 4th century BC. Southern Aegean, Chian, North Ionian, Thasian, and Lesbian amphora sherds were also found to have been imported to the region between the late 6th and early 5th centuries BC. Other common pieces of pottery found included sherds of coarse-ware vessels, black-glaze vessels, fine-ware vessels, and bolsals.

==== Botanical ====
The 2013 excavation uncovered eight cereal grains and 19 fragments of charred food residues, both indicative of cooking and food preparation during the Classical period. Other crops found include vetch, goatgrass, and cleavers.

==== Faunal ====
Faunal evidence dating to the Classic period was dominated by sheep and goat, making up about 75% of the bones found. This finding points to the possibility of sheep and goat husbandry during the Classical period. The second most common bones belonged to cattle, and a tiny percentage belonged to pigs.

=== Late Roman Period ===
==== Coins ====
47 of the 116 coins found during the 2013 excavation dated to the Roman and Late Roman periods. The majority were from the first half of the 4th century AD, the most common being coins of Constantius II. The earliest coins found after the first abandonment of the site were coins of Gallienus, Aurelianus, Diocletanius or Maximanius, and Claudius II, all of which dated to the second half of the 3rd century. The latest coin found was a coin minted by Honorius (395-401 AD) in the late 4th century AD.

==== Pottery ====
Compared to the Classical period findings in 2013, far fewer pottery sherds were found that dated to the Roman/Late Roman periods. Roman period pottery included amphora fragments and sherds of fine ware. The most common pottery of the Late Roman period were sherds of decorated African Red Slip bowls and dishes dated to around 400 AD. Also, “several small fragments of thin gray open vessels with white linear and curvilinear decoration” from the Late Roman Period were found.

==== Botanical ====
Botanical remains uncovered in 2013 showed evidence of cooking and cereal-processing during the Late Roman period. The list of plants found included bromegrass, ryegrass, cleavers, common mallow, barley, einkorn, pea, broomcorn millet, oat, and vetch.

==== Faunal ====
Faunal remains for the Late Roman period showed a larger diversity in diet. While these remains also included a large portion of sheep/goat, the percentage was almost matched by pig. Other faunal remains included a small portion of cattle, fish, birds, and small mammals such as mustelids, cervids, and equids.

== Site Significance ==
The amount of amphora sherds and types of coins, as well as two partially manmade harbors seen in satellite photographs, points to Molyvoti being part of a trade network primarily during the 4th century BC. Given that most of the amphora sherds and coins came from nearby regions, it appears to have been a local trade network with few longer distance imports. More research is needed to determine precisely how the site was used during the Late Roman period. The name of the site continues to be disputed. One of the main contributions of the site has been to show that it was reoccupied after a destruction horizon possibly by Philip, thus testifying to the resilience of the community.
