= Lake Voulismeni =

Lake in Aghios Nikolaos, Crete, Greece

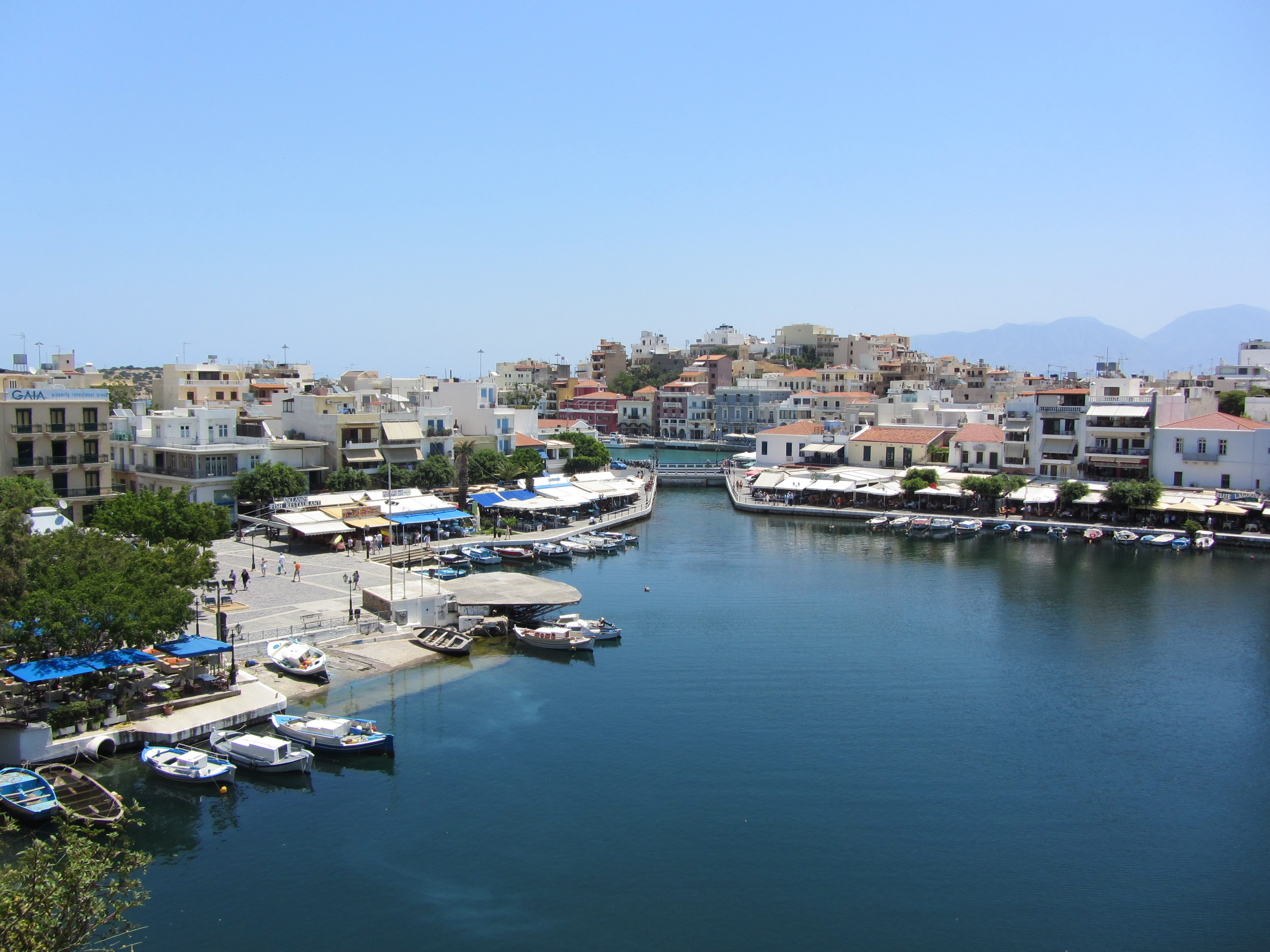

- Location within Greece
- Location: Crete
- Coordinates: 35°11′26″N 25°43′2″E
- Basin countries: Greece
- Max. width: 137 m (449 ft)
- Max. depth: 48.8 m (160 ft)
- Surface elevation: 0 m (0 ft)
- Settlements: Agios Nikolaos

Lake Voulismeni (Greek: Λίμνη Βουλισμένη, Límni Voulisméni) is a small, formerly freshwater lake, later connected to the sea, located at the centre of the town of Agios Nikolaos on the Greek island of Crete. It has a circular shape with a diameter of 137 m and a depth of 48.8 m. The locals refer to it as simply "The Lake". The lake is connected to the harbour of the town by a channel dug by soldiers of the French Army in 1907. A panoramic view of the lake can be seen from a small park situated above it.

According to legend, the goddess Athena bathed in it. Every year at midnight turning to Orthodox Christian Easter day, the majority of the population of the town gathers around the lake to celebrate with fireworks, and firecrackers thrown by the people attending the event.

The rocks at the lake are limestone breccias, the result of undersea landslides coming down from the mountains to the north-west of the town.

A normal fault which cuts right through the town in a roughly NNE to SSW direction passes directly through the north-western side of the lake, the cliff at the lake is the scarp slope of this fault. Elsewhere in the town the fault was later buried by subsequent underwater landslides. An underground stream that was cut by this fault created a solution sinkhole and a small cave following the disappearance of the overlying sea during the Messinian Salinity Crisis. After only a few hundred thousand years the small cave, dissolved out of the unstable and structurally weak breccia, collapsed creating a deep hole. The destabilised breccia at the top of this hole subsided into the hole creating a deep funnel-shaped sinkhole which was subsequently filled with freshwater by the still running spring. The creation of the Mediterranean Sea during the Zanclean Flood left a deep, spring-fed, freshwater lake that overflowed via a small stream into the nearby sea.

In 1852 Captain Thomas Spratt surveyed eastern Crete on behalf of the Royal Navy and recorded the lake as being ...a small circular pool of brackish water and ....having a small stream opening out of it into the sea, clear evidence that the spring was still flowing at that time. He also measured the depth of the lake as 64 m (210 ft) and it is this figure that is used in almost all publications and writings about the lake today. In September 2000 the geology department of the University of Athens conducted a detailed underwater survey of the lake, finding its maximum depth to be only 48.8 m.

On 12 October 1856 a massive earthquake occurred in the sea off Crete with an epicentre only 40 km from the lake. Although its magnitude was not recorded, it was listed as grade XI on the Modified Mercalli Intensity Scale, one grade down from the maximum possible. This earthquake was most likely responsible for the blocking or diversion of the freshwater spring leading to the later stagnation of the lake and the collapse of the western corner of the lake which reduced the lake depth from the 64m measured by Thomas Spratt to the 48.8 m today.

Once the spring had stopped flowing, the lake soon became stagnant. It became known locally as Vromolimni; 'the stinky lake'. The obvious solution was to dig a channel to the nearby sea to allow the denser seawater to flush away the stagnant freshwater and remove the source of the smell.

The first channel connecting the lake to the sea was dug by Kostas Adosides Pasha, the Ottoman governor of Lasithi at the time, between 1867 and 1871. This canal was dredged and widened several times between 1883 and 1890, and a simple wooden footbridge was built. The wider canal we see today was constructed by the French Army between 1905 and 1907. A lifting footbridge allowed boats to pass and be loaded and unloaded in the relative safety of the lake. The modern concrete road bridge was opened in 1954.

== Urban legends ==
A local urban myth is that the lake is bottomless and the crater of an extinct volcano. That notion is most likely based on its impressive depth compared to its width (48.8 m depth and only 134 m width) or/and on locals noticing disturbances at the surface or also the level of the water during the 1956 Amorgos earthquake (which was wrongly attributed to an eruption of Santorini). Because of the latter, many incorrectly assume a geological relationship between the two locations.

The complete absence of igneous rocks anywhere near the lake precludes its being a volcano crater, the supposed connection with Santorini can also be dismissed for this reason.
