= Vryonisi (islet) =

Islet in the Aegean Sea

Native name: Βρυονήσι
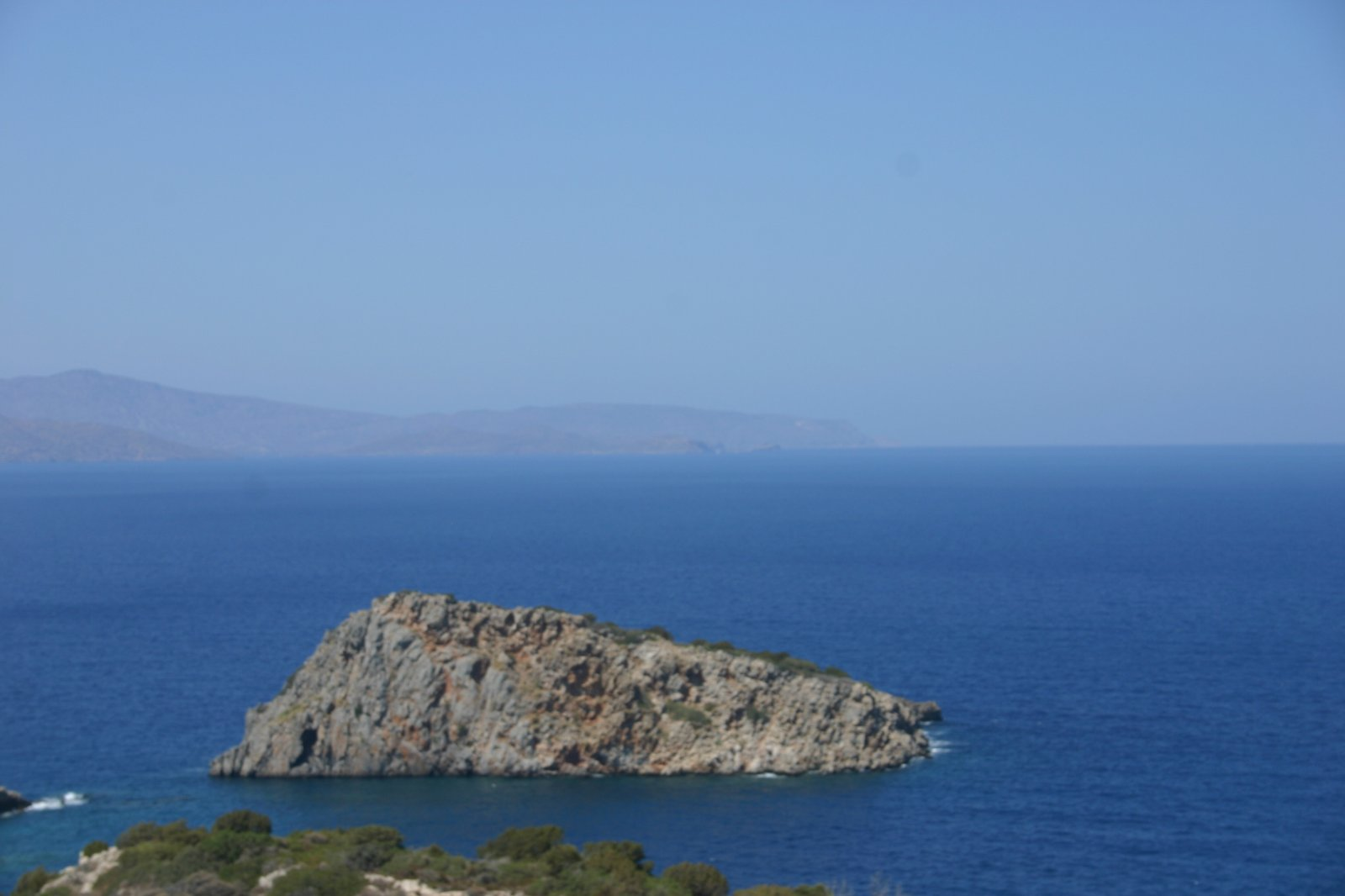
- The islet of Vryonisi, also known as Prasonisi

- Location within Greece

Geography
- Location: Aegean Sea
- Coordinates: 35.1297°N 25.7628°E
- Archipelago: Cretan Islands

Administration
- Greece
- Region: Crete
- Regional unit: Lasithi

Demographics
- Population: 0 (2026)

Vryonisi, also known as Prasonisi, is an uninhabited Greek islet in the Aegean Sea, close to the northern coast of eastern Crete in Mirabello Bay. Inscriptions and a sketch dating to Antiquity can be found chiseled on the island's rock face left by sailors probably seeking shelter from a squall. The inscription, consisting of their names and a dolphin, possibly symbolizing Poseidon, is probably a message expressing gratitude for their safe voyage.

== See also ==
- List of islands of Greece
