= Neapoli, Crete =

Neapoli Νεάπολη
- Municipal unit
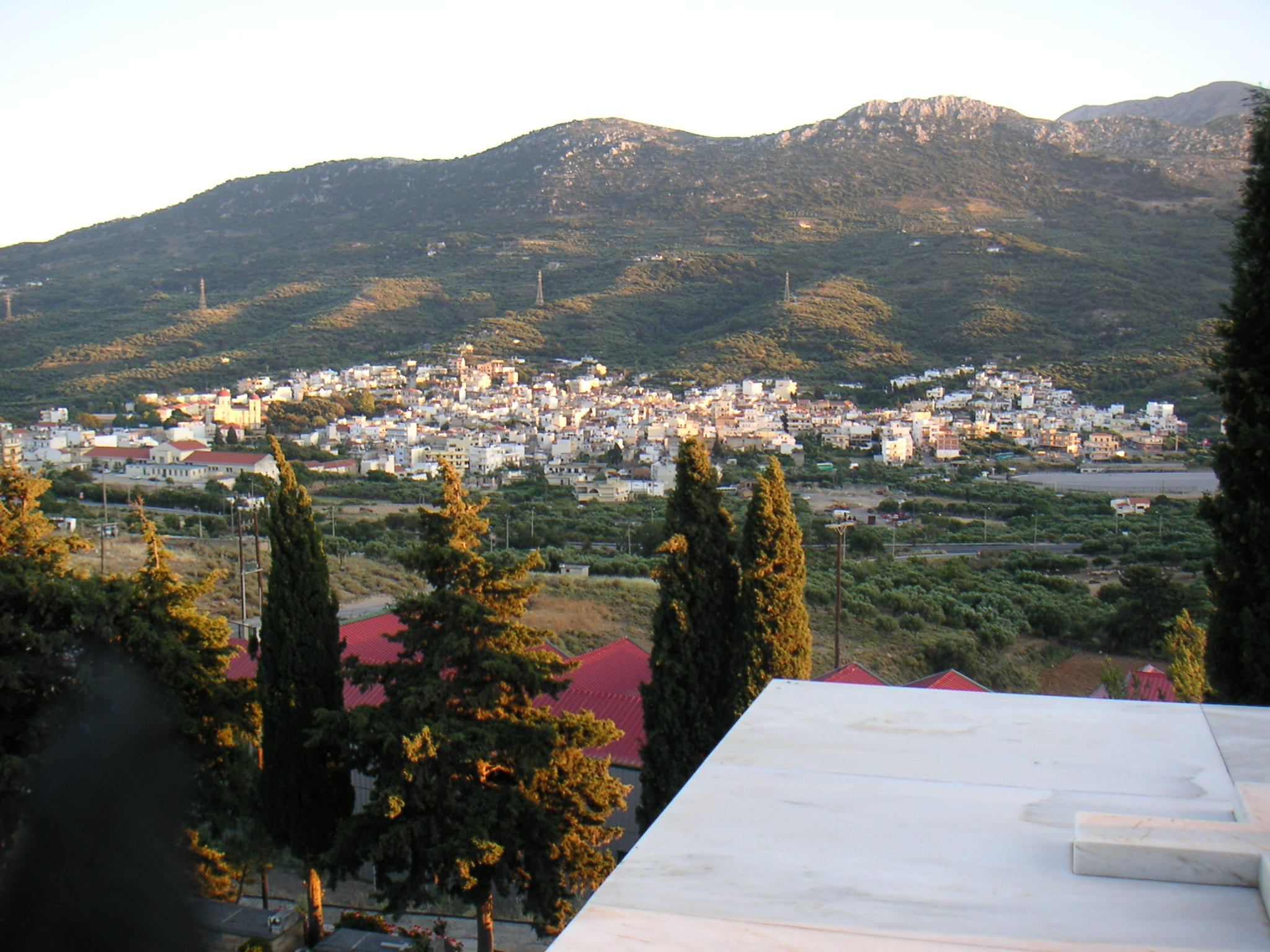
- View of Neapoli from its graveyard

- Location within the regional unit

- Location within Greece
- Coordinates: 35°17′N 25°36′E
- Country: Greece
- Administrative region: Crete
- Regional unit: Lasithi
- Municipality: Agios Nikolaos

Area
  - Municipal unit: 130.5 km^{2} (50.4 sq mi)
- Elevation: 260 m (850 ft)

Population (2021)
  - Municipal unit: 4,320
  - Municipal unit density: 33.1/km^{2} (85.7/sq mi)
  - Community: 2,889
- Time zone: UTC+2 (EET)
  - Summer (DST): UTC+3 (EEST)
- Postal code: 72400
- Area code: 28410
- Vehicle registration: AN
- Website: www.neapolinet.gr

Neapoli (Greek: Νεάπολη) is a small town and a former municipality in Lasithi, eastern Crete, Greece. Since the 2011 local government reform, it has been treated as a municipal unit of Agios Nikolaos. The municipal unit has an area of 130.450 km^{2} (50.367 sq mi). It is located 12 kilometres (7 miles) west from Agios Nikolaos in the green valley of Mirabello. The surrounding area is mountainous and home to a collection of native olive trees. Neapoli is a traditional Cretan town with narrow streets and cobbled roads. The Cathedral of the Virgin Mary (Megali Panagia) is located on the central square.

== History ==
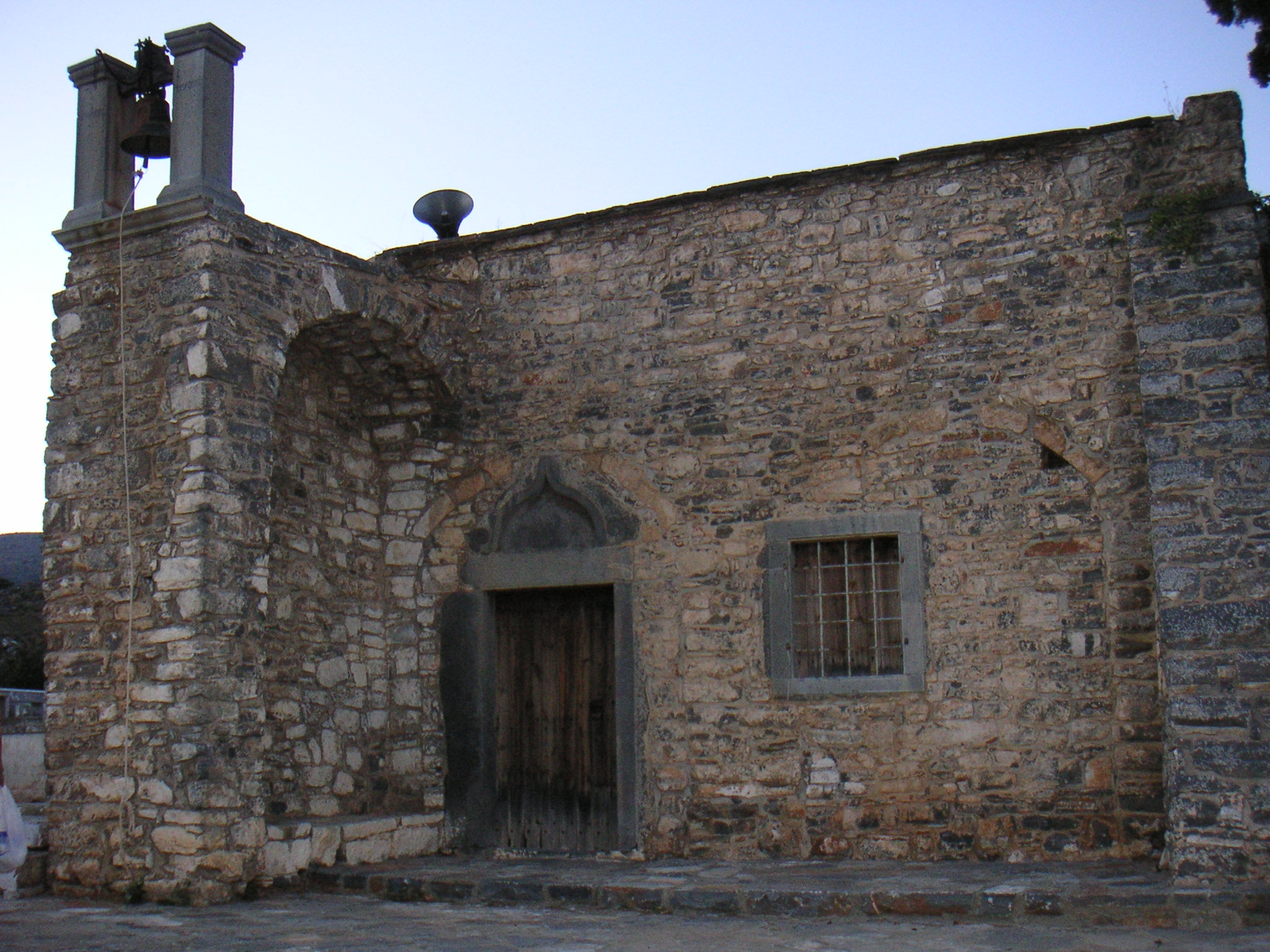
Photo of the "Metamorfosi tou Sotira" church in the town of Neapoli

The modern settlement at Neapoli was established during the period of Venetian rule on Crete under the name "New Village". When the seat of Lasithi Prefecture was moved there from Phourni, it was renamed Neapolis (Medieval Greek: Νεάπολις, "New City"). Under Turkish rule, this was calqued into Ottoman Turkish as Yeni Şehir (یڭی شهر) before returning to its Greek name after independence. Agios Nikolaos became the new seat of the prefecture in 1904.

== Annual festival ==
Annually on the 15th of August there is a holy festival dedicated to the Virgin Mary. The main square hosts musicians, traditional dancers, and a market. There are also some sports events including a cycling race around the hills of Lasithi. When it gets dark there is a procession of torches up the mountainside.

== Museum of Local History ==
There is a small museum of local history comprising mostly photographs and postcards of Neapolis.

== Local produce ==
The town is surrounded by olive trees. Olives and olive oil are a very important part of the local agricultural economy. There are also many almond trees. A traditional local product of Neapoli is a drink, made from almonds, called soumada. It is a very sweet almond-flavored, non-alcoholic, soft drink that can also be delicately flavored with flowers (providing variations of the aroma and the flavor).

== Local wildlife ==
Whilst walking around the hills surrounding Neapoli, apart from the usual tortoises, hare, goats, and xylophagidae (known more commonly in Greece as Tzitzikia), one can occasionally see eagles and scorpions. The scorpions are usually hiding under rocks.

== Notable residents ==
Antipope Alexander V (also Peter of Candia or Peter Phillarges, c. 1339 – May 3, 1410) was born in Neapoli. He reigned from June 26, 1409, to his death in 1410 and is officially regarded by the Roman Catholic Church as an antipope.
