= Chersonasus =

Ancient harbor town on Crete, Greece

Coordinates: 35°19′17″N 25°23′26″E

Chersonasus or Chersonasos (Ancient Greek: Χερσόνασος), later Chersonesus or Chersonesos (Χερσόνησος), was a town and polis (city-state) on the north coast of ancient Crete. It functioned as the harbour of Lyktos, and had a temple of Britomartis, According to the Stadiasmus Maris Magni, which spells that name Cherrhonesus or Cherronesos (Χερρόνησος), it had a harbour and was located 130 stadia from Herakleion and 260 stadia from Olus. By land, it was 16 M.P. from Knossos. In the fourth century BCE, it struck coins.

It was Christianised early, and the site of a bishopric. Michel Le Quien mentions four Greek bishops, from 441 to 789; the see still figures in later "Notitiae Episcopatuum" of the twelfth or thirteenth century. Seven Latin bishops are mentioned by Le Quien, from 1298 to 1549, of whom the last two, Dionysius and Joannes Franciscus Verdura, were present at the Council of Trent. Another bishop of Chersonesus was Pietro Coletti, at the beginning of the seventeenth century a Catholic, but whether of his native Greek Rite or of the Latin is unknown. No longer a residential bishopric, it remains a titular see of the Roman Catholic Church.

The site of Chersonasus is located near modern Limin Khersonisos.
