= Olous =

Human settlement in Greece

Coordinates: 35°15′28″N 25°44′20″E

Olous or Olus (Ancient Greek: Ὄλους, or Ὄλουλις) was a city of ancient Crete; now sunken, it was situated at the site of present day town of Elounda, Crete, Greece. According to the Stadiasmus Maris Magni, it had a harbour and was located 260 stadia (in the range of approximately 41 to 50 km or 25 to 31 mi) from Chersonasus and 15 stadia (approximately 2.4 km or 1.5 mi) from Camara.

== History ==
After continuing boundary disputes with the hillfort of Lato, the citizens of Olous eventually entered into a treaty with those of Lato. There was a temple to Britomartis in the city, a wooden statue of whom was erected by Daedalus, the mythical ancestor of the Daedalidae, and father of Cretan art. Her effigy is represented on the coins of Olous.

The Ptolemaic naval fleet commander Callicrates was honored by the citizens of Olous and received honorary citizenship.

== Present conditions ==
Archaeologists discovered ancient texts within the ruins linking the town with the ancient cities of Knossos and the island of Rhodes. The sunken city can be visited by tourists swimming in Elounda Bay. Today, the only visible remnants of the city are some scattered wall bases.

== See also ==
- List of ancient Greek cities
