= Vrachasi =

Vrachasi Βραχάσι
- Municipal unit
- Location within the regional unit

- Location within Greece
- Coordinates: 35°16′N 25°34′E
- Country: Greece
- Administrative region: Crete
- Regional unit: Lasithi
- Municipality: Agios Nikolaos

Area
  - Municipal unit: 63.4 km^{2} (24.5 sq mi)
- Elevation: 126 m (413 ft)

Population (2021)
  - Municipal unit: 1,903
  - Municipal unit density: 30.0/km^{2} (77.7/sq mi)
- Time zone: UTC+2 (EET)
  - Summer (DST): UTC+3 (EEST)
- Vehicle registration: AN

Vrachasi (Greek: Βραχάσι) is a village and a former municipality in the Lasithi regional unit, Crete, Greece. Since the 2011 local government reform it is part of the municipality of Agios Nikolaos, of which it is a municipal unit. The municipal unit has an area of 63.41 km^{2} (24.48 sq mi).

== Main sights ==
Vrachasi is a village of a few hundred people and typical of many around the area, but it has some interesting features and the traditional Cretan architecture is well preserved here. The main square of Vrachasi sits close to the road and has a wide view into the valley below, through which the main highway between Agios Nikolaos and Heraklion passes.

Vrachasi, like nearby Sisi and Milatos, has a reputation for local independence, and hand-painted signs reading "Dimos Vrachasiou" ("Municipality of Vrachasi") appear around the area.

== See also ==
- Sisi
