= Magasa, Crete =

Neolithic settlement in Greece

Coordinates: 35°09′6.39″N 26°11′5.58″E

Magasa (Greek: Μαγκασά) is a Neolithic settlement on the eastern part of the island of Crete in present-day Greece. Magasa is notable as a Neolithic Cretan settlement for some use of large room sizes in its multi-roomed residences. The ben-and-but style of housing design with some use of mud-dried brick has been noted as similar to that found in Neolithic Knossos.

== See also ==
- Lato
- Kydonia

== Sources ==
- British School at Athens, British School at Athens Managing Committee (1894) The Annual of the British School at Athens, Macmillan Publishers
- C. Michael Hogan, Knossos fieldnotes, Modern Antiquarian (2007)
- Arnold Walter Lawrence and Richard Allan Tomlinson (1996) Greek Architecture, Yale University Press, 243 pages ISBN 978-0-300-06492-6
