= Agios Nikolaos (municipality) =

Municipality on the Greek island of Crete

Agios Nikolaos Άγιος Νικόλαος
- Municipality
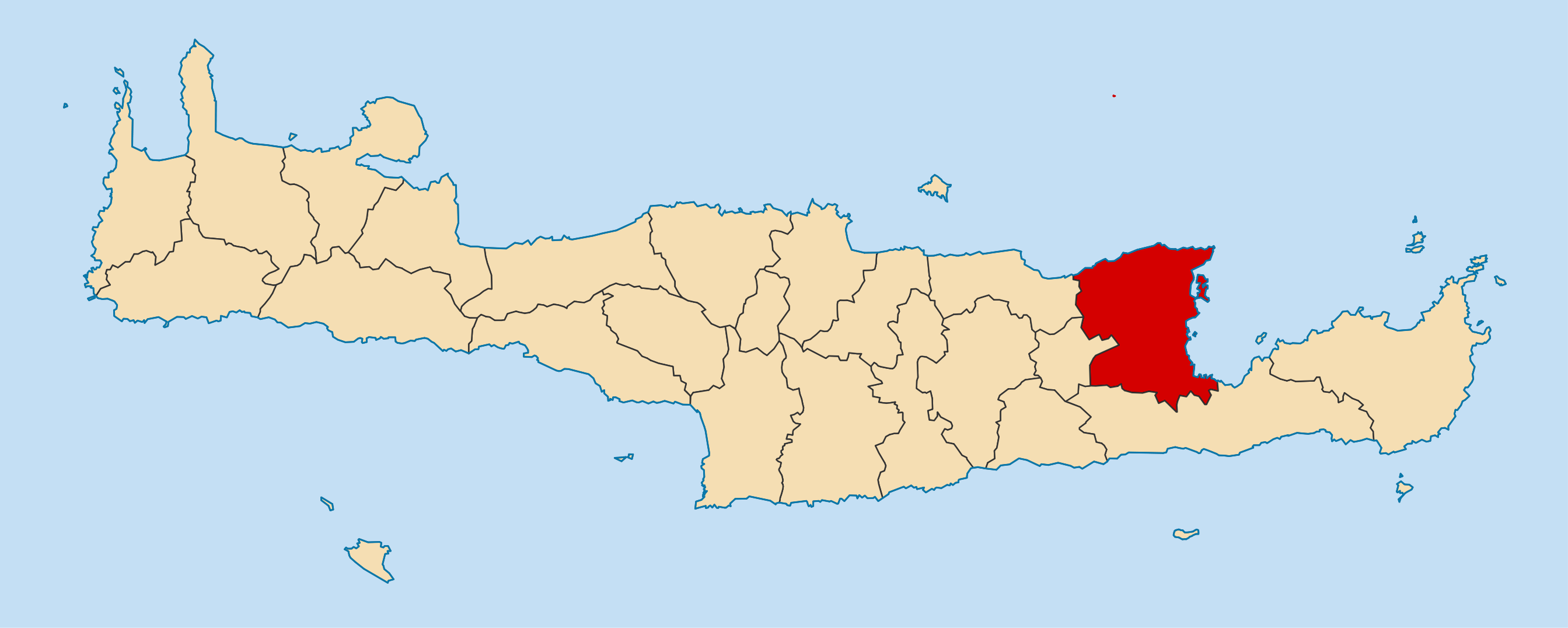

- Location within Greece
- Coordinates: 35°11′N 25°43′E
- Country: Greece
- Administrative region: Crete
- Regional unit: Lasithi
- Seat: Agios Nikolaos

Government
  - Mayor: Emmanouil Menegakis (since 2023)

Area
  - Municipality: 511.7 km^{2} (197.6 sq mi)
- Elevation: 21 m (69 ft)

Population (2021)
  - Municipality: 27,785
  - Density: 54.30/km^{2} (140.6/sq mi)
- Time zone: UTC+2 (EET)
  - Summer (DST): UTC+3 (EEST)
- Vehicle registration: ΑΝ
- Website: www.dimosagn.gr

The municipality of Agios Nikolaos ([ˈaʝ(i)os niˈkolaos] "Saint Nicholas"; Greek: Δήμος Αγίου Νικολάου) is a municipality located in the region of Crete, in Greece. The current municipality is the result of the merger in 2011 between the former municipalities of Agios Nikolaos, Neapoli and the community of Vrachasi, which became municipal units.

Its seat is the town of Ágios Nikólaos, its "historical capital" the town of Neapoli.

== History ==
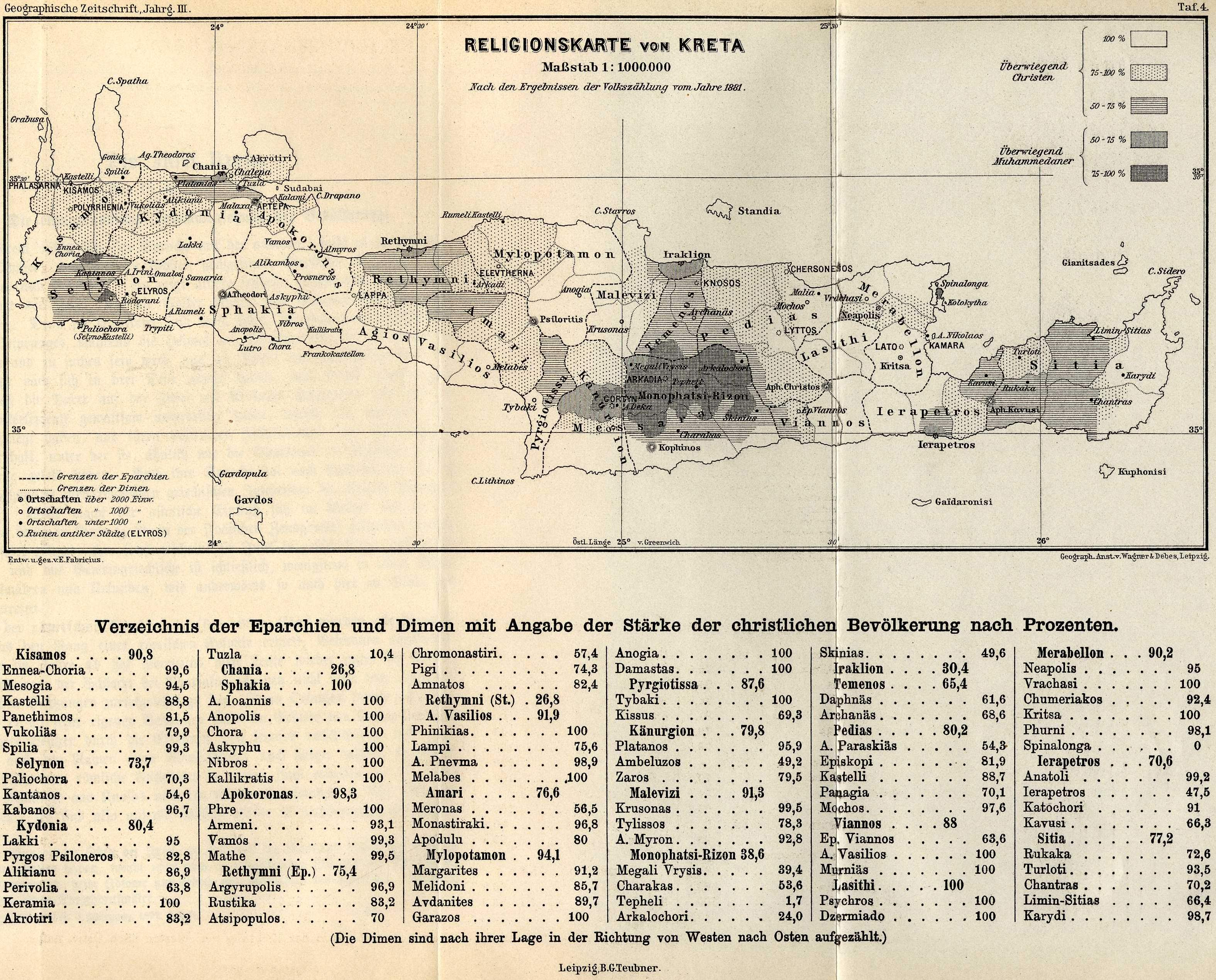
Results of the 1881 census

Already in the 19th century there was an Eparchy Mirambello (Greek: Μιραμπέλλο), the dimensions of which corresponded exactly to the current municipality of Agios Nikolaos. It was named after the Venetian fort Mirambello, which existed in the port town of Agios Nikolaos in the Middle Ages. However, the place was already meaningless at that time, which is why Kenourio Chorio, today's Neapoli, was chosen as the capital. Occasionally the district of Lasithi was also included in the eparchy. The Ottomans had settled Muslims from Turkey on the island with the aim of converting all of Crete to Islam. For this reason, censuses were carried out regularly.

=== 20th century to today ===
Since the independence of Crete, there has been a province Mirambello in the prefecture of Lasithi. While Agios Nikolaos became the prefectural capital, Neapolis became the administrative center of the province of Mirambello. As part of the municipal reform in 1997, the province was dissolved and all previous municipalities were incorporated into the two municipalities of Neapoli and Agios Nikolaos. In 2006, Vrachasi split off from Neapoli. In 2011, these three municipalities were downgraded to municipal units and merged into the municipality of Agios Nikolaos.

== Geography ==
The municipality of Agios Nikolaos was formed at the 2011 local government reform by the merger of the following 3 former municipalities, which became municipal units:

- Agios Nikolaos
- Neapoli
- Vrachasi

The municipality has an area of 511.694 km^{2} (197.566 sq mi), the municipal unit 317.834 km^{2} (122.716 sq mi).
