= Lato =

Ancient city in Crete

- Λατώ (Ancient Greek)
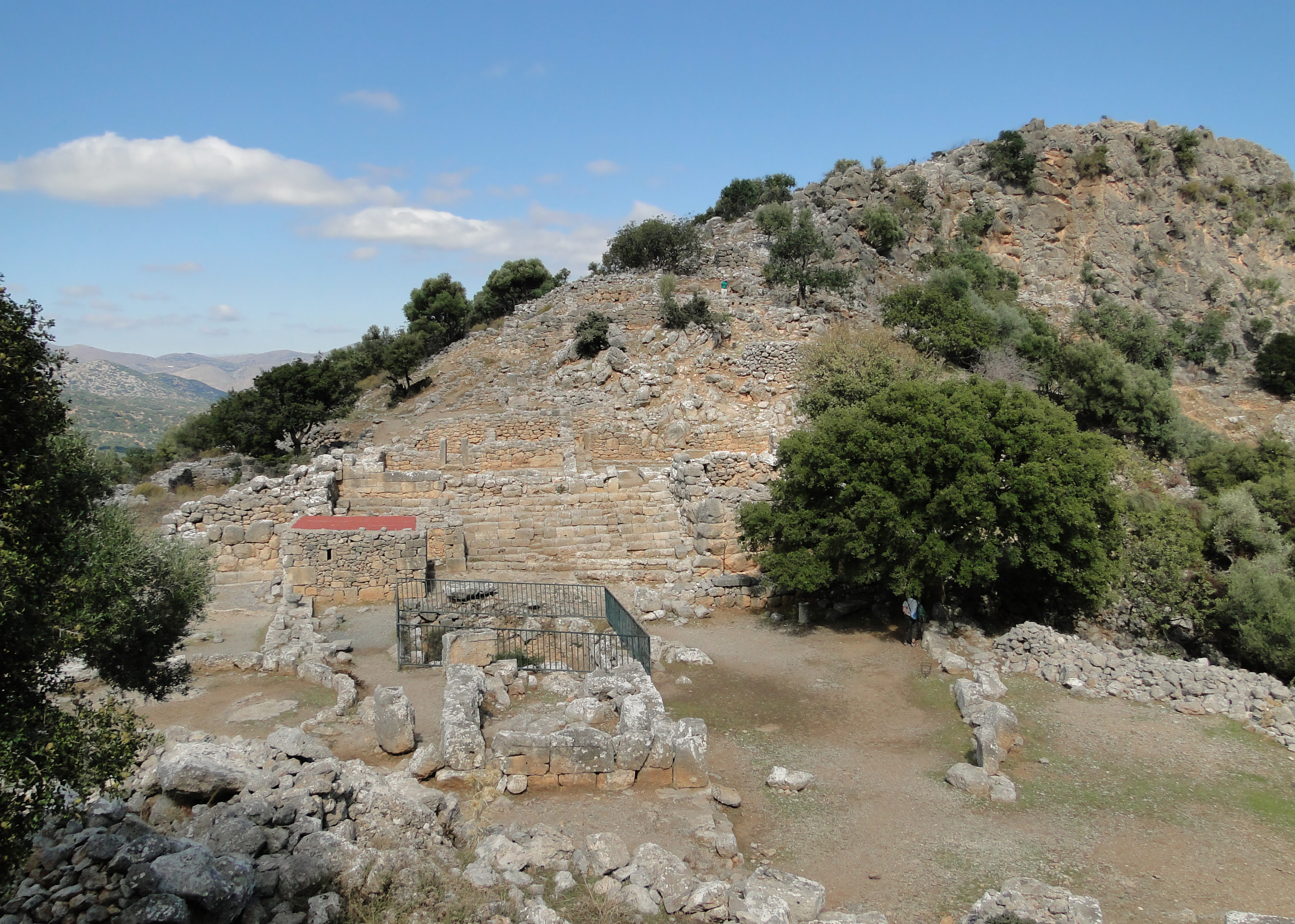
- The agora of Lato

- Location within Greece
- 35°10′40″N 25°39′13″E
- Type: Settlement
- Periods: Archaic Greece to Hellenistic Greece
- Location: Kritsa, Crete, Greece

History
- Abandoned: Approximately 200 BC

Site notes
- Management: 24th Ephorate of Prehistoric and Classical Antiquities
- Website: Lato

Lato (Ancient Greek: Λατώ, romanized: Latṓ) was an ancient city of Crete, the ruins of which are located approximately 3 km from the village of Kritsa.

== History ==
=== Iron Age ===
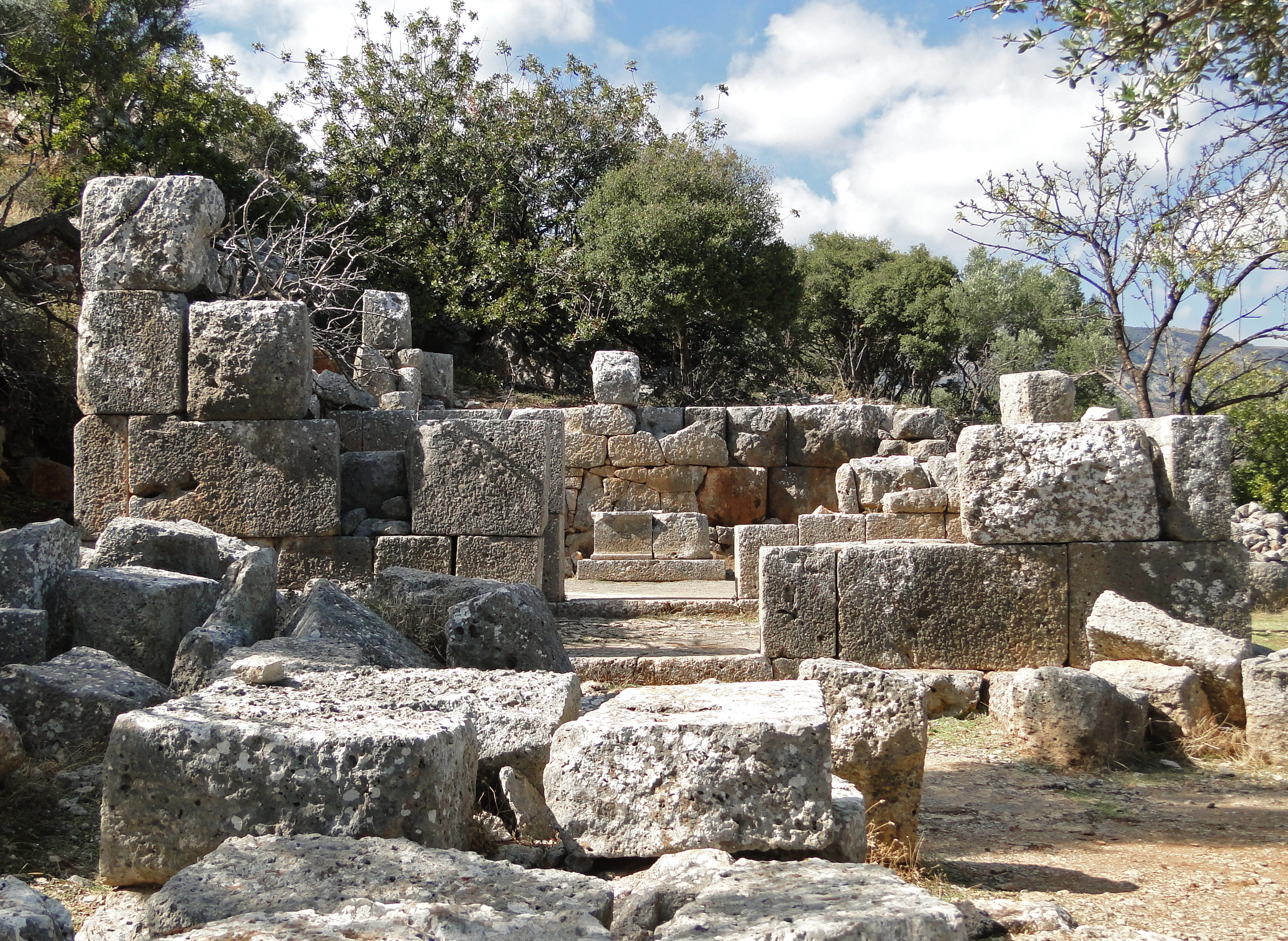
The Great Temple

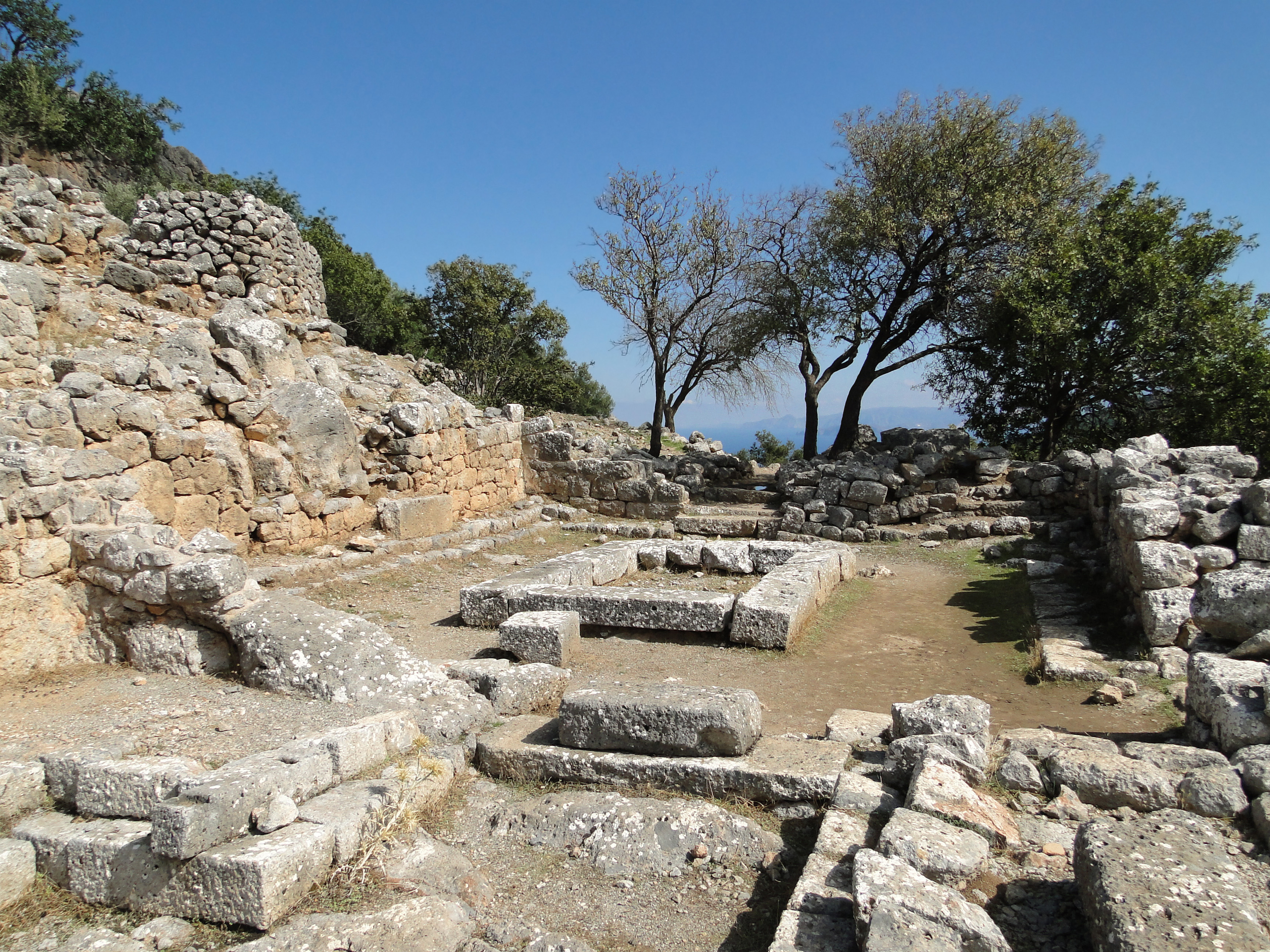
The eastern chamber of the prytaneion

The Dorian city-state was built in a defensible position overlooking Mirabello Bay between two peaks, both of which became acropolises to the city. Although the city probably predates the arrival of the Dorians, the ruins date mainly from the Dorian period (5th and 4th centuries BCE). The city was destroyed c. 200 BCE, but its port (Lato Etera or Lato pros Kamara), located near Agios Nikolaos was in use during Roman rule. This has led to the confusion: Stephanus of Byzantium, for example, quoted Xenion, a 3rd-century Cretan historian, repeating the latter's error that Kamara and Lato were one and the same. Modern scholarship distinguishes the two.

The city most likely was named after the goddess Leto (of which Lato is the usual Doric form) and may be mentioned in Linear B tablets as ra-to. Lato also minted coins in antiquity, bearing the likeness of the goddess Eileithyia who appears to have been the one particularly worshipped at Lato.

Nearchus, admiral of Alexander the Great, was born at Lato.

In 1894–1896, A. Evans conducted a small-scale investigation. Systematic excavation started in 1899–1901 by the French School of Archaeology, with J. Demargne, was resumed in 1968 by P. Ducrey, O. Picard, and B. Chatzimichali, and lasted until the 1970s.

== Overall site layout ==
=== General public accessibility ===
The site is accessible via the Epar.Od. Kritsas - Lakonion road and a limited area is accessible to the general public within a fenced space. For a small fee you may walk through the center of the city, with all other portions being fenced off. Only part of the site has been excavated. The center of Lato comprises the main gate, shops and workshops, portico, exedra, sanctuary, central cistern, prytaneion, Agora, Great Temple, theatral area, temple house, and the houses of the prytaneion. Limited information about the site is shown on public signs in both English and Greek.

== See also ==
- Lato pros Kamara
- Magasa
