= Xenion =

3rd-century Hellenistic author and historian

Xenion (Koine Greek: Ξενίων) was a third-century Greek historian. He was probably a native of Crete; the dates of his birth and death are not known.

He is known to have written works on the history of Crete and of Italy; he likely wrote histories of other lands as well. He is mentioned in the Etymologicum Magnum (c. 1150), and by two of its sources, Macrobius (fl. c. 400) and Stephen of Byzantium (6th century). Vossius includes Xenion in his De Historicis Græcis ('The Greek Historians', c. 1624).
