= Lasithi =

Lasithi Περιφερειακή ενότητα Λασιθίου
- Regional unit
- Municipalities of Lasithi

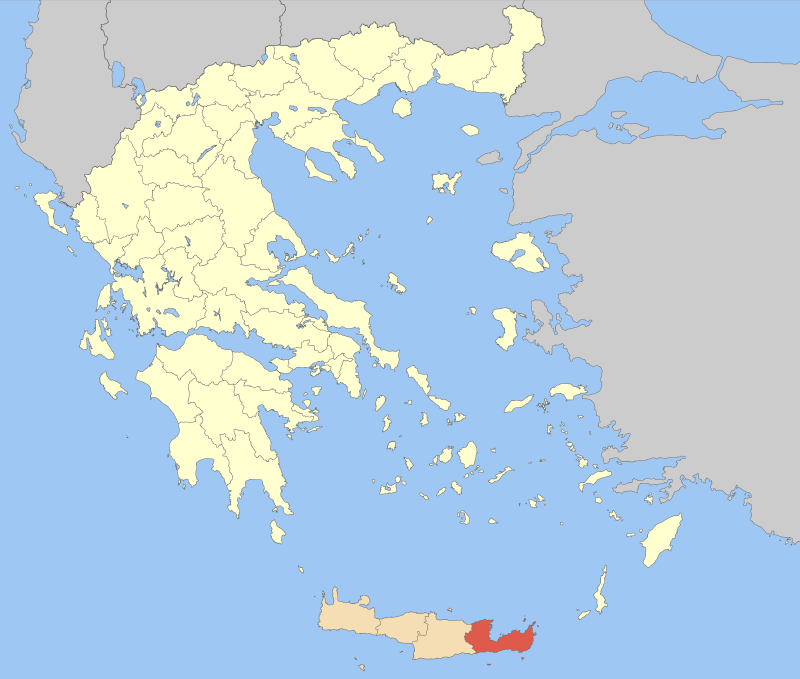
- Lasithi within Greece

- Location within Greece
- Coordinates: 35°05′N 25°50′E
- Country: Greece
- Administrative region: Crete
- Seat: Agios Nikolaos

Area
  - Total: 1,823 km^{2} (704 sq mi)

Population (2021)
  - Total: 77,819
  - Density: 42.69/km^{2} (110.6/sq mi)
- Time zone: UTC+2 (EET)
  - Summer (DST): UTC+3 (EEST)
- Postal code: 72x xx
- Area code: 284x0
- Vehicle registration: ΑΝ
- Website: www.lassithi.gr

Lasithi (Greek: Λασίθι) is the easternmost regional unit on the island of Crete, to the east of Heraklion. Its capital is Agios Nikolaos, the other major towns being Ierapetra and Sitia. The mountains include the Dikti in the west (reaching 2,148 metres), Selena in the north (reaching 1,556 metres), and the Thrypti in the east (reaching 1,476 metres). The Sea of Crete lies to the north and the Libyan Sea to the south.

To the east of the village of Elounda lies the island of Spinalonga, formerly a Venetian fortress and a leper colony. On the foot of Mount Dikti lies the Lasithi Plateau, famous for its windmills. Vai is well known for its datepalm forest.

Thanks to its beaches and its mild climate year-long, Lasithi attracts many tourists. Mass tourism is served by places like Vai, Agios Nikolaos and the island of Chrysi. More off-beat tourism can be found in villages on the south coast like Myrtos, Makrys Gialos or Makrigialos, Xerokambos and Koutsouras.

Lasithi is home to a number of ancient remains. Vasiliki, Fournou Korifi, Pyrgos, Zakros and Gournia are ruins of Minoan date, Lato and Itanos were Doric towns.

== History ==
The history of Lasithi can be traced over at least three millennia. The region has considerable ancient history antecedents, including the Dorian era settlement of Olous and Lato.

== Name ==
It has been speculated that ra-su-to, found in Linear B, corresponds to an unattested ancient Lasynthos. There is also a Lyttian tribal name Lasynthioi, presumably reflecting the same name.

Earlier proposals that it is derived from a Venetian 'la' preposed to derivatives of Lyttos (Lyttus > Tselyttus > Tselethe > Xeethe > La Xeethi > Lasithi) or Sitia (Sitia > La Sitia > Lasithi) are unlikely, as the name Lasithi was attested as early as 1211, whereas the Venetians only first arrived in Crete in 1205. Another unlikely etymology derives it from lakkos 'hole or basin' (Lakkos > Lakkidion > Latsidi > Lasidi > Lasithi).

The area was known as Laşid (Ottoman Turkish: الشيد) under Turkish rule.

== Administration ==
The regional unit Lasithi is subdivided into four municipalities. These are (number as in the map in the infobox):

- Agios Nikolaos (1)
- Ierapetra (2)
- Oropedio Lasithiou (3)
- Siteia (4)

=== Prefecture ===
As a part of the 2011 Kallikratis government reform, the regional unit Lasithi was created out of the former prefecture of Lasithi (Greek: Νομός Λασιθίου), which was created while Crete was still an autonomous state and was retained after the island joined Greece in 1913. The prefecture had the same territory as the present regional unit, except Viannos area that belonged to Lasithi but was annexed to Heraklion prefecture in 1932. At the same time, the municipalities were reorganised, according to the table below.

New municipality	Old municipalities	Seat
Agios Nikolaos	Agios Nikolaos	Agios Nikolaos
Agios Nikolaos	Vrachasi	Agios Nikolaos
Agios Nikolaos	Neapoli	Agios Nikolaos
Ierapetra	Ierapetra	Ierapetra
Ierapetra	Makry Gialos	Ierapetra
Oropedio Lasithiou	Oropedio Lasithiou	Tzermiado
Siteia	Siteia	Siteia
Siteia	Itanos	Siteia
Siteia	Lefki	Siteia

=== Provinces ===
Before 2006, Lasithi was divided into 4 provinces:

- Province of Mirambelos - Neapolis
- Province of Lasithi - Tzermiado
- Province of Ierapetra - Ierapetra
- Province of Sitia - Sitia

== Transport ==
The EO90, part of the E75, is the only national road in the regional unit. Lasithi Provincial Road 20 connects the EO90 with Ierapetra, towards Viannos.

== See also ==
- Ieropotamos River
- 2021 Lasithi earthquake
