= Agios Nikolaos, Crete =

Town on island of Crete in Greece

Agios Nikolaos Άγιος Νικόλαος
- Municipal unit
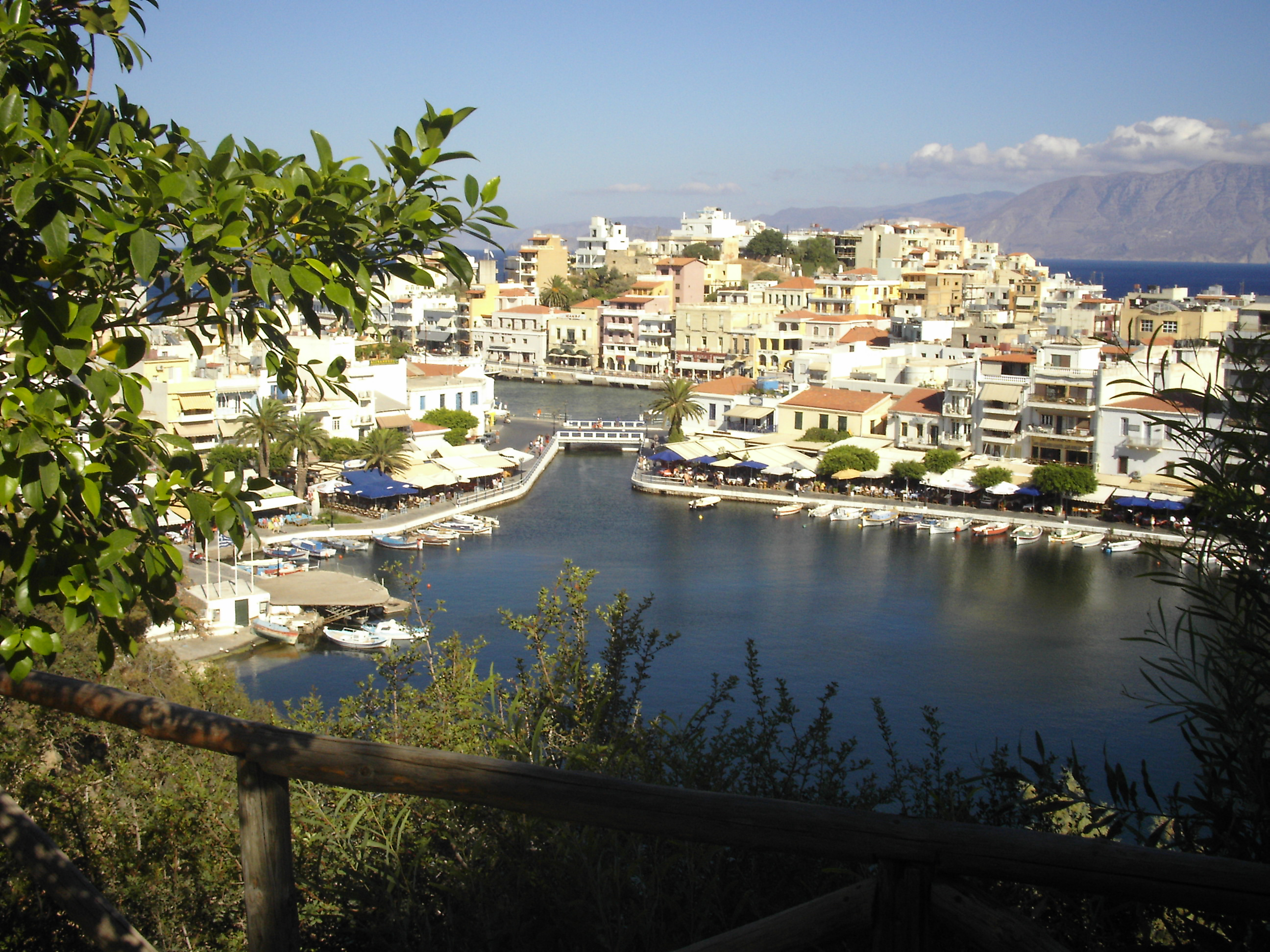
- Lake Voulismeni, Agios Nikolaos

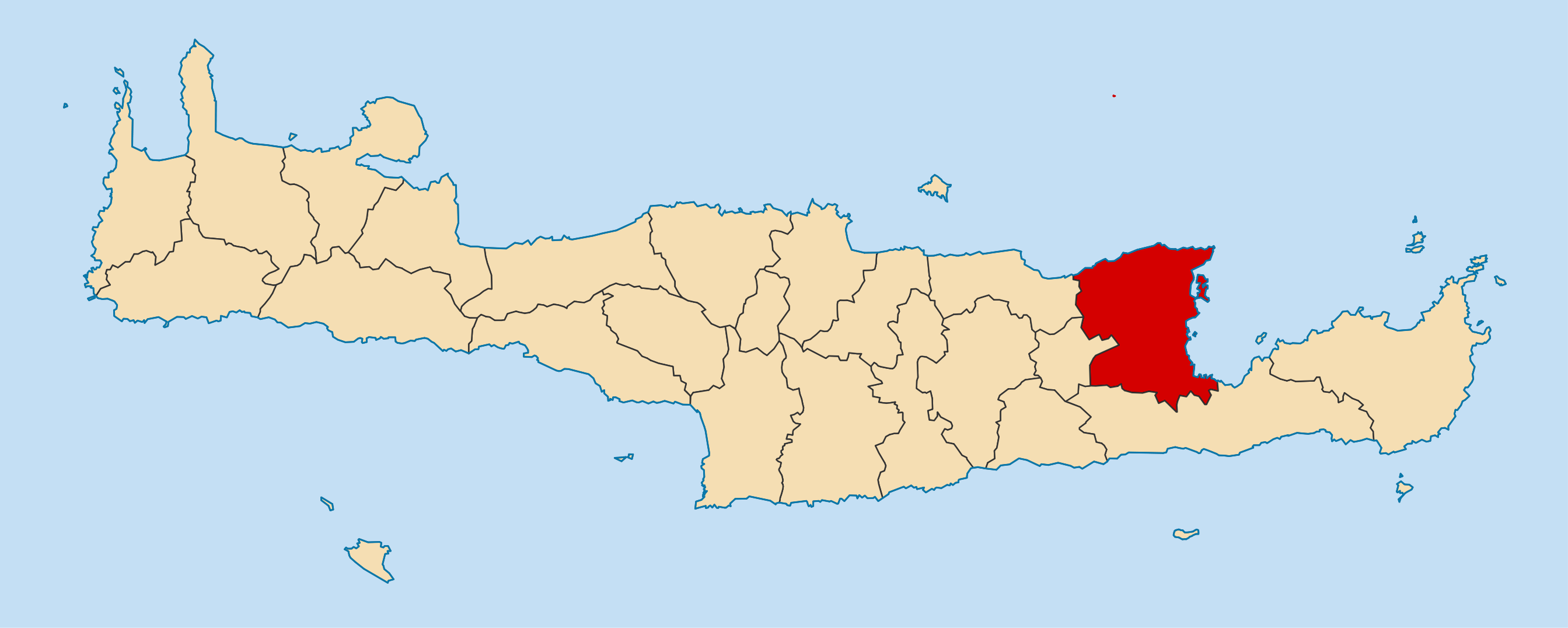

- Location within Greece
- Coordinates: 35°11′N 25°43′E
- Country: Greece
- Administrative region: Crete
- Regional unit: Lasithi
- Municipality: Agios Nikolaos

Area
  - Municipal unit: 317.8 km^{2} (122.7 sq mi)
- Elevation: 21 m (69 ft)

Population (2021)
  - Municipal unit: 21,562
  - Municipal unit density: 67.85/km^{2} (175.7/sq mi)
  - Community: 13,605
- Time zone: UTC+2 (EET)
  - Summer (DST): UTC+3 (EEST)
- Postal code: 721 00
- Area code: 28410
- Vehicle registration: ΑΝ
- Website: www.dimosagn.gr

Agios Nikolaos (Greek: Άγιος Νικόλαος [ˈaʝ(i)os niˈkolaos]) is a coastal town on the Greek island of Crete, lying east of the island's capital Heraklion, north of the city of Ierapetra and west of the city of Sitia. It is the capital of the Lasithi regional unit.

In 2021, the Municipality of Agios Nikolaos, which encompasses several surrounding villages, had 27,785 inhabitants, of whom 13,605 lived in the town. The town sits partially upon the ruins of the ancient city of Lato pros Kamara.

== History ==
Agios Nikolaos was settled in the late Bronze Age by Dorian occupants of Lato, at a time when the security of the Lato hillfort became a lesser concern and easy access to the harbour at Agios Nikolaos became more important.

The name Agios Nikolaos means Saint Nicholas. Its stress lies on the second syllable of the word "Nikolaos". Agios Nikolaos or Ayios Nikolaos (alternative romanizations of the Greek Άγιος Νικόλαος) is a common placename in Greece and Cyprus, since Saint Nicholas is the patron saint of sailors, and of Greece.

=== Archaeology ===
Lato pros Kamara, the ancient Agios Nikolaos, has left some limited ruins but an extensive cemetery of Roman times. Near the town is an archaeological site of ancient Priniatikos Pyrgos. It appears to have been first settled in the Final Neolithic era, circa 3000 BC. Activity on the site continued throughout the Minoan Bronze Age and the Classical Greek and Roman periods, spanning a total of up to 4,000 years. Since 2007, Priniatikos Pyrgos has been undergoing excavation by an international team under the auspices of the Irish Institute of Hellenic Studies at Athens.

== Culture ==
=== Modern Agios Nikolaos ===
Agios Nikolaos is a tourist town that serves as a hub to the twenty or so small villages and farms that make up that part of Lassithi. Tourist attractions include the small lagoon Lake Voulismeni, small beaches in the town, the tiny island of Agioi Pantes, the archaeological museum, the local flora exhibition “Iris” and numerous fairs.

Tourism is mainly West European, with Greek tourism concentrated in mid August, though there are a considerable number of Russian visitors in East Crete. The lagoon features a small park with a trail, traditional fishing boats, ducks, pigeons, an amphitheatre and many cafés. The modern city of Agios Nikolaos became internationally well known during the 1960s, when it was "discovered" by famous cinema directors (Jules Dassin, Walt Disney etc.), BBC producers and many others. It was then that the rapid tourist development of the area started. Among the various productions filmed were He Who Must Die, The Moon-Spinners, and the TV series The Lotus Eaters.

Daphne du Maurier's short story Not After Midnight was set in and around the town.

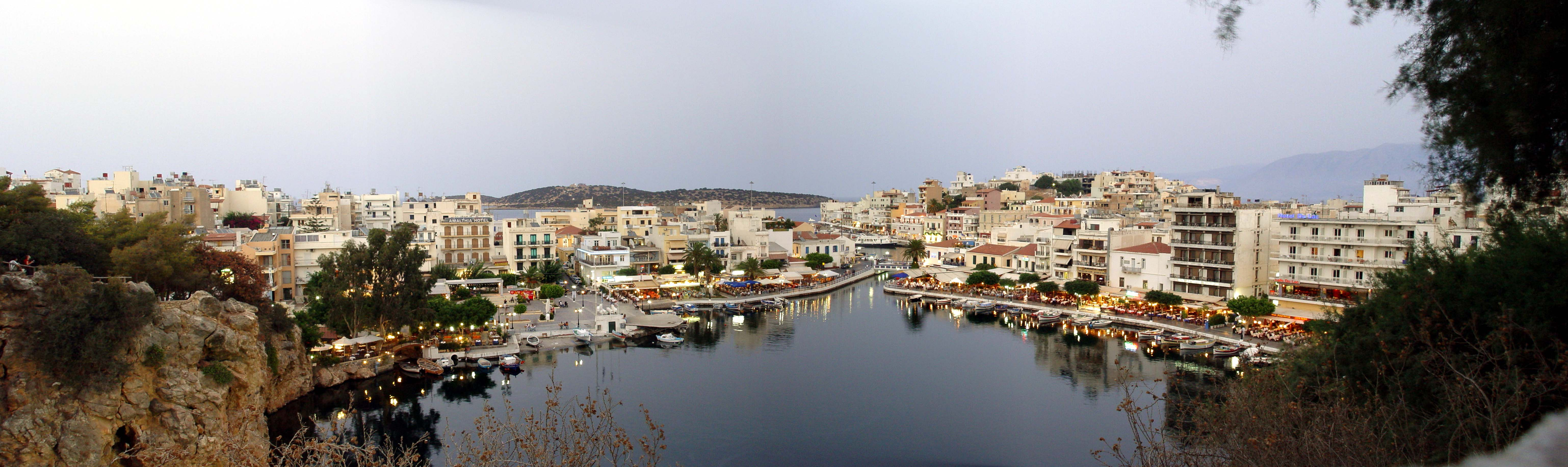
Panorama of the port

== Geography ==
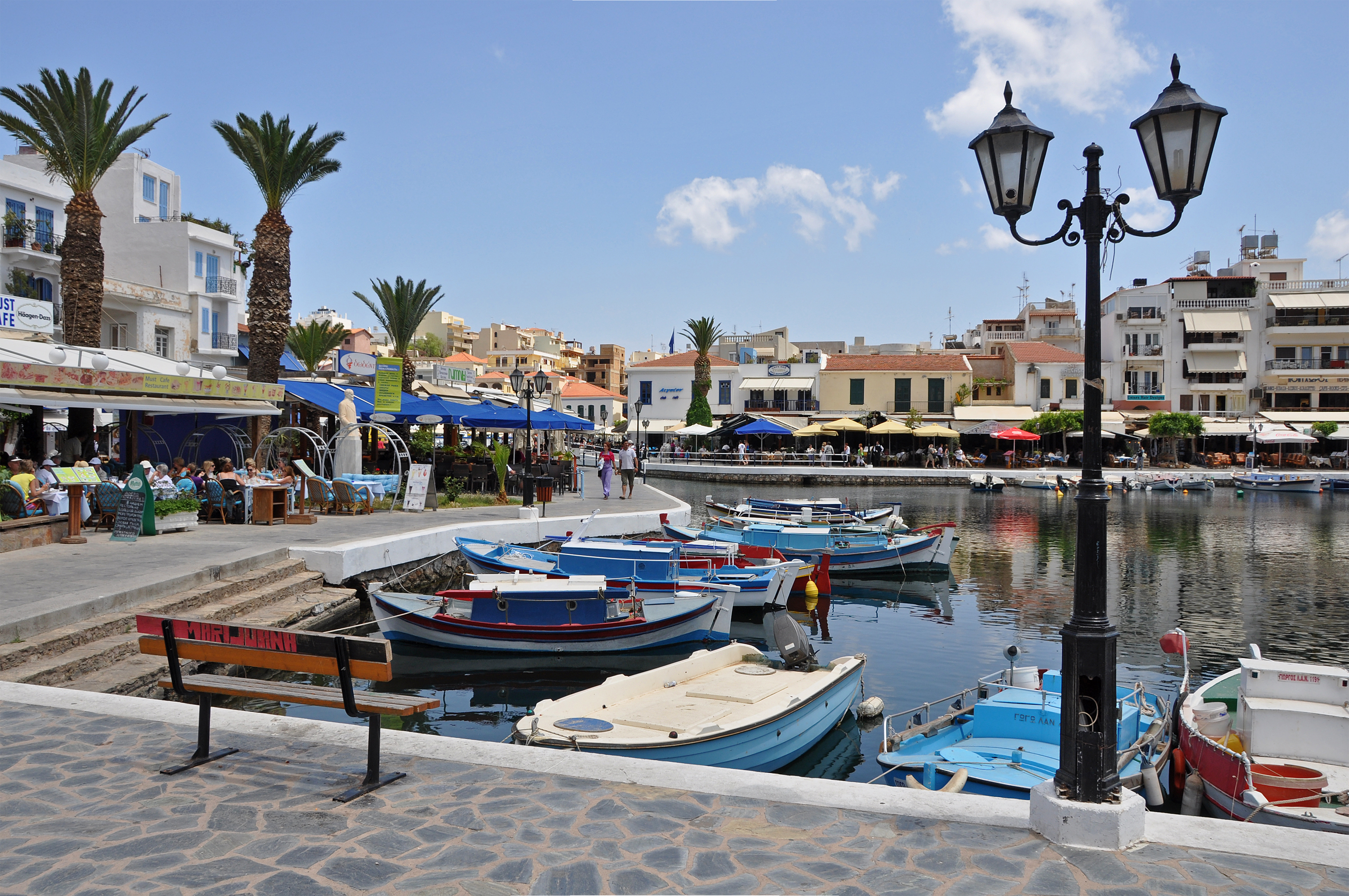
Old Port of Agios Nikolaos

=== Climate ===
Agios Nikolaos has a hot-summer Mediterranean climate (Köppen climate classification: Csa) with very mild, rainy winters and hot, dry summers.

Climate data for Agios Nikolaos (2010–2019)
Month	Jan	Feb	Mar	Apr	May	Jun	Jul	Aug	Sep	Oct	Nov	Dec	Year
Mean daily maximum °C (°F)	15.7 (60.3)	16.6 (61.9)	18.2 (64.8)	21.1 (70.0)	24.8 (76.6)	29.0 (84.2)	31.4 (88.5)	31.6 (88.9)	28.9 (84.0)	24.7 (76.5)	21.2 (70.2)	17.2 (63.0)	23.4 (74.1)
Daily mean °C (°F)	13.0 (55.4)	13.8 (56.8)	15.1 (59.2)	17.8 (64.0)	21.5 (70.7)	25.7 (78.3)	28.3 (82.9)	28.6 (83.5)	25.8 (78.4)	21.8 (71.2)	18.4 (65.1)	14.5 (58.1)	20.4 (68.6)
Mean daily minimum °C (°F)	10.2 (50.4)	11.0 (51.8)	12.0 (53.6)	14.4 (57.9)	18.1 (64.6)	22.3 (72.1)	25.1 (77.2)	25.5 (77.9)	22.6 (72.7)	18.8 (65.8)	15.6 (60.1)	11.8 (53.2)	17.3 (63.1)
Average rainfall mm (inches)	112.0 (4.41)	78.0 (3.07)	44.0 (1.73)	23.0 (0.91)	12.0 (0.47)	7.0 (0.28)	2.0 (0.08)	2.0 (0.08)	10.0 (0.39)	31.0 (1.22)	32.0 (1.26)	94.0 (3.70)	447 (17.6)
Source: National Observatory of Athens

=== Transportation ===
Agios Nikolaos is accessible from the mainland and the whole of Europe through Heraklion International Airport, and the many daily ferry services in Heraklion 64 kilometres (40 mi). Travellers pass through Sitia airport, boarding a domestic or charter flight, or through the town's harbour 67 kilometres (42 mi). Recently, the town became host to a department of the Hellenic Mediterranean university, offering tourism-related courses.

== Notable residents ==
- Mimis Androulakis (born 1951), politician
- Maria Damanaki (born 1952) politician
- Nikos Koundouros (1926–2017), film director

== See also ==
- Cretan cuisine
- Agios Nikolaos (disambiguation)
