= Corycus (disambiguation) =

Corycus may refer to:

- Corycus (alga), a brown alga genus in the family Chordariaceae
- Hayton of Corycus, medieval Armenian historian

places

- Corycus, a city of Cilicia Tracheia
- Corycus (Crete), a town of ancient Crete, Greece
- Corycus (Ionia), a town of ancient Ionia
- Corycus (Lycia), a city in Lycia
- Corycus (mountain), a mountain in Lydia
- Corycus (Pamphylia), a city in Pamphylia
- Gramvousa island off Crete, anciently known as Corycus
- Gramvousa Peninsula on Crete, anciently known as Corycus
