= Leucae =

Leucae or Leukae (Λεῦκαι) may refer to:

- Souda (island) and Leon (Souda Bay), islands off Crete
- Loches, France
- Leucae (Ionia), ancient city now located in Turkey
- Leucae (Laconia), ancient city of Laconia, Greece

== See also ==
- Leukai (disambiguation)
