= Karga (island) =

Greek island in the Aegean Sea

Native name: Κάργα
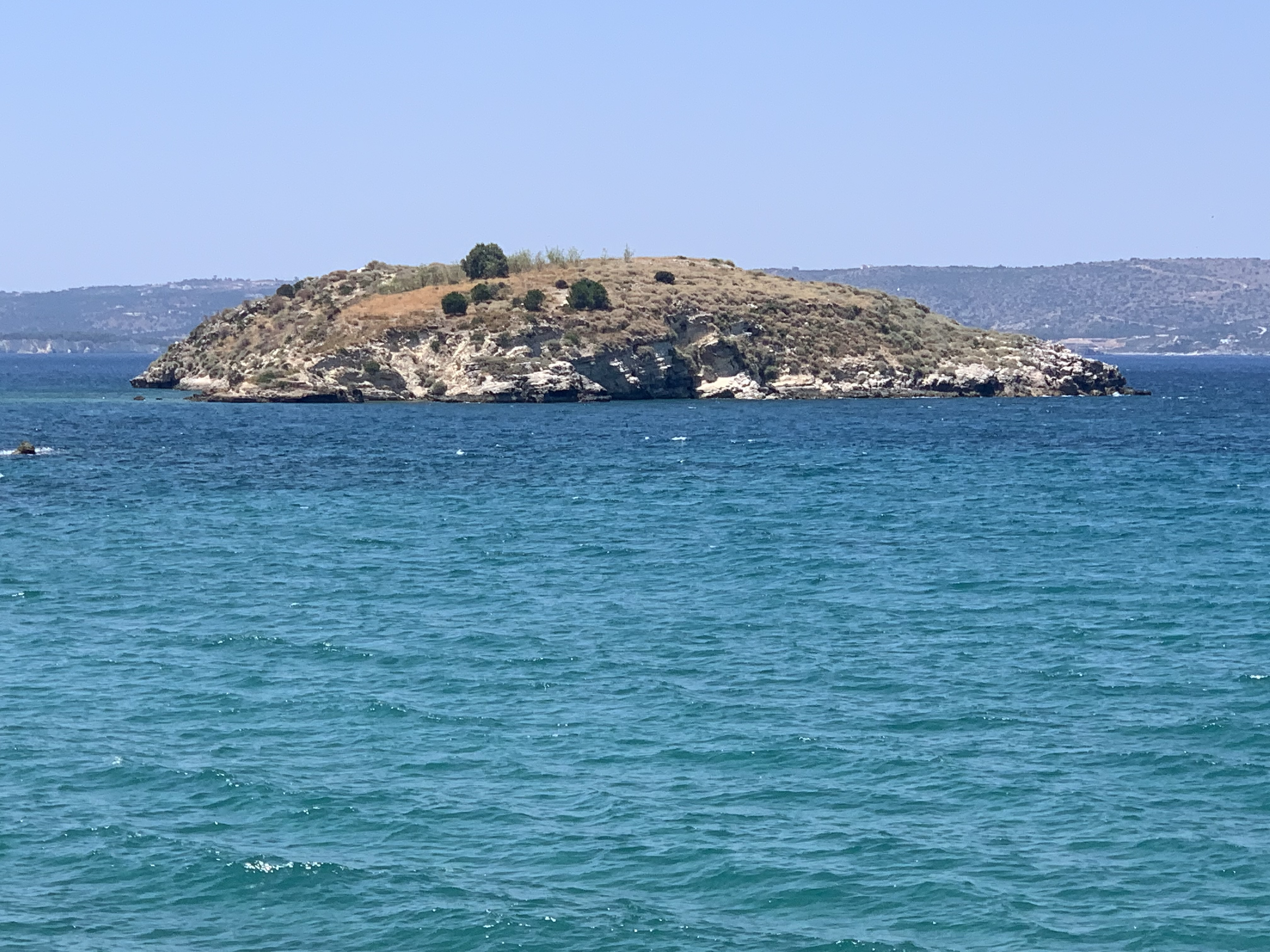
- The islet of Karga from Almyrida.

- Location within Greece

Geography
- Coordinates: 35.455°N 24.194°E
- Archipelago: Cretan Islands

Administration
- Greece
- Region: Crete
- Regional unit: Chania

Demographics
- Population: 0 (2001)

Karga (Greek: Κάργα), is an uninhabited islet close to the northern coast of Crete in the Aegean Sea. It is located in Souda Bay, east of the village of Almyrida and opposite the islets of Palaiosouda, Souda, and Leon. Administratively, it is within the municipal unit of Vamos within the municipality of Apokoronas, in Chania regional unit.

== See also ==
- List of islands of Greece
