= Leukai =

Leukai (Λεῦκαι) may refer to:

- Souda (island) and Leon (Souda Bay), islands off Crete
- Leucae (Laconia), town of ancient Laconia, Greece
- Leukai (Ionia), ancient city of Ionia, now in Turkey
- Osmaneli, Turkey

== See also ==
- Leucae (disambiguation)
