= Souda =

Souda Σούδα
- Municipal unit
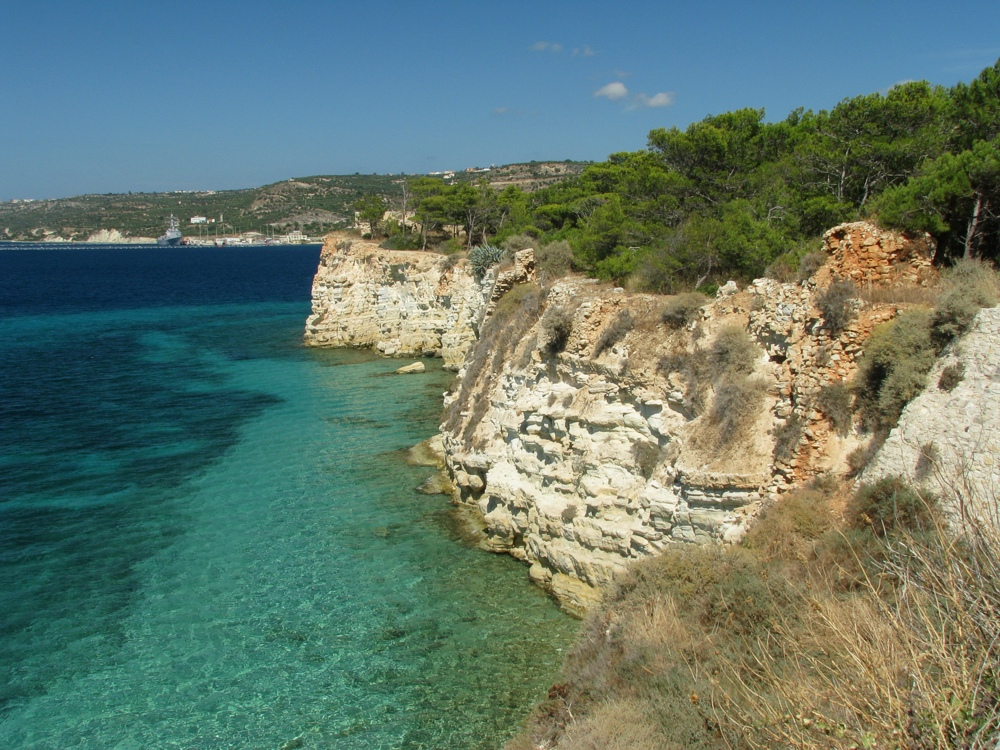
- The cliff of Souda bay

- Location within the regional unit

- Location within Greece
- Coordinates: 35°29′N 24°04′E
- Country: Greece
- Administrative region: Crete
- Regional unit: Chania
- Municipality: Chania

Area
  - Municipal unit: 22.0 km^{2} (8.5 sq mi)

Population (2021)
  - Municipal unit: 8,438
  - Municipal unit density: 384/km^{2} (993/sq mi)
  - Community: 6,225
- Time zone: UTC+2 (EET)
  - Summer (DST): UTC+3 (EEST)
- Vehicle registration: ΧΝ

Souda (Greek: Σούδα) is a town and former municipality in the Chania regional unit, Crete, Greece. Since the 2011 local government reform it is part of the municipality Chania, of which it is a municipal unit. The municipal unit has an area of 22.007 km^{2} (8.497 sq mi). It is an important ferry and naval port at the head of Souda Bay.

Souda is 6.5 kilometres (4.0 miles) to the east of central Chania, although the area in between is mostly built-up. The town is a relatively new settlement, built on what used to be salt beds and marshland. The Turks knew the area as 'Tuzla', their name for salt-beds. In the 1870s, they began to build a new settlement here which grew as the port expanded. Souda Bay is one of the deepest natural harbours in the Mediterranean and is easy to defend.

Now Souda is the arrival point for ferries from Piraeus. There is also a naval base located in Souda and across the bay, for NATO, with military accommodation and hospital in the town. Much of the command, particularly for US forces, is found across the bay on the Akrotiri. A grain silo overshadows the centre of town. Perhaps because of its nature as a working port and military town, it is not popular with tourists and can appear seedy, however, the central square was upgraded in 2020. It is well-served with shops of all types and some renowned fish restaurants in the old centre.

The Allied War Cemetery, mostly of soldiers from World War II, is found in Souda on the shore. There are 1,527 graves, mostly British with 447 New Zealanders and 197 Australians. Buried in the cemetery is the archaeologist John Pendlebury. Pendlebury was the curator at Knossos for the British School in Athens and had been continuing excavations in Crete until the war. He was executed by the Germans in 1941 whilst working for British Intelligence.

== Souda municipal unit ==
Souda was the main town in the former municipality of the same name, with the town hall found in Souda itself. This municipality was created in 1990 from the former community Souda, and was expanded with the former communities Kalami and Tsikalaria in 1997. At the 2010 Kallikratis reform, the municipality opf Souda was absorbed into the municipality of Chania, of which it became a municipal unit. The municipal unit is subdivided into the communities Souda, Aptera and Tsikalaria.

The municipal unit extends from Chania's hinterland (Souda and Tsikalaria) along the coast, taking in the villages of Kalami and Aptera. Around 8,400 people live in the municipal unit, the majority in Souda itself. Due to the area's beautiful views across the sea and up to the White Mountains and its proximity to Chania, there is a great deal of pressure to build new houses and apartments. However, there has been some protection afforded by the restrictions of having a military base in the area.

== Sinking of HMS York during WWII ==
During World War II, the Royal Navy heavy cruiser HMS York was disabled at Souda Bay by two Italian explosive motorboats (Italian: barchini esplosivi) of the Italian Decima Flottiglia MAS, launched by destroyers Crispi and Sella on 26 March 1941. Six motorboats entered the bay, led by Lieutenant Luigi Faggioni, and attacked three targets in pairs; the first was York, second the tanker Pericles and last another ship at anchor. Three of the attacking craft had various problems, either mechanical or human, due to the extreme temperature conditions, but the other three successfully attacked their targets. Two motorboats, packed with 330-kilogramme (667 lb) charges in the bows, struck York amidships, flooding both boiler rooms and one engine room. Two seamen were killed.

== Gallery ==
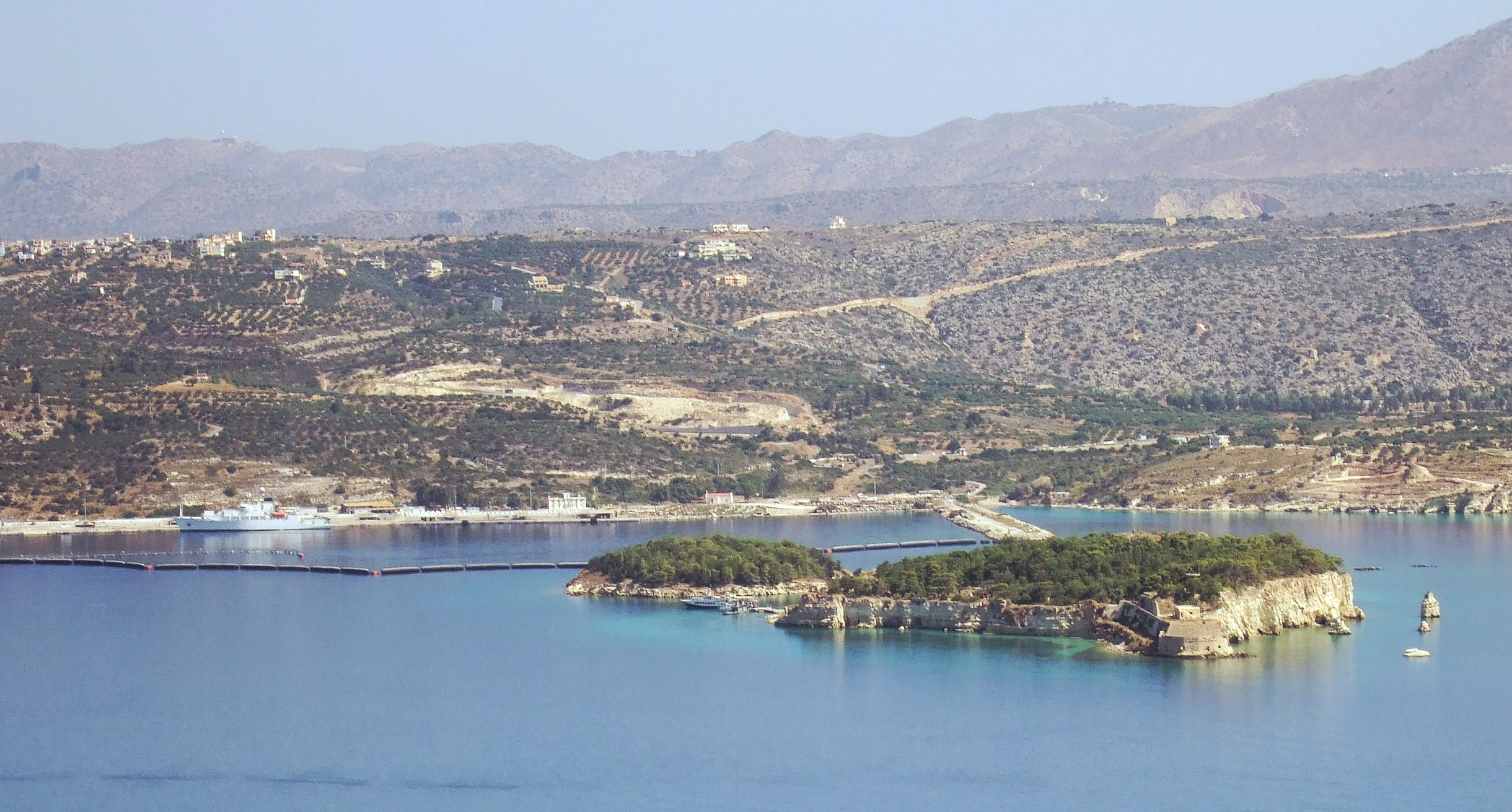
The islet of Souda, to the right of a smaller islet called Leon, within Souda Bay.

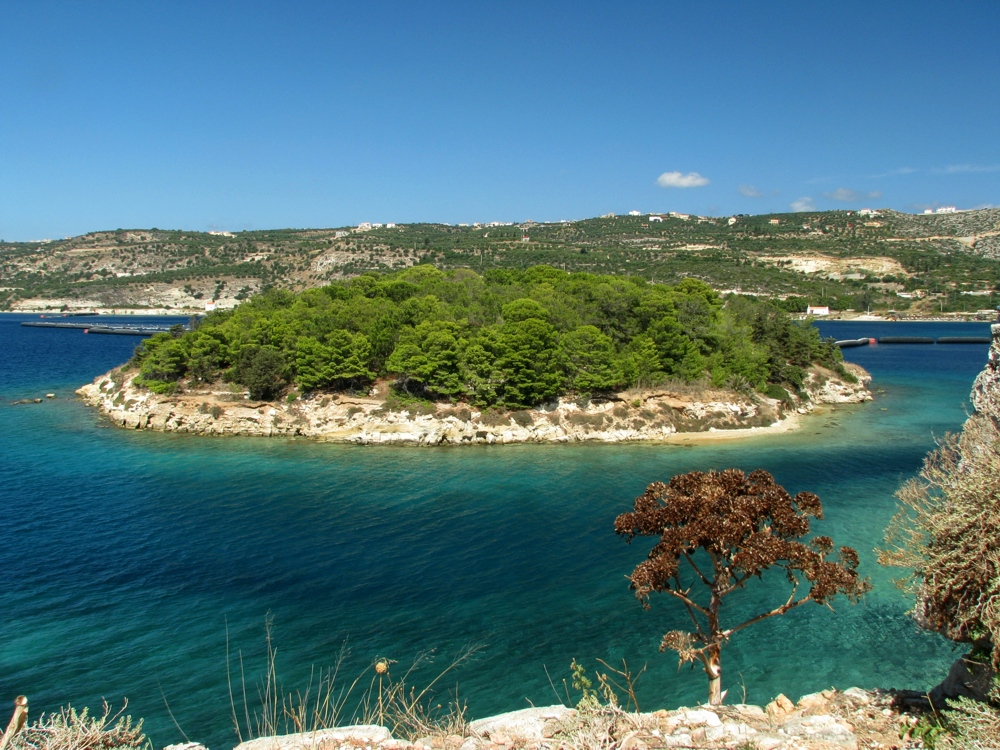
View of the islet of Leon, from the Venetian fortifications on the islet of Souda, within Souda Bay.

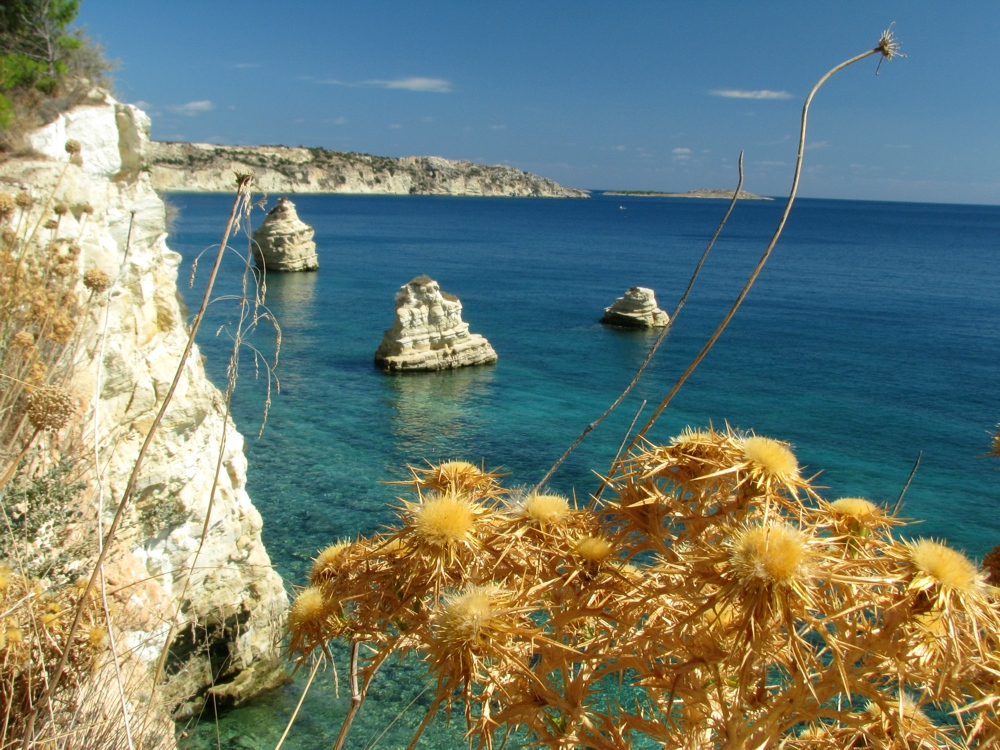
View from the walls of the Souda fortress.
