= Karga =

Karga may refer to:

- a ship in Wing Commander: False Colors
- Karga (island), in Greece
- Karga, Iran, a village in East Azerbaijan Province, Iran
- Karga, Çerkeş
