= NAMFI =

NAMFI can refer to:

- Namibian Maritime and Fisheries Institute, Namibia
- NATO Missile Firing Installation, Crete, Greece
