= Dudley Perkins (soldier) =

New Zealand Military Forces soldier

- Born: Dudley Churchill Perkins; 23 February 1915; Christchurch, New Zealand
- Died: 25 February 1944 (aged 29); Lakkoi, Crete, Greece
- Burial place: Souda Bay War Cemetery
- Military career
- Allegiance: New Zealand
- Branch: New Zealand Military Forces
- Rank: Staff Sergeant
- Nicknames: Kiwi Perkins, Vasili
- Units: 4th Battalion, Royal Regiment of New Zealand Artillery
- Conflicts: World War II

Dudley Churchill Perkins (23 February 1915 – 25 February 1944), also known as Kiwi Perkins, was a New Zealand soldier who fought in Greece during World War II and participated in the Cretan resistance.

== Biography ==
Perkins was born in Christchurch, Canterbury, New Zealand to mother Adelaide Agnes Perkins (née Perry) and father Reverend John Perkins.

Serving with the rank of Staff Sergeant in the 4th Field Regiment, New Zealand Artillery, Perkins was among the British Commonwealth troops that were evacuated to Crete after the German invasion of Greece in April 1941. He was captured by the Germans after the Battle of Crete but managed to escape in two weeks. After spending a year hiding in the mountains of Western Crete, he departed to Egypt on board a Greek submarine. During the time he spent on the island, he was impressed by the Cretans' assistance to him. Upon reaching Egypt, he joined the Special Operations Executive and returned to Crete as a SOE agent. On Crete, he was second-in-command to Major Xan Fielding. But unlike other agents who only served as liaisons, Perkins assembled his own guerrilla band and led it in many attacks against the Germans.

He became known as Vasili to the Cretans and Kiwi to the British, being well-respected for his courage. Perkins was killed in a German ambush near the village of Lakkoi and is buried in Suda Bay War Cemetery.

== See also ==
- George Psychoundakis
- Sandy Rendel
