= Gramvousa =

Two small uninhabited islands in north-western Crete, Greece

Imeri Gramvousa
Native name: Ήμερη Γραμβούσα
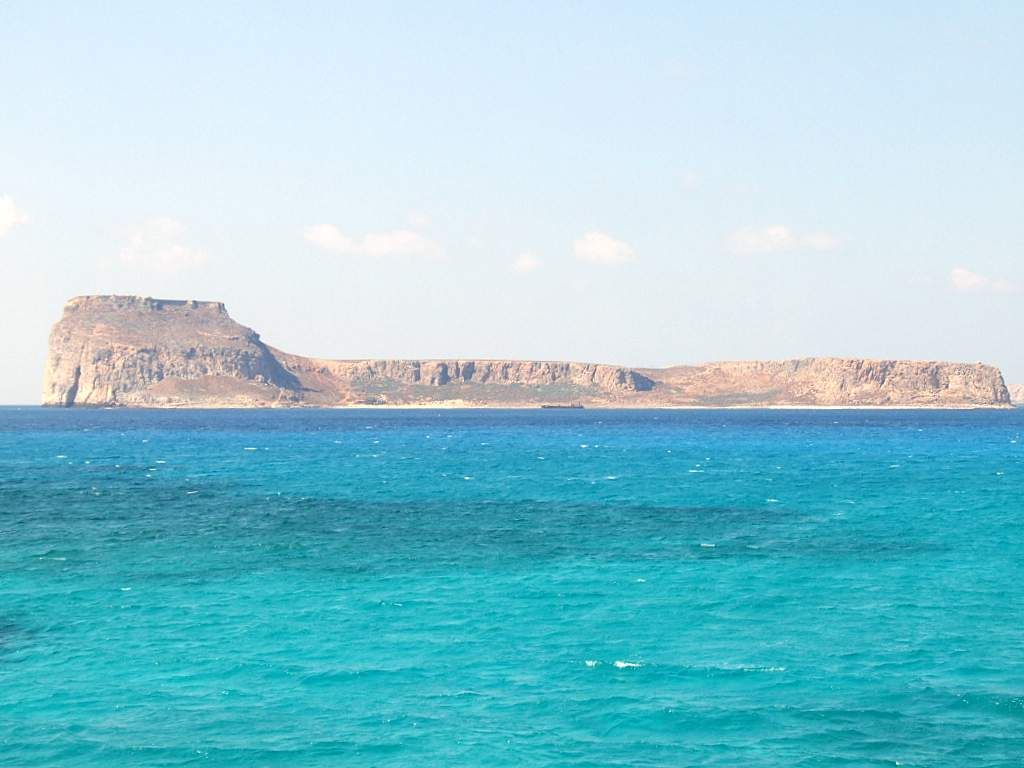
- Imeri Gramvousa
- Interactive map of Imeri Gramvousa

Geography
- Coordinates: 35°36′40″N 23°34′45″E
- Archipelago: Cretan Islands

Administration
- Greece
- Region: Crete
- Regional unit: Chania

Demographics
- Population: 0

Agria Gramvousa
Native name: Άγρια Γραμβούσα
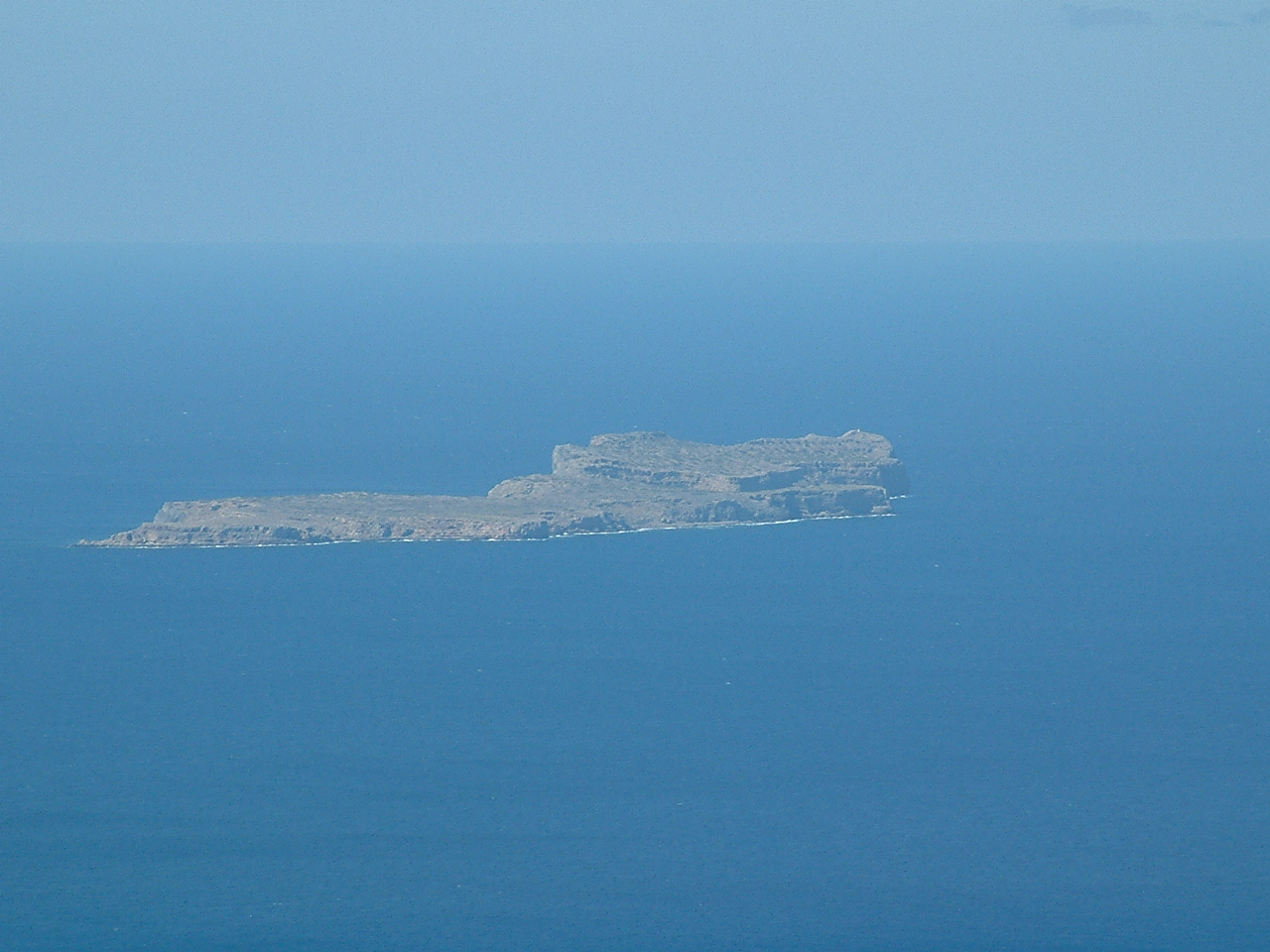
- Agria Gramvousa
- Interactive map of Agria Gramvousa

Geography
- Coordinates: 35°38′30″N 23°35′10″E
- Archipelago: Cretan Islands

Administration
- Greece
- Region: Crete
- Regional unit: Chania

Demographics
- Population: 0

Gramvousa, also Grampousa (Greek: Γραμβούσα or Γραμπούσα, further names include Akra, Cavo Buso, Cavo Bouza, Garabusa and Grabusa), refers to two small uninhabited islands off the coast of a peninsula also known Gramvousa Peninsula (Greek: Χερσόνησος Γραμβούσας) in north-western Crete in the regional unit of Chania. The Gramvousa Peninsula forms the more westerly of the two pairs of peninsulae in northwestern Crete (the other being Rodopos Peninsula), and is the western part of Kissamos Bay.

The Gramvousa islands are administered by the municipality of Kissamos.

== Naming ==
Imeri Gramvousa (Greek: Ήμερη Γραμβούσα), which translates to Tame Gramvousa, hosts the remains of a Venetian fort and the remains of buildings left behind by Cretan insurgents, who were compelled to live as pirates during the Greek War of Independence. Today, Imeri Gramvousa is a popular tourist attraction.

Agria Gramvousa (Greek: Άγρια Γραμβούσα), which translates to Wild Gramvousa, is much less hospitable and is located due north of Imeri Gramvousa. It has also been named False Gramvousa.

In ancient times the larger island was known as Korykos, which means leather bag. The island was named "Gramvousa" in honour of Vousa, the wife of a pirate chief and the only inhabitant of the island to evade capture when the pirates were forcibly removed.

== Ottoman–Venetian Wars ==
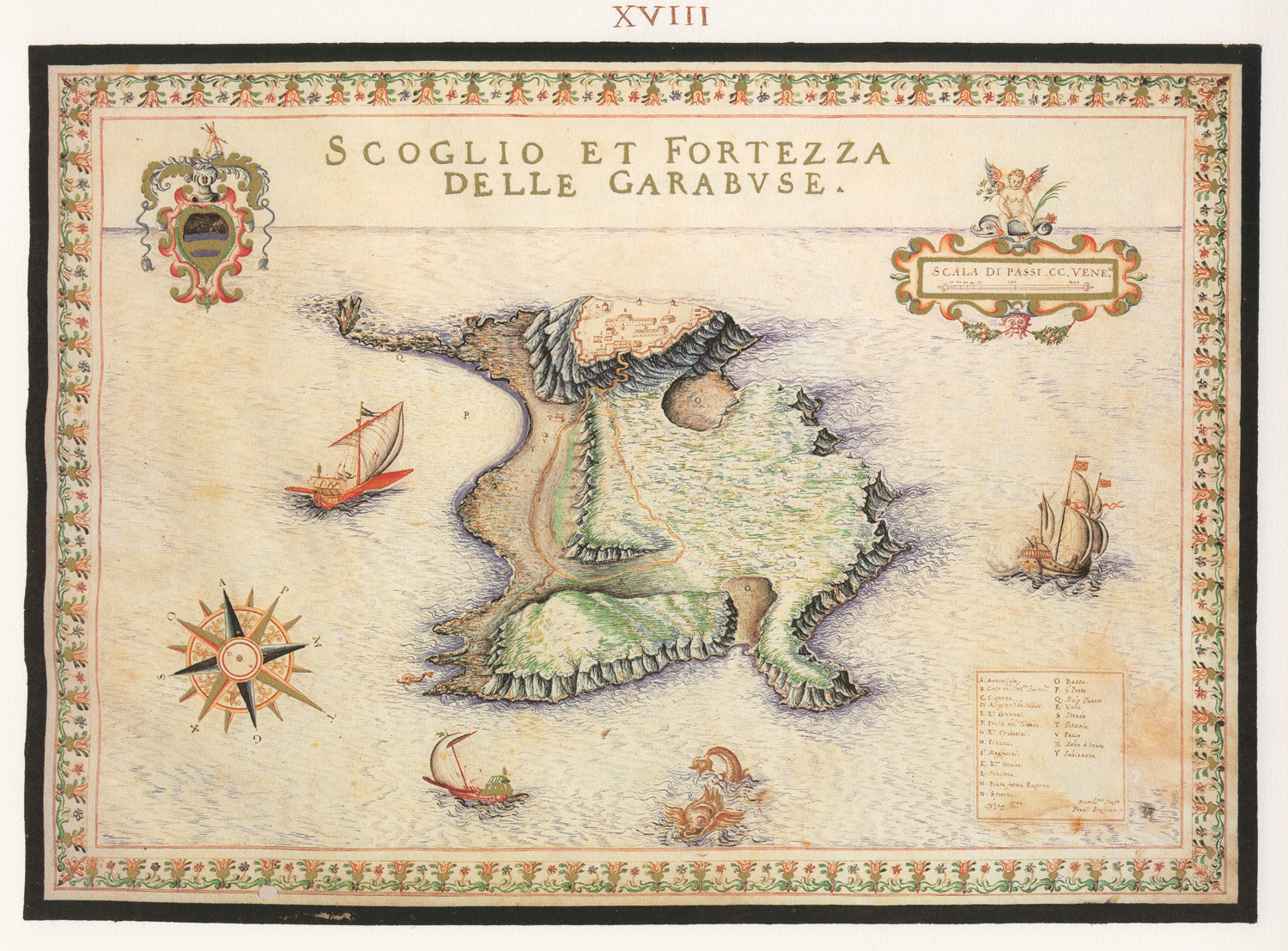
Imeri Gramvousa map by Basilicata

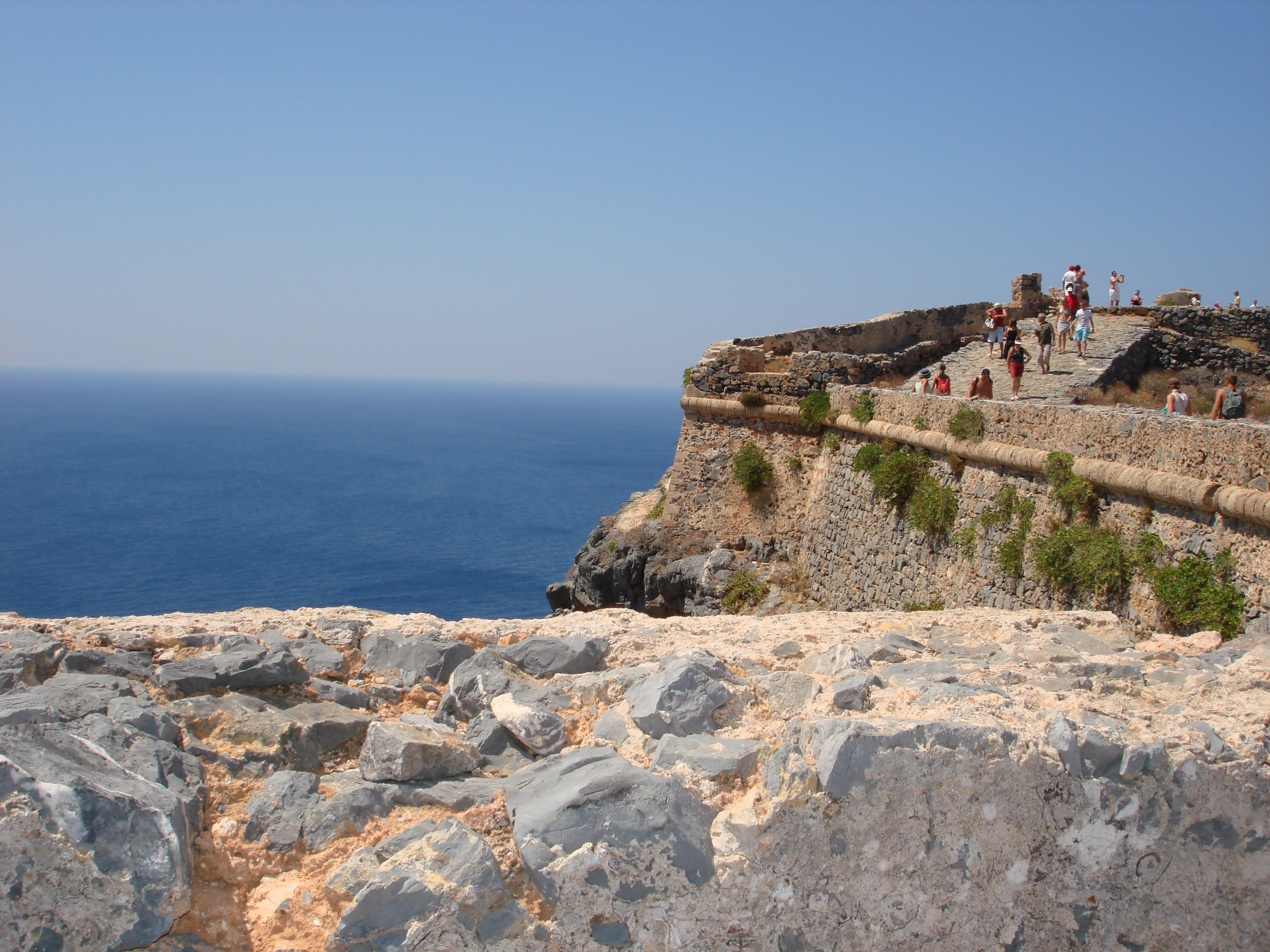
The walls of the fort at Imeri Gramvousa

The fort at Imeri Gramvousa was built between 1579 and 1584 during the Venetian rule over Crete to defend the island from the Ottoman Turks. The fort remained in Venetian hands throughout the prolonged Cretan War, and in the treaty of 16 September 1669, which surrendered Crete to the Ottomans, Gramvousa, along with the fortresses of Souda and Spinalonga, was retained by Venice. These three forts defended Venetian trade routes and were also strategic bases in the event of a new Ottoman–Venetian war for Crete.

In 1691, during the Morean War (another Ottoman–Venetian war), the venal Venetian commander betrayed Gramvousa to the Ottomans. He lived the rest of his life in Constantinople and was well known by the nickname "Captain Grambousas". Not long after the start of Turkish rule, Cretan insurgents used to gather at the three coastal forts which included Gramvousa.

== Greek War of Independence ==
With the outbreak of the Greek War of Independence, the fort fell to the insurgents' hands. In 1823, Emmanouil Tombazis, the Greek provisional government's commissioner for Crete, failed to strengthen the defences at Gramvousa when he had the opportunity, soon after his arrival on the island.

Towards the summer of 1825, a body of three to four hundred Cretans, who had fought with other Greeks in the Peloponnese, journeyed to Crete. On 9 August 1825, led by Dimitrios Kallergis and Emmanouil Antoniadis, this group of Cretans, disguised as Turks, captured the fort at Gramvousa, which became their base. These and subsequent actions revitalized the Cretan insurgency, ushering the so-called "Gramvousa period".

Although the Ottomans did not manage to retake the fort, they were successful in blocking the spread of the insurgency to the islands' western provinces. The insurgents were besieged in Gramvousa for more than two years and they had to resort to piracy to survive. Gramvousa became a hive of piratical activity that greatly affected Turkish-Egyptian and European shipping in the region. During that period the population of Gramvousa became organised and they built a school and a church. The church was called Panagia i Kleftrina and was dedicated to the wives of the klephts, namely the pirates.

In 1828, the new governor of Greece, Ioannis Kapodistrias, sent Alexander Mavrocordatos with British and French ships to Crete to deal with the pirates. This expedition resulted in the destruction of all pirate ships at Gramvousa and the fort came under British control. On 5 January 1828, on Kapodistrias' orders Hatzimichalis Dalianis landed at Gramvousa with 700 men. On 31 January, HMS Cambrian wrecked off the coast of Gramvousa, after colliding with another Royal Navy ship.

During the Cretan revolt of 1878, only the forts at Gramvousa, Ierapetra, Spinalonga, Heraklion, Rethymnon, Izzeddin, Hania, and Kissamos could not be captured by the insurgents because they did not have the necessary artillery.

== Balos Lagoon ==
There is a lagoon, named the Balos lagoon, between the island and the coast of Crete. There is an islet which forms part of a cape, through the lagoon, called Cape Tigani (which means "frying pan" in Greek). North of Balos, at the Korykon cape, are the ruins of the small ancient Roman city of Agnion, with a temple to the god Apollo.

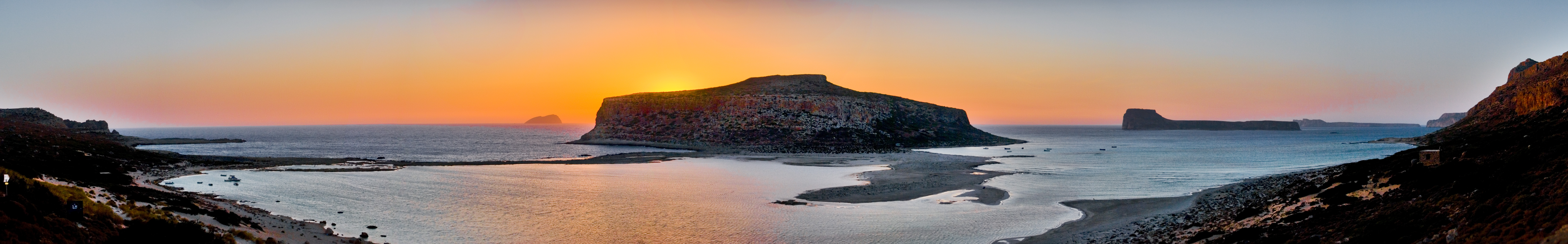
Sunset at the Balos Lagoon with Cape Tigani in the center, Pondikonisi in the background to the left, the island of Imeri Gramvousa in the background to the right, and further back to the right is the island of Agria Gramvousa (panoramic photograph taken from the island of Crete).

== Gallery ==
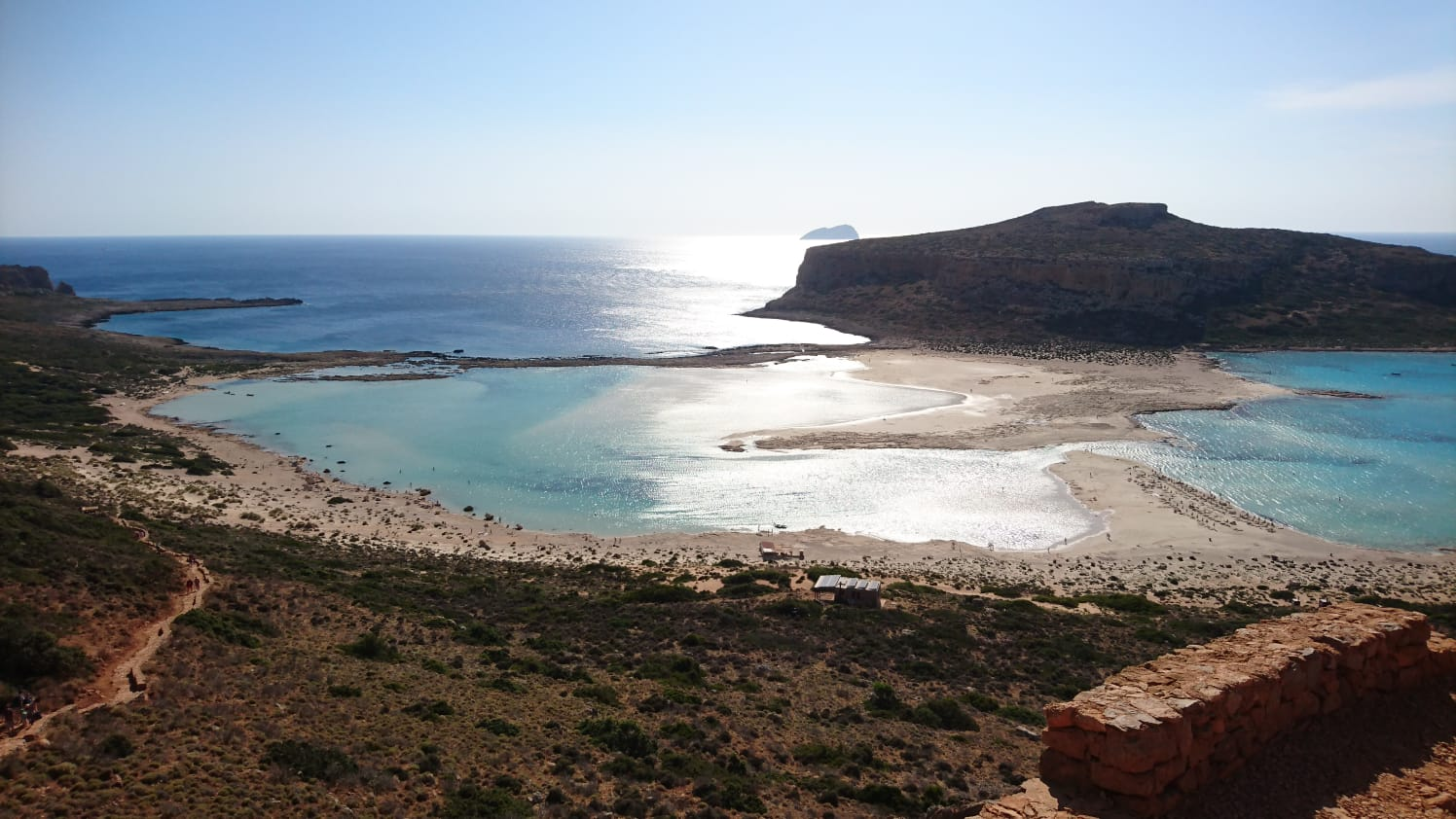
Balos Lagoon with Cape Tigani to the right

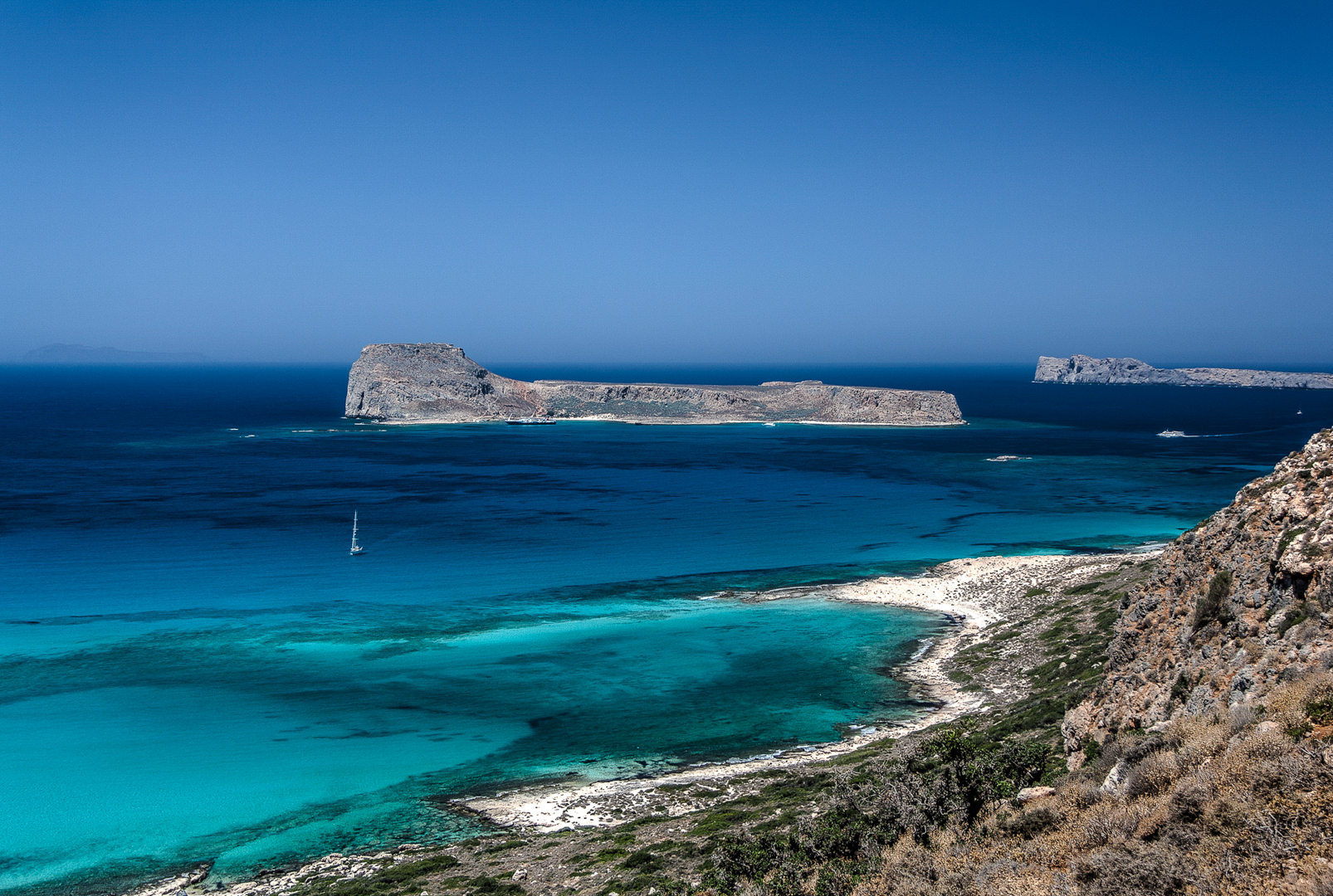
Imeri and Agria Gramvousa

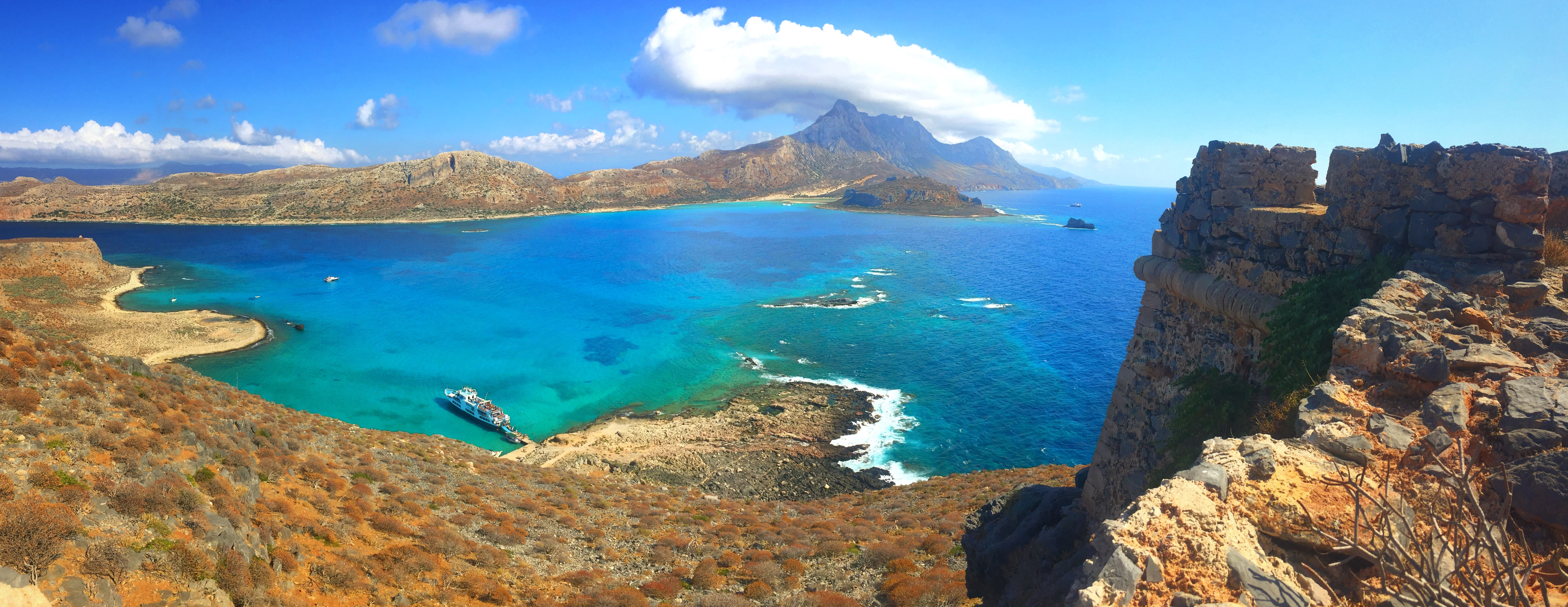
View of Balos Lagoon from the Gramvousa Fort

== See also ==
- List of islands of Greece

== Sources ==
- Maltezou, Chrysa A. (1988). "Η Κρήτη κατα τη Βενετοκρατία ("Crete under Venetian rule")". In Panagiotakis, Nikolaos M. (ed.). Crete, History and Civilization (in Greek). Vol. II. Vikelea Library, Association of Regional Associations of Regional Municipalities. pp. 105–162.
- Detorakis, Theocharis (1988). "Η Τουρκοκρατία στην Κρήτη ("Turkish rule in Crete")". In Panagiotakis, Nikolaos M. (ed.). Crete, History and Civilization (in Greek). Vol. II. Vikelea Library, Association of Regional Associations of Regional Municipalities. pp. 333–436.
- Severin, Tim (1987), The Ulysses Voyage: Sea Search for the Odyssey
