= Palaiosouda =

Greek islet in the Souda Bay

Native name: Παλαιόσουδα
- View from the north

- Location within Greece

Geography
- Coordinates: 35.499°N 24.179°E
- Archipelago: Cretan Islands

Administration
- Greece
- Region: Crete
- Regional unit: Chania

Demographics
- Population: 0

Palaiosouda (Greek: Παλαιόσουδα, "old Souda"), also known as Marati (Greek: Μαράθι), is an islet located south of the town of Marati, close to Souda Bay in Crete. The islet is a popular diving location.

== See also ==
- List of islands of Greece
