= Souda Bay War Cemetery =

CWGC cemetery in Crete

Suda Bay War Cemetery
- Commonwealth War Graves Commission
- Used for those deceased
- Location: 35°30′00″N 24°03′40″E; Chania Municipality, Greece
- Total burials: 1,564

The Souda Bay War Cemetery is a military cemetery administered by the Commonwealth War Graves Commission at Souda Bay, Crete, Greece. It contains 19 burials from World War I and 731 World War II burials where the body was identified along with another 776 burials of bodies which are unable to be identified (Battle of Crete). It was designed by architect Louis de Soissons.

== Notable Graves ==
Among those buried there are:

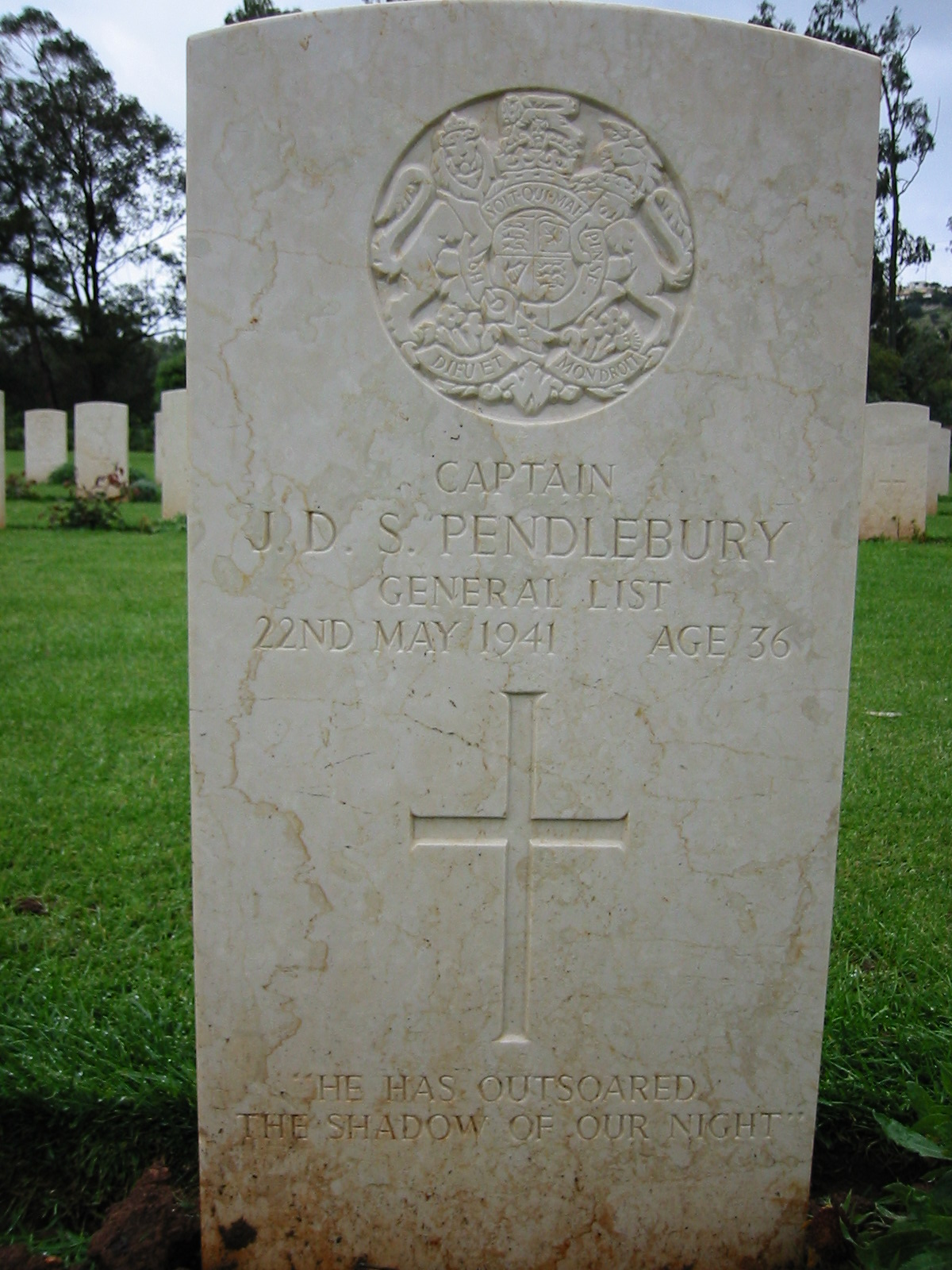
Grave of Pendlebury in Suda Bay War Cemetery

On 21 May 1941, when German troops took over Heraklion, Pendlebury slipped away with his Cretan friends heading for Krousonas, the village of Kapetanios Satanas, which was some 15 kilometres (9.3 mi) to the southwest. They had the intention of launching a counterattack, but on the way there Pendlebury left the vehicle to open fire on some German troops, who fired back. Some Stukas came over and Pendlebury was wounded in the chest. Aristea Drossoulakis took him into her nearby cottage and he was laid on a bed. The cottage was overrun and a German doctor treated him chivalrously, dressing his wounds; he was later given an injection.

Staff Sergeant Dudley Perkins 1915 – 25 February 1944), also known as Kiwi Perkins, was a New Zealand soldier who fought in Greece during World War II and participated in the Cretan resistance.
