= Izzeddin Fortress =

Ottoman fortress in Souda Bay, Crete

Coordinates: 35.469379°N 24.149735°E

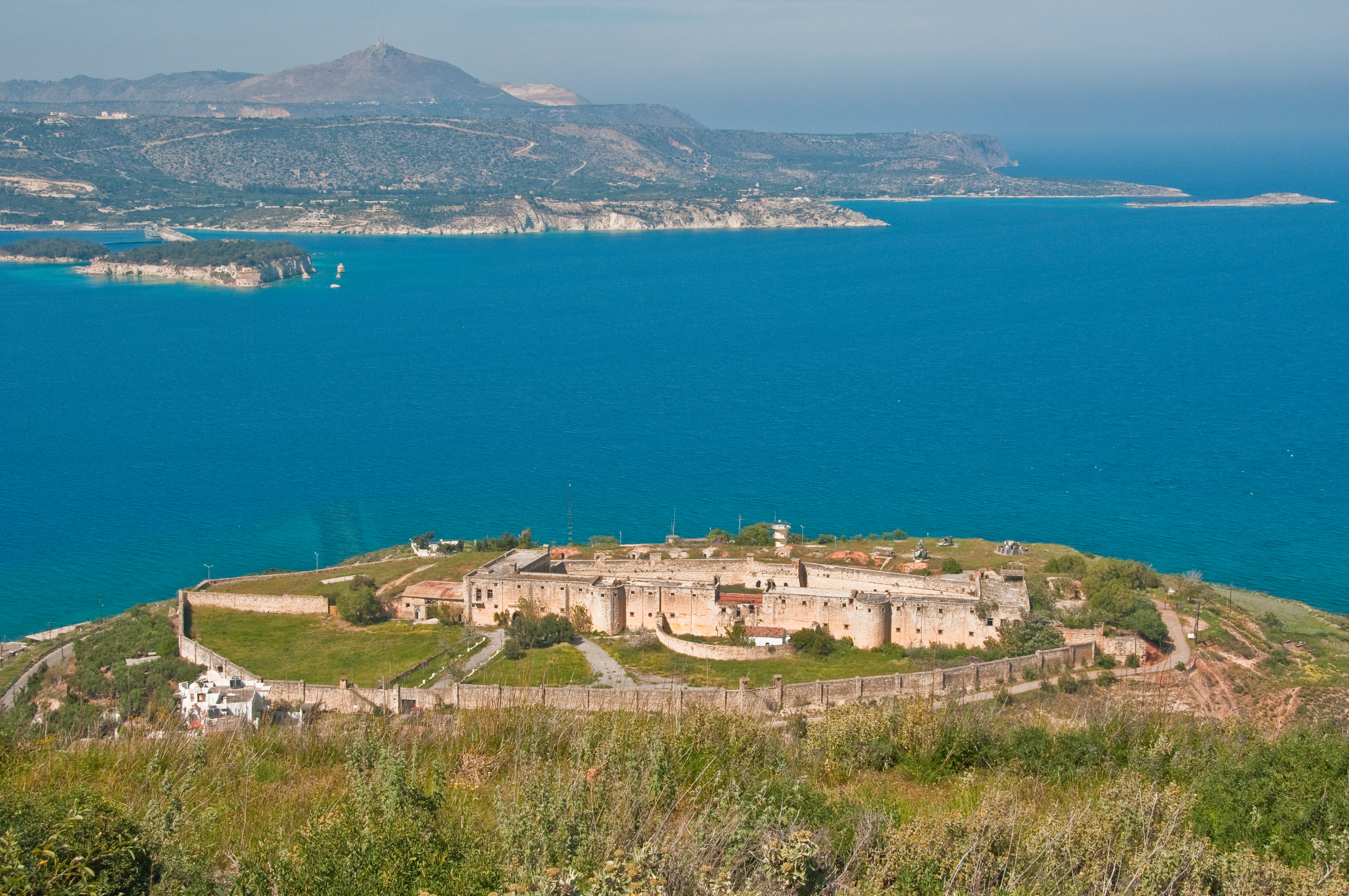
Photo of the fortress with the Souda Bay in the background

The Izzeddin Fortress (Greek: Φρούριο Ιτζεδδίν; Izzeddin means "Glory of the Faith") is an Ottoman fortress in Souda Bay, Crete, near the village of Kalami, best known for its role as a prison for political prisoners in 20th-century Greece.

The fortress was completed in 1875 by the Ottoman government, where it served as a prison and defensive outpost during successive Greek revolts in Crete. Once Crete passed under Greek rule, it was used to imprison political prisoners, including Eleftherios Venizelos in 1903, the deposed dictator Theodoros Pangalos in 1926–28, and many Greek communists after the Idionymon of 1929 that criminalized the Communist Party of Greece. Prisoners in the fortress organized themselves into a collective group known as the "Political Prisoners' Coexistence Group" (OSPK); they advocated for reforms like better medical treatment and abolition of harsh punishments, and smuggled books and newspapers into the prison.

Izzeddin Fortress stopped operation as a prison in 1971, and became a protected landmark in 1986.
