= Corycus (Crete) =

Corycus or Korykos (Ancient Greek: Κώρυκος) was a town in the northwestern part of ancient Crete on the peninsula of the same name mentioned by Ptolemy. There is a passage in which Juvenal mentions a Corycian vessel which evidently belonged to this Cretan town. When the Florentine traveller Cristoforo Buondelmonti visited Crete in 1415, he found remains existing.
