= Gramvousa Peninsula =

Peninsula in Crete

Coordinates: 35°34′15″N 23°35′37″E

Gramvousa Peninsula (Greek: Χερσόνησος Γραμβούσας, romanized: Chersonesos Gramvousas) is a peninsula at the northwestern end of the island of Crete, Greece. Anciently, it was known as Corycus or Korykos (Ancient Greek: Κώρυκος), or as Cimarus or Kimaros (Κίμαρος); although the latter is ascribed to the cape at the northern extremity of the peninsula (Cape Vouxa). Strabo states that Corycus was the point whence the distances to the several ports of Peloponnesus were measured. According to Pliny, the islands which lie off this promontory were called Corycae (modern Gramvousa), and that part of the mass of rock which forms this point went by the name of Mount Corycus. Ptolemy mentions a city also called Corycus, and there is a passage in which Juvenal mentions a Corycian vessel which evidently belonged to this Cretan town. When the Florentine traveller Cristoforo Buondelmonti visited the island in 1415, he found remains existing.
