= Corycus (Pamphylia) =

Greek town in ancient Pamphylia, near Attaleia

Corycus (Ancient Greek: Κώρυκος, romanized: Korykos) was a Greek town in ancient Pamphylia, near Attaleia. Strabo mention that Attalus II Philadelphus, who had also founded the city of Attaleia, sent a colony to Corycus and surrounded it with a greater circuit-wall.

The location of the town has not been determined with certainty.
