= NATO Missile Firing Installation =

Missile firing range in Greece

- Souda Bay, Crete, Greece; Near Chania
- NAMFI emblem

Site information
- Type: missile firing range
- Owner: Hellenic Army
- Operator: Greece, Germany, the Netherlands, United States
- Website: http://www.namfi.gr

Location
- Coordinates: 35°34′22″N 24°10′25″E

Site history
- Built: 1967

The NATO Missile Firing Installation or NAMFI (Greek: Πεδίο Βολής Κρήτης, "Crete Firing Range") is an extensive missile firing range located at Souda Bay on the island of Crete, Greece.

== History ==
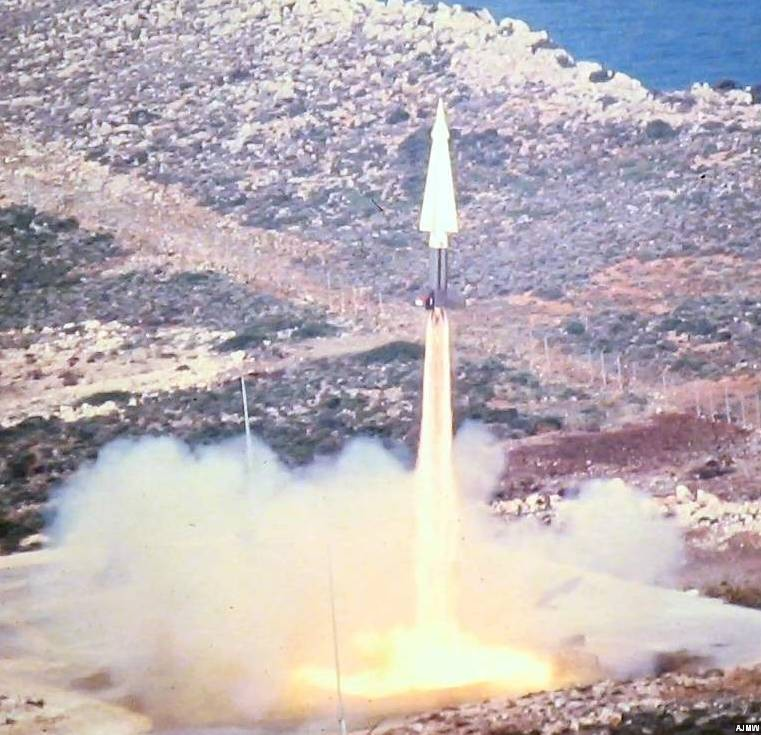
MIM-14 Nike Hercules rocket fired at NAMFI

NAMFI was established in 1967 as a NATO training facility for Air Defence Systems and it takes advantage of clear atmospheric conditions throughout the year. Currently NAMFI is regularly used by the armed forces of Greece, Germany, the Netherlands, and the United States. In the past it was also used by Belgium, Denmark and Norway.

== Activities ==
Today the firing range is used mostly for MIM-104 Patriot and MIM-23 Hawk launches, although a wide range of surface to air and air to surface missiles are fired occasionally. As the trajectories of the missiles cross busy air and sea areas, an Air and Sea surveillance radar system is used to resolve possible conflicts.
