= Corycus (Lycia) =

Corycus (Ancient Greek: Κώρυκος, romanized: Korykos) was a Greek port city in ancient Lycia. The location of the city has not been determined with certainty. The Barrington Atlas of the Greek and Roman World places the city at 36°26′10.1″N 30°28′42.8″E. This is a short distance north of the modern town Çıralı in the Kumluca district of Antalya Province, Turkey.

The city is mentioned by the Stadiasmus Patarensis and the Stadiasmus Maris Magni. Mustafa Adak has argued that the name of Corycus was eventually changed to Olympos, after the original city of Olympus had been destroyed by the Roman Republic. According to him Olympus was initially founded on Mount Olympus, which he identifies as Musa Dağı instead of Tahtalı Dağı. After the destruction the population would have moved to Corycus. The name change might have happened when Hadrian visited the city in 131 AD.

== Sources ==
- Adak, Mustafa (2004). "Lokalisierung von Olympos und Korykos in Ostlykien". Gephyra (in German). Vol. 1, no. 1. Archived from the original on 2016-03-04.
