= Leucae (Laconia) =

Coordinates: 36°49′37″N 22°52′30″E

Leucae or Leukai (Ancient Greek: Λεῦκαι) was a town of ancient Laconia situated at the northern extremity of the plain Leuce which extended inland between Acriae and Asopus on the eastern side of the Laconian Gulf.

Its site is located near the modern Molaoi.
