= Souda Bay =

Bay of Crete, Greece

Coordinates: 35°29′0″N 24°08′17″E

Interactive map of Souda Bay.

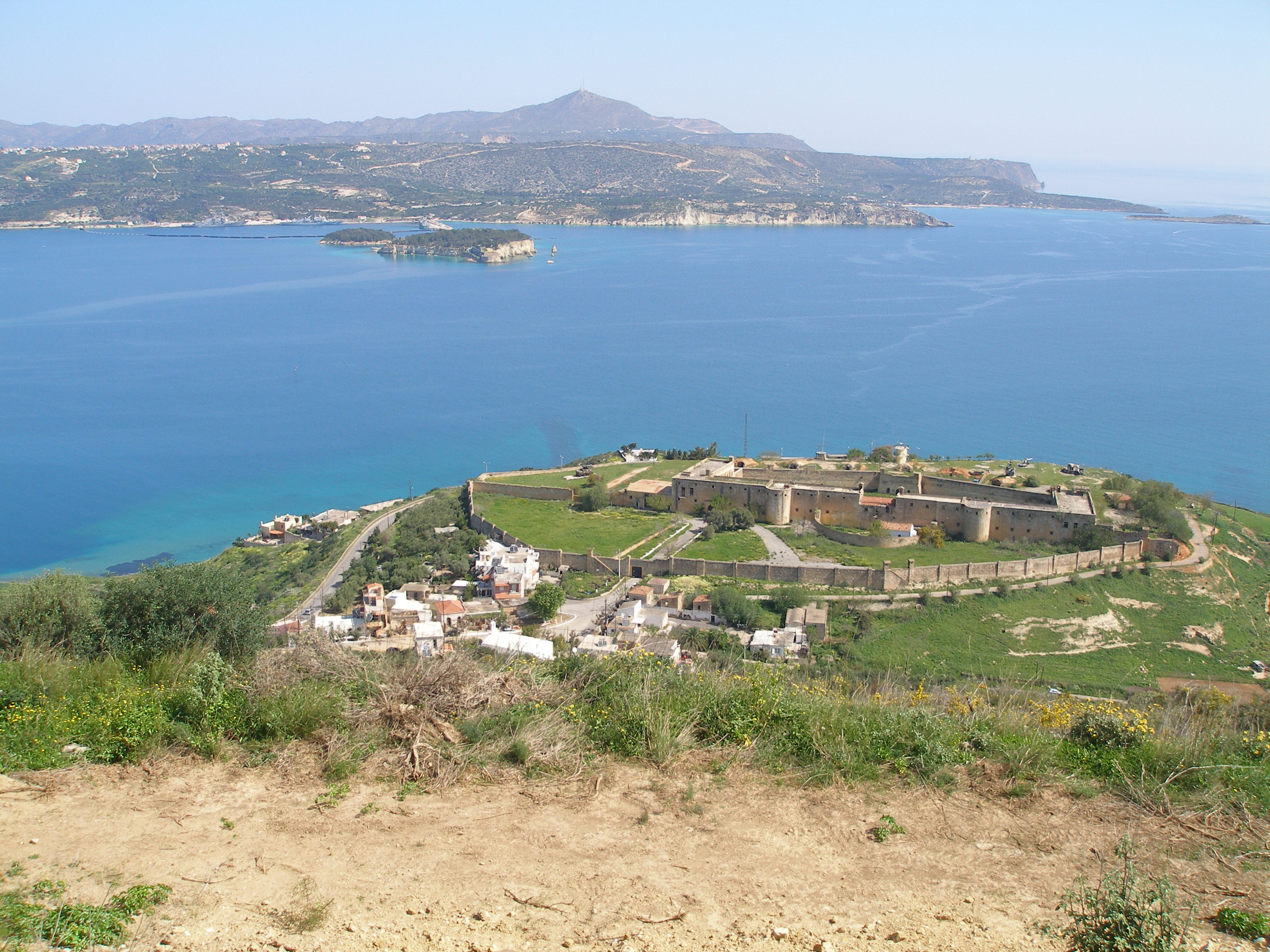
Souda Bay inlet, with the Izzeddin Fortress in the foreground

Souda Bay (Greek: Κόλπος Σούδας) is a bay and natural harbour near the town of Souda on the northwest coast of the Greek island of Crete. The bay is about 15 km long and only two to four km wide, and a deep natural harbour. It is formed between the Akrotiri peninsula and Cape Drapano, and runs west to east. The bay is overlooked on both sides by hills, with a relatively low and narrow isthmus in the west near Chania.

Near the mouth of Souda bay, between the Akrotiri and the town of Kalives, there is a group of small islands with Venetian fortifications. The largest island is Souda Island, giving its name to the bay.

Souda Bay is now a popular tourist destination although there are no formal public beaches designed in the area, due to the presence of the Crete Naval Base, a major naval installation of the Hellenic Navy and NATO in the eastern Mediterranean. Villages such as Megala Chorafia and Kalives afford fine views of the bay, and house-building, particularly for foreigners and tourist companies, is spreading along the bay.

== History ==
=== Ancient and Medieval ===
There have been port facilities on the bay since ancient times, previously serving the city of Aptera. Aptera was founded in the 7th century BC and was an important city during the ancient and early Byzantine periods. It was destroyed by the Saracens in the 820s AD. The nearest large ancient city was Kydonia, which flourished in the Minoan era on Crete; moreover, during a portion of the first millennium BC Kydonia held influence over Aptera.

=== Venetian rule ===
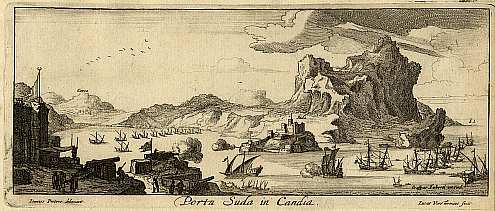
View of Souda bay by Jan Peeters, 1690

The Venetians occupied the area in 1207. In 1571 an Ottoman military force landed at Souda and caused major destruction in the Chania area. The Venetians fortified Souda Island between 1570 and 1573, in order to protect the area from Ottoman raiders and pirates. However, Souda Bay remained a pirate infested area during the 15th, 16th and 17th centuries. The Venetians managed to hold on to the strategic islands within Souda Bay until 1715, over thirty years after the fall of Crete to the Ottomans.

=== Ottoman rule ===
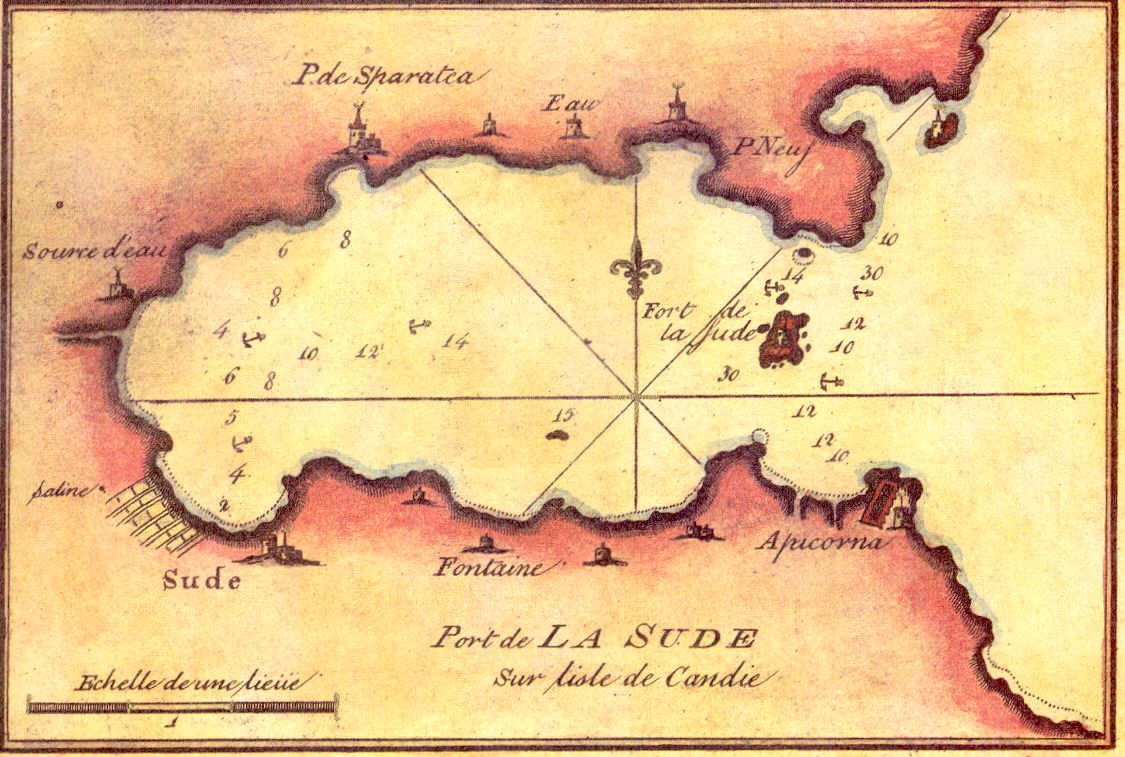
French nautical chart of Souda Bay in the 18th century.

In 1822 an Egyptian army of approximately 10,000 under Hassan Pasha landed at Souda to defeat the Cretan Revolution of 1821.

After the Cretan Revolution of 1866–69, the Ottomans built fortresses at Aptera (Aptera Fortress) and Kalami (Izzeddin Fortress), barracks, a military hospital and a naval base. They also built the town of Souda at the head of the bay, as the new port of the nearby city of Chania. The fortress at Kalami is still in use as prisons. The naval base was officially inaugurated in 1872, in the presence of Sultan Abdul Aziz.

=== Cretan State (1898–1913) ===
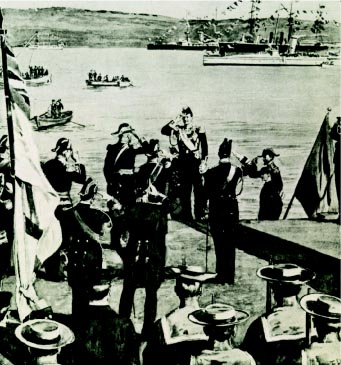
The arrival of the first High Commissioner in 1898

Illustration of units of the International Squadron arriving at Suda Bay, on 21 December 1898. The French protected cruiser Bugeaud, carrying the High Commissioner, leads the column. She is followed (right to left) by the Russian Gerzog Edinburgski, the British battleship HMS Revenge, and the Francesco Morosini.

In the period of the semi-independent Cretan State the area attracted international interest, as it offered port facilities to foreign naval vessels enforcing the Cretan autonomy. The first High Commissioner, Prince George of Greece, disembarked at Souda Bay on December 9, 1898. The church of Saint Nicholas was built during this period.

=== Union with Greece to World War II (1913–1940) ===
In 1913, events marking the union of Crete with Greece took place on Souda Island. On February 1 the metallic Ottoman flag, the last symbol of Ottoman rule, was removed and replaced by the Greek flag on May 1. Also the ruined chapel was rebuilt and dedicated to Saint George.

In 1916 the British liner SS Minnewaska, requisitioned by the British Army as a troops carrier, struck a mine and was beached at Souda Bay.

After 1923 the area was used as a Hellenic Army base, housing the artillery units of 5th Infantry Division.

=== 1940–1945 ===
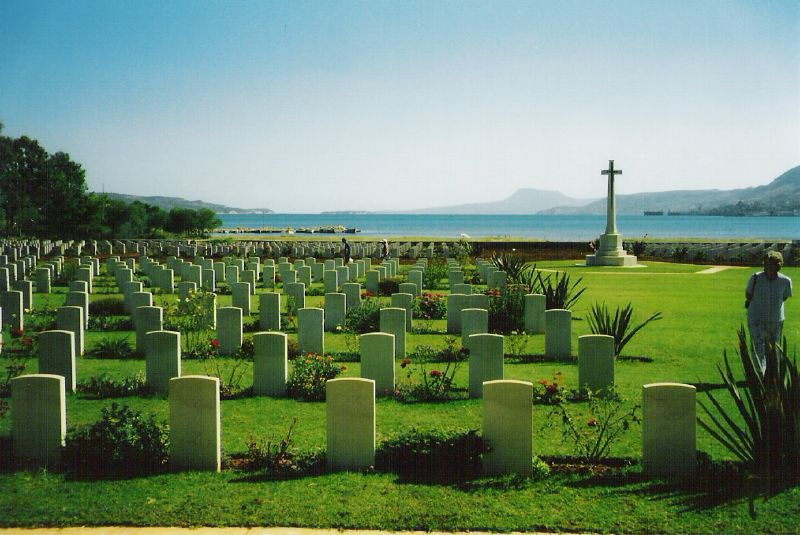
The Souda Bay Allied War Cemetery

During World War II British and Commonwealth troops withdrew from mainland Greece in April 1941 and 25,000 men, mainly from New Zealand and Australia, disembarked at Souda Bay.

In May 1941, during the German attack named "Operation Merkur", Allied troops retreated from the Souda area to Sfakia in the south of the island. The Germans occupied the area until 1945. The Souda Bay Allied War Cemetery, the principal Allied war cemetery of the island, designed by architect Louis de Soissons, is located at Souda.

== Military installations ==
Souda Bay is the location of three major military installations: the Hellenic Navy's Crete Naval Station, which also houses the NATO Maritime Interidiction Operational Training Centre; the Hellenic Air Force's Souda Air Base on Akrotiri Peninsula, base of the 115th Combat Wing; and the NATO Missile Firing Installation.

== Philately and postal history ==
"Souda" stamp (1913)

During Turkish rule an Ottoman post office operated in Souda. Evidence (mailed covers) indicate that this post office was open throughout the 1890s. The Cretan State post office opened officially on 1 March 1912, although a postal agency operated there since 1908.

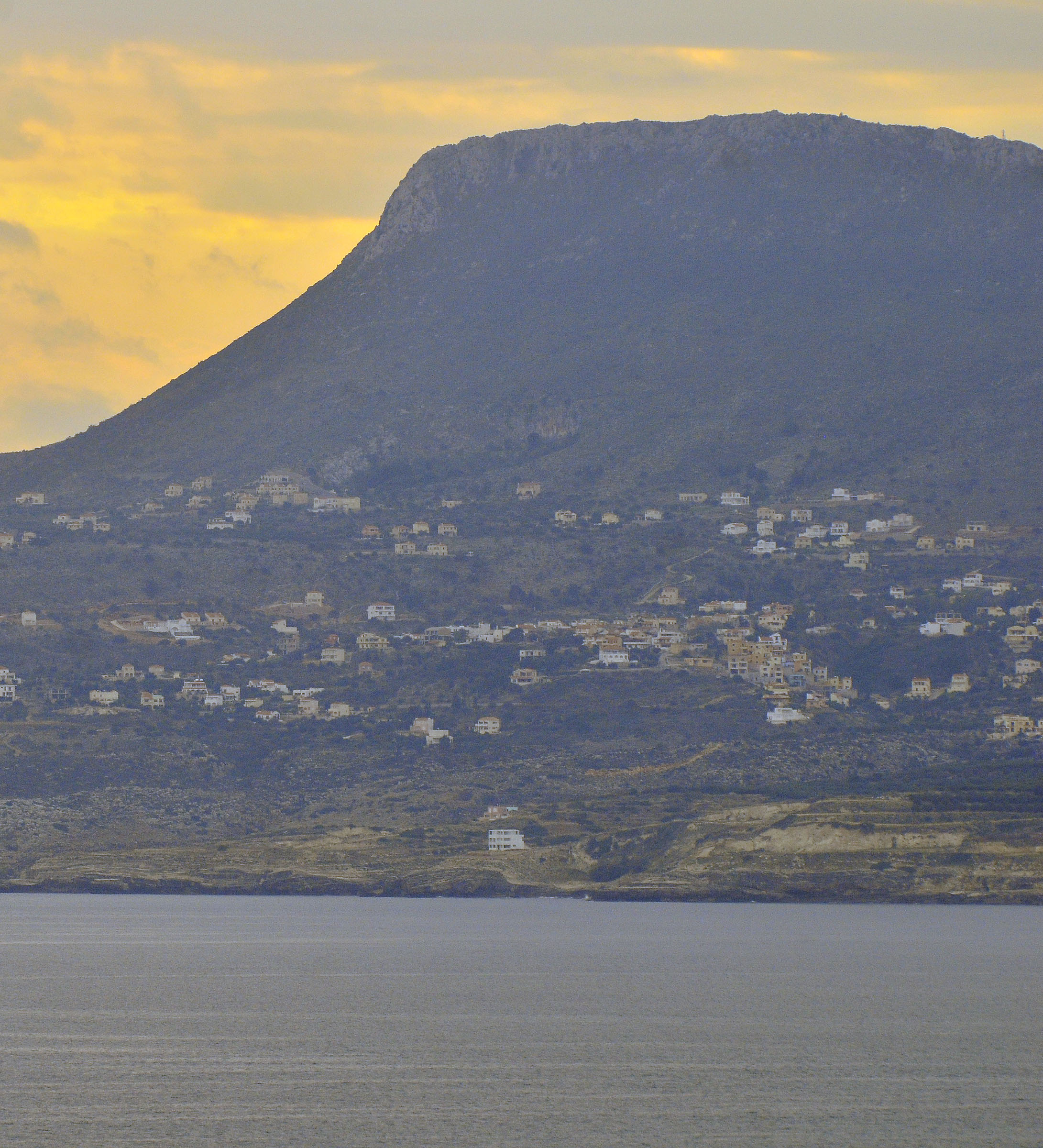
Souda Bay, Greece in November 2012

A special local stamp depicting Souda Island was issued on November 15, 1913, to commemorate the union with Greece and was sold only by Cretan post offices. This stamp, printed by Bradbury Wilkinson and Company in the United Kingdom, is commonly called the "Souda Issue".

== See also ==
- Aptera
- Battle of Crete
- Chania International Airport
