= Leon (Souda Bay) =

Island in Greece

Native name: Λέων
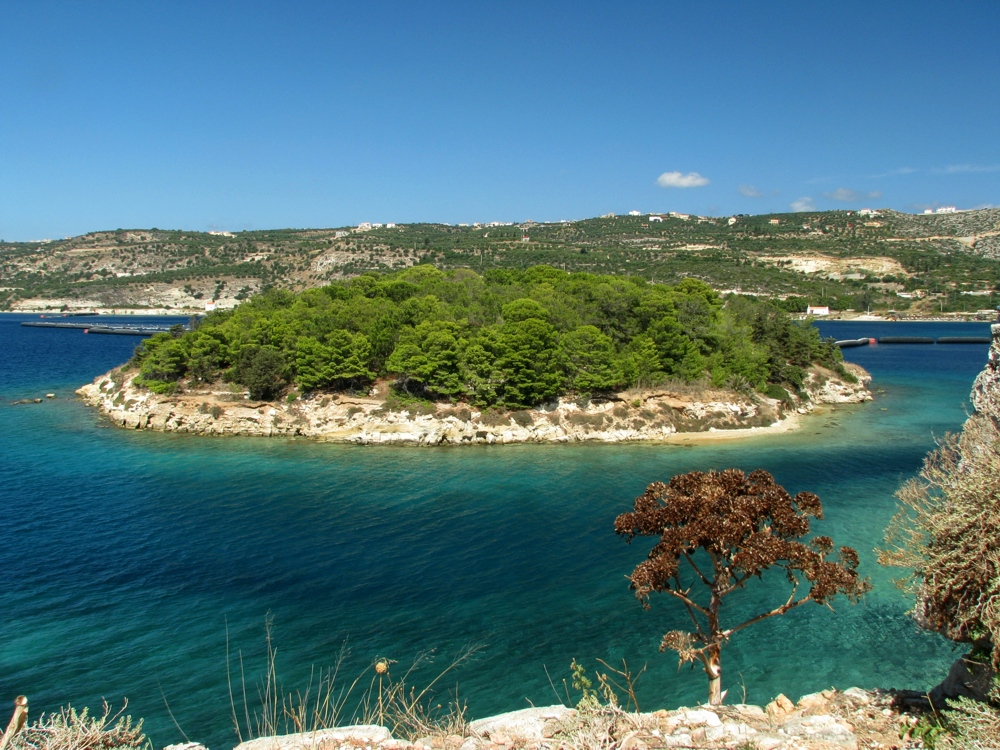
- The islet of Leon viewed from the fortifications on the islet of Souda within Souda bay

- Location within Greece

Geography
- Coordinates: 35.4908°N 24.1505°E
- Archipelago: Cretan Islands

Administration
- Greece
- Region: Crete
- Regional unit: Chania

Demographics
- Population: 0 (2001)

Leon (Greek: Λέων, "lion"), also known colloquially as Nisi ("the island") and during Venetian rule as Rabbit Island, is an islet in Souda Bay on the northwest coast of Crete.

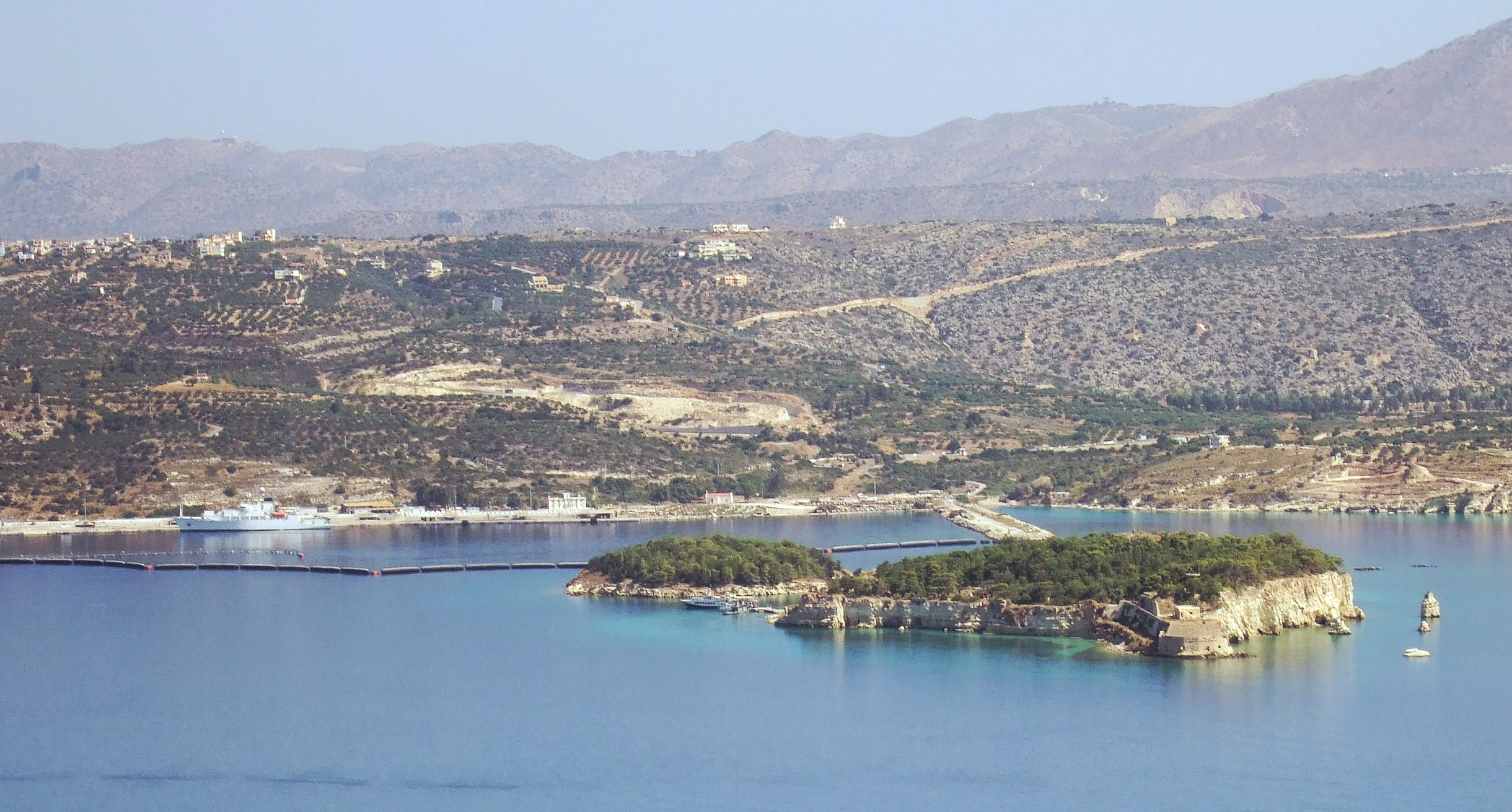
The islet of Leon, on the left, next to the larger islet of Souda, within Souda bay

On the southeast side of the islet, a small distance away, there is another larger islet called Souda. In ancient times these two islets were referred to as Leukai (Greek for "white ones") and pronounced "Lefkai". Their name came from the ancient Greek myth about a musical contest between the Sirens and the Muses. Out of their anguish from losing the competition, writes Stephanus of Byzantium, the Muses plucked their rivals' feathers from their wings; the Sirens turned white and fell into the sea at Aptera ("featherless") where they formed the islands in the bay that were called Lefkai.

== See also ==
- List of islands of Greece
