= Souda (island) =

Island in Greece

Native name: Σούδα
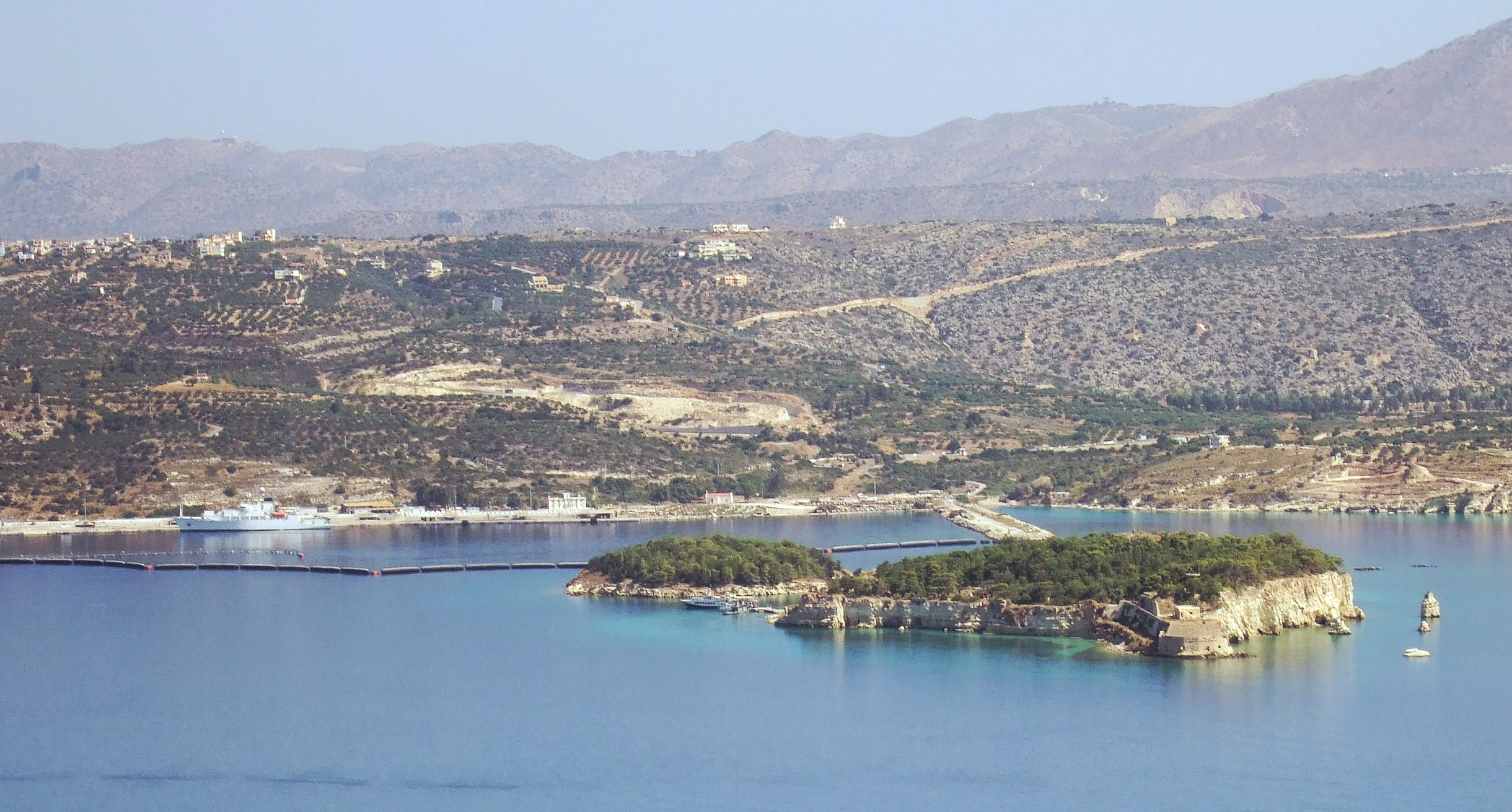
- The islet of Souda, to the right of a smaller islet called Leon, in Souda bay.

- Location within Greece

Geography
- Coordinates: 35.489°N 24.152°E
- Archipelago: Cretan Islands

Administration
- Greece
- Region: Crete
- Regional unit: Chania

Demographics
- Population: 0 (2001)

Souda (Greek: Σούδα) is an islet in Souda Bay on the northwest coast of Crete. In ancient times this islet was one of two islets that were referred to as Leukai (Λευκαί). The second islet is known today as Leon.

== History ==
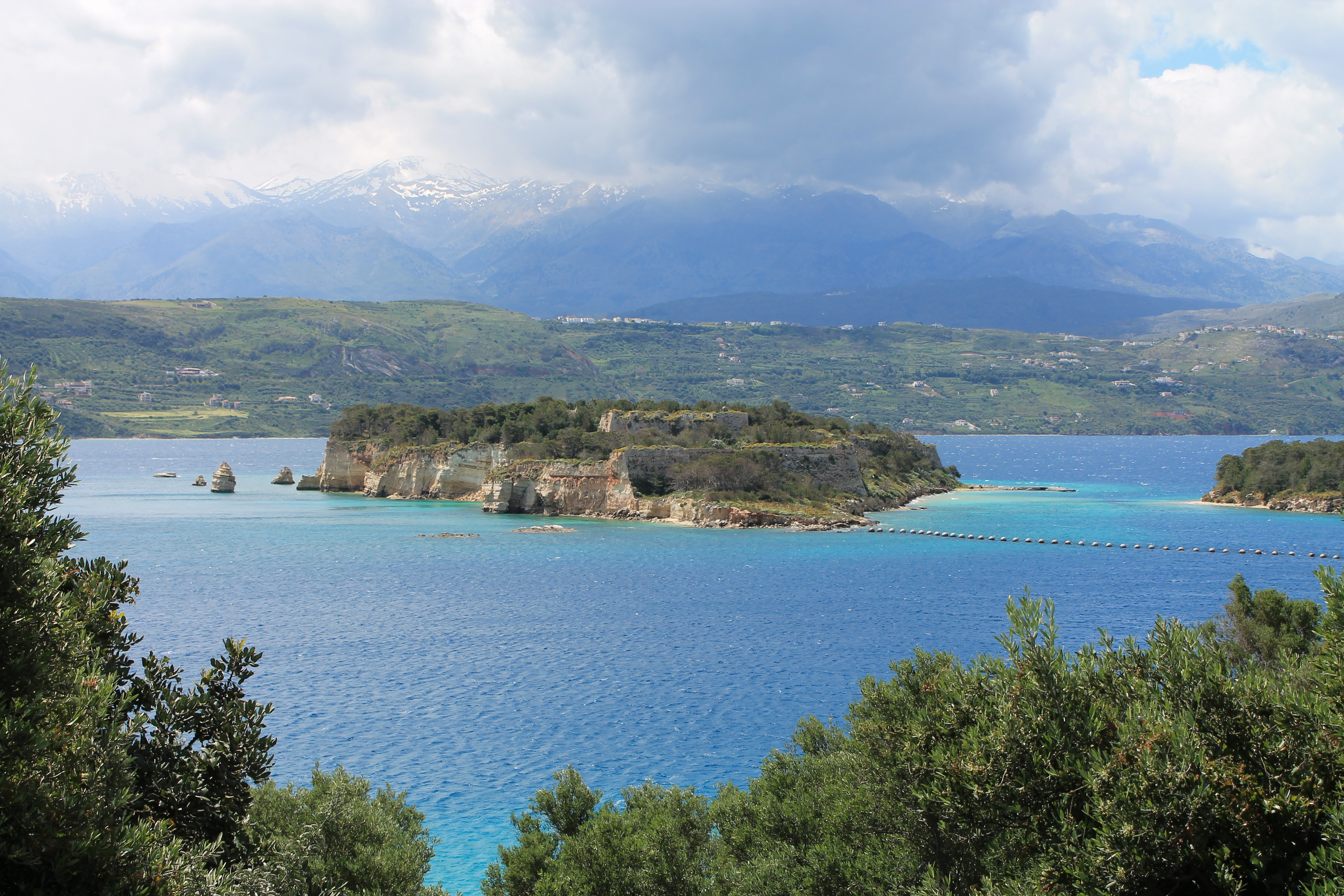
View of Souda.

The island was fortified by the Venetians due to its strategic location, controlling the entrance to the anchorage of Souda Bay (which is still an important Greek and NATO naval base). Although the rest of Crete fell to Ottoman control in the Cretan War (1645–1669), the fortress of Souda (along with the island fortresses of Gramvousa and Spinalonga) remained in Venetian hands until 1715, when they too fell to the Ottomans. During this time, the island served as a refuge for Cretan insurgents.

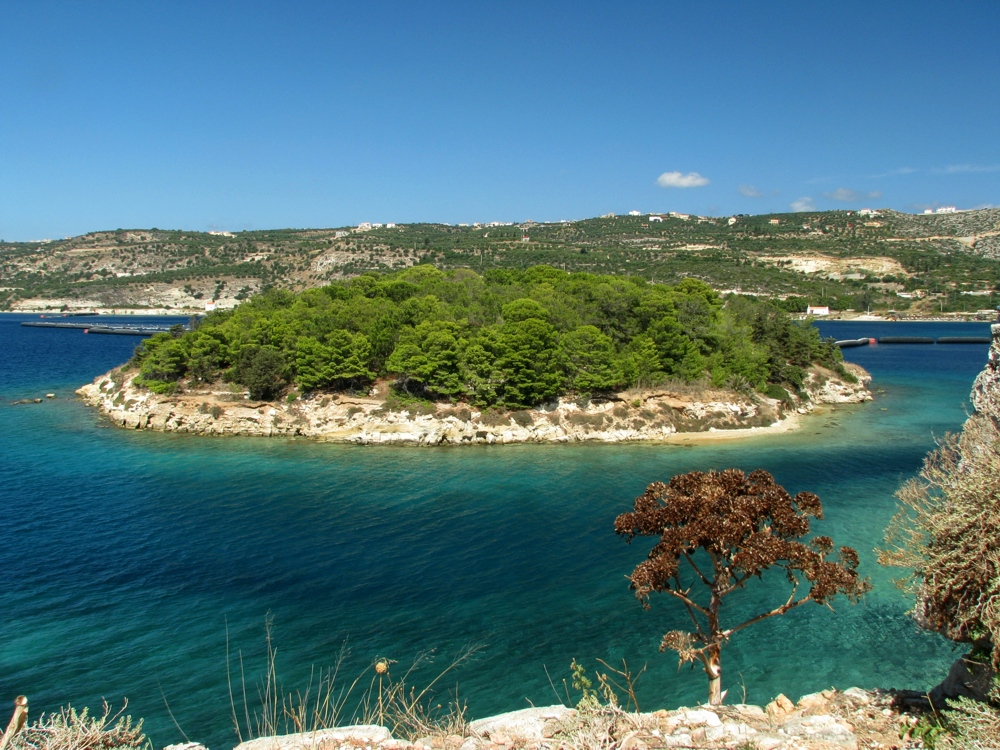
View of the islet called Leon from the Venetian fortifications on the islet of Souda.

== Mythology ==
On the northwest side of the islet, a small distance away, there is another island which is almost round in shape, which used to be referred to on medieval Venetian maps as Rabbit Island (known as Nisi and Leon today). In ancient times these two islets were referred to as Leukai (Greek for "white ones"). Their name came from the ancient Greek myth about a musical contest between the Sirens and the Muses. Out of their anguish from losing the competition, writes Stephanus of Byzantium, the Sirens lost their wings and, having turned white, threw themselves into the sea at Aptera ("wingless") where they formed the islands in the bay that were called Lefkai.

== See also ==
- List of islands of Greece
