= British School at Athens =

Archaeological research center in Greece

British School at Athens Greek: Βρετανική Σχολή Αθηνών
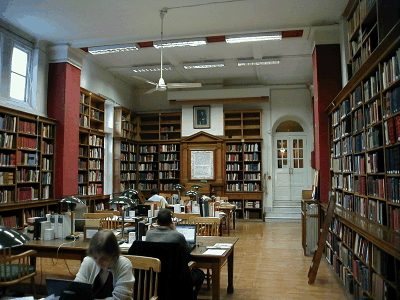
- The library of the BSA (2002)
- Founders: The Prince of Wales, later Edward VII, called the foundation meeting in 1883 (143 years ago)
- Established: 1886 (140 years ago), the year the completed building was opened for business, and the tenancy of the first director began
- Mission: "to promote the study of Greece in all its aspects."
- Focus: "to provide facilities for those engaged in research into anthropology, archaeology, archaeometry, architecture, art, environment, geography, history, language, literature, religion and topography pertaining to Greek lands in all periods including modern times."
- Chair: Roderick Beaton
- Director: Rebecca Sweetman
- Endowment: £2,242,453 in mid-2018
- Subsidiaries: Fitch Research Laboratory; Knossos Research Center; Library
- Owner: "The British School at Athens ... is a registered charity (no. 208673) in English law, and is governed by trust deed."
- Address: 52 Souedias Street; Athens, 10676 +30 211 1022 801
- Location: Athens, Greece
- Coordinates: 37°58′44″N 23°44′51″E
- Interactive map of British School at Athens; Greek: Βρετανική Σχολή Αθηνών
- Website: www.bsa.ac.uk

The British School at Athens (BSA; Greek: Βρετανική Σχολή Αθηνών) is an institute for advanced research, one of the eight British International Research Institutes supported by the British Academy, that promotes the study of Greece in all its aspects.

Under English law it is a registered educational charity, which translates to a non-profit organisation in American and Greek law. It also is one of the nineteen Foreign Archaeological Institutes defined by Hellenic Law No. 3028/2002, "On the Protection of Antiquities and Cultural Heritage in General" passed by the Greek Parliament in 2003. Under that law, the nineteen accredited foreign institutes may perform systematic excavation in Greece with the permission of the government.

The school was founded in 1886 as the fourth such institution in Greece (the earlier being the French, German, and American). For most of its existence, it focused on supporting, directing and facilitating British-based research in classical studies and archaeology, but in recent years, it has broadened that focus to all areas of Greek studies. It has made notable contributions in the fields of epigraphy and the history of Modern Greece.

It is defined by Hellenic law to be a "foreign archaeological school" with a very specific meaning. In addition to being trusted with antiquities in Greece, it serves as an agent for the Hellenic utilisation of British resources in Greece. Only the BSA can assign projects to British institutions, and it may only do so with permission of the Minister of Culture.

The BSA's activities include a regular programme of lectures and seminars, a series of scholarships and bursaries, the publication of a research journal, reports, monographs and online works, Athens-based courses for undergraduates, postgraduates and teachers, as well as archaeological fieldwork. The directors, who have included many distinguished figures, have tended to be in Greece for only part of the year, keeping roles in the UK or elsewhere.

== Facilities ==
BSA facilities include one of the most important Classical and archaeological libraries in Greece (over 60,000 volumes), and the Fitch laboratory, the oldest archaeometric laboratory in Greece. The BSA also operates a branch at Knossos in Crete, including one of the island's main archaeological libraries.

=== Fitch Laboratory ===
The Marc and Ismene Fitch Laboratory, Fitch Laboratory for short, is a scientific laboratory for conducting technical investigation of materials obtained from archaeology. It is located in a separate building on the grounds of the premises at 52 Souedias Street, Athens. Having begun in 1974 in a storage facility, it was expanded into a two-story building in 1988. The laboratory is funded separately from the rest of the school. It has its own director, (since 2019) Evangelia Kiriatzi, its own research scientists, teaches its own courses, offers its own grants, and issues its own publications. It is, however, governed by the main school's Committee for Archaeology.

Fitch Laboratory was founded during a period of growing interest in establishing the provenience of pottery discovered during excavation. The method of archaeology established a sequence of layers at a site, which gave relative dates to the objects found in them; however, the method had limitations. Suppose that pottery in one region was similar to pottery at another, how was this similarity to be interpreted? Did invaders carry the pottery from one site to another? Were the similar pots trade exports? Did the pottery of one region serve as a model for the manufacture of pottery in another?

Answers to these questions were provided by the judgements of the lead excavators, but with no method of establishing provenience, these judgements were often highly controversial. For example, there are striking similarities between some Minoan and some Mycenaean pottery. Arthur Evans, Duncan Mackenzie and their supporters were proposing that Mycenaean pottery was a type of Minoan pottery. To the contrary, Carl Blegen and his supporters were affirming a mainland Greek origin for and importation to Crete of Mycenaean pottery. Given some of this pottery at a site, which was it, Minoan or Mycenaean, and how could one establish which?

By the 1960s, archaeologists were turning to the chemical and physical sciences for answers. The science of geology provided them with petrology, the study of the rock composition of the clay from which the pots were made. Microscopic examination of a thin section of pot material reveals the minerals present in the grains of clay. The mineral composition of pots is then compared to the mineral composition of the rock from which various known clay beds had come. If there were any mineralic distinctions between Mycenaean and Minoan pottery, petrology would discover them.

By that time also, new methods of chemical analysis of inorganic material were available, which are generally classified as "activation analysis." The general method exploits two natural phenomena: the tendency to form stable atoms with a given energy structure (number and configuration of electrons and neutrons, etc.), and the action of an atom to transduce radiational energy falling on it. The input energy "activates" or superenergizes the atom in some way, creating an unstable configuration, which then decays, releasing the extra energy in radiation of wavelengths characteristic of the atom. A device to read the wavelengths and radiational intensities at those wavelengths then identifies the element and concentration present.

Of the three general types of activation, the mass spectrometer bombards the sample with a stream of electrons, or electrical current, until it reaches temperatures high enough to dissociate the atoms into a plasma, or cloud of superenergized ions, in which the electrons have acquired the energy to expand into unstable orbits. As the electrons fall back they lose energy as visible light. Diffraction of the light produces a spectrum that can be read electronically or captured on film. The bands of light identify the elements. Specrometers are used less frequently in archaeology as they destroy the sample; in fact, Law 3028 forbids destructive tests of artifacts.

In a second type, neutron activation analysis (NAA), a stream of neutrons generated in a particle accelerator is directed onto the sample, forcing some of its atoms to acquire additional neutrons, generating unstable isotopes, which decay immediately, releasing gamma radiation. As in electron bombardment, the radiation emitted is of wavelengths characteristic of the element. The gamma photons are diffracted for a spectrum read-out; in addition, the half-life of the decaying isotope can be calculated, which also is characteristic and serves as an identifier. This is a popular method in ceramic elemental analysis because it is non-destructive of the sample. As it requires larger facilities, such as a particle accelerator, not present at most laboratories, the samples must be sent out.

The third method, X-ray fluorescence. a type of fluorescence, analyzes the elemental composition of solids without dissociating the atoms from the solid state. It is generally employed on the solids of art and archaeology, such as ceramics, metallic objects, paintings, and so on. In this type the sample is bombarded with x-rays or gamma rays. The electrons are energized in place without breaking up the solid matrix. Moving from the inner orbits to the outer, they fall back to the inner, giving up the induced energy as x-rays of wavelengths characteristic of the element. These are diffracted and read.

In 1960, Sinclair Hood, the school's director, in the process of attempting to determine whether some pottery was Minoan or Mycenaean, contacted the new laboratory for archaeology and the history of art at the University of Oxford, which was already using activation analysis. The director and assistant director of the laboratory considered the question so important that they flew immediately to Greece to obtain permission from the government to acquire and experiment on samples from twenty Theban pots. The pots were analyzed, but the analysis produced no definitive answers. Oxford and the British School continued to work together analyzing pots until in the late 1960s M.J. Aitken of the Oxford laboratory proposed that the British School initiate its own laboratory. The proposal was kept secret until the British School could obtain permission from the Hellenic Ministry of Culture with the assistance of Spyridon Marinatos, Inspector-General of the Archaeological Service. Permission obtained, the managing committee of the British School openly sought funding from the British Academy. They agreed to underwrite expenses once it was established and equipped . The Oxford laboratory offered to provide initial equipment and training. There remained a gap in the funding required to start the laboratory. The Fitches, who had helped build the stratigraphic museum at Knossos, stepped forward. The laboratory became operational in 1974.

Since 1974, the laboratory has been continually in use either for educational purposes or for conducting research. There has been no lack of funding from many private sources. The laboratory specializes in petrology and analysis of inorganic materials, especially ceramics, by x-ray fluorescence. For the petrology, it has two research polarising microscopes supported by a digital photography system. The analysis is performed by a Wavelength Dispersive X-ray Fluorescence (WD-XRF) unit, which diffracts the sample-emitted x-rays into a spectrum of different wavelengths. The laboratory's course on ceramic petrology is standard. All samples are archived on the second floor. The archive contains about 3000 rock samples from various geological formations covering a range of clay beds, and 10,000 archaeological samples. The laboratory also collects animal bones and seeds for reference. Recognizing that research can best be performed by a pool of facilities at different laboratories, the Fitch Laboratory is part of a formal network of laboratories.

== Archaeological fieldwork ==
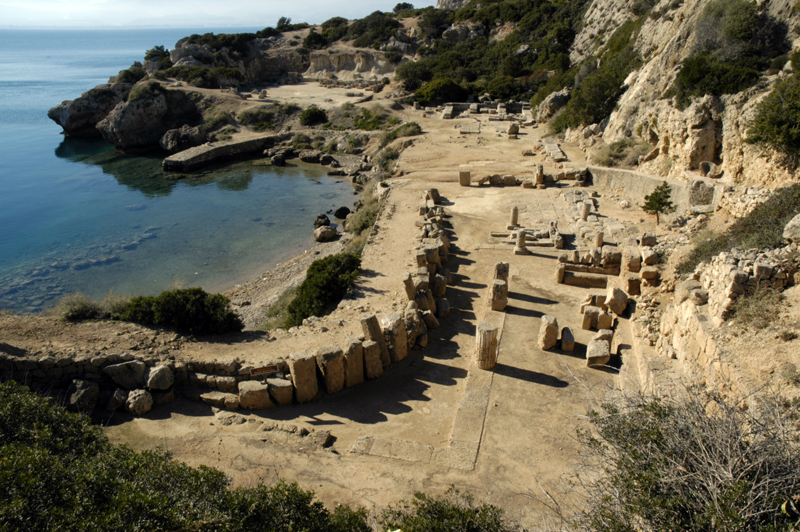
The Heraion of Perachora, excavated by the British School at Athens during the 1930s

During its long history, the BSA has been involved in a multitude of archaeological projects, including surveys in Laconia, Boeotia, Methana (Argolid), and in the islands of Ithaca (Ionian islands), Kea, Melos, Kythera (Cyclades), Chios (North Aegean) and Crete (Ayiopharango Survey, Ayios Vasilios Survey, Knossos Survey, Praisos Survey) and excavations at Nea Nikomedeia, Sitagroi, Servia and Assiros (Greek Macedonia), Lefkandi (Euboia), Emborio and Kato Phana (Chios), Perachora (Corinthia), Mycenae (Argolid), Sparta (Laconia), Phylakopi (Melos), Keros (Cyclades), as well as in Crete at Knossos, Karphi, Praisos, Debla, Trapeza Cave, Atsipades Korakias, Psychro, Myrtos, Petsofas and Palaikastro.

== Women in the BSA ==
Eugénie Sellers Strong was the first woman student to be admitted to the BSA in 1890, four years after its foundation.

Agnes Conway was admitted to the British School at Athens under director Alan Wace for the 1913–1914 session, along with her friend Evelyn Radford with whom she had attended Newnham College, Cambridge. The trip they took to the Balkans during the session was published in 1917 as A Ride Through the Balkans: On Classic Ground with a Camera. Agnes Conway married architect-archaeologist George Horsfield in 1932.

There have been three female directors of the BSA out of 24 in total. Rebecca Sweetman assumed the position in September 2022.

== Directors of the BSA ==
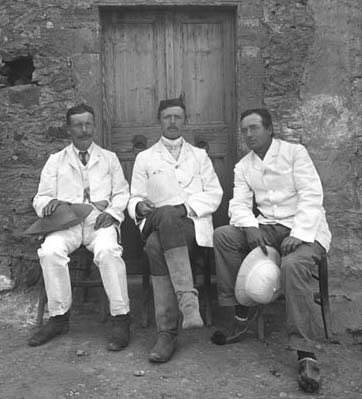
Robert Carr Bosanquet (centre), Richard MacGillivray Dawkins (left) and Charles Trick Currelly (right) at Roussolakkos, 1903–1905

- 1886 F. C. Penrose
- 1887 E. A. Gardner
- 1895 Cecil Harcourt Smith
- 1897 D. G. Hogarth
- 1900 R. C. Bosanquet
- 1906 R. M. Dawkins
- 1913 A. J. B. Wace
- 1923 A. M. Woodward
- 1929 H. G. G. Payne†
- 1936 Alan Blakeway†
- 1936 Gerard Mackworth Young
- 1946 John Manuel Cook
- 1954 Martin Sinclair F. Hood
- 1962 A. H. S. Megaw
- 1967 P. M. Fraser
- 1971 H. W. Catling
- 1989 E. B. French
- 1994 Martin Price†
- 1995 R. A. Tomlinson
- 1996 D. J. Blackman
- 2002 A. J. M. Whitley
- 2007 C. A. Morgan
- 2015 John Bennet
- 2022 Rebecca Sweetman

† Died in office

== See also ==
- Council for British Research in the Levant
- British Institute at Ankara
- British Institute for Libyan and Northern African Studies
- British Institute for the Study of Iraq
- British Institute of Eastern Africa
- British Institute of Persian Studies
- British School at Rome
- List of Foreign Archaeological Institutes in Greece
