= Armenoi (archaeological site) =

Archaeological site on Crete

- 35°19′05.05″N 24°27′48.65″E
- Type: Minoan cemetery
- Cultures: Minoan
- Location: Rethymno, Crete, Greece

Site notes
- Excavation dates: 1969–present
- Archaeologists: Yiannis Tzedakis
- Public access: Yes

Armenoi is the archaeological site of an ancient Minoan cemetery on the north coast of Crete, roughly 8 kilometres (5 miles) south of the modern town of Rethymnon and close to the Minoan peak sanctuary at Vrysinas. It dates primarily to the Late Minoan II/IIIA/B period (c. 1470–1200 BC) though a single tholos-type grave dates back to the Late Minoan IB period (c. 1625–1470 BC). Found in a tomb, a single stirrup jar with the Linear B inscription "wi-na-jo" suggests there was some Mycenae contact in the later period of occupation.

== Archaeology ==
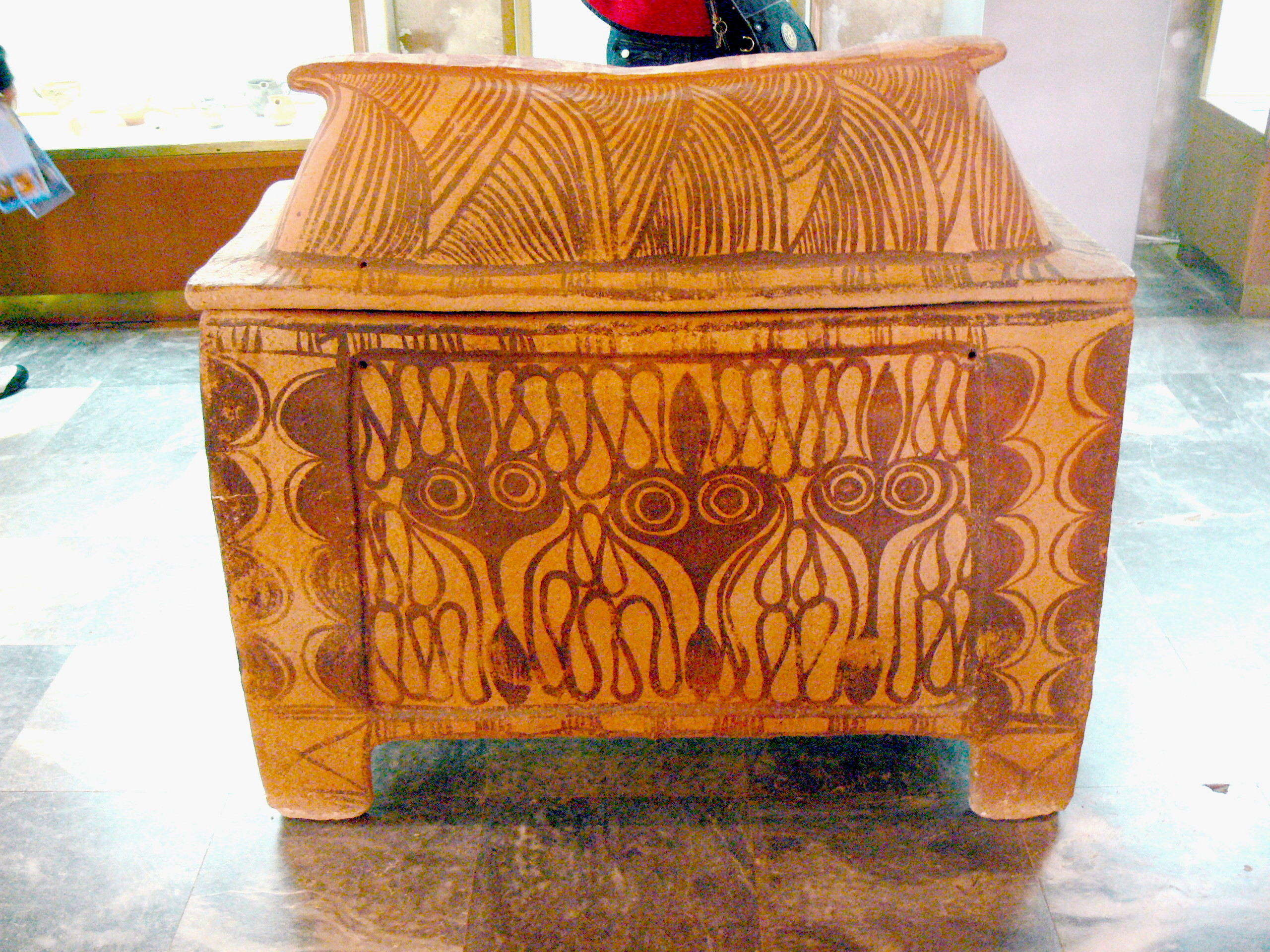
Larnax from the site, Archaeological Museum of Chania

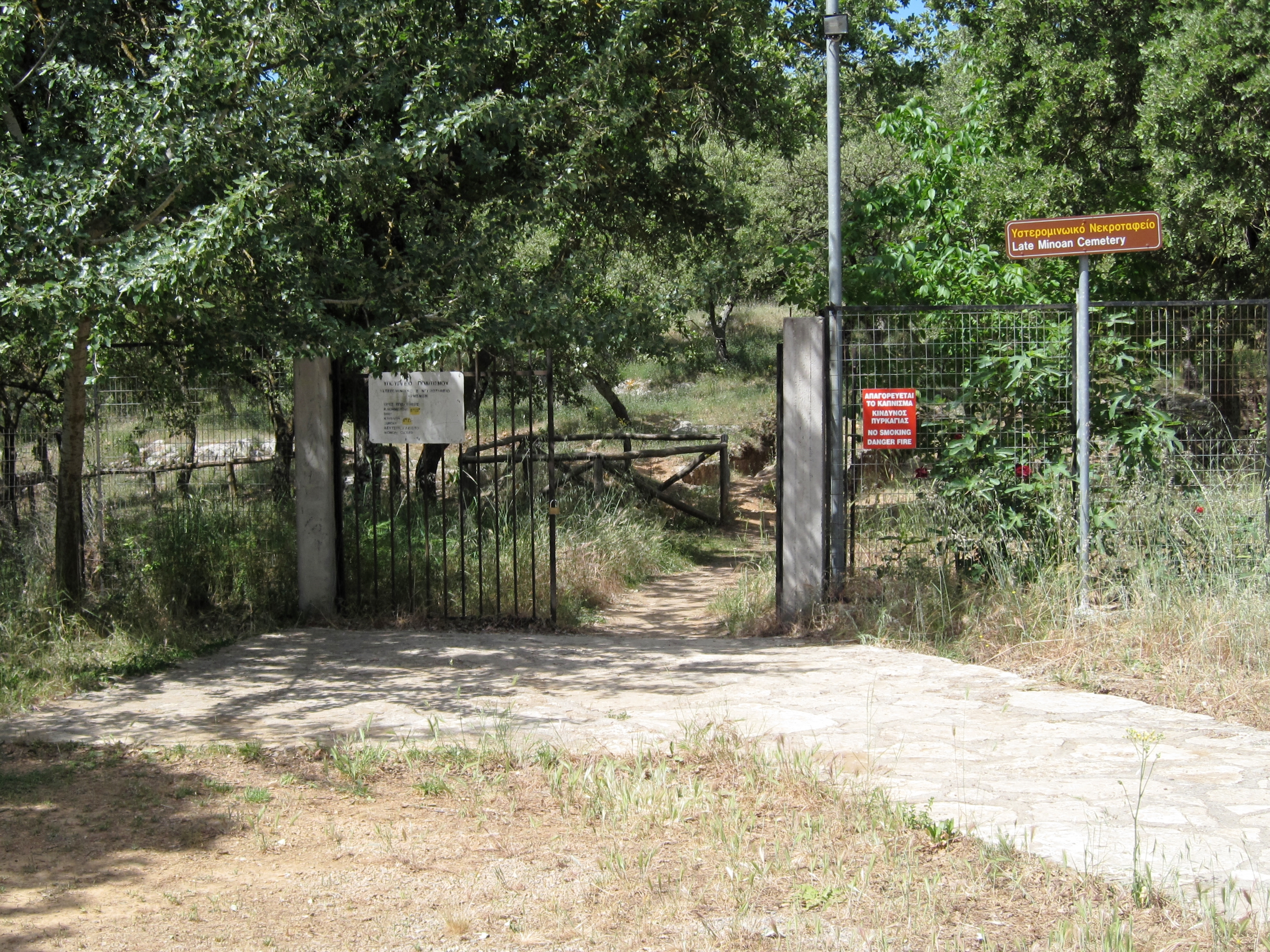
The entrance to the site

The site covers an area of about 35 acres. It is considered the most intact Minoan cemetery excavated. Only four of the tombs had been looted at the end of the Minoan period. Minor damage occurred during construction of a fortification by the German Army in WWII and by badgers using some of the tombs as dens. Armeni has been under excavation since 1969 by Dr. Yiannis Tzedakis; 232 chamber tombs and one tholos tomb have been found. All chamber tombs date to the Late Minoan II/III period and the tholos tomb to the Late Minoan IB period.

=== Tombs ===
The cemetery was planned, with paths and leveled areas. The tombs fall into three zones: A, B, and C. There are a few unfinished tombs where the ground proved too hard, which allows insight into the construction process. One tomb, the oldest, is of tholos construction with corbelled stones while the rest are chamber tombs, each consisting of a dromos (entrance way) which was dug first, and a chamber. The dromos had either steps or a ramp and was typically between 1.5 meters and 2.5 meters in width and between 3.5 meters and 7 meters in length (one example is 16 meters long). The tombs appear to have been used as a family burial site with new remains added over time (17 skeletons were found in one tomb). Chamber tombs were oriented to the east with dromos angle ranging from 52.5 degrees to 133 degrees, toward the Minoan peak sanctuary at Vrysinas. Some of the tombs contain "benches, pillars, conches, or crypts, which sometimes contained votives or traces of bones, in the floor or the walls of the dromo". Some of the tombs had larnakes (small clay coffins) usually containing a single skeleton. A few of the larnakes have polychrome painting, one showing a hunting scene with four dogs, two stags, and an agrimi (Cretan wild goat) and others with animals (octopus, deer and birds), geometric designs, or symbols (such as Horns of Consecration).

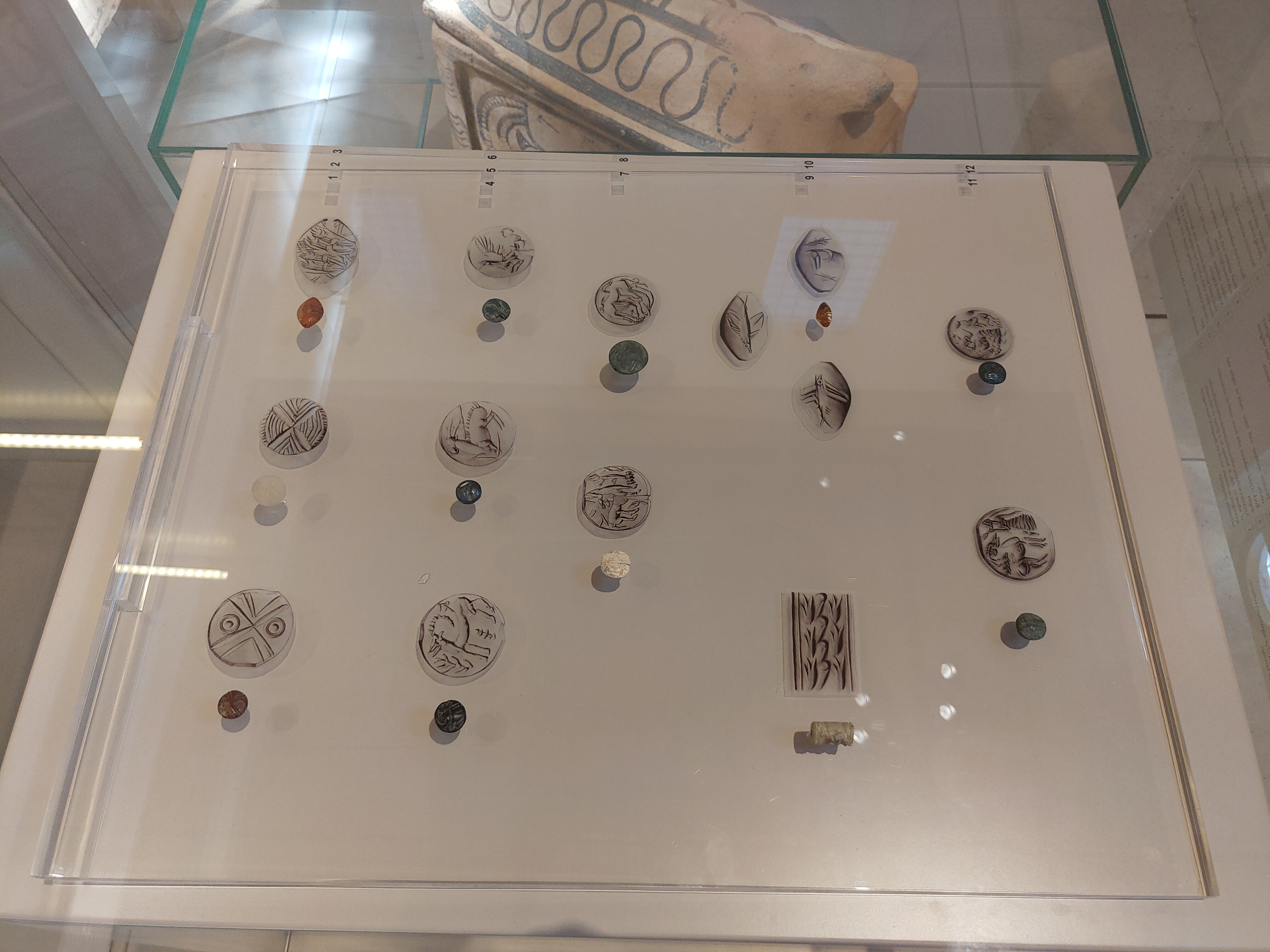
Late Minoan sealstones from Armenoi cemetery (in Rethymno Museum)

Large amounts of pottery were found in the tombs, primarily jugs, pyxides, kraters, alabastra, amphorae, stamnoi, stirrup jars, and incense burners. The Minoan chronology is based on pottery so tombs could be closely dated. Kylixes and cups were found to contain the residue of "greek grog", an alcoholic beverage made from grains, honey, herbs, fruits, and occasionally even grape wine leading to suggestions they were used as part of funerary ritual. Other tomb finds included a boar's tusk helmet, spindle whorls, beads, clay idols, bone pins, and an ivory comb thought to have been an import from Egypt or Syria. A number of bronze grave goods were recovered including rings, daggers, spearheads, swords, tools, and vases. A few gold beads and silver rings were also found.

A number of soft stone lentoid Minoan seal-stones, of a style usually called Cretan Popular Group, were found at the site as well as a boar's tusk helmet. A few cylinder seals were also found. Other seals were made using rock crystal, serpentine, sardium, faience, or glass paste. A single stirrup jar, found in a tomb, with the Linear B inscription "wi-na-jo" suggests there was some Mycenae contact in the later period of occupation. The same inscription was found on a stirrup jar excavated at Dendra. The same scribe wrote on a stirrup jar found at Knossos. A stone amulet was found in a tholos grave from the Linear Minoan IB period inscribed with a combination of two Linear A ideograms.

=== Human remains ===
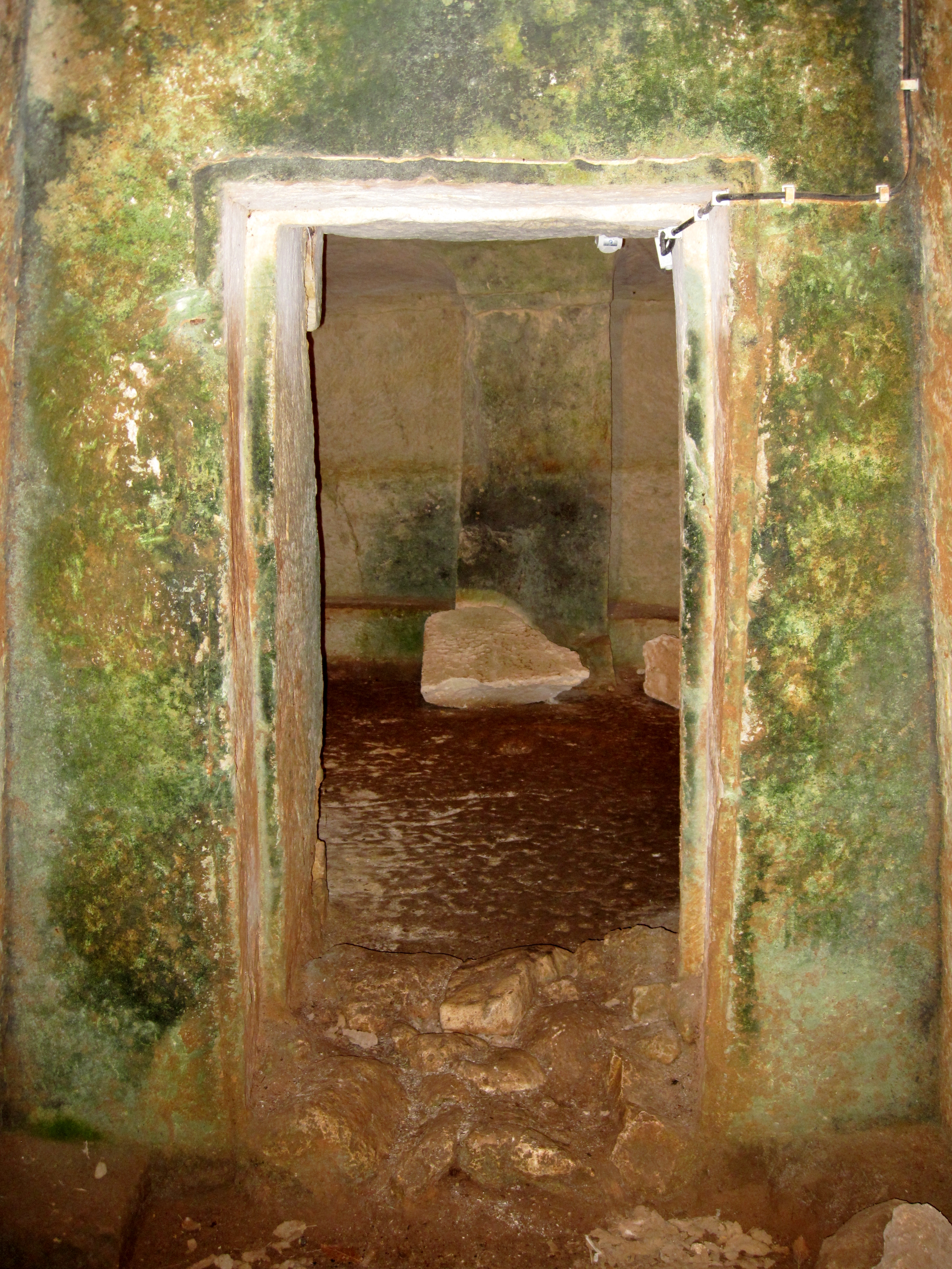
The largest tomb

Over 1000 individuals have been recovered from the tombs (200 articulated primary burials and 800 secondary co-mingled burials), with more males than females (143 males to 107 females). The average age at death is estimated to have been 30–35 years. An osteoarchaeological study of some of the remains found 250 adult and 106 child skeletons. Analysis of the isotope composition and genetics of some of the skeletons indicates that four of the buried did not come from the local area. DNA analysis of several samples (Tomb 230, tooth) found the mtDNA haplogroup of H59, which is common in the area. Based on the characteristic lesions on the vertebrae, 15 possible cases of TB and two possible cases of brucellosis were noted on the skeletons. Facial reconstructions were created for two individuals (Tomb 132).

"one individual seems to have met a very violent death. The deceased was about twenty-five years old, fairly tall and robust. On several parts of the body (arm, thigh and shins), there are some ten cut marks which must have been caused by blows from a sharp, heavy instrument: probably an axe. His right hand was completely severed at the middle of the forearm. It has been suggested that his premature and violent death was the result of a duel or murder, although execution or even torture cannot be excluded"

=== Town ===
Given the numerous tombs and wealth of grave goods, the necropolis appears to have served a large and prosperous nearby settlement. The excavators have proposed that this town was located at the modern village of Kastellos, where archaeological surveys and trial excavations have found evidence of LM III occupation.

== Tourism ==
The site is open to tourists, including entrance into several of the main rock-cut tombs. Automatic lighting has been installed. There is an entrance fee of €3. Artifacts from the site can be found at the Archaeological Museum of Chania and the Rethymno Museum.

== See also ==
- Minoan pottery
- Minoan art
- Minoan religion
- Minoan eruption
