= David Blackman =

British archaeologist

David John Blackman is a British archaeologist specialising in ancient maritime history. He was a founder of the Committee for Nautical Archaeology in 1964, and was its Chair from 1975 to 1976. He served as Director of the British School at Athens between 1996 and 2002. He is currently a Senior Research Fellow at the Centre for the Study of Ancient Documents, University of Oxford.

== Works ==
- Blackman, D. J., ed. (1973). Marine archaeology. Hamden, Connecticut: Archon Books. ISBN 9780208013453.
- Blackman, David; Rankov, Boris (2013). Shipsheds of the ancient Mediterranean. Cambridge: Cambridge University Press. ISBN 9781107001336.

Academic offices
Preceded by Richard Tomlinson	Director of the British School at Athens; 1996 to 2002	Succeeded by James Whitley
