= Skopia =

Skopia (Greek: Σκοπιά, "watch-place, lookout") may refer to several places in Greece:

- Skopia, Elassona, a village in Elassona
- Skopia, Evrytania, a village in Karpenisi
- Skopia, Farsala, a village and a community in Farsala
- Skopia, Florina, a village in Florina
- Skopia, Serres, a village in Nea Zichni
- Cape Skopia, a headland in Acarnania

== Other ==
- Skopia (Σκόπια) is also the Greek name for Skopje, and is often applied to the entire country of North Macedonia due to controversy (see Macedonia name dispute)

== See also ==
- Vigla (disambiguation)
