= Marett Lecture =

Annual lecture at the University of Oxford

The Robert Ranulph Marett Memorial Lectureship at Exeter College, Oxford is a memorial lecture established in memory of R. R. Marett, D.Litt., D.Sc., F.B.A., Rector of the College 1928-43, by subscribers to a Memorial Fund.

== List of Marett Lectures ==
Date	Lecturer	Title
17 May 1947	Dorothy Annie Elizabeth Garrod	Early man and the threshold of religion
5 June 1948	Herbert Jennings Rose	Mana in Greece and Rome
7 May 1949	Charlie Dunbar Broad	Egoism as a theory of human motives
3 June 1950	Edward Evan Evans-Pritchard	Social anthropology: Past and present
2 June 1951	(George) Gilbert Aimé Murray	Till Nous came and put things in order
7 June 1952	Sir Robert Eric Mortimer Wheeler	Archaeology and the transmission of ideas
6 June 1953	Raymond William Firth	The study of values by social anthropologists
6 May 1954	Leon Roth	A contemporary moralist: Albert Camus
7 May 1955	Robert Hugh Kirk Marett	Indian civilizations of Mexico and Peru
5 May 1956	Kathleen Mary Kenyon	Jericho and its setting in Near Eastern history
6 June 1957	Sir Alexander Morris Carr-Saunders	The social sciences and the humanities
15 May 1958	Edwin Oliver James	The threshold of religion
11 March 1959	John Bryan Ward-Perkins	A Parthian view of the Eastern frontier of the Roman Empire: the recent excavations at Hatra
7 June 1960	Humayun Kabir	Britain and India
1 February 1961	Herbert Ian Priestly Hogbin	Morality without religion
8 February 1962	Courtney Arthur Ralegh Radford	Evidences of Norse settlement in Britain
2 May 1963	Sir Eric Ashby	An anatomy of academic life
18 February 1965	(Herman) Max Gluckman	Moral crises: Magical and secular solutions
25 February 1965	(Herman) Max Gluckman	Moral crises: Magical and secular solutions
24 February 1966	Stuart Piggott	The origins of the village settlement in prehistoric Europe
18 May 1967	William Calvert Kneale	The responsibility of criminals
9 May 1968	Sir Alister Clavering Hardy	Marett, anthropology and religion
8 May 1969	Jacqueline Worms de Romilly	Historical necessity in the fifth century, B.C.
13 May 1971	Leslie Alcock	South Cadbury excavations - Camelot, 1966–70
4 November 1971	(John Percy Vyvian) Dacre Balsdon	Romulus and Remus; the birth of a legend
18 May 1972	Constantine Athanasius Trypanis	Greek folk songs
8 November 1973	Willard Van Orman Quine	Substitutional quantification
12 November 1974	Meyer Fortes	West African seasonal festivals and the ancestors
20 November 1975	Martin Biddle	Patterns of authority? Problems in the emergence of Anglo-Saxon England
18 November 1976	David Walter Hamlyn	The phenomena of love and hate
3 November 1977	Sir Edmund Ronald Leach	The threshold of religion
14 November 1978	Arthur Ernest Mourant	John Ranulph de la Haule Marett, pioneer biological anthropologist
8 November 1979	Charles Thomas	Hermits on islands or priests in a landscape? Early Christianity in the Isles of Scilly
25 November 1980	Richard G. Swinburne	Are mental events identical with brain events?
12 May 1982	Malcolm Donald McLeod	African art and time
17 May 1983	Dewi Zephaniah Phillips	Primitive reactions and the reactions of primitives
1985	Ernest André Gellner	Anthropology between positivism and romanticism
1986	Edward Thomas Hall	Archaeometry: attempting co-operation between the Arts and Sciences
1987	Bernard Williams	Humans, animals and machines
1988	David Francis Pocock	Persons, texts and morality
8 May 1989	Julian Alfred Lane Fox Pitt-Rivers	From the love of food to the love of God
1990	Jean Sybil La Fontaine	Power, authority and symbols in domestic life
26 April 1991	Thomas R. Trautmann	The revolution in ethnological time
1992	Caroline Humphrey	Rethinking moral authority in post-socialist Mongolia
1993	John David Yeadon Peel	For who hath despised the day of small things? Missionary narratives and historical anthropology
29 April 1994	Fredrik Barth	Ethnicity and the concept of culture
28 April 1995	Alan Donald James Macfarlane	Illth and wealth
26 April 1996	Signe L. Howell	"May blessings come, may mischiefs go!" Living kinds as agents of transition and transformation among the Lio
25 April 1997	Geoffrey Ernest Richard Lloyd	The uses and abuses of classification: Ancient Greek and Chinese reflections
1 May 1998	Ruth Sophia Padel	How myth uses us: Greek "Guyville" and women's rock music
30 April 1999	Martin David Goodman	Explaining religious change
5 May 2000	Piers Vitebsky	Forgetting the ancestors: Living without the dead
27 April 2001	James Patrick Mallory	The cultural worlds of the Indo-Europeans
26 April 2002	Roger Just	Of fishers and boats, and sacrificial goats: Interpreting the commonplace
2 May 2003	Jonathan Webber	Making Sense of the Past: Reflections on Jewish Historical Consciousness
30 April 2004	John Bennet	Archaeologies of Homer
16 September 2005	Harvey Whitehouse	The evolution and history of religion
12 May 2006	Christina Toren	How do we know what is true? The case of mana in Fiji
27 April 2007	Jonathan Parry	Hegemony and resistance: Trade union politics in central India
25 April 2008	Sherry Beth Ortner	Indie producers: Class and the production of value in the American independent film scene
1 May 2009	Scott Atran	Talking to the Enemy: The Dreams, Delusions and Science of Sacred Causes and Conflicts
30 April 2010	Byron J. Good	Theorizing the 'Subject' of Medical and Psychiatric Anthropology
6 May 2011	Terence S. Turner	Beauty and The Beast: Humanity, Animality and Animism in the Thought of an Amazonian People
27 April 2012	Adam Kuper	Anthropologists and the Bible
26 April 2013	Marilyn Strathern	Reading relations backwards
2 May 2014	Birgit Meyer	How to Capture the Wow: Awe and the Study of Religion
1 May 2015	Joel Robbins	What is the matter with transcendence? On the place of religion in the new anthropology of ethics
29 April 2016	Thomas Hylland Eriksen	The Creole world between inequality and difference
28 April 2017	Anna Tsing	What is history? or, the life and times of water hyacinth
27 April 2018	Anne-Christine Taylor	Individualism in the Wild
3 May 2019	Richard Fardon	African Red – African Blue: Ethnography, History and Comparison
2020		No lecture
15 October 2021	Christopher (Kit) Davis	The Ground Beneath Our Feet: Ethnography & Empathy in the 21st Century
29 April 2022	Penny Harvey	Thinking 'in time' about the deep future - nuclear waste and the possibilities of ethnography
13 October 2023	Yael Navaro	Catastrophe and More-than-Human Worlds
25 October 2024	Deborah James	What is ‘distributive labour’? Debt, work, and welfare
24 October 2025	Laura Bear (LSE)	On Whiteness: kinship, care and the racialisation of welfare
23 October 2026	Nils Bubandt	The Anthropocene, Lost and Found. Towards an Eventful, Situated and Patchy Study of Planetary Disruption

== Notes ==
Except where otherwise indicated, dates and titles are from the Oxford University Gazette.
