= Vrysinas =

Archaeological site in Greece

Coordinates: 35°18′42″N 24°29′47″E

Vrysinas (βρύσινας) is a mountain peak south of Rethymno reaching a peak of 858 metres. There is an archaeological site of an ancient Minoan peak sanctuary.

== Geography ==
Aside from Chania, Vrysinas is currently the westernmost discovered Minoan site.

== Archaeology ==
Vrysinas has yielded a single Linear A inscription on the fragment of a stone table. Miniature vases were also found at Vrysinas. Similar vases were found at Petsofas and Karphi.

An eagle talon and several boar's tusks were uniquely found at the Vrysinas peak sanctuary.
