= Eugène Fleischmann =

Israeli philosopher

- Born: 1921; Székesfehérvár, Hungary
- Died: 1990 (aged 68–69)
- Awards: CNRS Silver Medal (1979)

Academic background
- Education: Hebrew University of Jerusalem
- Thesis: The Problem of Christianity in Nineteenth-Century Jewish Philosophy

Academic work
- Discipline: Philosophy
- Institutions: Tel Aviv University

Eugène Jacob Fleischmann (1921–1990) was an Israeli philosopher and professor at Tel Aviv University.

== Biography ==
Fleishman was born in Székesfehérvár, Hungary. In 1940, he immigrated to Israel. From the time of his arrival until 1950, he studied philosophy, Jewish philosophy, and general history at the Hebrew University of Jerusalem; among his teachers were Martin Buber, Julius Guttmann, Hugo Bergmann, and Leon Roth. In 1946, he received his master's degree, and in 1951, his doctorate; his dissertation was The Problem of Christianity in Nineteenth-Century Jewish Philosophy. From 1952 to 1954, he studied at the École Pratique des Hautes Études (EPHE) in Paris, mainly under Alexandre Koyré and Éric Weil. Upon his return, he served as a lecturer (and later senior lecturer) in philosophy at the Hebrew University. In 1958, he also became a research fellow at the French National Center for Scientific Research (CNRS) in Paris. From 1967, he served as a professor of philosophy at Tel Aviv University (heading the department from 1971 to 1973), dividing his time between Tel Aviv and Paris. He lived in Paris during his final years.

== Publications in French ==
- La philosophie politique de Hegel : sous forme d'un commentaire des "Fondements de la philosophie du droit" / Eugène Fleischmann. Paris : Plon, 1964 (Recherches en sciences humaines ; 18).
- La science universelle ou la logique de Hegel / Eugène Fleischmann. Paris : Plon, 1968. (Recherches en sciences humaines ; 25).
- Le christianisme mis à nu : la critique juive du christianisme / Eugène Fleischmann. Paris : Plon, 1970. (Recherches en sciences humaines ; 30).
- La philosophie politique de Hegel : sous forme d'un commentaire des "Fondements de la philosophie du droit" / Eugène Fleischmann. Paris : Gallimard, 1992 (Collection Tel ; 198)
