= Parthena =

Parthena is a Greek feminine name. Notable people with this name include:

- Parthena M. Blank, one of the namesakes of the historic Stephen and Parthena M. Blank House in Oregon, United States
- Parthena Garcos, fictional character in the 1950 American film noir Thieves' Highway
- Parthena Horozidou, Greek actress, competitor in Your Face Sounds Familiar (Greek series 4)
- Parthena Katsaounis, Greek-American statistician
- Parthena Sarafidis, Austrian figure skater

== See also ==
- Mikri Vigla, a Greek island village with a nearby beach named Parthena
