= Minoan peak sanctuaries =

Type of archaeological site on Crete

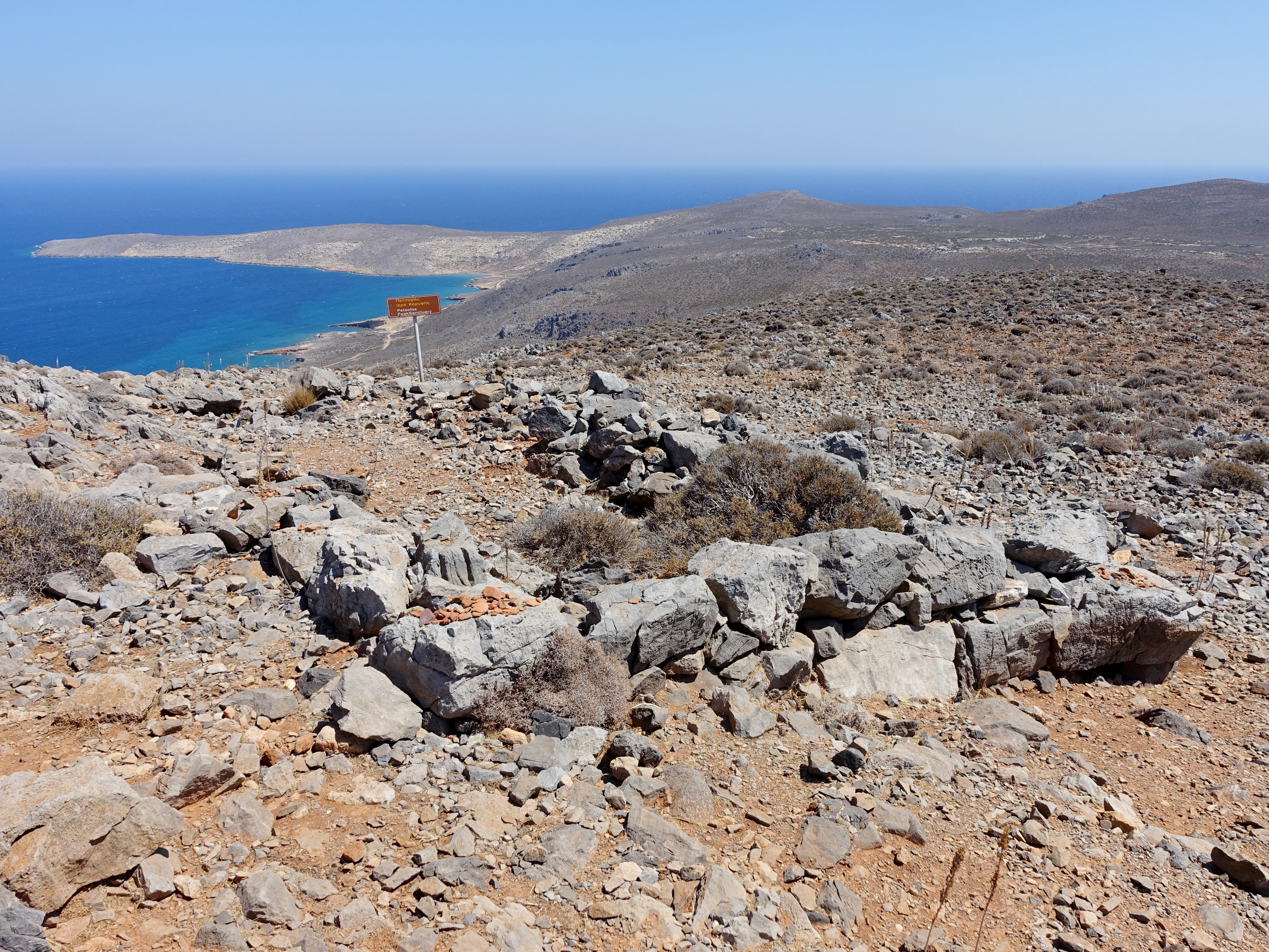
Petsofas peak sanctuary overlooks the Minoan town of Palaikastro

Minoan peak sanctuaries are widespread throughout the island of Crete (Greece). Most scholars agree that peak sanctuaries were used for religious rites high in the mountains of Crete. Human and animal figurines, as well as signs of religious architecture, have been found at most peak sanctuaries. Additionally, votive clay body parts are found at many of these sites. Many of the sanctuaries fell out of use during the Late Bronze Age, when Mycenaeans from the Greek mainland became the dominant culture on the island.

== Eastern and east-central peak sanctuaries ==
Most peak sanctuaries are found in east and east-central Crete.

- Petsofas is the only Minoan site with clay weasel and tortoise figurines
- Traostalos
- Kalamafki (also Kalamaki)
- Ziros Korphi tou Mare
- Xykephalo
- Vigla (also Viglos)
- Zou Prinias
- Plagia
- Etiani Kephala
- Modi: among the finds at the Modi peak sanctuary were clay human and animal figurines.
- Thylakas
- Maza
- Karfi

== Central Crete peak sanctuaries ==
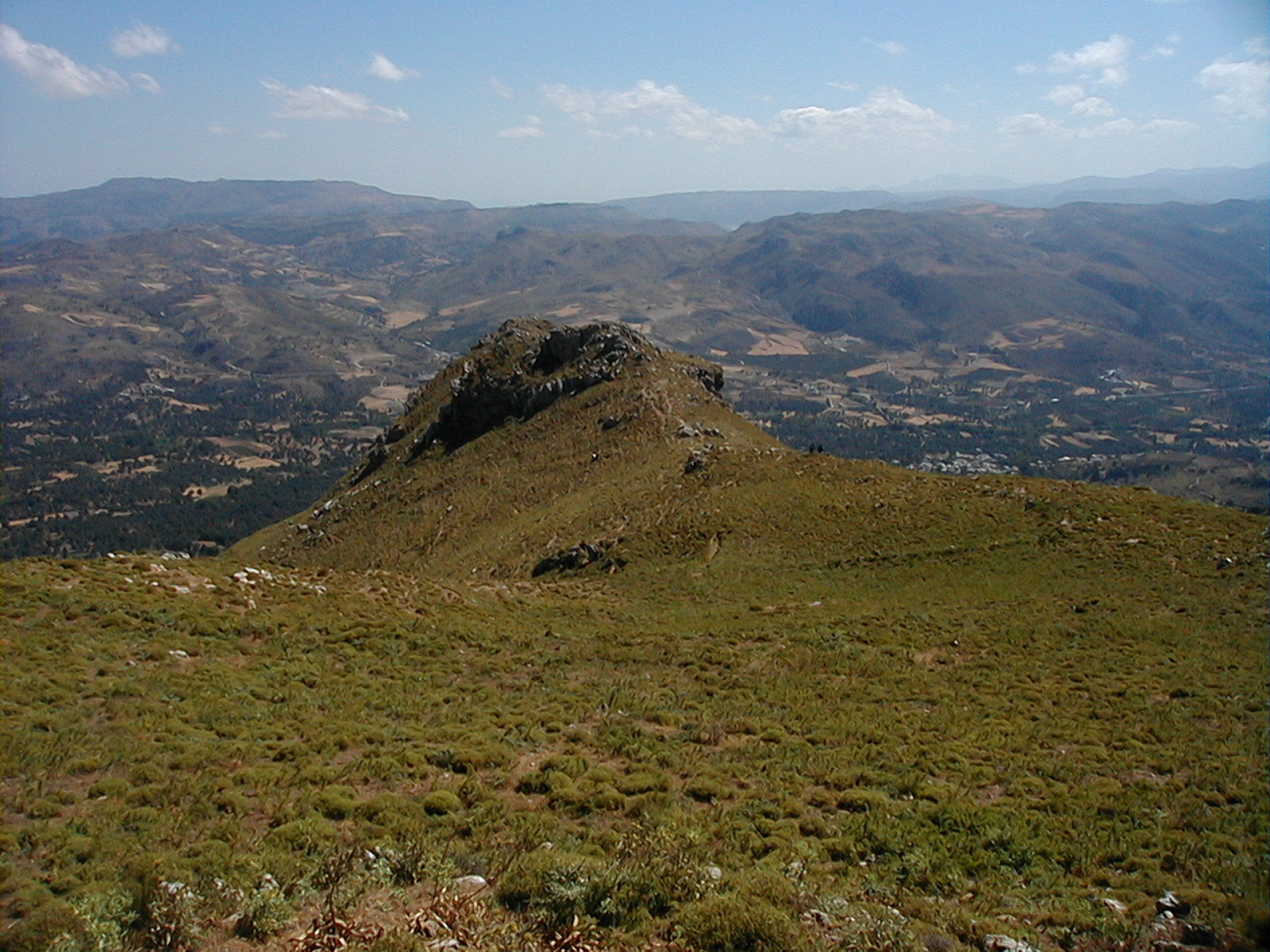
Atsipades Korakias seen from southwest.The sanctuary is on the more distant part of the outcrop. The Ayios Vasilios Plain is visible in the background.

- Iouktas is probably the earliest of the peak sanctuaries.
- Tylissos (also Pyrgos Tylissos, not the same site as Pyrgos)
- Gonies Philioremos

== Western Crete peak sanctuaries ==
- Vrysinas
- Spili Vorizi
- Atsipades in the Korakias mountains was fully excavated in the 1980s. Its many hundred clay figurines and other ceramics have been analysed in detail.

== Other peak sanctuaries ==
This section is for peak sanctuaries mentioned in passing in articles where more research is needed before categorizing them.

- Ambelos
- Mount Ida
- Korakomouri
- Mare

== See also ==
- High place
