= Rebecca Sweetman =

Professor of Ancient History and Archaeology at the University of St Andrews

- Born: 1973 (age 52–53)

Academic background
- Education: University College Dublin, University of Nottingham

Academic work
- Discipline: Classics
- Institutions: University of St Andrews

Rebecca Jane Sweetman (born 1973) is an Irish classical scholar. She is Professor of Ancient History and Archaeology and the former Head of the School of Classics at the University of St Andrews. Sweetman is known in particular for her work on the archaeology of Roman and Late Antique Greece. Since September 2022, she has been Director of the British School at Athens.

== Career ==
Sweetman studied archaeology and classics at University College Dublin. She spent a year working on excavations and then completed her PhD at the University of Nottingham on the Roman and Early Christian Mosaics of Crete.

She was the assistant director of the British School at Athens from 2000 to 2003 and then moved to the University of St Andrews as a lecturer in Ancient History and Archaeology in 2003. She has been Professor of Ancient History and Archaeology since 1 August 2016. She gave her inaugural lecture as professor on 25 September 2019 with a talk entitled 'Resilience in the Wine Dark Sea: the archaeology of Roman Crete and the Cyclades'.

From 2015 to 2016, Sweetman worked on the Christianization of the Cyclades in the late antique period with her Carnegie Trust funded project 'The Late Antique Cyclades: Landscapes, Networks and Christianization'.

In 2015, Sweetman was awarded a Leverhulme Trust Major Fellowship for the project ‘The Roman and Late Antique Cyclades: Networks, Economy and Religion’. The project ran from 2016 to 2018 and included the conference 'Landscapes of Movement: Religious space and topography of the Cyclades, 8th century BCE to 8th century CE' at the University of St Andrews (25-26 May 2017).

Between January and February 2019 she swam in the North Sea 28 times in order to raise money for refugees in Athens.

== Selected publications ==
- 'Networks and church building in the Aegean: Crete, Cyprus, Lycia and the Peloponnese' in Annual of the British School at Athens vol. 112 (November 2017) pp. 207–266
- The Mosaics of Roman Crete: Art, Archaeology and Social Change (Cambridge University Press, 2013)
- (ed.) Roman Colonies in the First Century of Their Foundation (Oxbow, 2011)

Academic offices
| Preceded by John Bennet | Director of the British School at Athens; 2022 to present | Incumbent |
