= James Whitley (archaeologist) =

British archaeologist

Anthony James Monins Whitley, FSA is a British classical archaeologist specialising in the Early Iron Age and Archaic periods of the Mediterranean world. He was Director of the British School at Athens from 2002 to 2007, and Professor of Mediterranean Archaeology at Cardiff University from 2008 to 2025. Having worked at Cardiff University since 1990, he took voluntary redundancy in 2025 when the university undertook cuts including to its ancient history and archaeology provision, but was denied the title of "professor emeritus".

== Honours ==
Whitley was elected Fellow of the Society of Antiquaries of London (FSA) on 4 July 2002.

== Selected works ==
- Whitley, James (1991). Style and society in dark age Greece: the changing face of a pre-literate society 1100-700 BC. Cambridge: Cambridge University Press. ISBN 9780521373838.
- Whitley, James (2001). The archaeology of ancient Greece. Cambridge: Cambridge University Press. ISBN 9780521627337.
- Westgate, Ruth; Fisher, Nick; Whitley, James, eds. (2007). Building communities: house, settlement and society in the Aegean and beyond : proceedings of a conference held at Cardiff University, 17-21 April 2001. London: British School at Athens. ISBN 9780904887563.

Academic offices
Preceded by David Blackman	Director of the British School at Athens; 2002 to 2007	Succeeded by Catherine Morgan
