= John Bennet (archaeologist) =

British archaeologist (born 1957)

John Bennet FSA
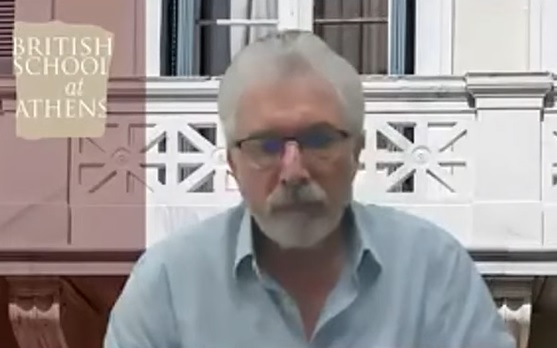
- Professor Bennet during an online Zoom conference in 2021
- Born: Donald John Logan Bennet; 4 June 1957 (age 69); Singapore
- Known for: Director of the British School at Athens (2015 to 2022)
- Title: Professor Emeritus of Aegean Archaeology
- Spouse: Deborah
- Awards: Fellow of the Society of Antiquaries of London

Academic background
- Education: University of Cambridge
- Doctoral advisor: John F. Cherry

Academic work
- Discipline: Archaeology and Classics
- Sub-discipline: Minoan civilisation; Mycenaean civilisation; Bronze Age Aegean; Linear B
- Institutions: Sidney Sussex College, Cambridge; University of Wisconsin–Madison; Keble College, Oxford; University of Oxford; University of Sheffield; British School at Athens

Donald John Logan Bennet, FSA (born 4 June 1957), known as John Bennet, is a British archaeologist, classicist, and academic, who specialises in the Aegean civilisations. He was Professor of Aegean Archaeology at the University of Sheffield from 2004 until his retirement in 2024, and was Director of the British School at Athens from 2015 to 2022. He previously taught at the University of Cambridge, the University of Wisconsin–Madison and the University of Oxford.

== Early life and education ==
Bennet was born in Singapore and was brought up in Yorkshire, England. He attended Bradford Grammar School before studying the Classical Tripos at Sidney Sussex College, Cambridge, graduating with a first class Bachelor of Arts (BA) degree in 1980. He remained at Cambridge to undertake postgraduate research on "The administrative organization of Late Minoan II–IIIB Crete based on archaeological and textual (Linear B) evidence": his supervisor was John F. Cherry. He completed his Doctor of Philosophy (PhD) degree in 1986.

== Academic career ==
Bennet began his academic career as a junior research fellow at Sidney Sussex College from 1983 to 1986. In 1986, after completing his doctorate, he moved to the United States and joined the Department of Classics of the University of Wisconsin–Madison in Madison, Wisconsin. He was a Visiting assistant professor of Classics for the first year, an assistant professor of classics from 1987 to 1991, and achieved tenure as an associate professor of Classics from 1991 to 1995. In 1995, he was appointed a professor of classics.

In 1998, Bennet returned to England and joined the University of Oxford as the Sinclair & Rachel Hood Lecturer in Aegean Prehistory. The lectureship was attached to Keble College, Oxford, and so he was elected a Fellow of the college upon taking up the appointment. In April 2004, he gave the Marett Memorial Lecture at Exeter College, Oxford; this lecture was titled "Archaeologies of Homer".

In January 2004, Bennet was appointed Professor of Aegean Archaeology at the University of Sheffield. He has served as Director of the Sheffield Centre for Aegean Archaeology since 2004, and was Head of Department of Archaeology between 2006 and 2010. He served as Director of the British School at Athens from October 2015 to September 2022, returning thereafter to Sheffield. In addition to directing the School's operation in Greece, he was also co-editor of the BSA Annual and Editor of its publication series.

== Personal life ==
Bennet is married to Deborah.

== Honours ==
On 19 November 2015, Bennet was elected a Fellow of the Society of Antiquaries of London (FSA).

== Selected work ==
- Zarinebaf, Fariba; Bennet, John; Davis, Jack L. (2005). A historical and economic geography of Ottoman Greece the southwestern Morea in the 18th century. Princeton, N.J.: American School of Classical Studies at Athens. ISBN 978-0876615348.
- Baines, John; Bennet, John; Houston, Stephen, eds. (2008). The disappearance of writing systems: perspectives on literacy and communication. London: Equinox. ISBN 978-1845530136.
- Wilkinson, Toby C.; Sherratt, Susan; Bennet, John, eds. (2011). Interweaving worlds: systemic interactions in Eurasia, 7th to 1st millennia BC. Oakville, CT: Oxbow Books. ISBN 978-1842179987.
- Galanakis, Yannis; Wilkinson, Toby; Bennet, John, eds. (2014). ΑΘΥΡΜΑΤΑ: Critical Essays on the Archaeology of the Eastern Mediterranean in Honour of E. Susan Sherratt. Oxford: Archaeopress. ISBN 978-1784910198.
- Sherratt, Susan; Bennet, John, eds. (2016). Archaeology and the Homeric Epic. Oxford: Oxbow Books. ISBN 978-1785702952.

Academic offices
Preceded by Catherine Morgan	Director of the British School at Athens; 2015 to 2022	Succeeded by Rebecca Sweetman
