= Catherine Morgan =

Professor Catherine Morgan OBE FBA
- Born: 1961 (age 64–65)

Academic background
- Education: Clare College, Cambridge
- Thesis: Settlement and exploitation in the region of the Corinthian Gulf, c.1000-700 BC (1986)

Academic work
- Discipline: Ancient history Archaeology
- Sub-discipline: Classical archaeology Greek Dark Ages; Archaic Greece; Landscape archaeology
- Institutions: Trinity Hall, Cambridge; Sidney Sussex College, Cambridge; Royal Holloway, University of London; King's College London; British School at Athens; All Souls College, Oxford

Catherine Anne Morgan, OBE, FBA (born 1961) is a British academic specialising in the history and archaeology of Early Iron Age and Archaic Greece. Since 2015, she has been a Senior Research Fellow at All Souls College, Oxford. She was Professor of Classical Archaeology at King's College London from 2005 to 2015, and director of the British School at Athens from 2007 to 2015.

== Early life and education ==
Morgan was born in 1961. From 1980 to 1983, she studied archaeology and anthropology at Clare College, Cambridge. She remained at Clare College to study for a Doctor of Philosophy (PhD) degree in classical archaeology. Her doctoral supervisor was Anthony Snodgrass. Her doctoral thesis, titled "Settlement and exploitation in the region of the Corinthian Gulf, c.1000-700 BC", was completed in 1986.

== Academic career ==
Morgan began her academic career as a Junior Research Fellow of Trinity Hall, Cambridge between 1983 and 1986. She was then a Senior Research Fellow of Sidney Sussex College, Cambridge. She moved from the University of Cambridge to Royal Holloway, University of London in 1992. There, she was a lecturer in classics until 1997.

In 1997, Morgan moved to King's College London. She was a lecturer and then reader, before being appointed Professor of Classical Archaeology in 2005. In 2012, she was visiting professor at the Australian Archaeological Institute at Athens. From 2007 to 2015, she served as the twenty second director of the British School at Athens.

In October 2015, she was appointed a senior research fellow in classics at All Souls College, University of Oxford. She is also Professor of Classics and Archaeology at the University of Oxford.

== Honours ==
In the 2012 Queen's Birthday Honours, Morgan was appointed Officer of the Order of the British Empire (OBE) 'for services to classical scholarship'.

In 2011, Morgan was elected a Corresponding Member of the Archaeological Institute of America. In May 2014, she was elected a Corresponding Member of the German Archaeological Institute. She is also an Honorary Member of the Archaeological Society of Athens. In July 2016, she was elected a Fellow of the British Academy (FBA), the UK's national academy for the humanities and the social sciences.

== Selected works ==
- Morgan, Catherine (1990). Athletes and oracles: the transformation of Olympia and Delphi in the eighth century BC. Cambridge: Cambridge University Press. ISBN 978-0521374514.
- Morgan, Catherine (2003). Early Greek states beyond the polis. London: Routledge. ISBN 978-0415089968.
- Morgan, Catherine (2004). Attic Fine Pottery of the Archaic to Hellenistic Periods in Phanagoria. Leiden: Brill. ISBN 978-9004138889.
- Hornblower, Simon; Morgan, Catherine, eds. (2007). Pindar's Poetry, Patrons, and Festivals: From Archaic Greece to the Roman Empire. Oxford: Oxford University Press. ISBN 978-0199296729.
- Macfarlane, Fiona; Morgan, Catherine, eds. (2010). Exploring ancient sculpture: essays in honour of Geoffrey Waywell. London: Institute of Classical Studies, University of London. ISBN 978-1905670208.

Academic offices
Preceded by James Whitley	Director of the British School at Athens; 2007 to 2015	Succeeded by John Bennet
