= Traostalos =

Minoan peak sanctuary in eastern Crete

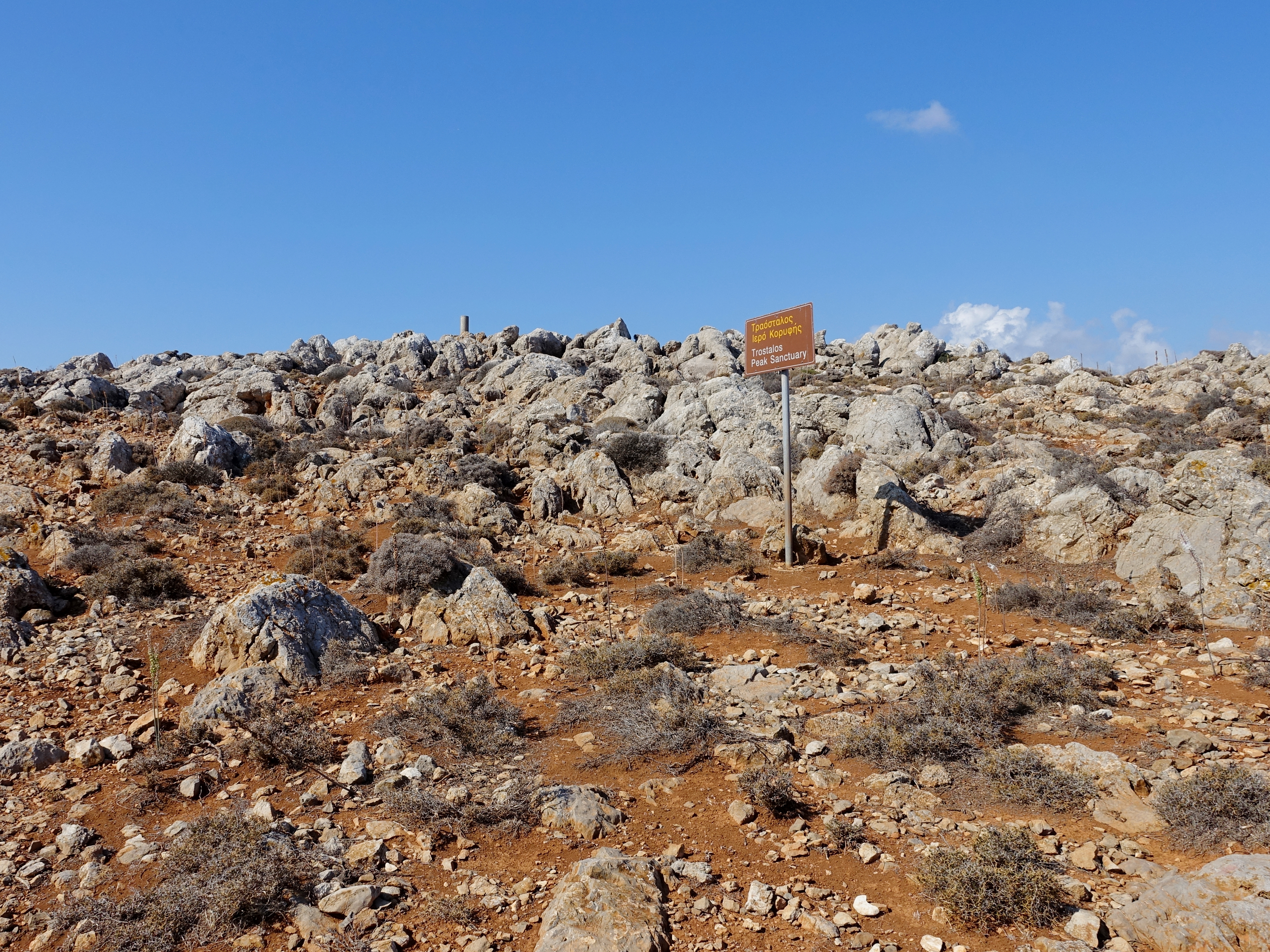

Highest point
- Elevation: 515 m (1,690 ft)

Geography
- Range coordinates: 35°07′35″N 26°16′02″E

Traostalos is the archaeological site of a Minoan peak sanctuary in eastern Crete.

== Archaeology ==
Traostalos was first excavated in 1963-1964 under Kostis Davaras. Davaras returned in 1978 to continue that work. A rescue excavation from April to October 1995 was led by Stella Chryssoulaki.

Along with the usual clay human and animal figurines common to peak sanctuaries, Traostalos has, notably, a female figure with a swollen leg. Other finds at Traostalos include ceramic boats and stone altars.

== Bibliography ==
- Jones, Donald W. 1999 Peak Sanctuaries and Sacred Caves in Minoan Crete ISBN 91-7081-153-9
- Chryssoulaki, Stella The Traostalos Peak Sanctuary: Aspects of Spatial Organization Retrieved 19 January 2006
