= Petsofas =

Minoan archaeological site in Crete, Greece

- Πετσοφάς (Greek)
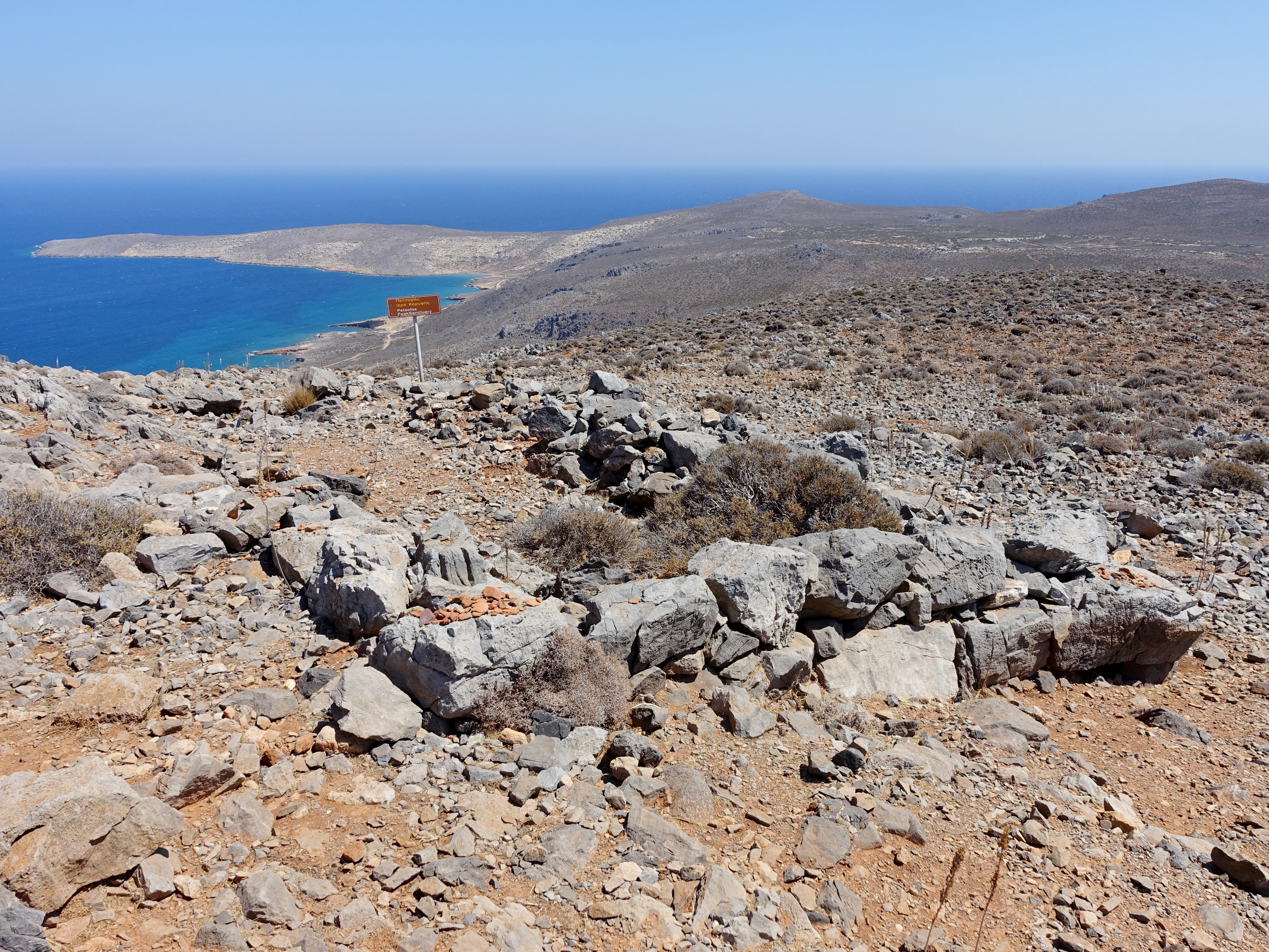
- Remains of the peak sanctuary, showing the foundations of the Neopalatial room

- Location within Greece
- 35.1869°N 26.2789°E
- Type: Peak sanctuary
- Periods: Protopalatial; Neopalatial
- Cultures: Minoan

Site notes
- Elevation: 255 m (837 ft)
- Excavation dates: 1903; 1971
- Archaeologists: John Myres; Charles Trick Currelly; Costas Davaras

Petsofas (also spelt Petsophas) is an archaeological site in eastern Crete. It was the site of a Minoan peak sanctuary associated with the nearby palatial site of Palaikastro, and was used between the Middle Minoan I period (c. 2000 – c. 1800 BCE) and the Neopalatial period (that is, until shortly after c. 1925 – c. 1900 BCE).

The site consisted of a small enclosure, probably open to the air, in which thousands of clay figurines and burnt offerings were left in the early phase of the site's occupation. Unlike most peak sanctuaries, it continued to be used in the Neopalatial period, when the enclosure was built upon with a two-roomed structure, which seems to have continued to see ritual use on a smaller scale than the previous activity at the site. The figurines include representations of human beings, generally thought to stand for worshippers; sacrificial animals; and human limbs usually thought to be associated with requests for divine healing. In the Neopalatial period, objects deposited at the sanctuary included two libation tables inscribed in Linear A.

John Myres made the first excavations of Petsofas in 1903, making it the first Cretan peak sanctuary to be systematically excavated. Charles Trick Currelly finished the 1903 season, and the site was re-excavated in 1971 by Costas Davaras.

== History ==
The peak sanctuary at Petsofas consists of a small enclosure, somewhat over 170 m^{2} (0.017 ha) in area, (Note: Müller 2015, p. 115. For the dates of the Middle Minoan I period, see Shelmerdine 2008, p. 4.) overlooking the palatial site of Palaikastro from the south. The two sites are less than 30 minutes' walk apart, suggesting that they were closely associated. Petsofas was first used in the Middle Minoan I period (c. 2000 – c. 1800 BCE), (Note: Müller 2015, p. 115. For the dates of the Middle Minoan I period, see Shelmerdine 2008, p. 4.) whose latter part is included in the Protopalatial period of Minoan civilisation. Like most Minoan peak sanctuaries, it is located on a prominent mountain top, and readily visible from the nearest known contemporary habitation sites. It was one of the few peak sanctuaries to remain in use during the Neopalatial period (that is, after c. 1925 – c. 1900 BCE). (Note: Poursat 2022, p. 134. For the dates, see Rutter, Jeremy. "Chronology Overview: The Chronology and Terminology of Aegean Prehistory". Aegean Prehistoric Archaeology. Dartmouth University.)

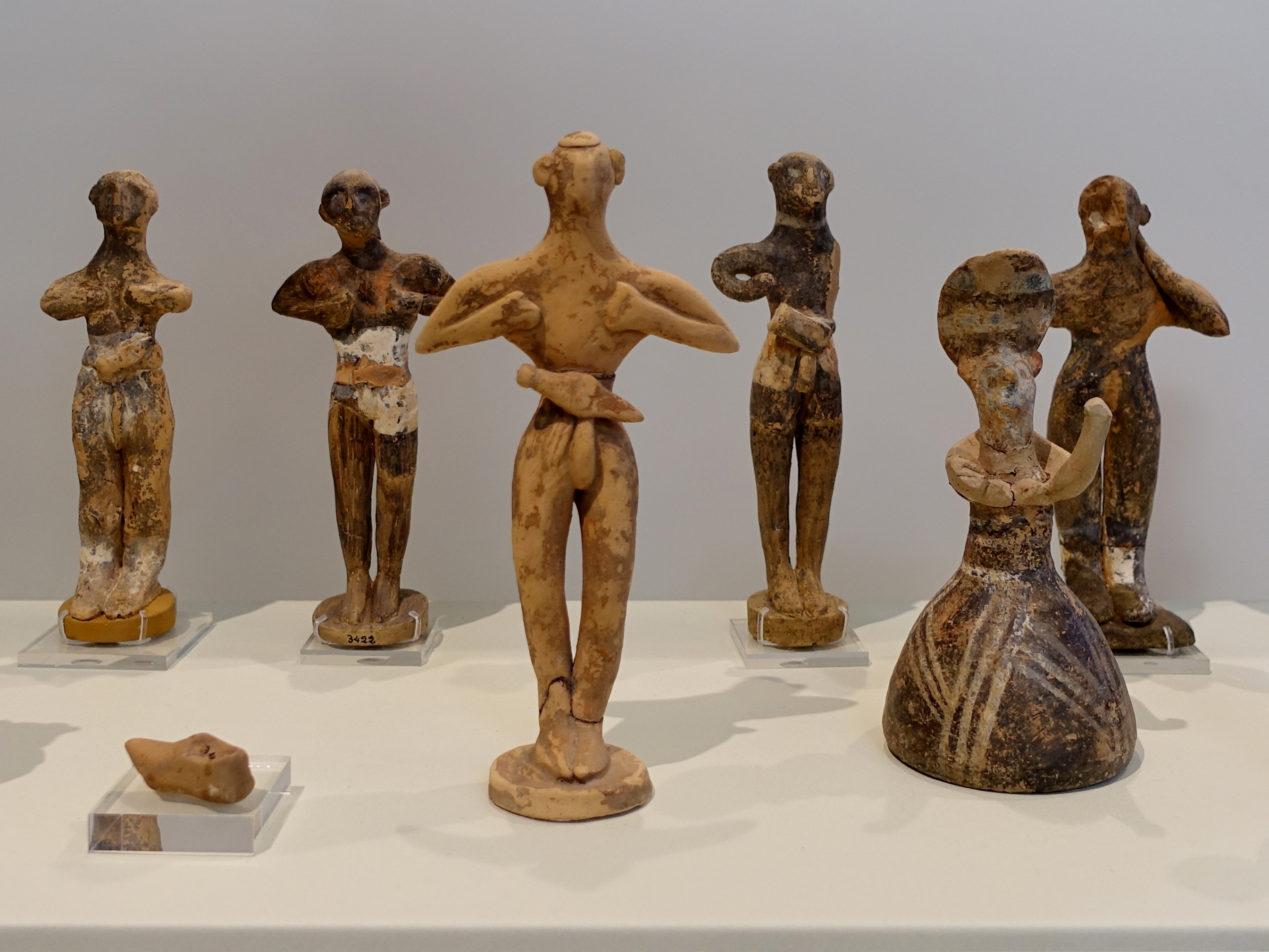
Clay humanoid figurines found at Pesofas, Protopalatial period

The enclosure at Petsofas was filled with a thick layer of ash. This layer contained several thousand clay figurines of both humans and animals, including anatomical models known as "votive limbs". These are generally believed to have been offered by worshippers seeking divine healing, though other proposed interpretations include Jeremy Rutter's suggestion that they are parts of complete figurines, and that of Martin P. Nilsson that they may have been intended to stand in for real body parts in a ritual of sacrifice or dismemberment. Among the figurines is a model of a pregnant woman, possibly offered by a dedicant hoping for safety in childbirth. Most of the figures seem to have been offered during the earlier Protopalatial period, particularly a few decorated in the Kamares style, though others seem to be Neopalatial: among the Neopalatial material are objects inscribed in the Cretan Linear A script. The humanoid figurines are generally taken to represent worshippers rather than deities, on the basis of their ordinary-seeming clothing, while the animals are considered to stand for sacrificial offerings.

There is no definitive evidence of buildings in the first (Protopalatial) phase of the site's use: Bogdan Rutkowski suggests that it was an open-air enclosure with a few altars. In the Neopalatial period, a building was constructed above the layer of ash and offerings, consisting of two small rectangular rooms. One of these rooms had a bench approximately 25 centimetres (10 in) in height and a rough stone lamp; almost nothing of the second was preserved. It is possible that cultic activity continued in this building, as it had in the preceding enclosure, but this seems to have been on a smaller scale: Katrin Müller considers it unproven whether this was in truth a cultic building, or if the structure was considered sacred.

== Archaeological study ==
Petsofas was the first Cretan peak sanctuary to be systematically excavated, by John Myres in 1903 as part of a British School at Athens (BSA) expedition to Palaikastro. Myres excavated the site from April, with what Robert Carr Bosanquet, the director of the BSA, described as "brilliant results", particularly on the basis of Myres's finds of human and animal figurines. At the end of the season, Myres returned to his academic post in Oxford, and the Canadian Charles Trick Currelly took over the excavation, approximately doubling the number of finds recovered. (Note: Bosanquet 1902–1903, p. 276. On Currelly's involvement with the BSA excavation, see Gill 2011, pp. 234–235.)

It was re-excavated by Costis Davaras in the summer of 1971. in response to reports that fragments figurines had been discovered at and potentially looted from the site. This excavation explored areas to the east and south of the LM I building, not excavated in 1903, and discovered what Davaras considered the main deposits made at the sanctuary: these included two libation tables, inscribed in Linear A, dating to the Neopalatial period. In 2014, Christine Morris and Alan Peatfield described Petsofas as the best known of all the excavated Minoan peak sanctuaries.

== Works cited ==
- Adams, Ellen (2017). Cultural Identity in Minoan Crete: Social Dynamics in the Neo-Palatial Period. Cambridge University Press. ISBN 978-1-107-19752-7.
- Arnott, Robert (2014). "Healers and Medicines in the Mycenaean Greek Texts". In Michaelides, Demetrios (ed.). Medicine and Healing in the Ancient Mediterranean World. Oxford and Philadelphia: Oxbow Books. pp. 44–53. ISBN 978-1-78297-235-8.
- Bosanquet, Robert Carr (1902–1903). "Excavations at Palaikastro: II: The Second Campaign – Outlying Sites". Annual of the British School at Athens. 9: 274–277. doi:10.1017/S006824540000770X. JSTOR 30096273.
- Budin, Stephanie Lynn (2011). Images of Woman and Child from the Bronze Age: Reconsidering Fertility, Maternity and Gender in the Ancient World. Cambridge University Press. ISBN 978-0-521-19304-7.
- Davaras, Costis (1972). "Two New Linear A Inscriptions on Libation Vessels from Petsophas". Kadmos. 11 (2): 101–140. doi:10.1515/kadm.1972.11.2.101 – via Academia.edu.
- Gill, David (2011). Sifting the Soil of Greece: The Early Years of the British School at Athens (1886–1919). Bulletin of the Institute of Classical Studies Supplements. Vol. 111. London: Institute of Classical Studies. pp. iii–474. ISBN 978-1-905670-32-1. JSTOR 44214938.
- Manning, Stuart W. (2010). "Chronology and Terminology". In Cline, Eric (ed.). The Oxford Handbook of the Bronze Age Aegean. Oxford University Press. pp. 11–30. ISBN 978-0-19-536550-4.
- Mantzourani, Eleni (2012). "Biography of Costis Davaras". In Betancourt, Philip; Mantzourani, Eleni (eds.). Philistor: Studies in Honor of Costis Davaras. Philadelphia: INSTAP Academic Press. pp. xxi–xxiv. ISBN 978-1-931534-65-9.
- Morris, Christine; Peatfield, Alan (2014). "Health and Healing on Cretan Bronze Age Peak Sanctuaries". In Michaelides, Demetrios (ed.). Medicine and Healing in the Ancient Mediterranean World. Oxford and Philadelphia: Oxbow Books. pp. 44–53. ISBN 978-1-78297-235-8.
- Müller, Kathrin (2015). "Defining Minoan 'Cult Rooms': Past and Present Approaches to the Archaeology of Cult". In Cappel, Sarah; Günkel-Maschek, Ute; Panagiotopoulos, Diamantis (eds.). Minoan Archaeology: Perspectives for the 21st Century. Presses Universitaires de Louvain. pp. 109–124. ISBN 978-2-87558-395-6.
- Myres, John L. (1902–1903). "Excavations at Palaikastro: II: The Sanctuary-Stie of Petsofa". Annual of the British School at Athens. 9: 356–387. doi:10.1017/S0068245400007826. JSTOR 30096273.
- Nowicki, Krzystof (2012). "East Cretan Peak Sanctuaries Revisited". In Betancourt, Philip; Mantzourani, Eleni (eds.). Philistor: Studies in Honor of Costis Davaras. Philadelphia: INSTAP Academic Press. pp. 139–154. ISBN 978-1-931534-65-9.
- Poursat, Jean-Claude (2022). The Art and Archaeology of the Aegean Bronze Age: A History. Translated by Knappett, Carl. Cambridge University Press. doi:10.1017/9781108630672. ISBN 978-1-108-63067-2.
- Prent, Mieke (2005). Cretan Sanctuaries and Cults: Continuity and Change from Late Minoan IIIC to the Archaic Period. Religions in the Graeco-Roman World. Vol. 154. Leiden: Brill. ISBN 90-04-14236-3.
- Rutkowski, Bogdan (1991). Petsophas: A Cretan Peak Sanctuary. Warsaw: Art and Archaeology. ISBN 83-221-0615-7.
- Shelmerdine, Cynthia (2008). "Introduction: Background, Methods and Sources". In Shelmerdine, Cynthia (ed.). The Cambridge Companion to the Aegean Bronze Age. Cambridge: Cambridge University Press. pp. 1–18.
