= Vigla =

Vigla (Greek: Βίγλα, "watch, lookout") may refer to:

== Places ==
- Vigla (ski resort), a ski resort near Florina
- Vigla, Arta, a village in the Arta regional unit
- Vigla, Mount Athos, a settlement in Mount Athos
- Mikri Vigla, a small village on the island of Naxos
- Kaki Vigla, a small village on the island of Salamis
- The highest peak of Mount Kerkis on the island of Samos
- Vigla Formation, a geologic formation in Greece and Albania

== Other uses ==
- Vigla (tagma), a Byzantine cavalry unit
