= Atsipades =

Archaeological site in Crete, Greece

Coordinates: 35.224°N 24.453°E

Atsipades (Greek: Ατσιπάδες) is an archaeological site of a Minoan peak sanctuary in western Crete. It is an open-air peak sanctuary, situated on a mountain and open to the elements. It was discovered by K. Nowicki in 1985.

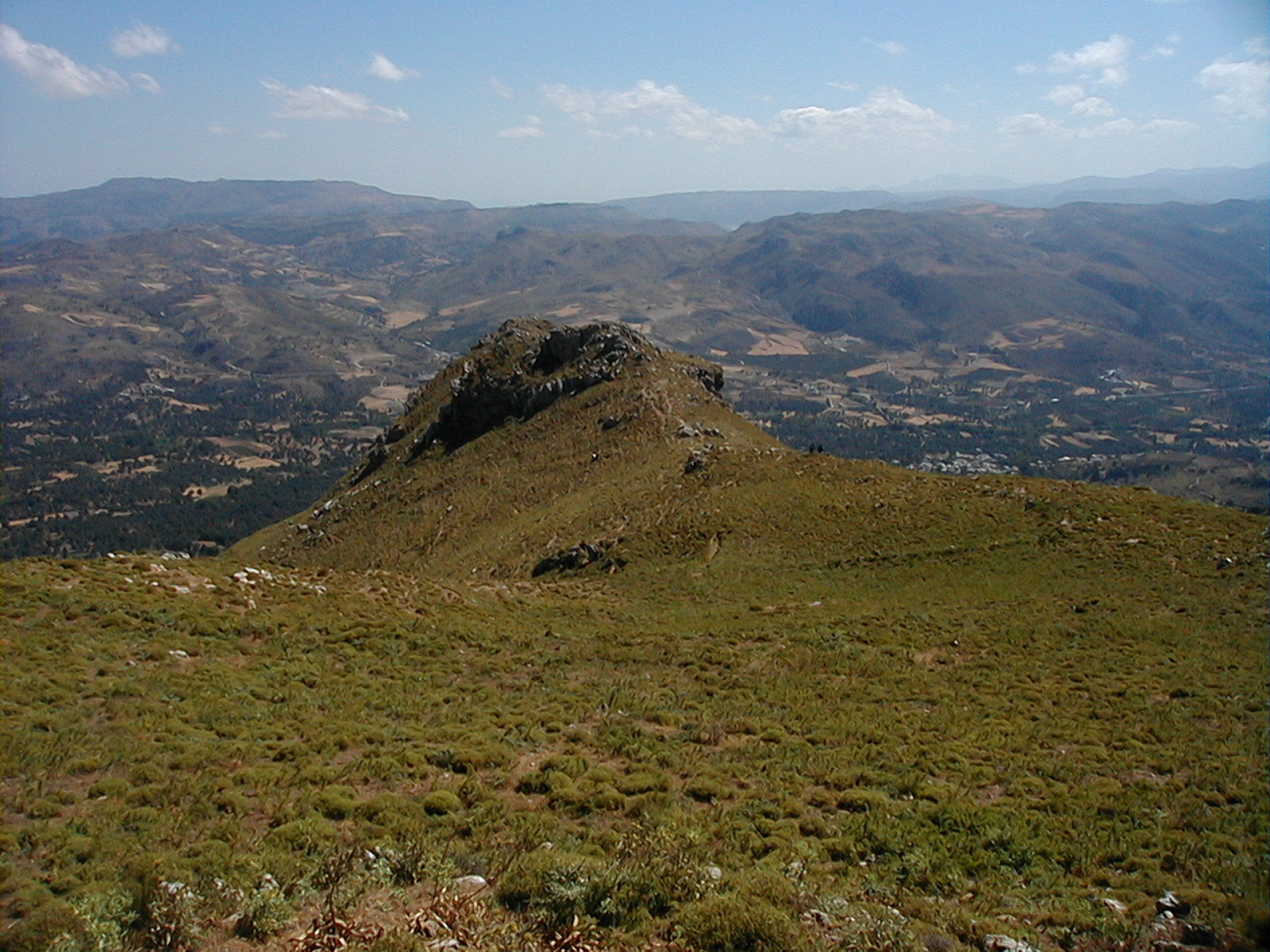
Atsipades Korakias seen from the southwest. The sanctuary is on the more distant part of the outcrop. The Ayios Vasilios Plain is visible in the background.

== Location ==
Atsipades (Greek: Ατσιπάδες,) is an archaeological site of a Minoan peak sanctuary in western Crete, located on the top of the mountain. The peak has its own specific name, Atsipades Korakias. It is an open-air peak sanctuary, situated on a mountain and open to the elements. The sanctuary isn't closed off or part of any structure with a cover or roof. The location of the sanctuary, and more specifically the view, play a significant role in the experience of those who made the journey to the top. From the top of the sanctuary, the view showed the surrounding Minoan settlements.

== Atsipades Korakias ==
Atsipades Korakias is characterized by twin peaks. The autumn equinox at Astipades can be seen between the peaks. This geographical feature directly relates to the relationship between the rising sun and Minoan buildings. Votives, such as animal figurines, human figurines, and bowls, are often found in rock clefts at Astipades.

== Upper and lower terrace ==
The votives were found in two distinct areas: the upper terrace in the west and the lower terrace in the east.

Upper: The sanctuary makes up the east edge of the upper terrace. On the highest point of the mountain, there is a void circle found amongst a high concentration of pebbles. It is supposed that a baetyl or vessel was originally there which created this void when pebbles were placed or thrown there. The pebbles came from a neighboring river in the valley where the people collected the pebbles and brought them up the mountain to be used for this purpose. This location is also characterised by a cliff. The upper terrace had a good view of the surrounding area but the peak blocked the view of the closest settlements. The rock clefts that are below the drop from the upper terrace play a significant role in the sanctuary, more specifically the votive offerings and rituals that occurred. Sixty percent of the votive offerings at this sanctuary were found in the clefts. From this, the archeologist Alan Peatfield was able to categorize it as the main location where votive offerings occurred at Atsipades, and thus a main part of the ritualistic practices that occurred at the sanctuary.

Lower: The lower terrace is a flat open area with a better view of the closest settlements to Atsipades than the upper terrace. The sanctuary makes up a large portion of this terrace. Similarly to the upper terrace, votives and other pottery were found in the rock clefts of this terrace during excavation.

== History ==
Atsipades is located above the village Atsipades, Agios Vasilios. It was discovered by K. Nowicki in 1985. In 1986 it was classified as a peak sanctuary and in 1989, it was excavated by Alan Peatfield. The sanctuary was used by Minoans during a time period of around 2300 B.C.E. to 1700 B.C.E. This span of time can be categorized into three specific time periods: Early Minoan III, Middle Minoan I, and Middle Minoan II. Peatfield was able to discover this via the materials that he discovered in the sanctuary during his excavation. The Early Minaoan III period starts at around 2300 B.C.E. The Middle Minoan I period goes from around 2000 B.C.E. to 1800 B.C.E. The final period, Middle Minoan II, took place around 1700 B.C.E. Materials such as cups, votives, and other pottery were found from all of these periods, yet most votives and pottery were found from the Middle Minoan II period. This finding led Peatfield and other archaeologists to conclude that the Minoans used the sanctuary to a greater extent in that period than in any of the other periods. There is no evidence that the sanctuary was used after the Middle Minoan II period. Although the site is described as a Minoan peak sanctuary, final Neolithic pottery was found in cracks in the rock on the lowermost of the two terraces. The fact that the sanctuary was actively used during this wide range of time shows that the idea of the Minoan Peak sanctuary was an integral part of society and lasted for a great deal of time.

== Religion ==
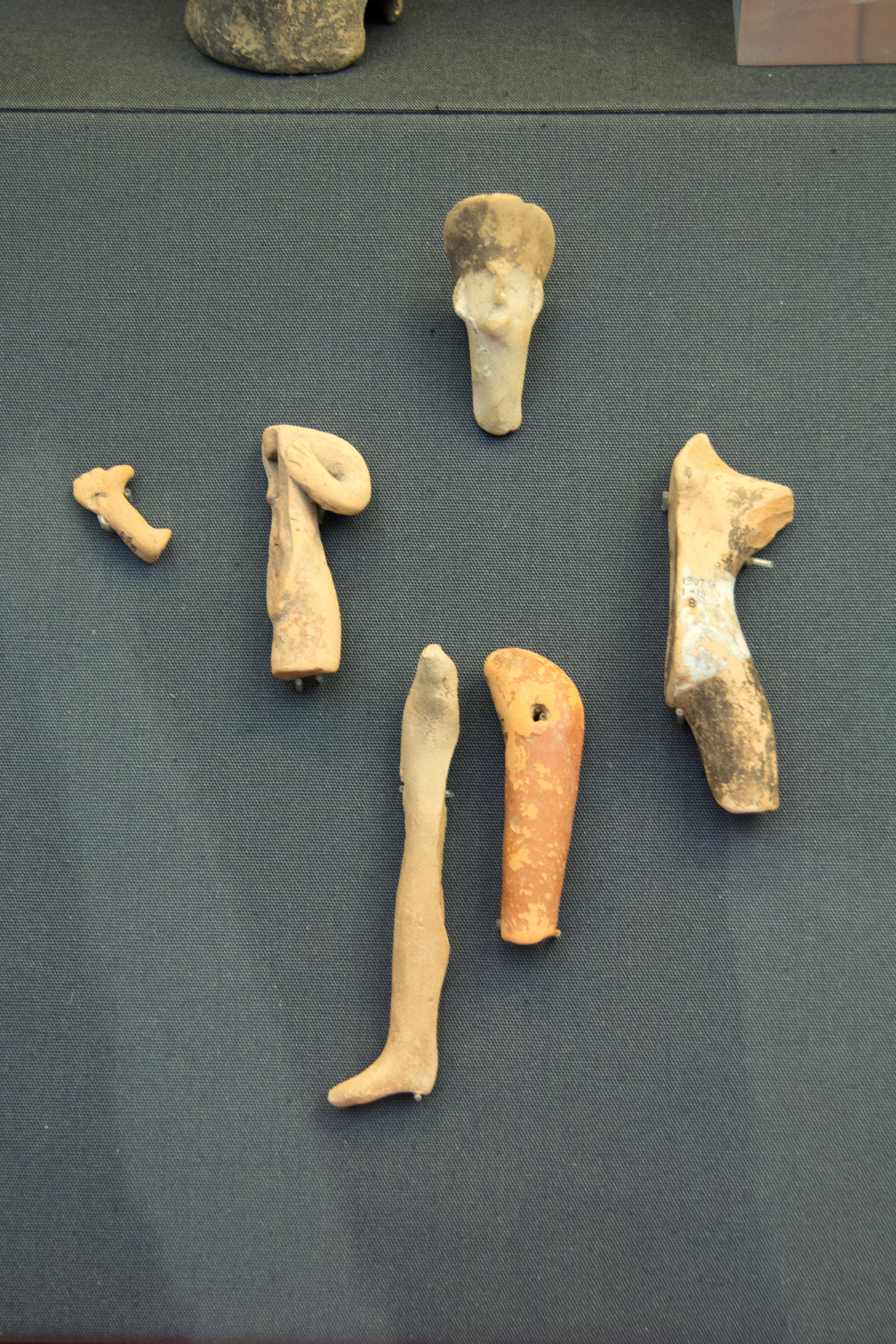
Examples of ancient Minoan votives of body parts.

Atsipades was used for ancient Minoan religious rites. The sanctuary belonged to the entire community, who were free to use it to serve their religious needs. Peak sanctuaries commonly were located at a high peak, since the experience of climbing close to the sky near dangerous cliff edges contributed to the religious experience and symbolically brought the individual closer to the gods. The ritualistic experience of climbing up the mountain holding a votive or pebble played a major role in the religious aspect of the peak sanctuary. Offerings, such as the votives of pebbles, were given to the gods as a way to gain their favor or goodwill. As many people from the community used the peak sanctuary, visiting the peak sanctuary became a social experience where people would be able to show their piety and their wealth through the votives and offerings that they deposited.

== Votives ==
Around 5,000 terracotta votive fragments, either animal or human-like figurines, were found at Astipades. The human figurines were primarily male, while the animal figurines were mostly cattle. The male human figurines had variations in hair, and clothing, while some had weapons. The female figurines also varied, with many having skirts or long dresses with open bodices and headgear. These votives align with the common style, customs of attire, and hairstyles of Minoans at that time.

These votives reveal a multitude of information about the community that used them. The clay material corroborates the idea that it was used primarily by the common people rather than the aristocracy. The figurines were made with a cheap and coarse clay, and were decorated plainly. A more exclusive sanctuary that was primarily used by elites would have votives made of a higher quality clay, often with painted embellishments to display wealth. Research into the settlements around the sanctuary shows that they were consistent with a poorer and rural community. The settlements were small, and consisted of farmsteads and hamlets with no large towns or aristocratic villas.

The votives also demonstrate the purposes of the sanctuaries. The clay figurines, which included animals, anthropomorphic forms and votive limbs, corroborates the idea that this sanctuary's purpose was healing. The worshipers deposited the human figures which were symbolic of themselves at the sanctuary. The votive limbs specifically reflected gratitude for the healing through a performative aspect of prayer. At other Minoan peak sanctuaries, votive limbs and human figures are used by similar healing cults.

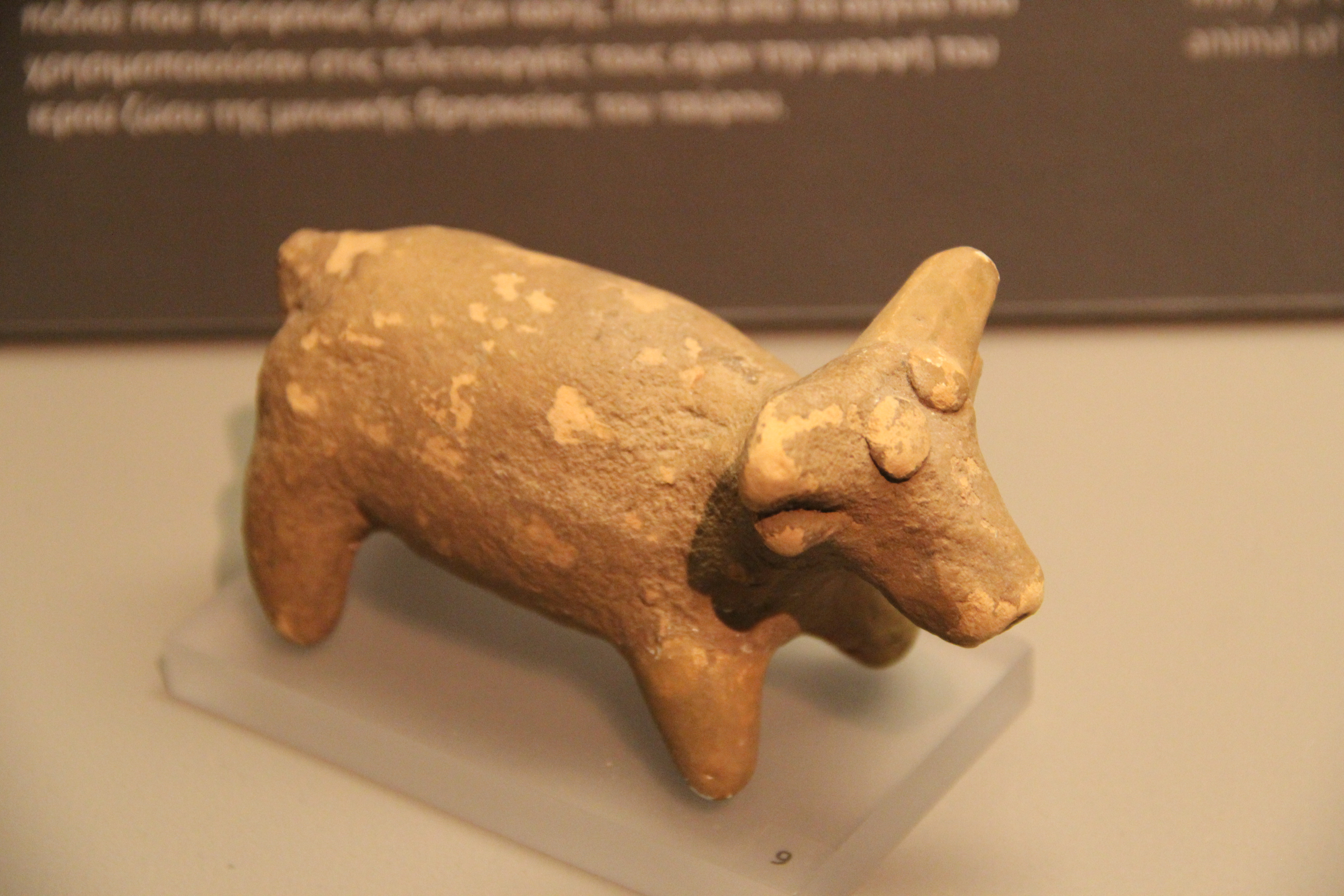
Example of an ancient Minoan clay animal votive.

Settlements found by an archaeological field survey in the nearby Ayios Vasilios Valley suggest that this peak sanctuary served a rural community of farmsteads and hamlets. The domestic or farm animal votives further serve to emphasize the agricultural needs prioritized by those that used the sanctuary. Cattle votives were the most prominent animal votive found, showing the economic dominance of cattle-breeding in that area. The significance of cattle economically is further corroborated by records from travelers.

== Purposes and functions ==
People primarily used the sanctuary by climbing the mountain carrying pebbles and votives to deposit at the sanctuary as a form of offering. The use of pebbles shows that this was a rural nature cult, as the offerings the people gave to the gods reflected their needs and status. It would appear that the worshippers at Astipades were from the local area, as regional materials and style preferences differ at other sanctuaries. The quality of votive materials and the information we know about the community reflect that the sanctuary was used by the peasant class. The fact that the votives offered were of animals and humans shows the peasant class' focus on daily and personal concerns. The peasants' ritualistic practice of depositing pebbles and votives served the purpose of increasing the fertility both of the earth (for agriculture) and the domesticated animals. It also catered to the health concerns of the community. The clay figurines, which include animals, anthropomorphic forms, and votive limbs, corroborates the idea that this sanctuary's purpose was healing. The animal votives were mostly of cattle which shows their value to the society that used the sanctuary. Cattle were incredibly important to the peasant community which relied on them economically. Excavations of Astipades found no evidence that the site was used for burning ritual fires or the cooking of ritual meals, as there was no ash or burned materials.

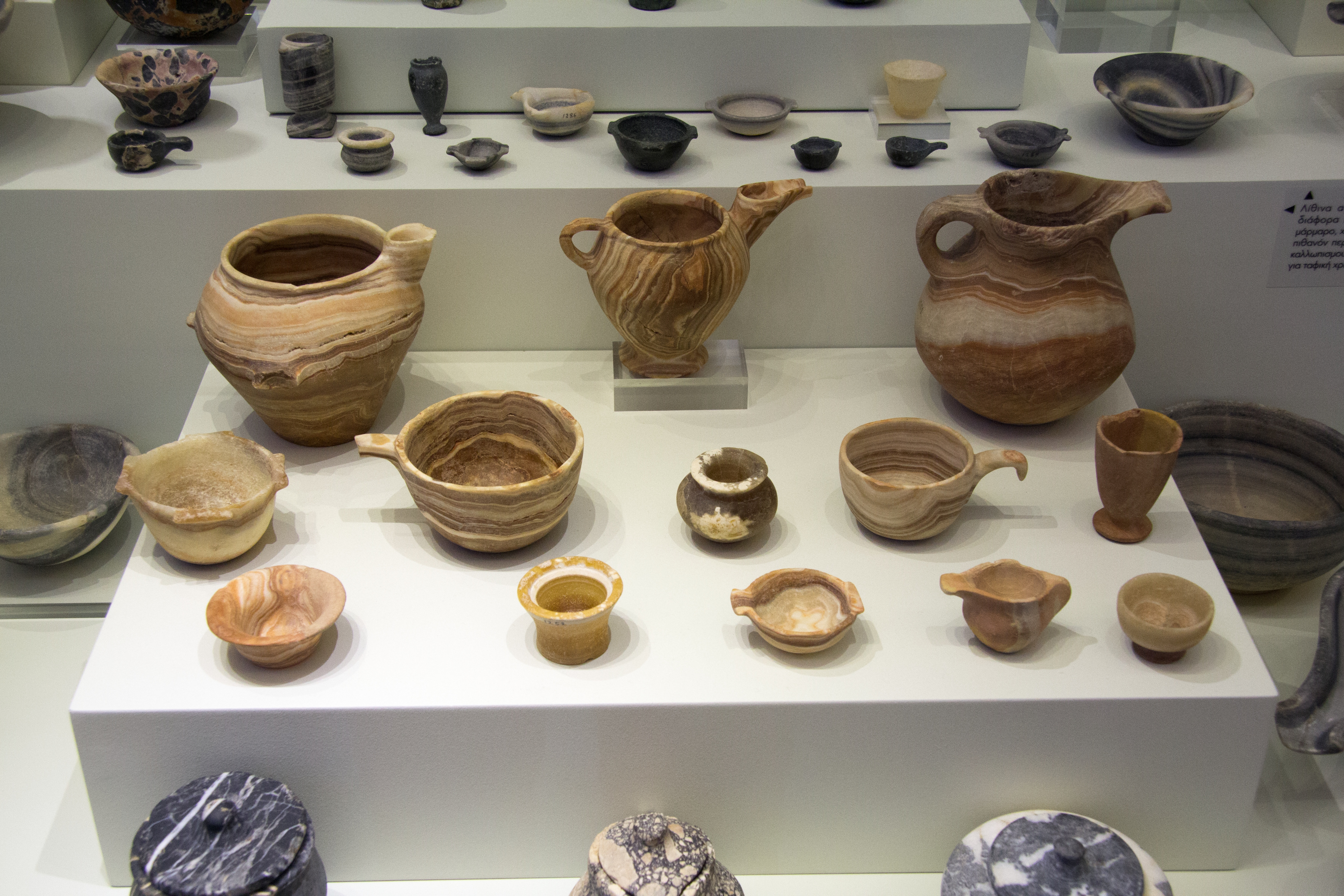
Examples of ancient Minoan pottery and vases used for libations.

== Other findings ==
During the excavation, 2,500 ceramic fragments were discovered in the sanctuary. These fragments included tripods, blades, bowls, weaving weights, and other offerings. The excavators found jugs, cups, bridge-spouted jars, and vessels which showed that libations occurred on the upper terrace. Large dishes and bowls demonstrated that food offerings also occurred.
