= Richard Tomlinson (academic) =

British archaeologist (born 1932)

Professor Richard Tomlinson FSA
- Born: Richard Allan Tomlinson; 25 April 1932 (age 94)
- Died: April 6, 2026 (aged 93)
- Education: King Edward's School, Birmingham
- Alma mater: St John's College, Cambridge
- Occupation: Academic
- Years active: 1957–present
- Spouse: Heather Margaret Murphy (m. 1957; died 2009)
- Children: four
- Awards: Fellow of the Society of Antiquaries of London (FSA)

Richard Allan Tomlinson FSA (born 25 April 1932), published under R. A. Tomlinson, was a British archaeologist. He was Professor of Ancient History and Archaeology at the University of Birmingham from 1971 to 1995, and then director of the British School at Athens from 1995 to 1996.

== Early life ==
Tomlinson was born on 25 April 1932 to James Edward Tomlinson and Dorothea Mary Tomlinson (née Grellier). He was educated at King Edward's School, a private day school for boys in Birmingham. He then studied at St John's College, Cambridge. He graduated Bachelor of Arts (BA), which was later promoted to Master of Arts (MA).

== Academic career ==
In 1957, Tomlinson served as an assistant in the Department of Greek of the University of Edinburgh. The following year, in 1958, he joined the University of Birmingham as an Assistant Lecturer. He was promoted to Lecturer in 1961 and Senior Lecturer in 1969. He was appointed Professor of ancient history and archaeology in 1971. From 1988 to 1991, he served as Head of the School of Antiquity. Since 1995, when he left the university, he has been Professor Emeritus of the University of Birmingham.

He was Chairman of the Birmingham Branch The Victorian Society between 1975 and 1978.

From 1995 to 1996, he served as Director of the British School at Athens. Previously, between 1978 and 1991, he had edited the School's Annual. He served as Chairman of its Managing Committee between 1991 and 1995. He is current vice-president, having been appointed to that post in 2001.

== Personal life ==
In 1957, Tomlinson married Heather Margaret Murphy. Together they had four children: three sons and one daughter. His wife has predeceased him, dying in 2009.

== Honours ==
On 8 January 1970, Tomlinson was elected Fellow of the Society of Antiquaries of London (FSA).

== Works ==
- Argos and the Argolid: From the End of the Bronze Age to the Roman Occupation (Ithaca, N.Y. : Cornell University Press, 1972) ISBN 0801407133
- From marble halls to mud huts, Inaugural Lectures Series, From an Inaugural Lecture Delivered in the University of Birmingham on 14 November 1972 (Birmingham: University of Birmingham, 1973) ISBN 0704400316
- Greek sanctuaries (1976)
- Epidauros (Archaeological sites) (1983)
- Athens of Alma Tadema (1991)
- From Mycenae to Constantinople: The Evolution of the Ancient City (1992)
