= Leon Roth (scholar) =

English philosopher and historian of philosophy

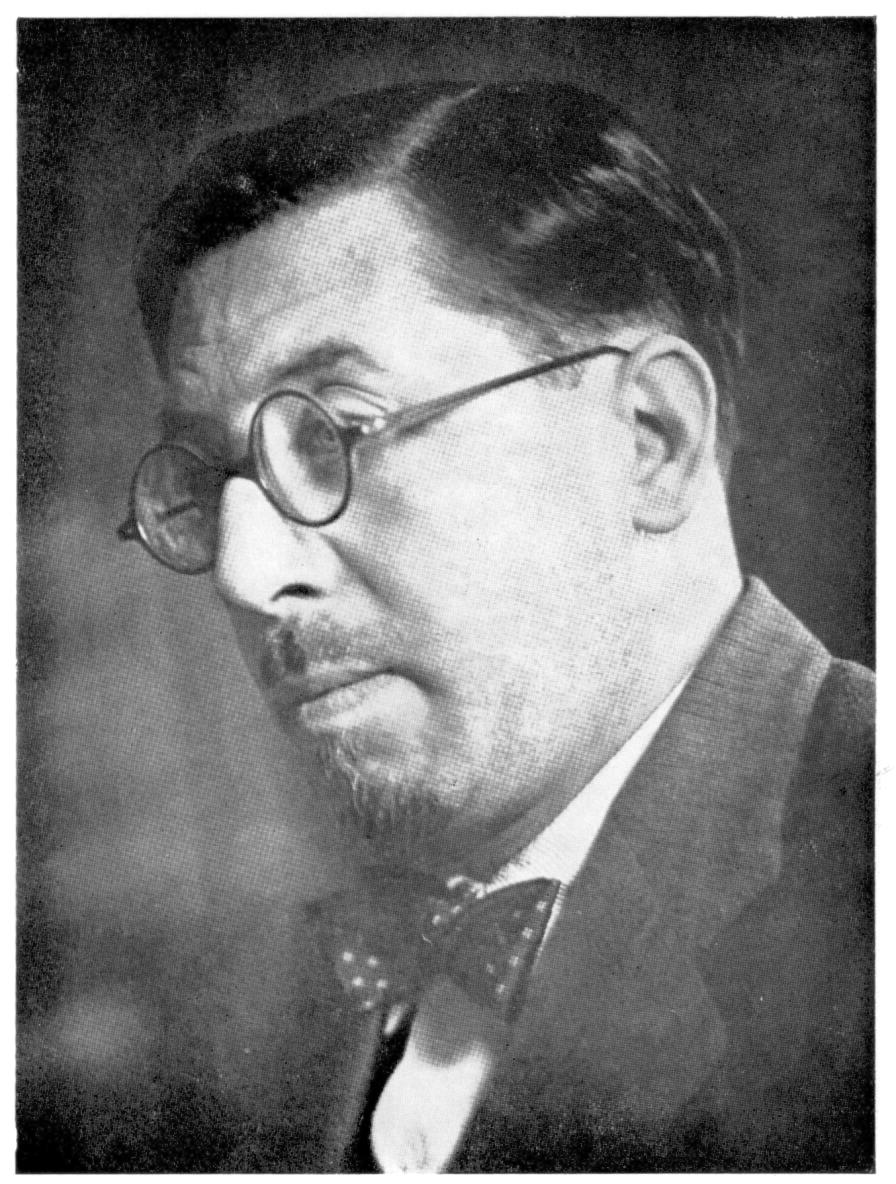
Leon Roth

Hyam Leon Roth, FBA (31 March 1896 – 1 April 1963), commonly known as Leon Roth, was an English philosopher and historian of philosophy.

== Early life and education ==
Born in London to a Jewish merchant, his brother was the academic Cecil Roth. Roth attended the City of London School and then Exeter College, Oxford, where he read classics. His university studies were interrupted by service in the First World War. Returning to Oxford, he graduated in 1920 and was awarded the John Locke Scholarship. In 1921, he received the James Mew Hebrew Scholarship. In the meantime, he completed a doctorate at the University of Oxford; his DPhil was awarded in 1922 for his thesis "A Critical Discussion of the Sources of Spinoza, with Special Reference to Maimonides and Descartes". He was only the 13th person to receive the DPhil degree from Oxford.

== Career, scholarship and recognition ==
In 1923, Roth was appointed to a lectureship in philosophy at the University of Manchester. He remained there for five years, before moving in 1928 to the Hebrew University of Jerusalem, where he took up the Ahad Ha-am Professorship of Philosophy. He also served as the university's rector from 1940 to 1943. Roth retired from his chair in 1953.

Early in his career, Roth took at interest in 17th-century rationalist philosophy and published some of Descartes's letters and a book on Spinoza, Descartes and Maimonides. Later, Roth focused increasingly on Maimonides. He also wrote more broadly on Judaism, Jewish philosophy, education and ethics. Roth was appointed an Officier d'Académie in 1926 and elected a fellow of the British Academy in 1948. He died in 1963. He was the subject of a Festschrift: Studies in Rationalism, Judaism and Universalism in Memory of Leon Roth, edited by Raphael Loewe and published by Routledge in 1966.
