= Karfi =

Human settlement

Coordinates: 35.217798°N 25.470130°E

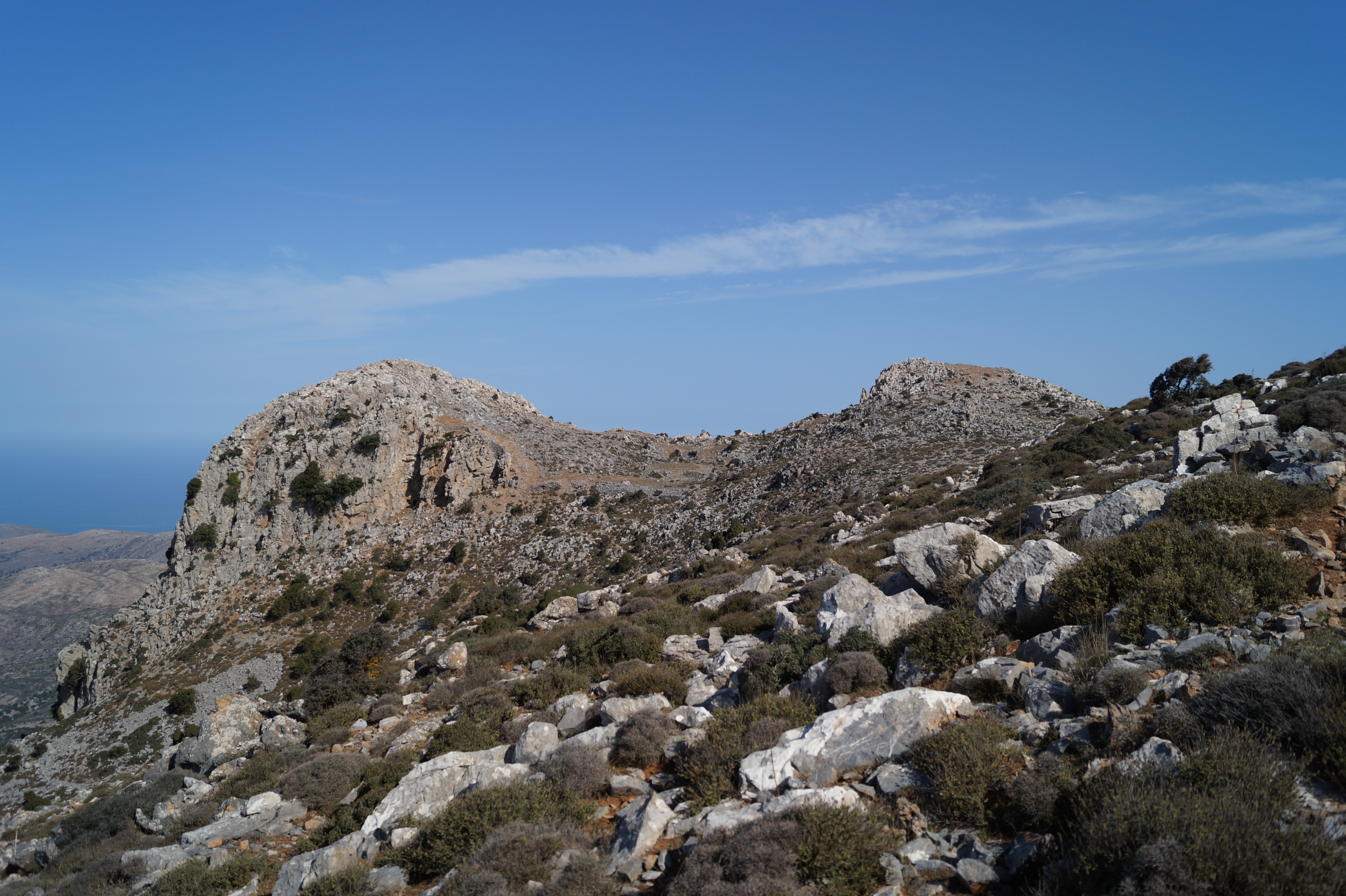
View from south on the summits Karfi (left) and Mikri Koprana (right).

Karfi (also Karphi, Greek: Καρφί) is an archaeological site high up in the Dikti Mountains in eastern Crete, Greece. The ancient name of the site is unknown; "Karfi" ("the nail") is a local toponym for the prominent knob of limestone that marks the peak of the site, especially when viewed from the north. Located approximately 1100 meters above sea level, and overlooking the northern entrance to the Lasithi Plateau, the dramatic situation of Karfi is somewhat akin to that of the famous Inca site of Machu Picchu in Peru. While there is some evidence that the site was used during the Middle Minoan period as a peak sanctuary, Karfi is best known as a large and extensively excavated town of the Late Minoan IIIC period (around 1200–1000 BCE) at the beginning of the Greek "Dark Ages."

== History of the site ==
The peak of Karfi was originally a peak sanctuary, occupying a typical site on a high shoulder (some 1.1 km (3,600 ft) above sea level) with a wide "viewshed" (Soetens, Driessen et al.) that connected it with sightlines to other sites, typical of the network developed in the "first Palace period" (Middle Minoan IB–II, 1900–1800 BCE) onwards, but probably abandoned, perhaps under increased religious centralization, in Middle Minoan IIIA (ca 1650 BCE) (Soetens, Driesen et al.). The rocky site is dominated by a bifurcated stone outcropping that is unmistakably like the carved and shaped crescent horn stone altars known in Crete and Cyprus.

When the warlike mixed group conventionally referred to as Dorians arrived on Crete from the Peloponnese after ca 1100 BCE, archaeological reconstructions suggest that they would have found the Minoan people living along with the Mycenaeans, surviving as an underclass. No doubt the Minoan language continued to be spoken by the peasants, though inscriptions, now in Linear B, were all in a form of Greek associated with a Mycenaean upper class (BBC). The Dorians seem to have driven the local people up into the hills; the latest towns with Minoan material culture are in more and more inaccessible places, one of the largest and most extensive settlements being at Karfi, high in the Dikti Mountains. At this high, remote, ancient, and sacred site a fragment of Minoan civilization survived intact for about 400 years after the occupation of Knossos. Archaeological remains include house complexes, some of which resemble the megaron-type building with central hearth, and a "Temple" or sanctuary, where votive figures were found. These clay religious figurines include the cylindrical skirted goddesses in cylindrical skirts with their hands raised in the epiphany gesture.

At Karfi the last of the Eteocretan Minoan settlements retreated to the slopes of this barren mountain, from which they had a view of the Sea of Crete, the valley of Pediada, and the plateau of Lassithi with Iraklion, where the finds from Karfi are now displayed in the Archaeological Museum (Room 11). In the mountains of Eastern Crete a non-Greek language was still being spoken and sometimes inscribed into Classical times, and the people who spoke it were still identified as "Eteocretans"— "true Cretans".

== Archaeology ==
J. D. S. Pendlebury and the British Archaeology School extensively excavated the ruins in 1937 and 1939. Some believe only one third of the site has been excavated (Swindale).

Jones declares Karphi a peak sanctuary, while other sources suggest doubt (see Swindale). Finds inventoried by Jones include ceramic loom weights, miniature vases, and the clay human and animal figurines that are ubiquitous among peak sanctuaries.

The Minoan town includes a shrine with an altar, single story houses and paved streets. Two Minoan cemeteries with tholos tombs are located near the village. The village dates from Late Minoan IIIc, and if the site does indeed include a peak sanctuary, it was of the Middle Minoan period.

== See also ==
- Greek Dark Ages
- Kavousi Vronda
- Lasithi
- Lasithi Plateau
- Minoan chronology
- Minoan civilization

== Bibliography ==
- Cadogan, Gerald. 1992. “Karphi.” In The Aerial Atlas of Ancient Crete, edited by J. Wilson Myers, Eleanor Emlen Myers, and Gerald Cadogan, pp. 116–119. Los Angeles, CA: University of California Press, 1992.
- Jones, Donald W. 1999. Peak Sanctuaries and Sacred Caves in Minoan Crete. ISBN 9170811539
- Swindale, Ian http://www.minoancrete.com/karphi.htm Retrieved 13 Jan 2006.
- BBC: The Minoan Civilization: cultural overview to put Karfi in context
- Archaeological Atlas of the Aegean: 589. Karfi
- S. Soetens, J. Driessen, A. Sarris, S. Topouzi, "The Minoan peak sanctuary landscape through a GIS approach" at XIV Congrès de l'Union International des Sciences Perhistoriquews et Protohistorique, Liège 2001 (pdf file)
- Photos from a hiker's point of view, omitting the outcrops.
- Iraklion Archaeological Museum: Room 11, ceramics from Karfi
