= Mikri Vigla =

Village on the island of Naxos, Greece

Mikri Vigla (Greek: Μικρή Βίγλα, "little lookout") is a small village on the Greek island of Naxos famed for its nearby beaches. It is located about 18 km (11 mi) south of the city of Naxos.

Its popular nearby beaches include Parthena, located to the north and 600 meters (1800 ft) long, and Limanaki, to the west that goes on for 3200 meters (10,500 ft) till Kastraki village.
