= List of archaeological sites of Greece (Lasithi) =

This list is of the declared archaeological sites of Greece located within the regional unit of Lasithi, region of Crete.

== Archaeological sites ==
Site	Municipality	Municipal Unit	Community	Image	Coordinates	Type	Ref.
Islet of Paximada, Sitia Νησίδα Παξιμάδα Σητείας	Sitia	Sitia	Sitia	Islet of Paximada, Sitia	35°22′38″N 26°10′25″E	Minoan	167245
Roman Fish Tanks of Sitia, Lasithi Ρωμαϊκές ιχθυοδεξαμενές Σητείας, Λασίθι	Sitia	Sitia	Sitia		35°12′36″N 26°06′30″E	Roman	165847
Minoan Cemetery, Hagia Photia, Sitia, Lasithi Μινωικό νεκροταφείο, Αγία Φωτιά, Σητεία, Λασίθι	Sitia	Sitia	Sitia	Minoan Cemetery, Hagia Photia, Sitia, Lasithi	35°11′45″N 26°08′52″E	Minoan	165209
Greater Area of the Sanctuary of Athena Samonia, Itanos Ευρύτερη περιοχή Ιερού Σαμωνίας Αθηνάς Ιτάνου	Sitia	Itanos	Palaikastro		35°18′01″N 26°18′09″E	4th century BC	166985
Vernegadi, Itanos Βερνεγάδι Ιτάνου	Sitia	Itanos	Palaikastro		35°17′34″N 26°17′29″E		166951
Travouni, Itanos Τραβούνι Ιτάνου	Sitia	Itanos	Palaikastro		35°16′32″N 26°16′25″E		167103
Itanus, Lasithi Ίτανος Λασιθίου	Sitia	Itanos	Palaikastro	Itanos, Lasithi	35°15′49″N 26°15′29″E		167727
Erimoupolis Bay, Itanos, Lasithi (underwater area) Όρμος Ερημούπολης Ιτάνου, Λασίθι, Ενάλιος χώρος	Sitia	Itanos	Palaikastro		35°15′46″N 26°16′03″E	underwater	167119
Vai, Itanos Βάι Ιτάνου	Sitia	Itanos	Palaikastro	Vai, Itanos	35°15′01″N 26°15′08″E	Late Minoan IA	166987
Kalamaki, Itanos Καλαμάκι Ιτάνου	Sitia	Itanos	Palaikastro		35°14′38″N 26°14′29″E	Minoan	166992
Toplou Monastery, Toplou, Lasithi Μονή Τοπλού, Τοπλού, Λασίθι	Sitia	Itanos	Palaikastro	Toplou Monastery, Toplou, Lasithi	35°13′17″N 26°12′58″E	Ottoman	167171
Kouremenos, Palaikastro, Lasithi Κουρεμένος, Παλαίκαστρο, Λασίθι	Sitia	Itanos	Palaikastro		35°12′39″N 26°16′02″E		165764
Palaikastro, Lasithi Παλαίκαστρο, Λασίθι	Sitia	Itanos	Palaikastro	Palaikastro, Lasithi	35°12′07″N 26°16′31″E		174169
Sanctuary of Diktaian Zeus, Roussolakkos, Palaikastro, Lasithi Ναός Δικταίου Διός, Ρουσόλακος Παλαικάστρου, Λασίθι	Sitia	Itanos	Palaikastro	Sanctuary of Diktaian Zeus, Roussolakkos, Palaikastro, Lasithi	35°11′43″N 26°16′31″E		165762
Grandes Islet, Palaikastro Νησίδα Γράντες Παλαικάστρου	Sitia	Itanos	Palaikastro		35°12′23″N 26°17′53″E	Minoan	165765
Palaikastro Bay and Grandes Islands, Sitia (underwater area) Όρμος Παλαικάστρου και νησιά Γράντες Σητείας, Ενάλιος χώρος	Sitia	Itanos	Palaikastro		35°11′55″N 26°17′48″E	underwater (Hellenistic+)	167240
Petsofas, Palaikastro, Lasithi Πετσοφάς Παλαικάστρου, Λασίθι	Sitia	Itanos	Palaikastro	Petsofas, Palaikastro, Lasithi	35°11′13″N 26°16′44″E	Minoan	165763
Archaeological Site between Zone B1 of Palaikastro and the Location of Skaria, Itanos Αρχαιολογικός χώρος μεταξύ Ζώνης Β1 Παλαικάστρου και θέσης Σκαριά Ιτάνου	Sitia	Itanos	Palaikastro		35°11′14″N 26°18′01″E		168087
Skaria, Palaikastro Σκαριά Παλαιοκάστρου	Sitia	Itanos	Palaikastro		35°11′14″N 26°18′14″E		166949
Agios Nikolaos, Mitato, Sitia, Lasithi Άγιος Νικόλαος, Μητάτο Σητείας, Λασίθι	Sitia	Itanos	Palaikastro		35°10′58″N 26°13′46″E	Classical	165767
Modi, Itanos Μόδι Ιτάνου	Sitia	Itanos	Palaikastro		35°10′58″N 26°12′21″E	Minoan	166982
Zakros, Lasithi Ζάκρος, Λασίθι	Sitia	Itanos	Zakros	Zakros, Lasithi	35°05′52″N 26°15′41″E	Minoan	167254
Ravine of the Dead, Zakros, Lasithi Φαράγγι των νεκρών, Ζάκρος, Λασίθι	Sitia	Itanos	Zakros		35°06′01″N 26°14′45″E	Minoan	167723
Bay of Kato Zakro (underwater area) Όρμος Κάτω Ζάκρου, Ενάλιος χώρος	Sitia	Itanos	Zakros		35°05′46″N 26°15′57″E	underwater	167602
Ambelos, Itanos Άμπελος Ιτάνου	Sitia	Itanos	Zakros		35°05′09″N 26°15′10″E	Minoan	166954

== See also ==
- Cultural heritage of Greece
- Greek Archaeological Service
