= Grandes (islands) =

Group of islands in Greece

Native name: Γκράντες
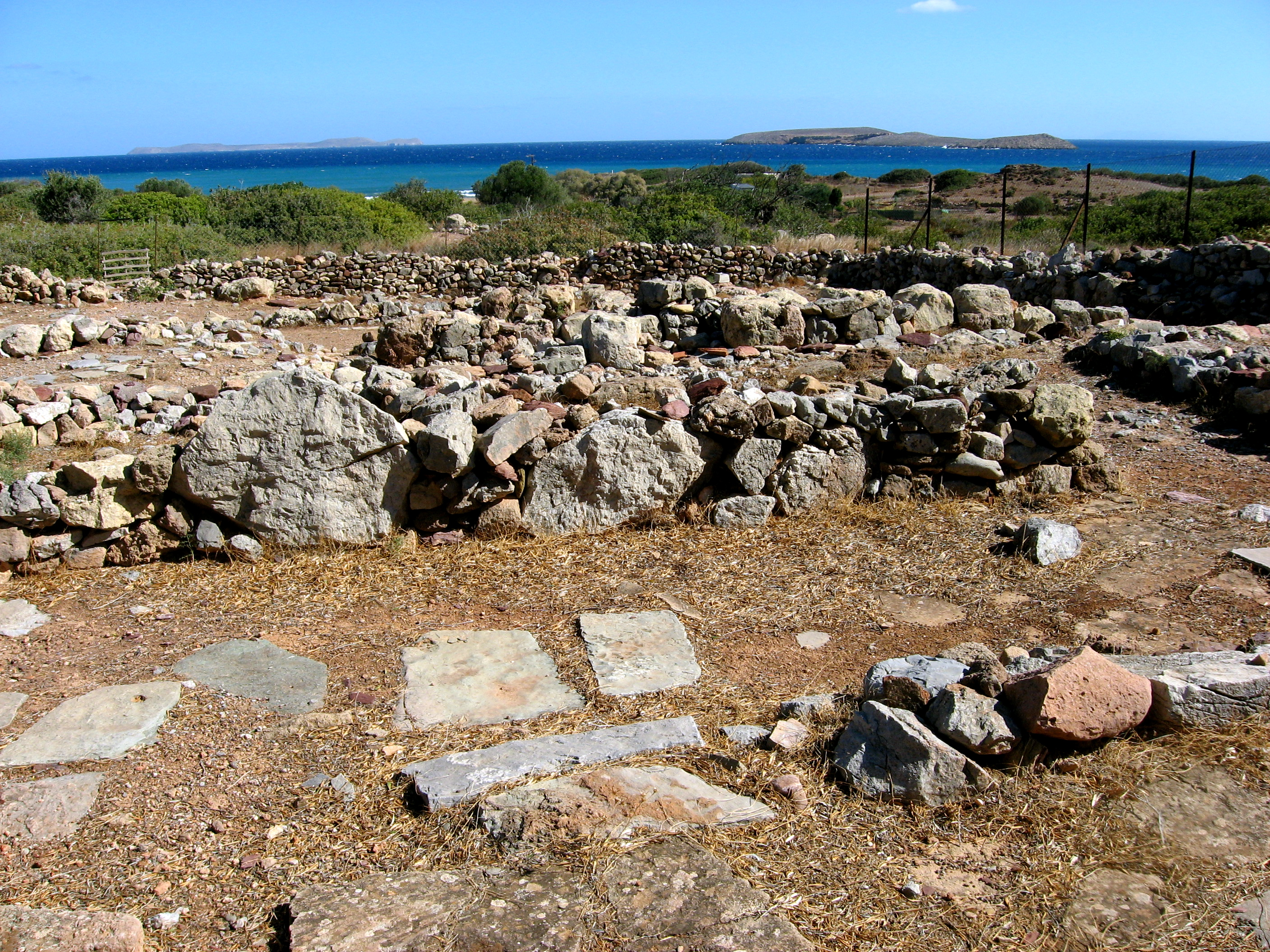
- Minoan site of Roussolakkos near Paleokastro. The islands of Elasa (left) and Grandes (right) in the distance.

- Location within Greece

Geography
- Coordinates: 35.206°N 26.298°E
- Archipelago: Cretan Islands
- Total islands: 3
- Area: 0.302 km^{2} (0.117 sq mi)

Administration
- Greece
- Region: Crete
- Regional unit: Lasithi

Grandes (Greek: Γκράντες) is a group of three small islands off the east coast of Crete. Administratively it comes within the Itanos municipality in Lasithi. Grandes can be seen from the Minoan site of Roussolakkos near Palekastro as can the island of Elasa.
