= Mavros Vrachos =

Native name: Μαύρος Βράχος
- Interactive map of Mavros Vrachos

Geography
- Coordinates: 35°15′38″N 26°16′08″E
- Archipelago: Cretan Islands

Administration
- Greece
- Region: Crete
- Regional unit: Lasithi

Demographics
- Population: 0 (2001)

Mavros Vrachos (Greek: Μαύρος Βράχος, "black rock"), is an uninhabited Greek islet, in the Aegean Sea, close to the eastern coast of Crete. Administratively it lies within the Itanos municipality of Lasithi.

== See also ==
- List of islands of Greece
