= Cultural heritage of Greece =

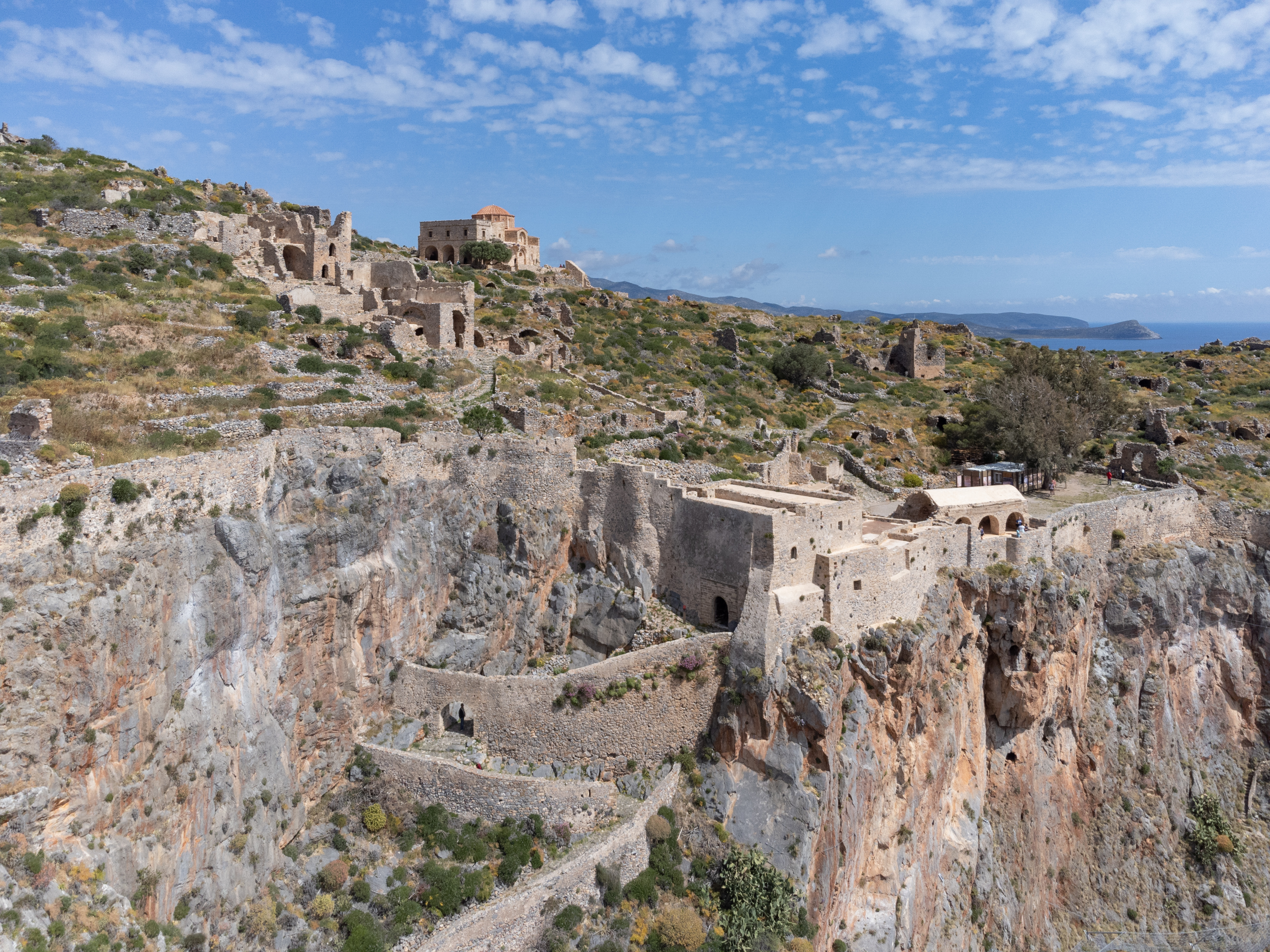
The church of Hagia Sophia (on the skyline) at Monemvasia, classed as an ancient (immovable) monument

The cultural heritage (Greek: πολιτιστική κληρονομιά) of Greece, as defined by Law 4858/2021, includes archaeological sites, historical sites, monuments both immovable and movable, and intangible cultural heritage. (Note: αρχαιολογικοί χώροι - ιστορικοί τόποι - ακίνητα μνημεία - κινητά μνημεία - άυλη πολιτιστική κληρονομιά)

== Domestic heritage system ==
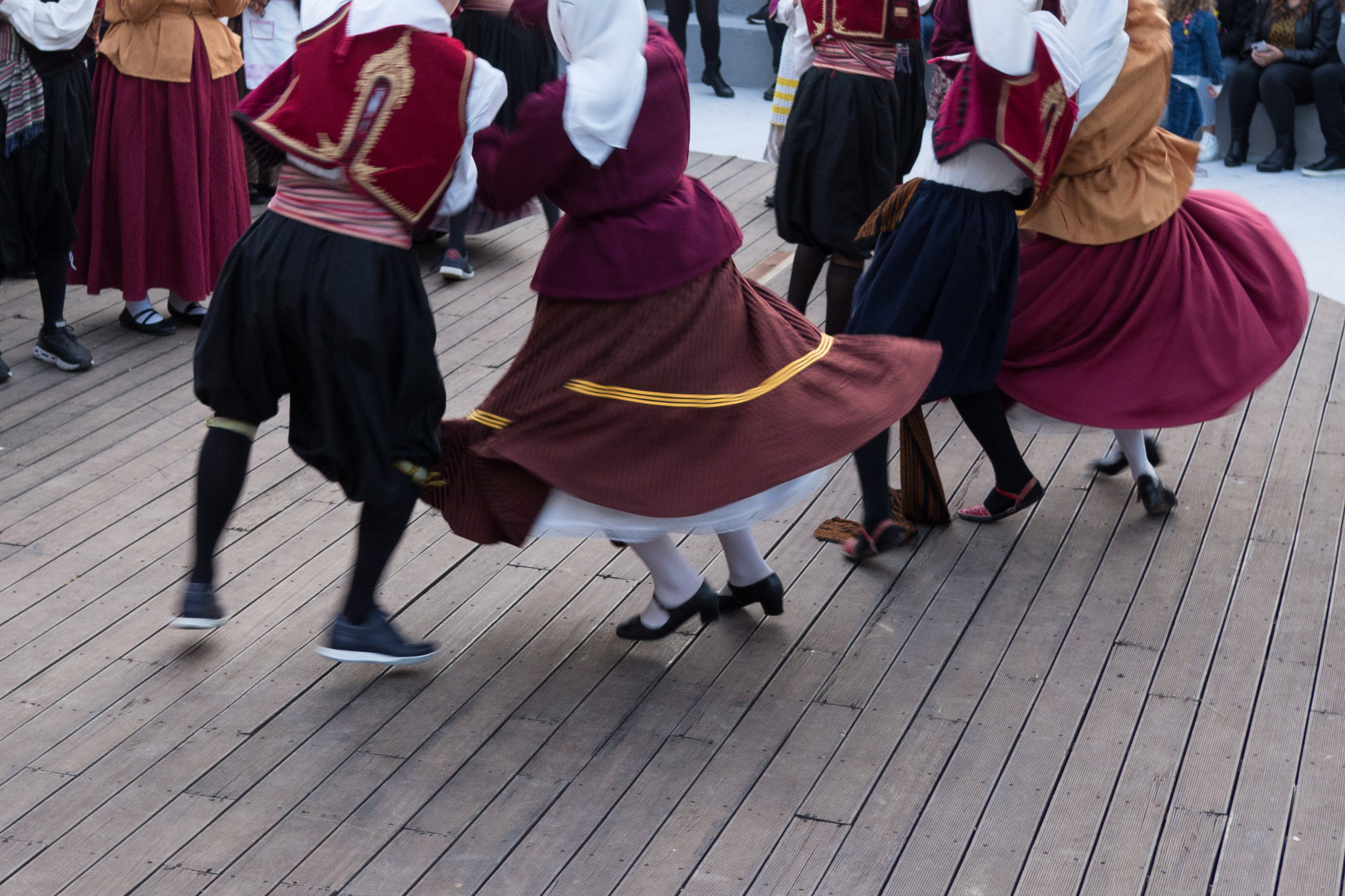
Thermiotikos balos, a dance from Kythnos, from the National Index of Intangible Cultural Heritage of Greece

=== Immovable monuments ===
As defined in Article 2 of Law 4858/2021, "Sanction of the Code of Legislation for the Protection of Antiquities and Cultural Heritage in General", immovable monuments include ancient monuments, namely those of prehistoric, ancient, Byzantine, and post-Byzantine Greece up to 1830, as well as newer monuments of particular significance. (Note: αρχαία μνημεία - νεότερα μνημεία)

=== Intangible heritage ===
In accordance with Article 12 of the UNESCO Convention for the Safeguarding of the Intangible Cultural Heritage, Greece maintains the National Index of Intangible Cultural Heritage of Greece. (Note: Εθνικό Ευρετήριο Άυλης Πολιτιστικής Κληρονομιάς της Ελλάδας)

=== National Archive of Monuments ===
Established in 2002, the National Archive of Monuments comprises three digital information systems:

- Archaeological Cadastre, for immovable monuments, archaeological sites, historical sites, and their protection zones
- Digital Collections of Movable Monuments, with items from museums and archaeological storerooms
- Historical Archive of Antiquities and Restorations

== International recognition ==
As of December 2024, Greece has nineteen World Heritage Sites, with a further thirteen sites on the Tentative List; eleven entries on the Representative List of the Intangible Cultural Heritage of Humanity; and two entries on the Memory of the World Register.

== See also ==
- List of museums in Greece
- National parks of Greece
