= Nikolaos Platon =

Greek archaeologist (1909 – 1992)

Nikolaos Platon Νικόλαος Πλάτων
- Born: 8 January 1909; Cefalonia
- Died: 28 March 1992 (aged 83); Athens
- Citizenship: Greece
- Education: University of Athens
- Scientific career
- Fields: Archaeology

Nikolaos Platon (Greek Νικόλαος Πλάτων, Anglicised Nicolas Platon; 8 January 1909 – 28 March 1992) was a Greek archaeologist. He discovered the Minoan palace of Zakros on Crete. In 1936, after excavations near Staphylos village in Skopelos Greece, he also discovered a Minoan pit tomb which proved that it belonged to king Staphylus. This finding is considered one of the most important art specimens in the Mycenaean and Minoan period.

Platon put forward one of the two relative chronologies currently used in Minoan archaeology. It is based on the development of the architectural complexes known as "palaces" at Knossos, Phaistos, Malia, and Kato Zakros, and divides the Minoan period into Prepalatial, Protopalatial, Neopalatial, and Post-palatial periods. The other system is based on pottery styles, as suggested by Arthur Evans.
