= Elaea (promontory of Crete) =

Ancient name of a promontory on the northeast coast of Cyprus

Elaea or Elaia (Greek: Ελαία) was the ancient name of a promontory on the northeast coast of Cyprus, which was mentioned by Ptolemy, (Ptol. v. 14. § 3) and is mapped by the Barrington Atlas on the southeast side of the Karpas Peninsula. A misprint in Smith's Dictionary of Greek and Roman Geography places it on Crete, but at a location, Chaule-burnau, mapped by Richard Pococke to Karpas on Cyprus. The confusion with Crete has caused the place name to be linked to a temple of Zeus Diktaios near the modern town of Palaikastron.
