= Roussolakkos =

Minoan settlement in eastern Crete

- Interactive map of Roussolakkos
- 35.19525°N 26.275426°E

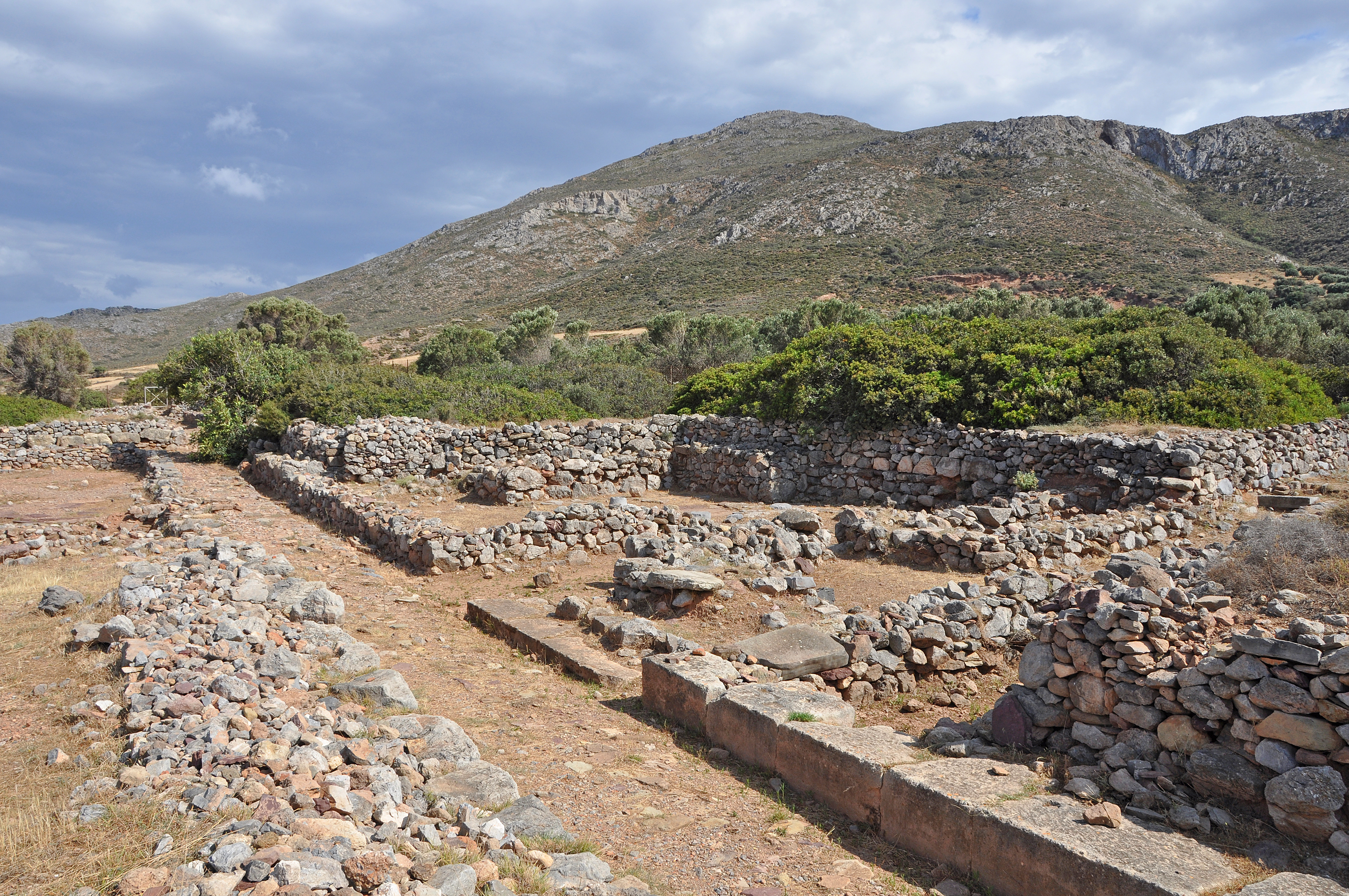
The Minoan site of Roussolakkos

Roussolakkos is the site of a Minoan city, located near Palekastro, Crete. The Bronze Age town was occupied from Early Minoan IIA to Late Minoan IIIB, and its remains are relatively well preserved. A later Greek temple to Diktaian Zeus was built at the nearby Elaea promontory.

In Greek mythology, the site was regarded as the birthplace of Diktaian Zeus. and the location where Jason and the Argonauts confronted Talos, the man of bronze, a generation before the Trojan War.

== Bronze age settlement ==
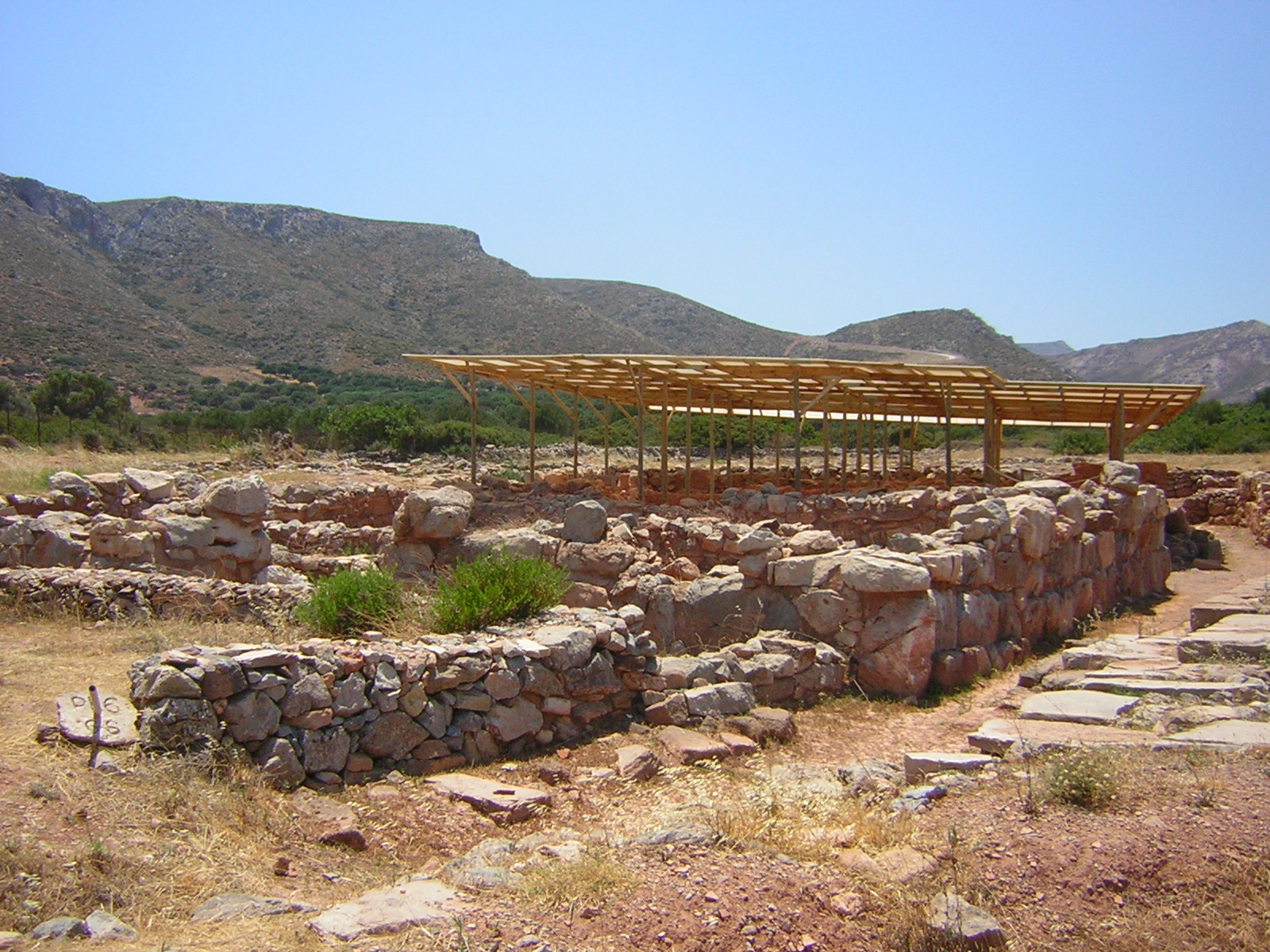
Minoan ruins at Roussolakkos

The earliest written records documenting the worship of Diktaian Zeus at Roussolakkos come from the Mycenaean Greek Linear B archives at Knossos and date to the close of the Cretan Bronze Age (c. 1300 BC), however, sacred art and architecture dating from all periods have been found, suggesting that the site was hallowed throughout its history. Among the most beautiful artifacts attesting the worship of Diktaian Zeus is a unique gold and ivory statuette of the god made c. 1500 BC. See this and more finds at the museum in Sitia.

== Archaeology ==
Roussolakkos was first excavated from 1902 to 1906 by Robert Carr Bosanquet and Richard MacGillivray Dawkins of the British School at Athens. Work was continued by L. H. Sackett and M. R. Popham in 1962–63, and is currently directed by J. A. MacGillivray, L. H. Sackett and J. M. Driessen since 1983.

Just south of Roussolakkos is Mt Petsophas, a peak sanctuary likely to have been linked with the town. Linear A inscriptions on offering tables from Petsophas are designated as PK for Palaikastro by Godart and Olivier.

The Palaikastro Kouros was found at Roussolakkos, purposefully desecrated by burning and smashing during an ancient invasion of the site. Four fragments of a stele containing the Hymn to Dictaean Zeus were also found.

== Endangered site ==
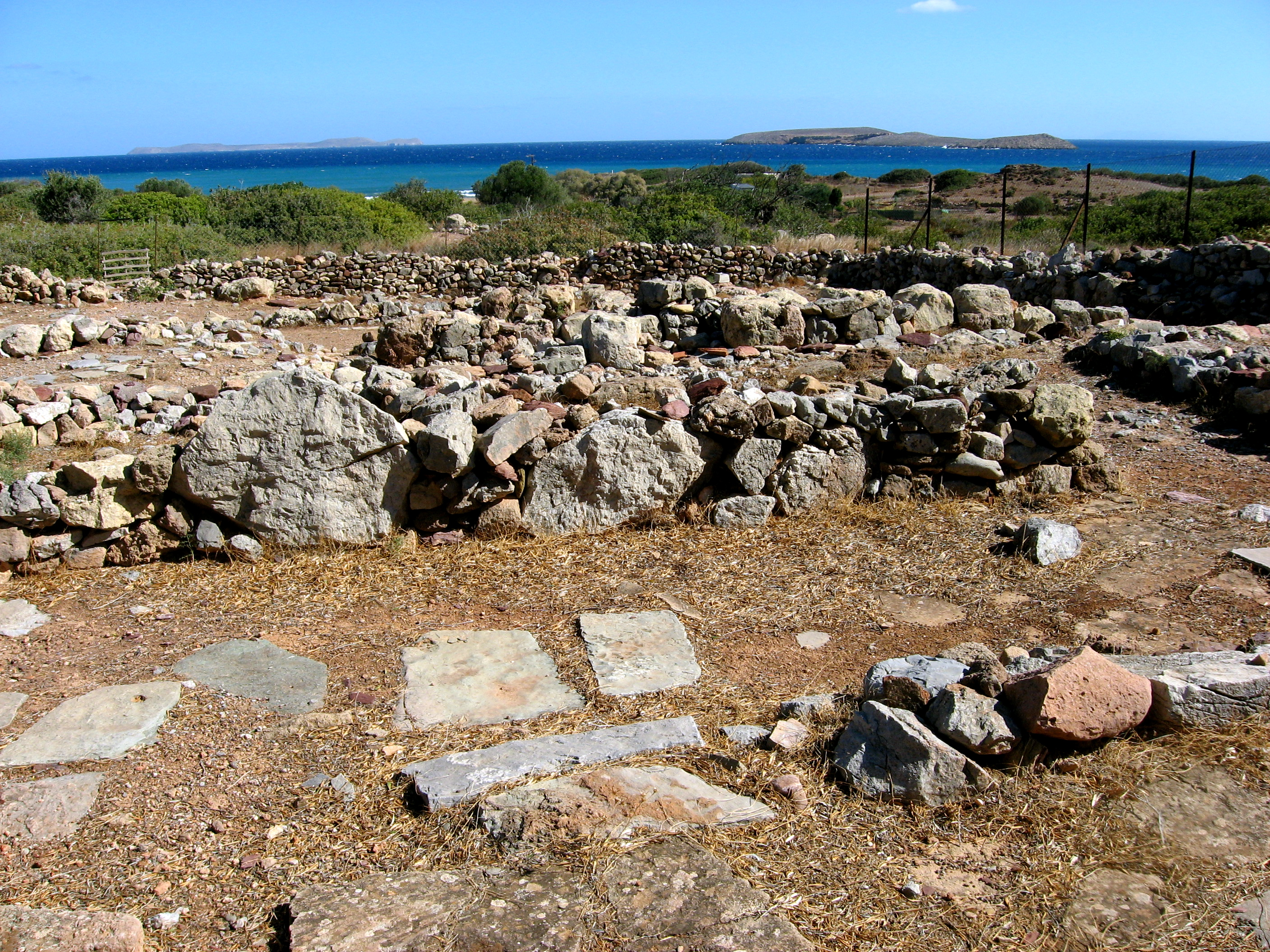
The islands of Elasa (on the left) and Grandes (on the right) can be seen in the distance, from Roussolakkos.

While the ravages of later periods and recent tourism development have obscured similar sites elsewhere in Crete, so far they have spared Roussolakkos with an area of 50,000 square metres (540,000 sq ft). Today, however, a private developer has been granted permission to build a large tourist complex at Cape Plako, an area which includes the Minoan quarries and outlying sites. An access road to reach the resort area is planned through the ancient city. In addition to development pressures, Palekastro's harbor and coastal buildings are also threatened by a rise in sea level due to local tectonic activity.
