= Itanos =

Part of Siteia, Lasithi, Crete, Greece

Itanos Ίτανος
- Municipal unit
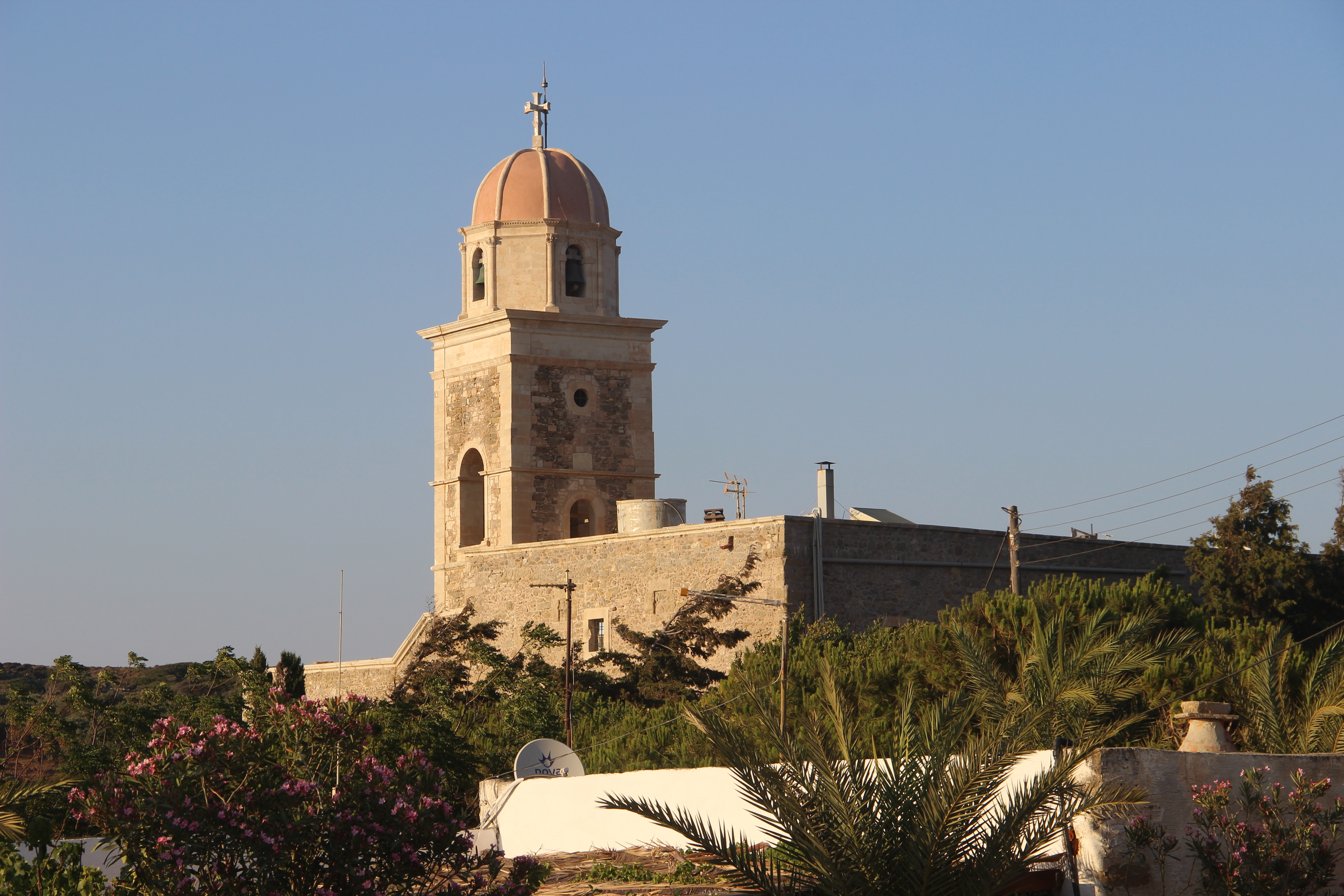
- Toplou Monastery, majority owner of the land in Itanos

- Location within the regional unit

- Location within Greece
- Coordinates: 35°12′N 26°15′E
- Country: Greece
- Administrative region: Crete
- Regional unit: Lasithi
- Municipality: Siteia

Area
  - Municipal unit: 197.4 km^{2} (76.2 sq mi)

Population (2021)
  - Municipal unit: 2,014
  - Municipal unit density: 10.20/km^{2} (26.42/sq mi)
- Time zone: UTC+2 (EET)
  - Summer (DST): UTC+3 (EEST)
- Vehicle registration: AN

Itanos (Greek: Ίτανος) is a municipal unit (demotike enoteta) of the municipality (demos) Siteia in the Lasithi regional unit, eastern Crete, Greece. A former municipality itself, it was included in Siteia as part of the 2011 local government reform. The municipal unit has an area of 197.406 km^{2} (76.219 sq mi). (Note: Itanos is now a municipal unit, but the area was not changed.) The population was 2,014 in 2021.

The seat of the municipality was in Palaikastro, but now all municipal units are administered from the municipal seat, Siteia. Until 2017 Itanos comprised four local communities (topika koinoteta): Palaikastro, Karydi, Zakros, and Mitato (Μητάτο). Subsequently by Presidential Decree No. 70/207, on recommendation of the Minister of the Interior, and approval by Sitia and Palaikastro, Mitato was abolished, due to its seriously declining population (being a few mountain communities) and its settlements were turned over to Palaikastro.

== Etymological speculations ==
Unlike most Greek demes (municipalities) Itanos did not have a modern city or town to serve as a namesake to the deme. There was a promontory named Itanos, the base of Cape Sidero, and Itanos Beach on its east side. There had been in fact an ancient city named Itanos. A Doric Greek-speaking city, at least in the classical period, the time of its inscriptions, it was founded in the 7th or 8th century BC and lasted until its abandonment in the 7th or 8th century, well before modern times. At its height its territory was approximately equal to Itanos municipal unit. Whether the promontory was named after the city or the city after the promontory is not known for certain.

It is generally agreed, however, that Itanos is not a Greek word, whatever it should turn out to be; consequently it is more likely that the peninsula already had the name. Although no Minoan city has been found under Itanos, the entire area was discovered in the Itanos Archaeological Survey to have supported Minoan sites. The nearest large Minoan center was in Palaikastro, where a Minoan city has been discovered and excavated. There is no evidence of its name. (Palaikastro is a later name.) The major speculation is that it was named Itanos, and the Greeks who settled later adopted the pre-existing name of its territory.

The modern name of the Minoan city is Roussolakkos, "red pit," named after a preceding quarry of red clay, and the ancient Greek city Itanos is now Erimoupolis. The Minoan settlement may have been called Utana (cf. Linear B U-ta-ni-yo [KN E 749]), but there are no Linear B tablets from the area and there is no evidence that this Linear B name extended as far east as Lasithi. J. Bennet ruled out the possibility that any Linear B tablets found at Knossos referred directly to classical Itanos. (Note: Bennet argues that the place names on Crete occur in lists covering localities, which he calls "routes," and that these routes occur mainly in central Crete, with some in western Crete, but none at all in eastern Crete, which he hypothesizes was not under the control of the central Cretans at Knossos. If the name is the same as the ones in the routes, and if east Crete developed independently, then the eastern Minoans must have assigned it earlier than the routes, but so far there is no evidence supporting this hypothesis. There is also a question of whether Itanos would be native Minoan or a borrowed word, and if the latter, from where.)

A beach north of Itanos Beach was named Erimoupolis as though there had been a polis. The name, however, means "deserted city. Archaeological investigation discovered a rather large ancient city sprawling over the hills next to the beaches. Scientific studies showed that Itanos Beach was a sedimented harbor. There was no longer a question of the location of Itanos.

== Reference bibliography ==
- Bennet, John (2011). "13. The Geography of the Mycenaean Kingdoms" (PDF). A companion to Linear B: Mycenaean Greek Texts and Their World. Vol. 2. Louvain-la-neuve; Walpole, MA: Peeters.
- ELSTAT (2009). "Population & housing census 2001 (incl. area and average elevation)" (PDF) (in Greek). Archived (PDF) from the original on 2015-09-21.
