= Hagia Sophia, Monemvasia =

Byzantine church in Monemvasia, Greece

Hagia Sophia
- Αγία Σοφία
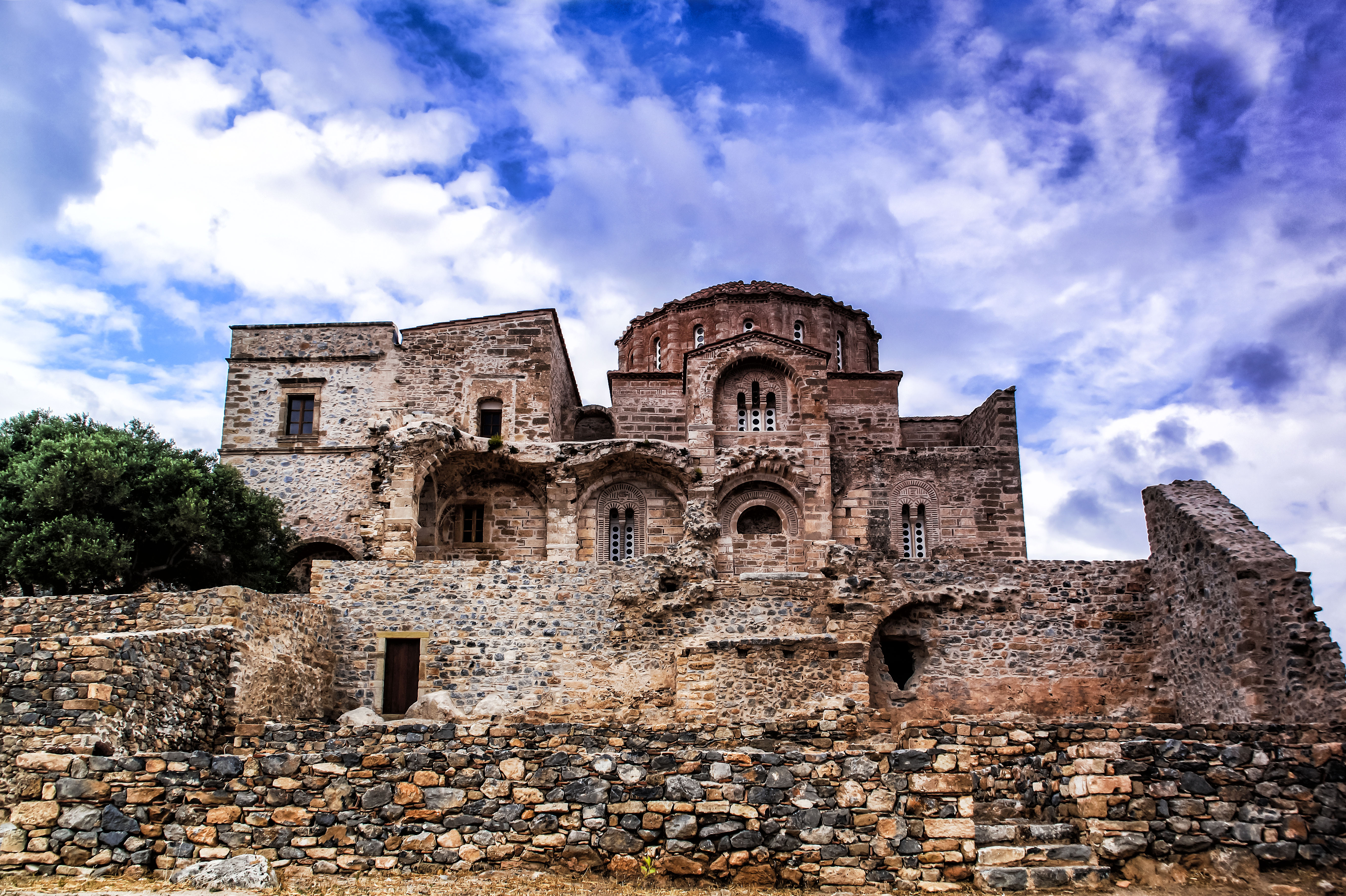

- The church
- 36°41′22.8″N 23°03′15.8″E
- Location: Monemvasia
- Country: Greece
- Denomination: Greek Orthodox

History
- Dedicated: 1150

Architecture
- Functional status: Open

Specifications
- Width: 14x14 m.
- Materials: Brick, stone, marble

Administration
- Metropolis: Monemvasia and Sparta

The Church of Hagia Sophia (Greek: Ἁγία Σοφία, romanized: Hagía Sophía, lit. 'Holy Wisdom' Ancient Greek pronunciation: [aˈʝia soˈfia]) or Holy Wisdom is a Byzantine church in the medieval town of Monemvasia, Peloponnese, southern Greece. It forms part of the wider archaeological site of Monemvasia. It was built on the upper town of Monemvasia, and was originally dedicated to Panagia Hodegetria ("Virgin Mary Who Points the Way").

It is the most important monument of Monemvasia. The Venetians, who held Monemvasia for some time, used it as a Catholic church dedicated to Madonna, while during the Ottoman period it was converted into a mosque before being finally restored to Christian worship upon Greece's independence in the early nineteenth century.

== History ==
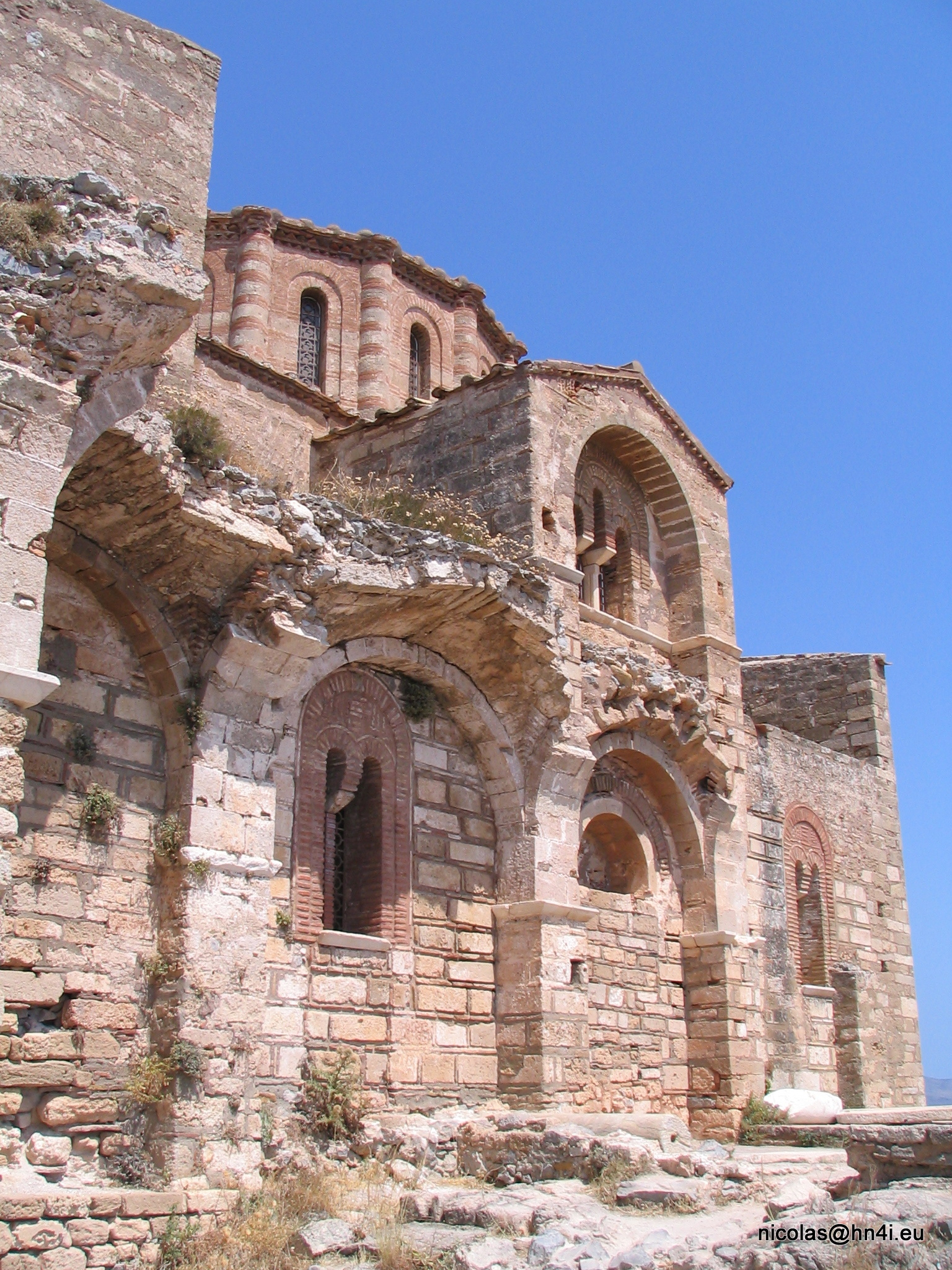
Lower angle.

=== Middle ages ===
Information of the church's history is limited due to the absence of written sources. Hagia Sophia has been greatly associated with Emperor Andronikos II Palaiologos, but it is probably much older. It is generally accepted that Hagia Sophia dates back to 1150, during a period when Monemvasia saw impressive economical growth and the settlement spread throughout the rock and not only on its invisible side, and is associated with the successful repulsion of the Normans in the year 1147. Originally, it was dedicated to the Virgin Mary the Hodegetria, but it remains unclear whether it was a Catholic monastery or a parish church.

During the years of the first Venetian rule (1463–1540) it came into the hands of Catholic Romans, while during the first period of Ottoman Turkish rule (1540–1690) it was converted into a mosque. During the second Venetian rule (1690-1715) it became a church again, a Roman Catholic one this time, the katholicon of a monastery dedicated to Madonna del Carmine. As a mosque, it was renamed to Fethiye Mosque (Turkish: Fethiye Camii, lit. 'Mosque of the Conquest'), though it was also called Sultan Suleymaniye Mosque (Turkish: Sultan Suleymaniye Camii).

=== Recent and modern period ===
In 1715 the church was once again converted into a mosque, and remained so until 1821, when Greece gained its independence; the minaret was demolished and the Greeks dedicated the church to the holy wisdom of God, hence the new and current name.

First repair works took place in 1827 and 1845, as evidenced from inscriptions. Renovation works of Hagia Sophia also took place in the year 1958, led by Eustathios Stikas, with the restoration of its old Byzantine elements, but some of the architectural elements had been modified to such an extent that they could not be used and thus were transferred to the archaeological collection. Some of them most impressive archaeological findings of Monemvasia where excavated from Hagia Sophia.

== Architecture ==
=== Structure ===
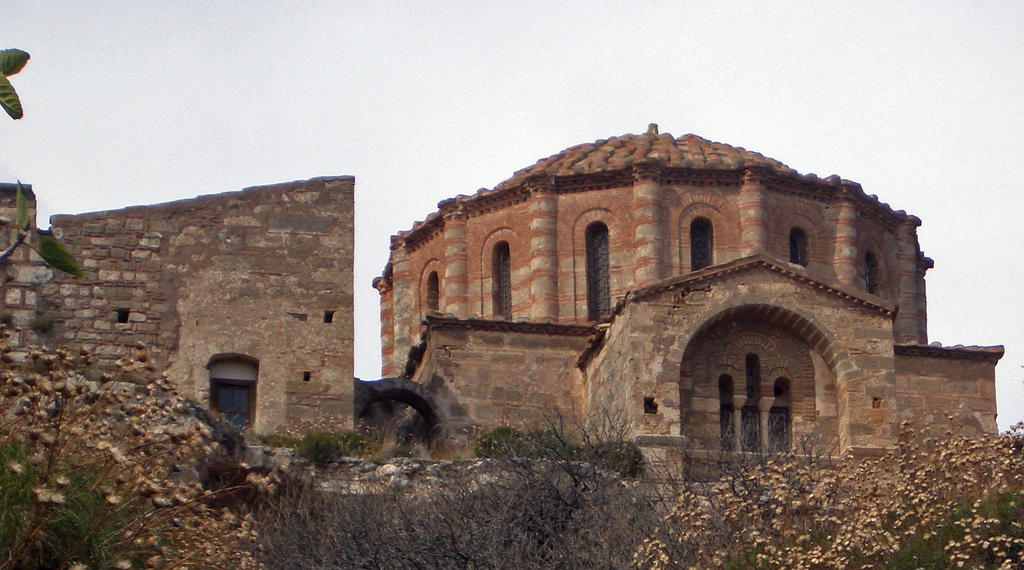
The dome

Hagia Sophia is a cross-in-square style church, topped with a dome. The main room measures 14x14 meters, while its dome is seven meters in diameter and has sixteen windows.

The church belongs to the so-called Epirotic octagonal-room with dome type, and is considered to be one of its finest examples. A characteristic of this architectural type is that the main church is a single space, as the eight pillars that support the dome are pushed to the sides. Chapels are formed in the four corners of the main church space, while on the eastern side there is a three-side chancel, and on the western side a narthex. The narthex is a two-storey type. The masonry is elaborate, built with the brick-enclosed system. Inside the church, the fragments of murals date back to the 12th century.

Following the completion of the church, a double portico was added to the south façade externally, while during the Venetian times a two-story external narthex was added along the entire length of its west façade. During the first Ottoman rule, when Hagia Sophia was turned into a mosque the frescoes were whitewashed and a minaret was erected on the southwest side. The mihrab was added on the south side.

=== Art of the church ===
The frescoes in the chancel portray scenes from the life of Saint Nicholas and are associated with the theft of the saint's relics, which were stolen by Italian merchants from Lycian Myra in 1087, who then arrived in Monemvasia's harbor while transporting them to Bari. Other surviving murals of Hagia Sophia include that of the archangels on the narthex and one of the Ancient of Days. The church also contains surviving sculptured marble decorations, an important example of 12th century sculpture.

== Gallery ==
Hagia Sophia of Monemvasia

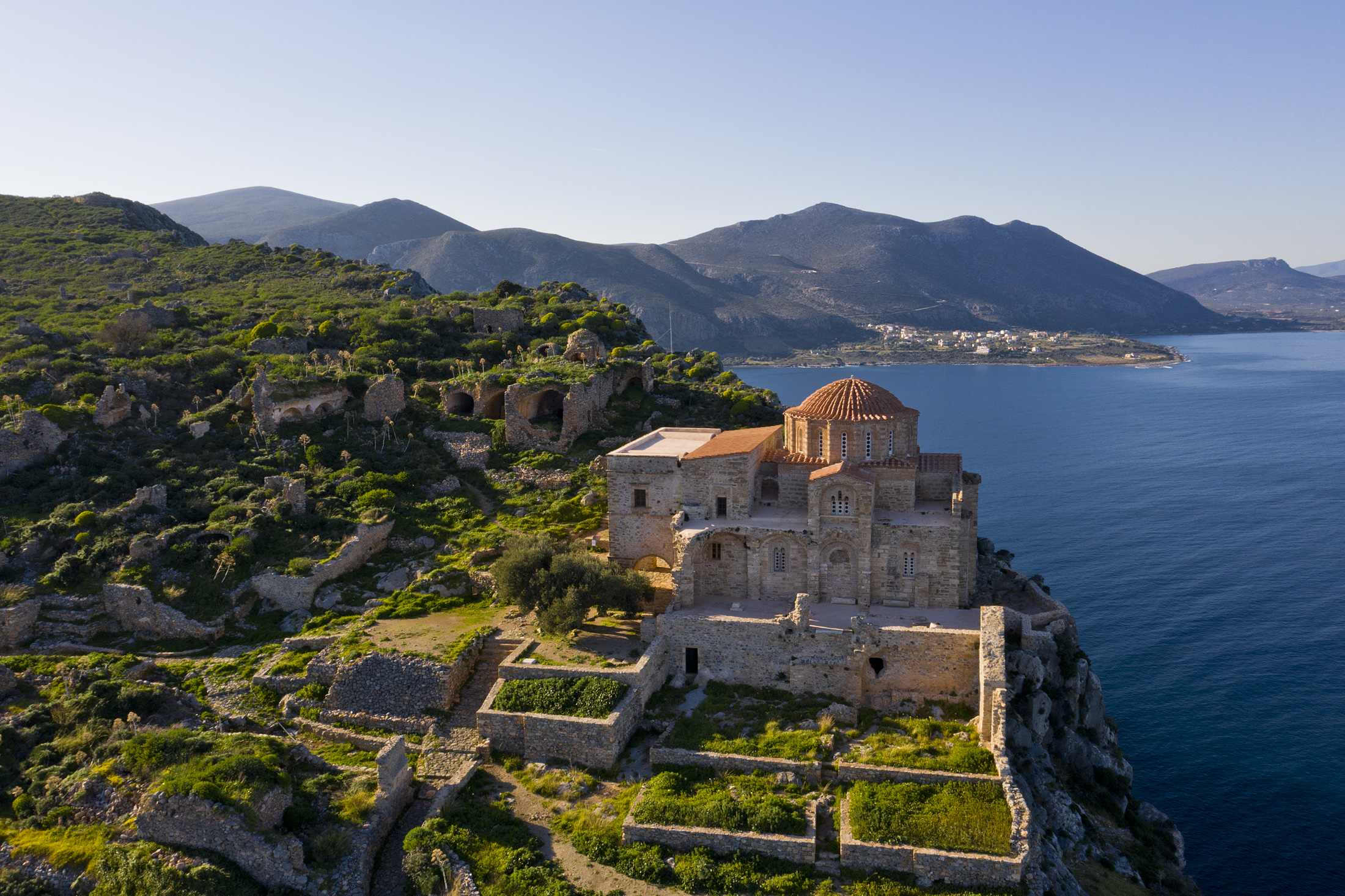
Hagia Sophia on the rock.

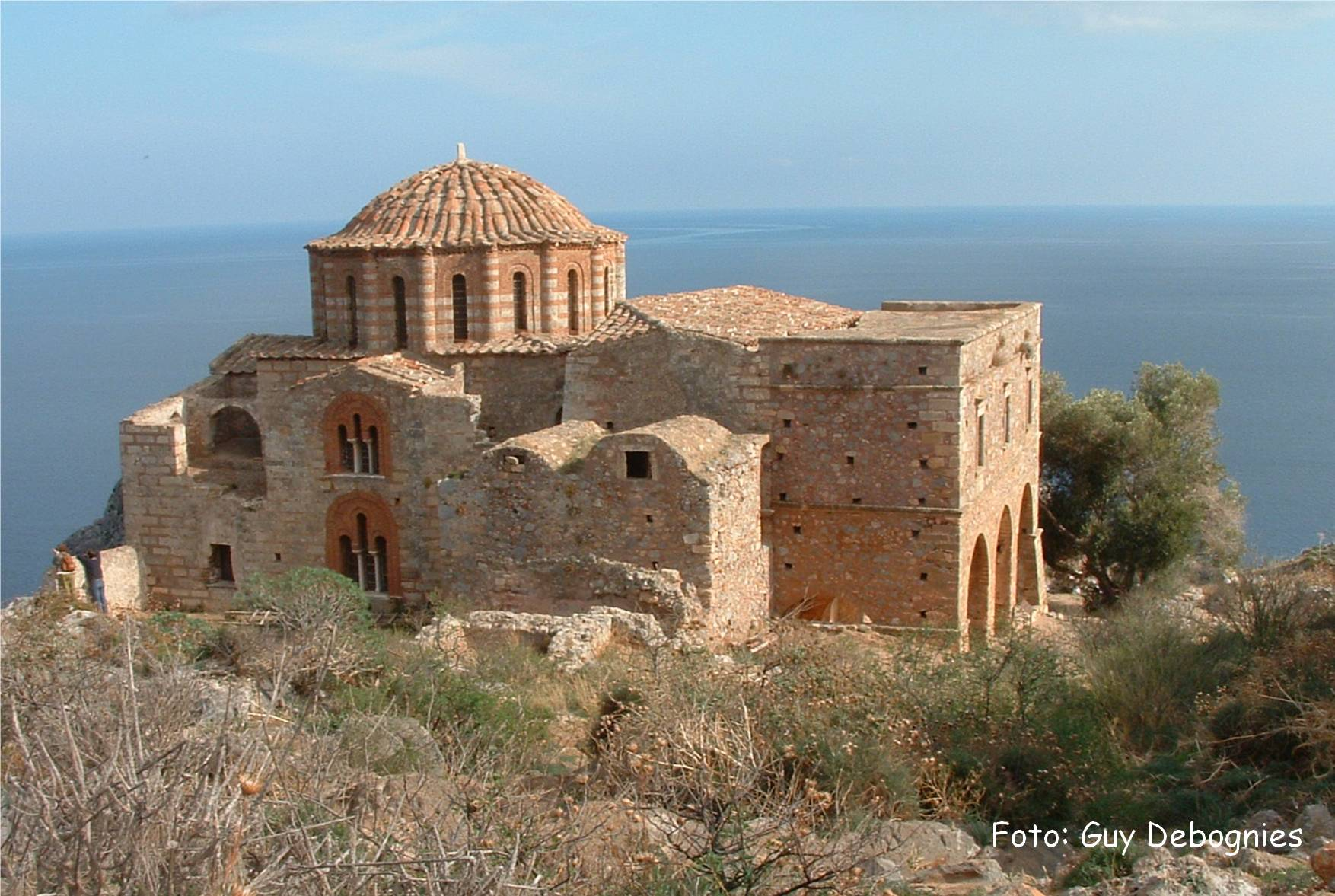
North view.

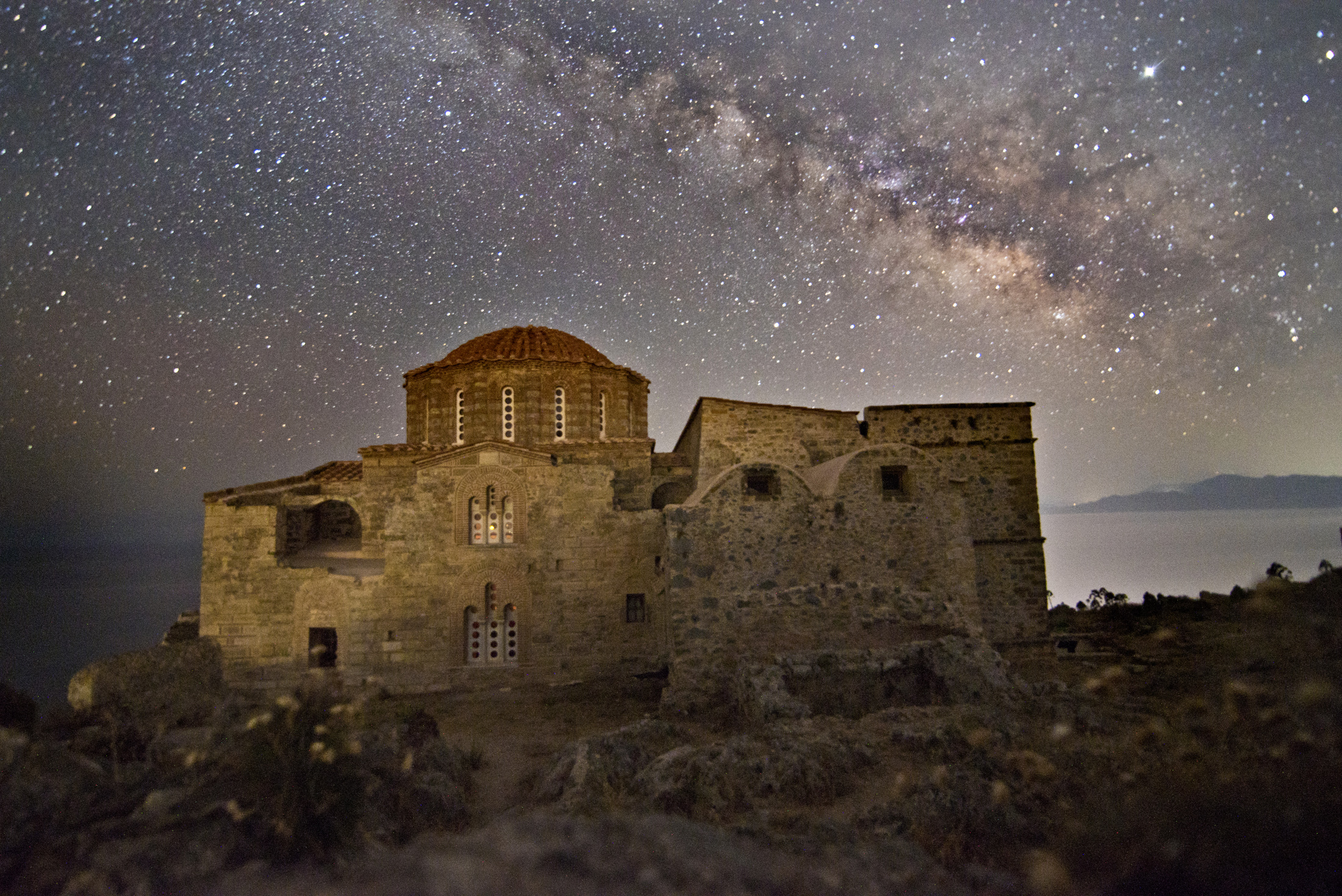
The church at night.

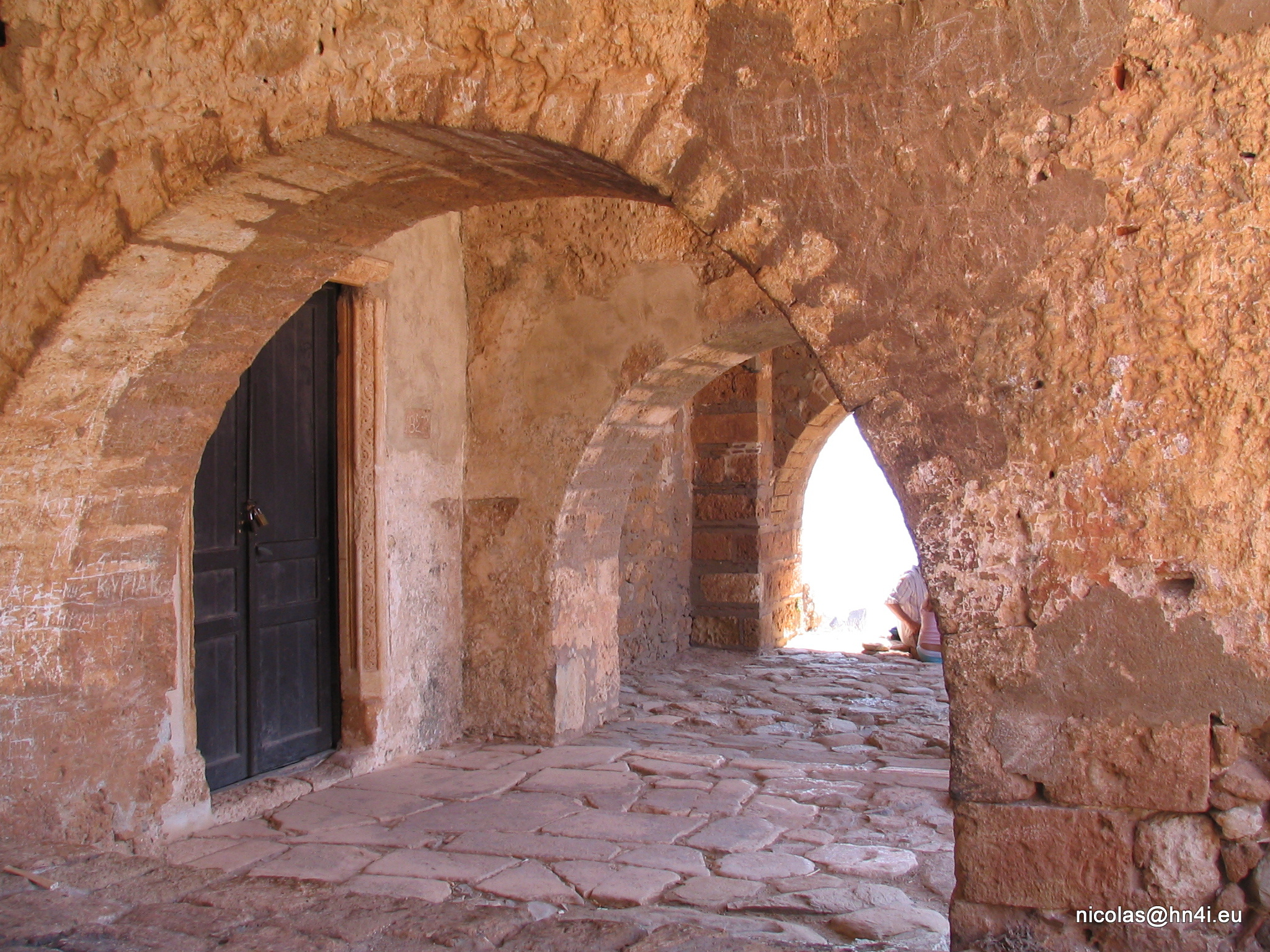
Arches.

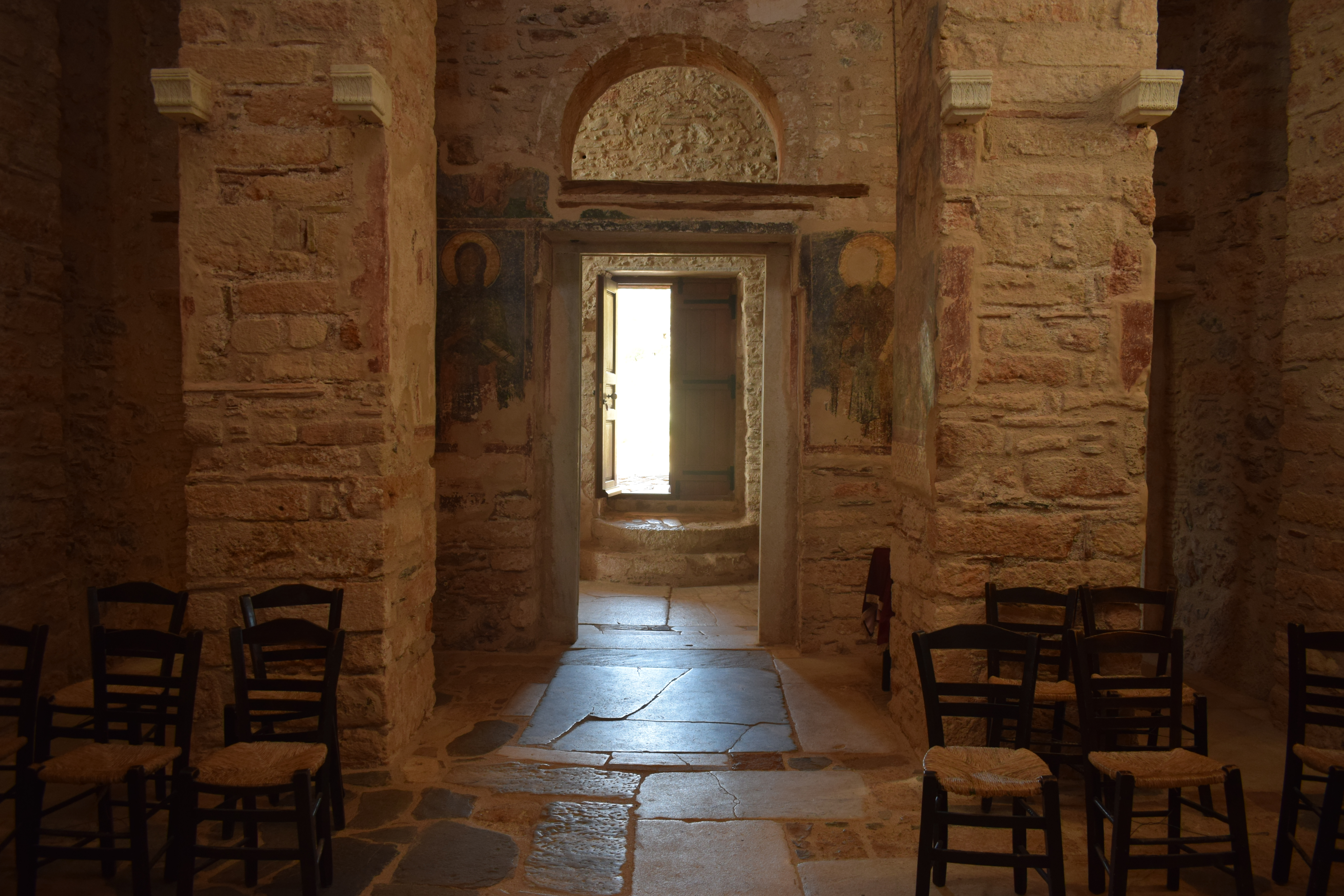
Interior of Hagia Sophia.

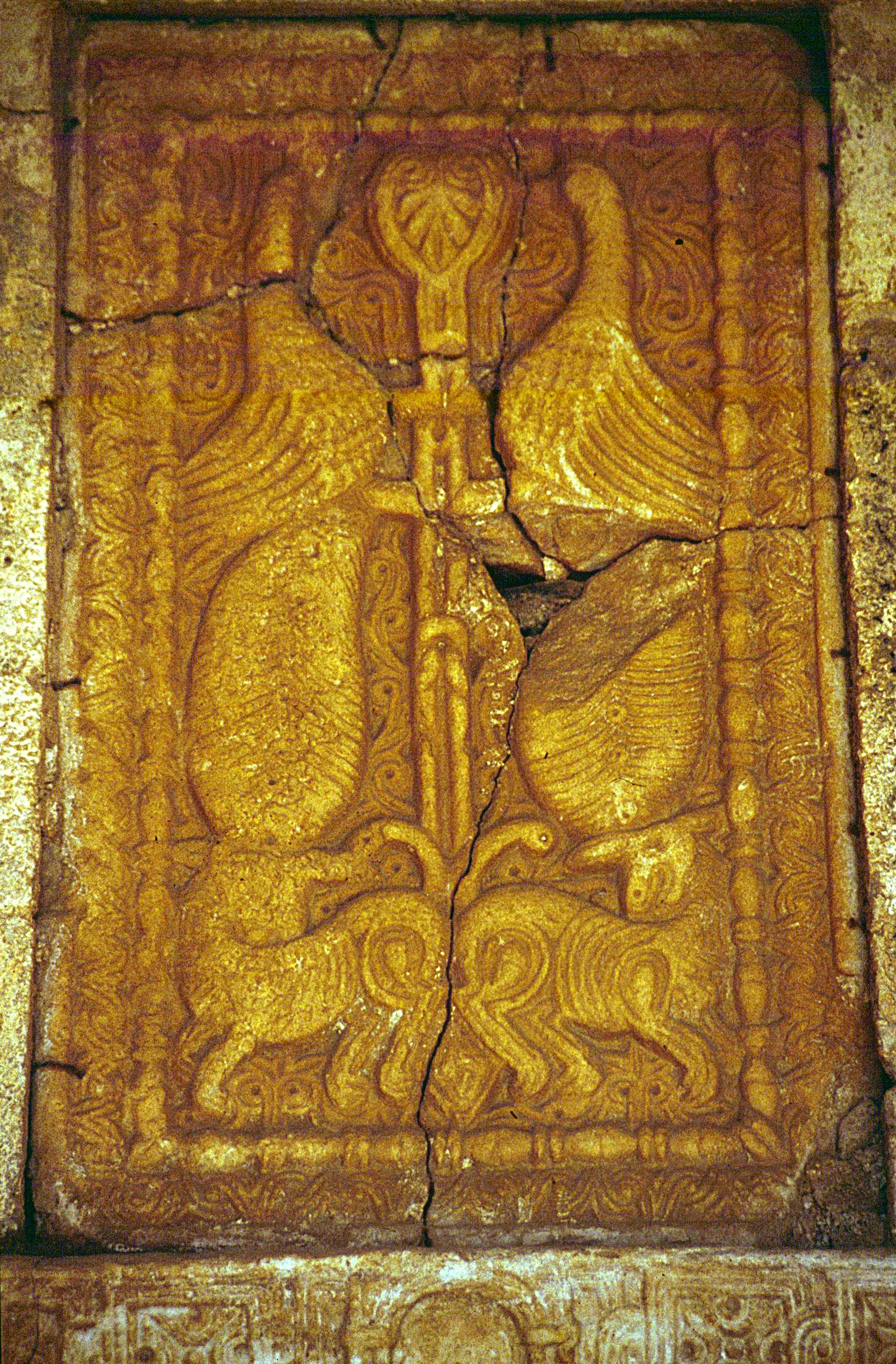
Decoration.

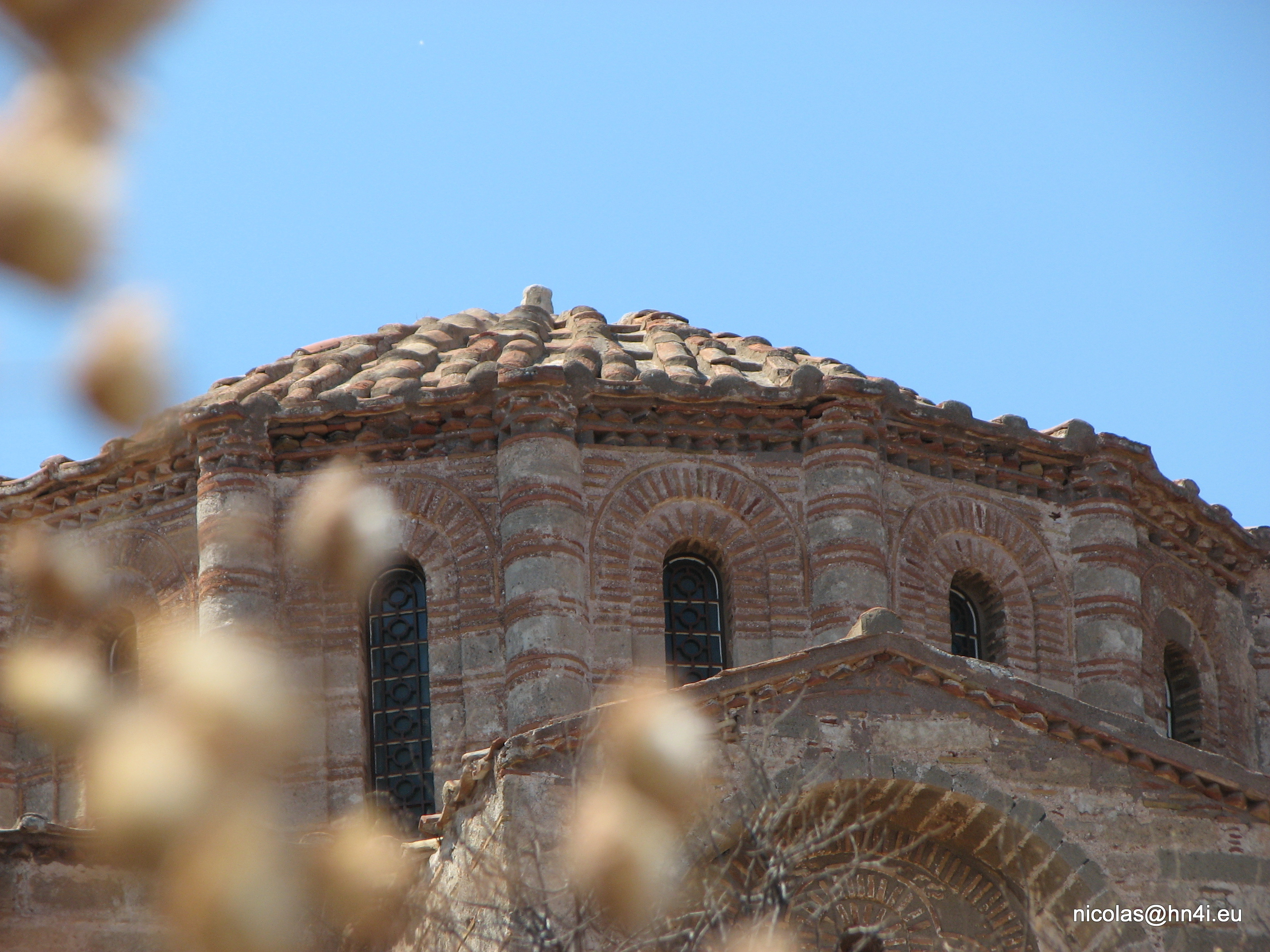
Dome.

== See also ==
- Hagia Sophia, Mystras
- Mystras
- Sumela Monastery
- Conversion of non-Islamic places of worship into mosques

== Bibliography ==
- Eugenidou, Despoina (2001). Μονεμβασιά: αντικείμενα, περιβάλλον, ιστορία, η αρχαιολογική συλλογή [Monemvasia: Items, Environment, History, the Archaeological Collection] (in Greek). Athens: Ministry of Culture, Fund for Archaeological Resources and Expropriations. ISBN 960-214-266-9.
- Kalliga, Charis A. (2010). Μονεμβασία: Μια βυζαντινή πόλις-κράτος [Monemvasia: A Byzantine city-state] (in Greek). Athens: Potamos. ISBN 978-960-6691-64-5.
