= Palaikastro =

City near the east coast of Crete, Greece

Palaikastro Παλαίκαστρο
- Community
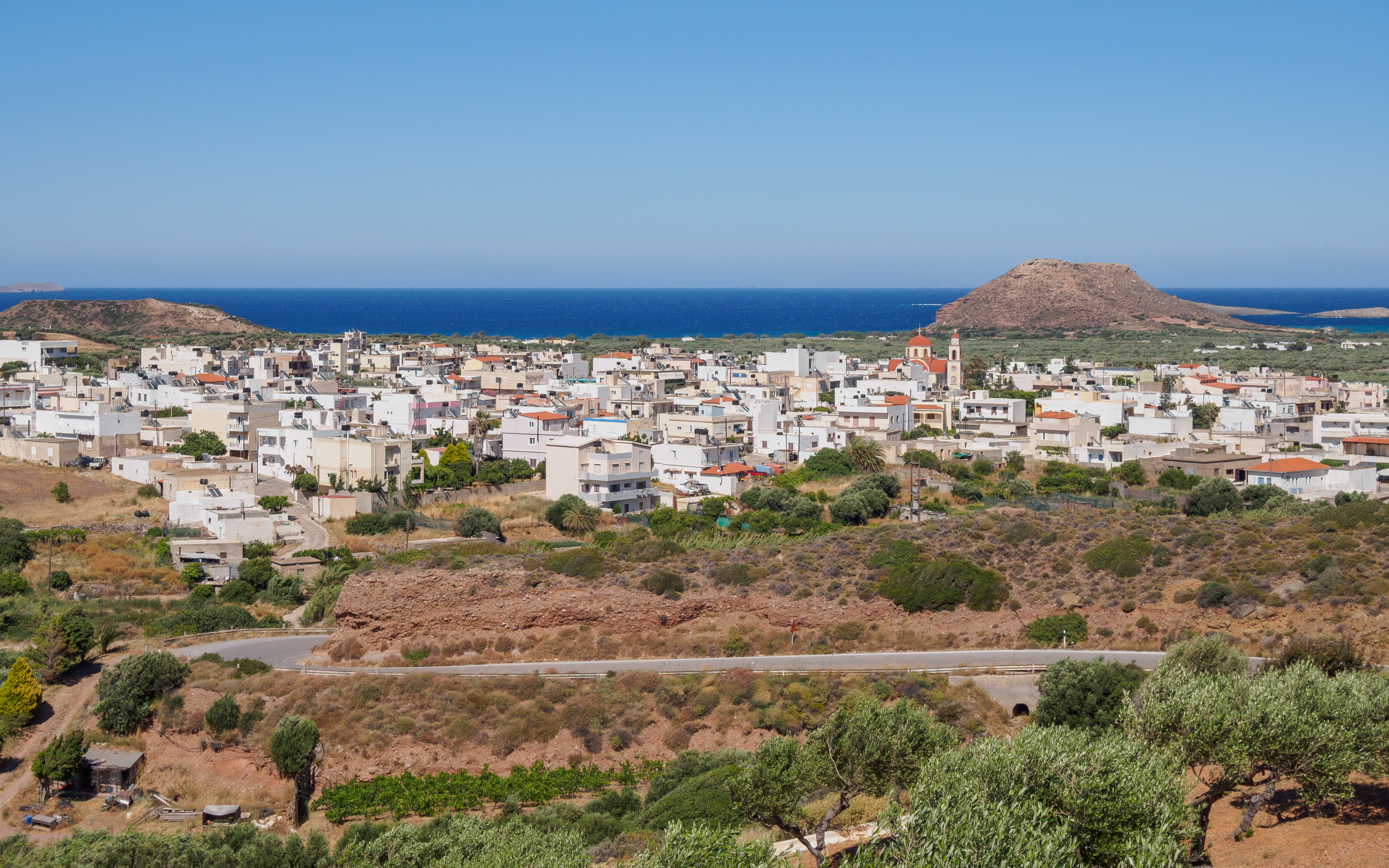
- Panorama looking ENE into the Strait of Kasos over the town from some high ground to the west.

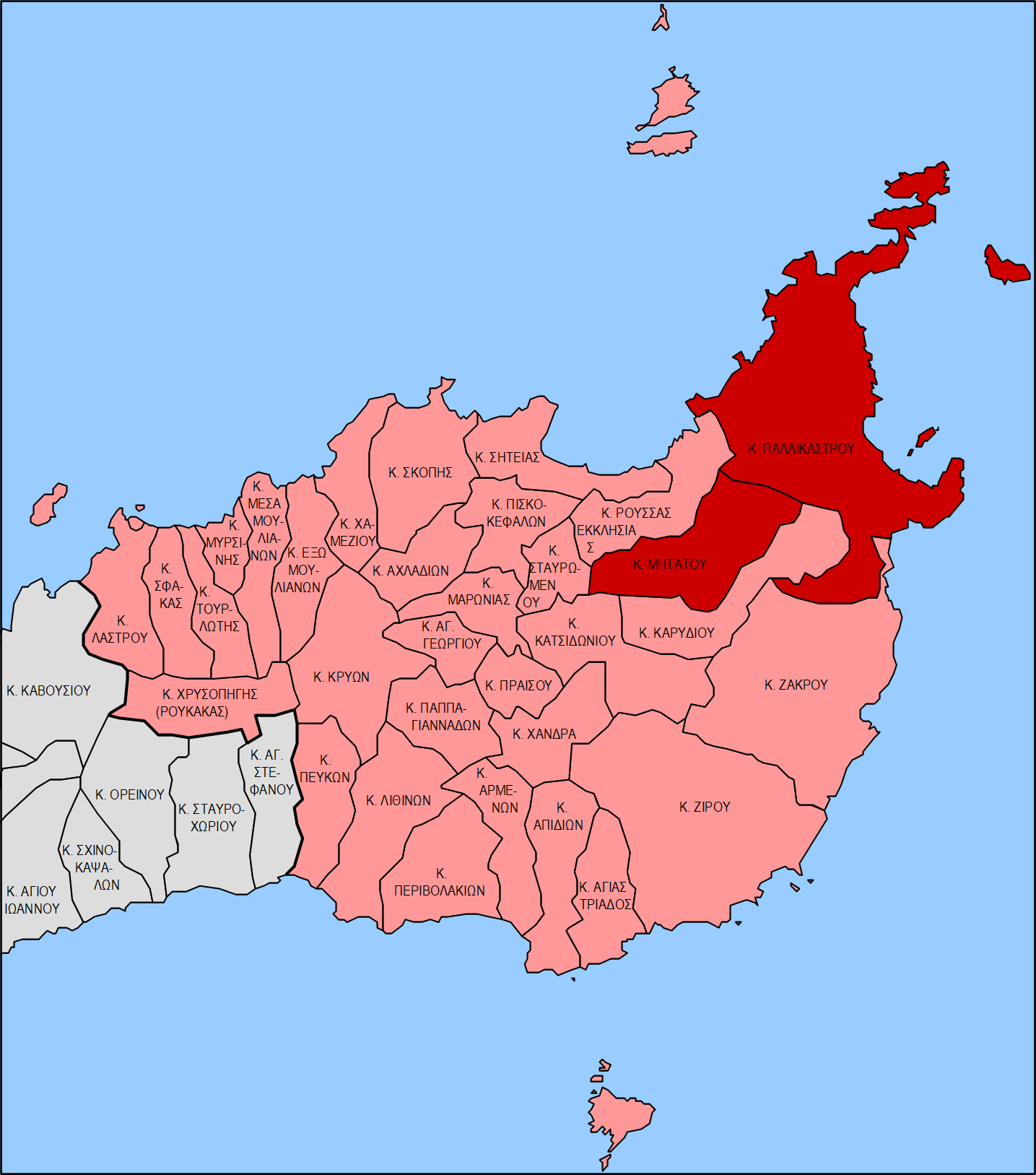
- Map of east Crete. Palaikastro is in red; Lasithi in pink and red

- Location within Greece
- Coordinates: 35°12′N 26°15′E
- Country: Greece
- Administrative region: Crete
- Regional unit: Lasithi
- Municipality: Siteia
- Municipal unit: Itanos

Population (2021)
  - Community: 1,254
- Time zone: UTC+2 (EET)
  - Summer (DST): UTC+3 (EEST)
- Website: http://www.palaikastro.com/

Palaikastro or Palekastro (Greek: Παλαίκαστρο, officially Greek: Παλαίκαστρον), with the Godart and Olivier abbreviation PK, is a thriving town, geographic heir to a long line of settlements extending back into prehistoric times, at the east end of the Mediterranean island Crete. The Kallikratis Programme implemented starting 2011 made the town into a local community (τοπική κοινότητα, topikí koinótita) under jurisdiction of the next-highest levels, chained as follows: municipal unit (demotike enoteta) Itanos, municipality (demos) Sitia, regional unit (periphereiakes enotetas) Lasithi, region (periphereia) Crete.

Until 2017 Palaikastro shared Itanos with Karydi, Zakros, and Mitato (Μητάτο). The latter was located on an altiplano to the west. It had 6 villages, including the Mitato, "mitato" meaning a local type of shieling, named after an old ruined one, that still attracts the interest of visitors. However, subsequently the population on the plain diminished to the point where Mitato village had no permanent residents. Consequently, by Presidential Decree No. 70/207, on recommendation of the Minister of the Interior, and approval by Sitia and Palaikastro, K. Mitato was phased out and its settlements were turned over to Palaikastro, which had been collecting the population, and providing the services, anyway.

== Etymology ==
At the coast of the town is a 65 m (213 ft) high precipitous promontory called Kastri (Latin castrum, "fort"), which received its name and gave it to the settlement below, Palaikastro ("old fort") in the Middle Ages, when Crete was ruled by the Republic of Venice. Flat land is totally absent from the promontory, but around the top ridge the Venetians constructed a walled and turreted fort. In the centuries after the Venetians left much of the stone was re-used by the population. Sections of battlements and houses remain.

The fort was built before the age of cannon, probably being one of the thirty four castles that had been built or rebuilt on Crete by the Genoese privateer, Arrigo da Castello between 1199 and 1218, before the Venetians arrived and fought for the Duchy of Crete (1208-1252). It had been a defensible location in steep terrain and rough ground, with a view for some distance around. Whether or not the fort replaced an earlier one is unknown. By the time the Venetians abandoned it as well, the use of cannon had nullified most of its defensive value, as the bombardment of the Parthenon at Athens by Turkish ships had demonstrated. The Parthenon had been considered a secure location to store gunpowder. The Turks were not interested in occupying Kastri, and in general, fixed positions today are an easy target for persistent bombardment. They may hold out heroically for a time, but without supporting troops in the region are doomed to fall. Itanos to the north had been similarly abandoned centuries earlier.

The promontory is partly in the water. Its long dimension along the water is 423.83 m (463.51 yd). Its short dimension is 286.65 m (313.48 yd). It is flanked by Kouremenos beach on the north and Chiona beach on the south. The Minoan settlement at Rousolakkos is located behind Chiona beach. The coordinates of the promontory are 35°12′10″N 26°16′33″E, which are not to be confused with another, much smaller promontory at the south end of Chiona beach.

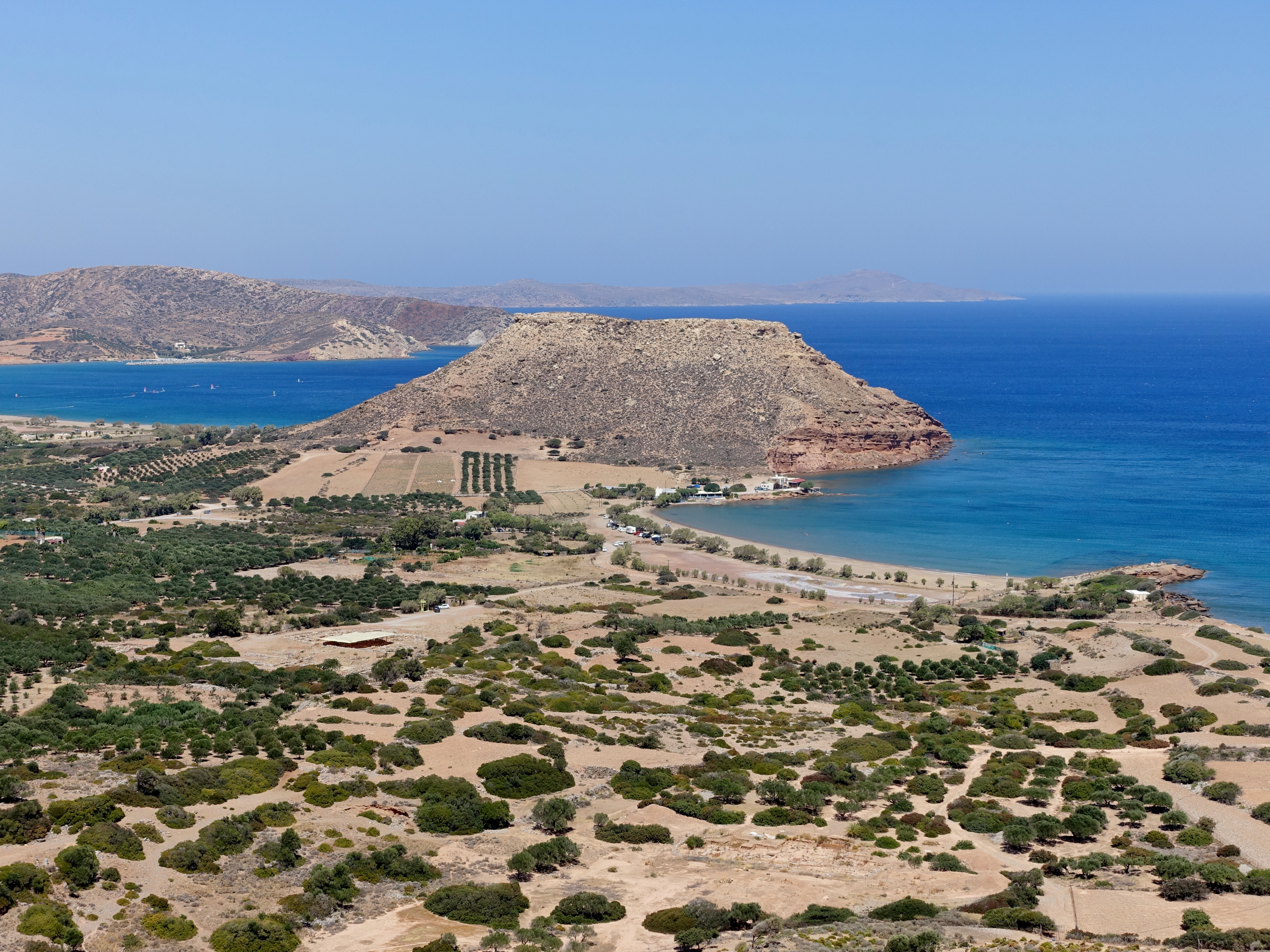
Rousolakkos in the foreground, Kastri in the background. The slope on the left side of the promontory is 22°; on the right side, 40°. The former is habitable; the latter, not. The apparent flat area at the top is a razor-back ridge. The cliffs at the bottom go all the way around. Nothing cultivatable is in evidence, although indigenous species are sure to be found there.

The center of Palaikastro is about 2 km (1.2 mi) due west from there. To obtain such a name as "old fort," Palaikastro at the time must have been close to the promontory, in the Bronze Age, most likely at Rousolakkos. There is some evidence that the Minoans moved around the base, leaving remains even on the light slopes leading up to the promontory.

It is incorrect to say, however, that anyone ever "inhabited" or "moved to" some sort of "hill" there. The promontory, though fortifiable to some extent, is no more habitable than the Rock of Gibraltar. Even if the population attempted to build housing up the cliffs, as is true of some Greek coastal towns, there would be a rockfall problem. There is no sign that this problem was ever addressed there. On the seaward side, the high cliffs with beating waves would have made use of the promontory as a port impossible. The promontory is not a hill, and no one ever settled on it or built up its treacherous slopes. No refugees could live for long in the citadel, due to lack of water, food, and space. It would have been easily isolated. It undoubtedly had value as a lookout and early warning station.

== Administrative substructure ==
The local community of Palaikastro comprises several settlements (oikismoi).

Name	Greek	Location	Description
Agathia or Angathia	Αγκάθια	35°11′46″N 26°15′51″E	Commercial village E of P.
Ayos Nikolaos	Άγιος Νικόλαος	35°09′16″N 26°10′26″E	Formerly in Mitato district.
Mitato	Μητάτο	35°09′17″N 26°10′26″E	Formerly in Mitato district.
Chiona	Χιώνα	35°11′52″N 26°16′37″E	Chiona Beach N of Cape Plaka. Roussolakkos is located there, site of the ancient Minoan city forced inland to P. over the centuries.
Chochlakies	Χοχλακιές	35°08′50″N 26°14′48″E	Village to the W of Chochlakies Gorge S of Cape Plaka
Kouremenos	Κουρεμένος	35°12′43″N 26°16′00″E	Kouremenos Beach is located to the NE of P. up to and including Tenda Point.
Kryoneri	Κρυονέρι	35°09′38″N 26°09′47″E	Formerly in Mitato district.
Kyriamadi	Κυριαμάδι	35°17′51″N 26°18′09″E	So structured as to make Kyriamadi Forward Naval Base a separate settlement, though not under local jurisdiction.
Lydia	Λύδια	35°11′36″N 26°14′03″E	Rural area W of the town.
Mertydia	Μερτύδια	35°11′43″N 26°14′20″E	Rural area W of the town.
Palaikastro	Παλαίκαστρον	35°11′57″N 26°15′16″E	The center of town itself without the other settlements.
Toplou	Τοπλού	35°13′16″N 26°12′57″E	So structured as to make Toplou Monastery and the lands on which it sits a separate settlement. The monastery owns lands elsewhere as well.
Vigla	Βίγλα	35°13′07″N 26°15′44″E	A hotel district to the north of Kouremenos beach
Vrisidi	Βρυσίδι	35°08′42″N 26°11′18″E	Formerly in Mitato district

== Economy ==
The main economic activity of the approximately 1100 inhabitants continues to be agriculture. Olives and grape vines are cultivated and a few fishermen remain. Commercial fishing however is difficult these days because of the substantial overfishing in the Mediterranean Sea. Tourism is an important source of supplementary income and is likely to remain so.

== Historical significance ==
It is a historic site. Already in Minoan times the region was a centre of trade. The port of Itanos, today several meters below sea level, is mentioned in ancient times. The very extensive Minoan commercial settlement Roussolakkos close to the Chiona beach, excavated by English archaeologists, clearly shows that the region was one of the most important commercial centres of the Minoan culture in the extreme east of the island of Crete.

== Antiquities ==
The Minoan Moulds of Palaikastro were discovered in October 1899 by a farmer 150 metres (160 yd) northeast of the town of Palaikastro. The Palaikastro Kouros is a carved figure of a youth that was recovered in fragments between 1987 and 1990.

Mount Petsofas above the town has the ruins of a Minoan peak sanctuary.

== Gallery ==
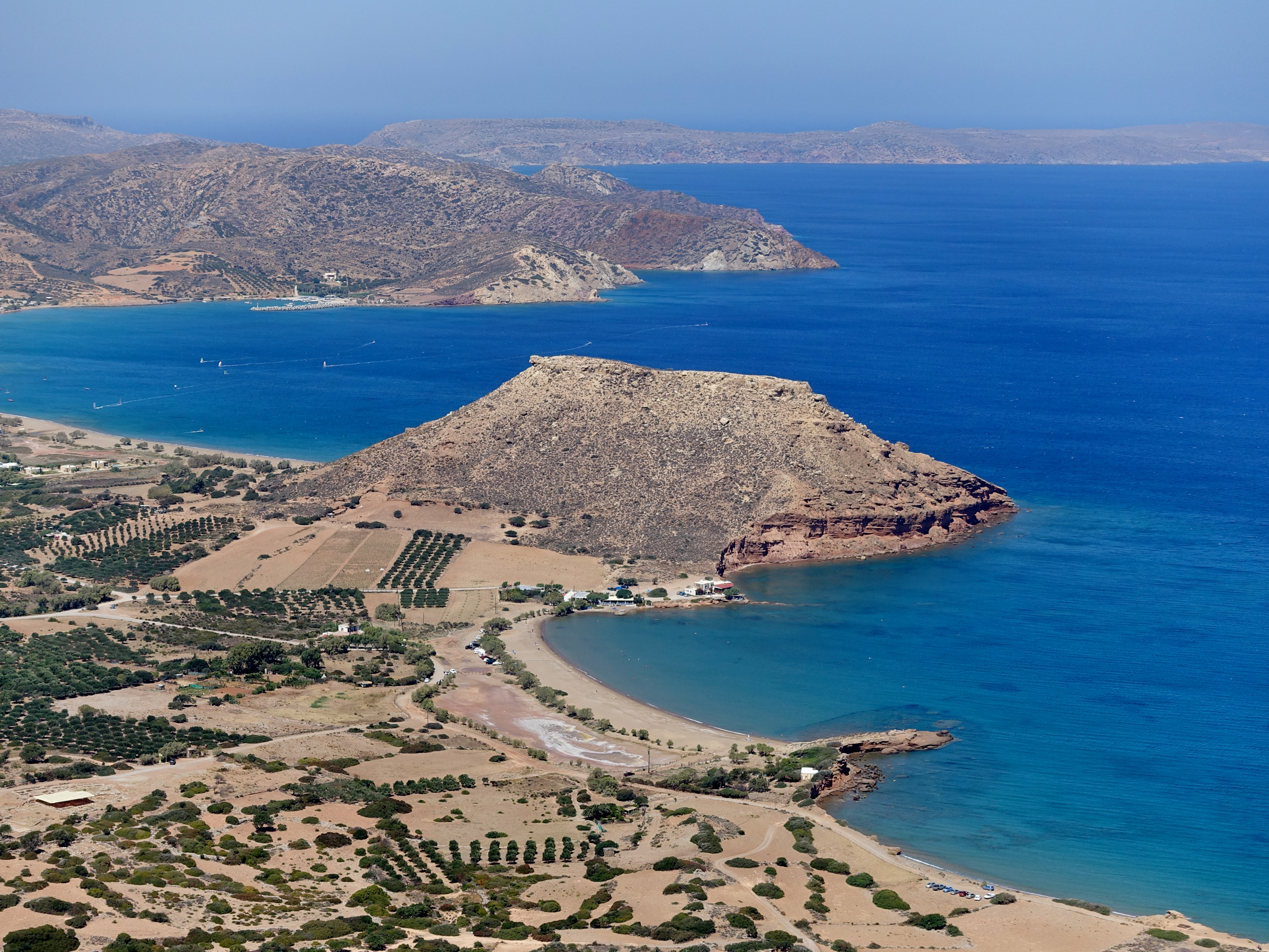
Kastri hill

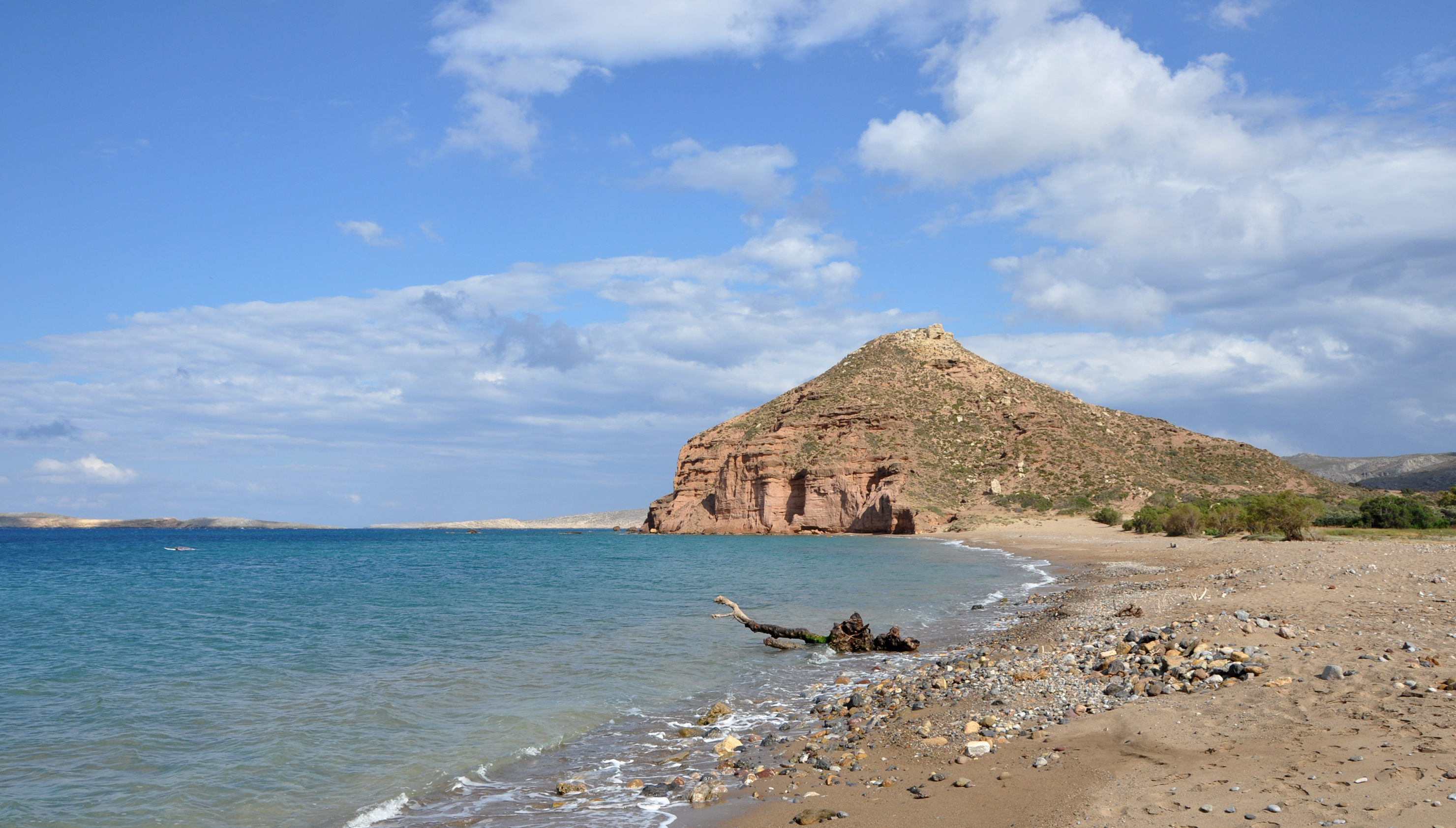
Kastri Hill

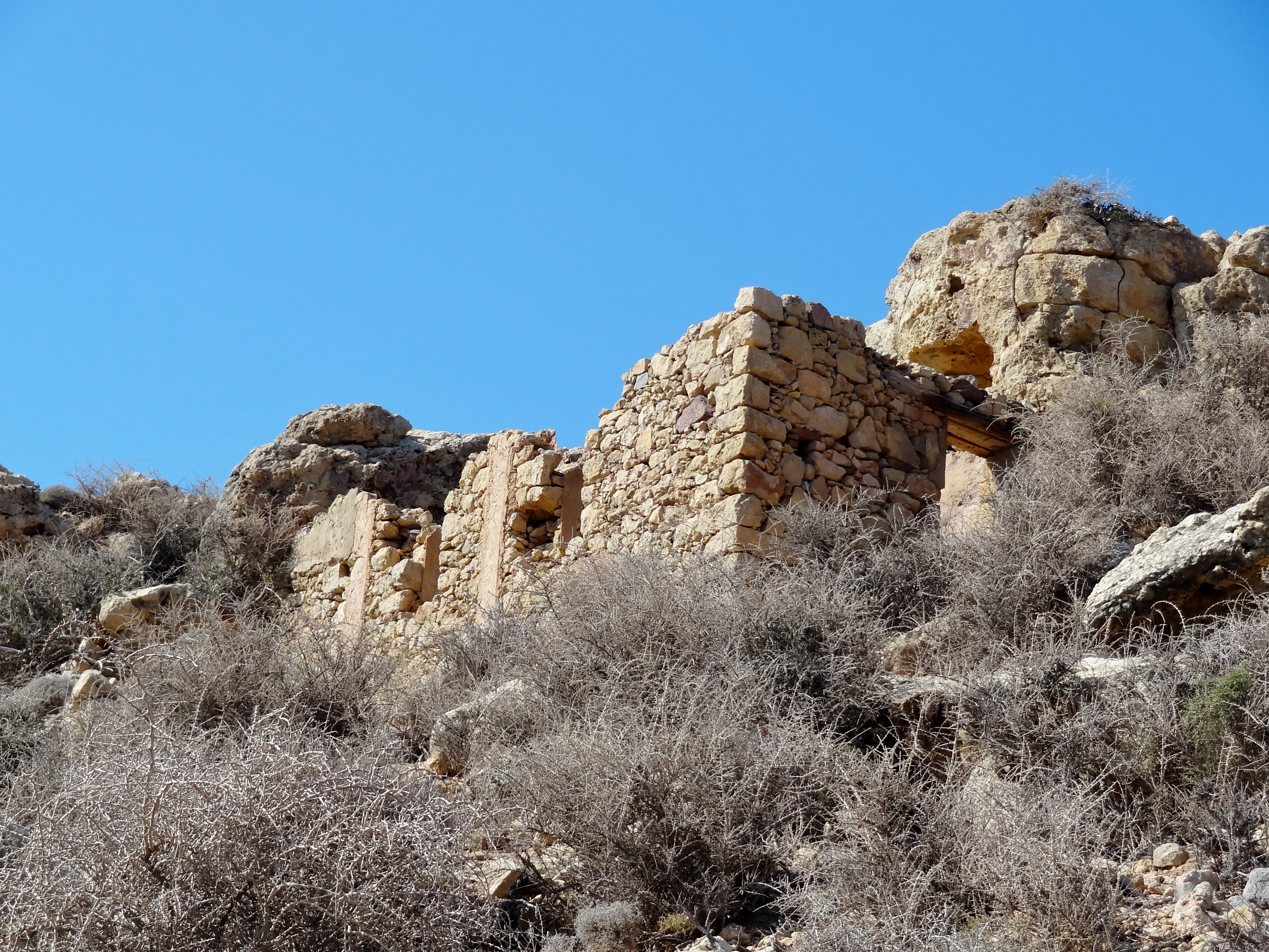
Remaining fortification

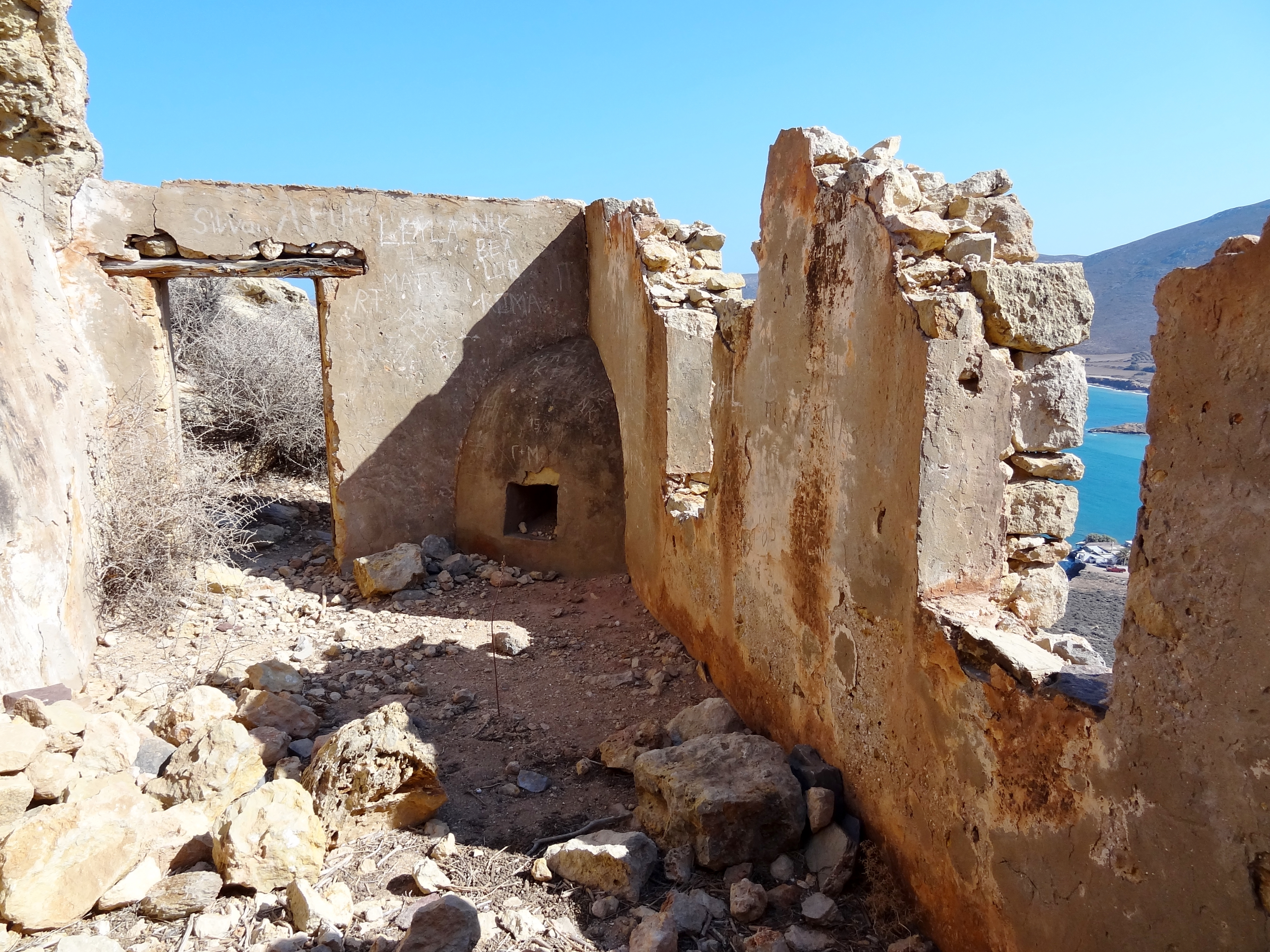
Remaining fortification

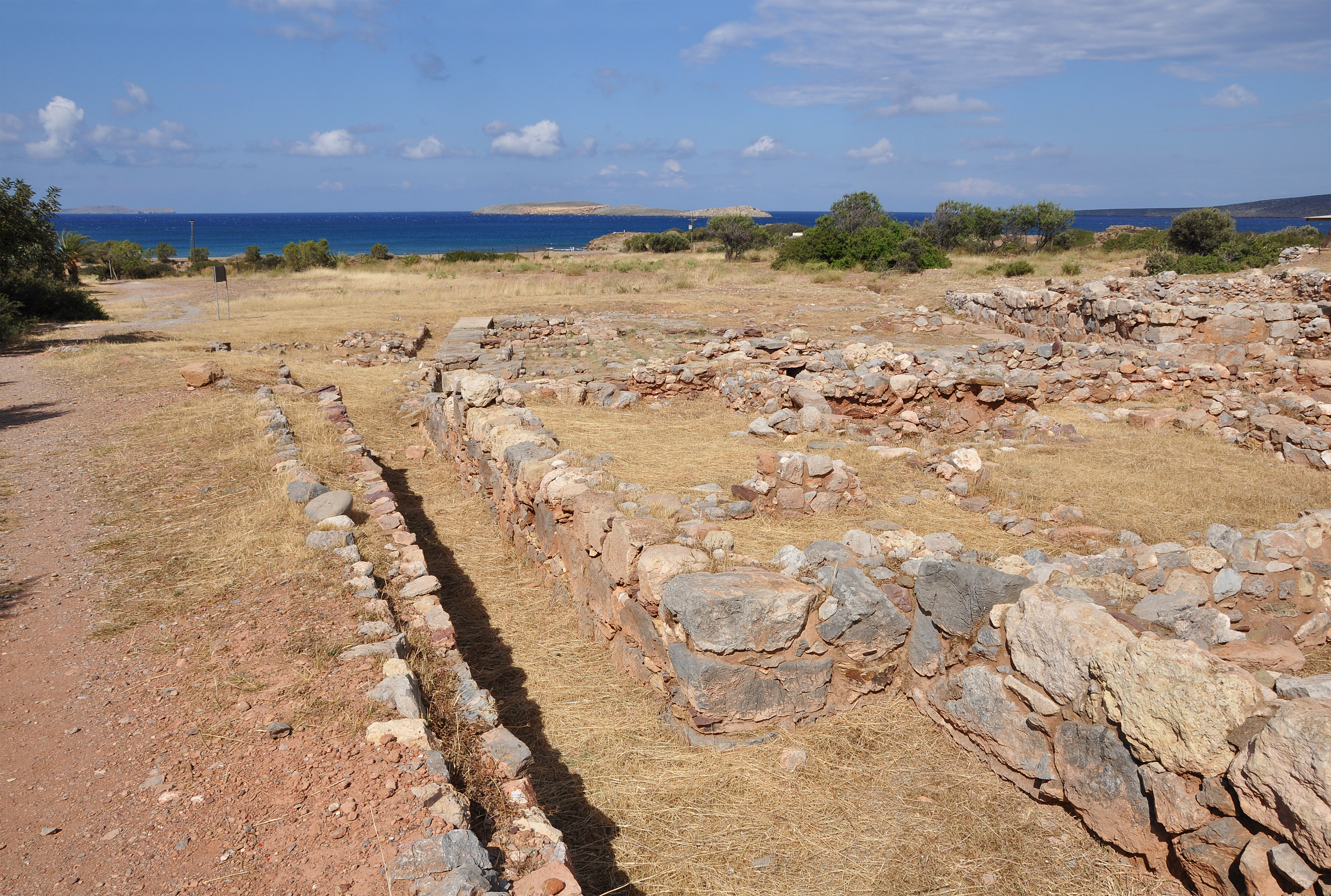
The Minoan site of Roussolakkos

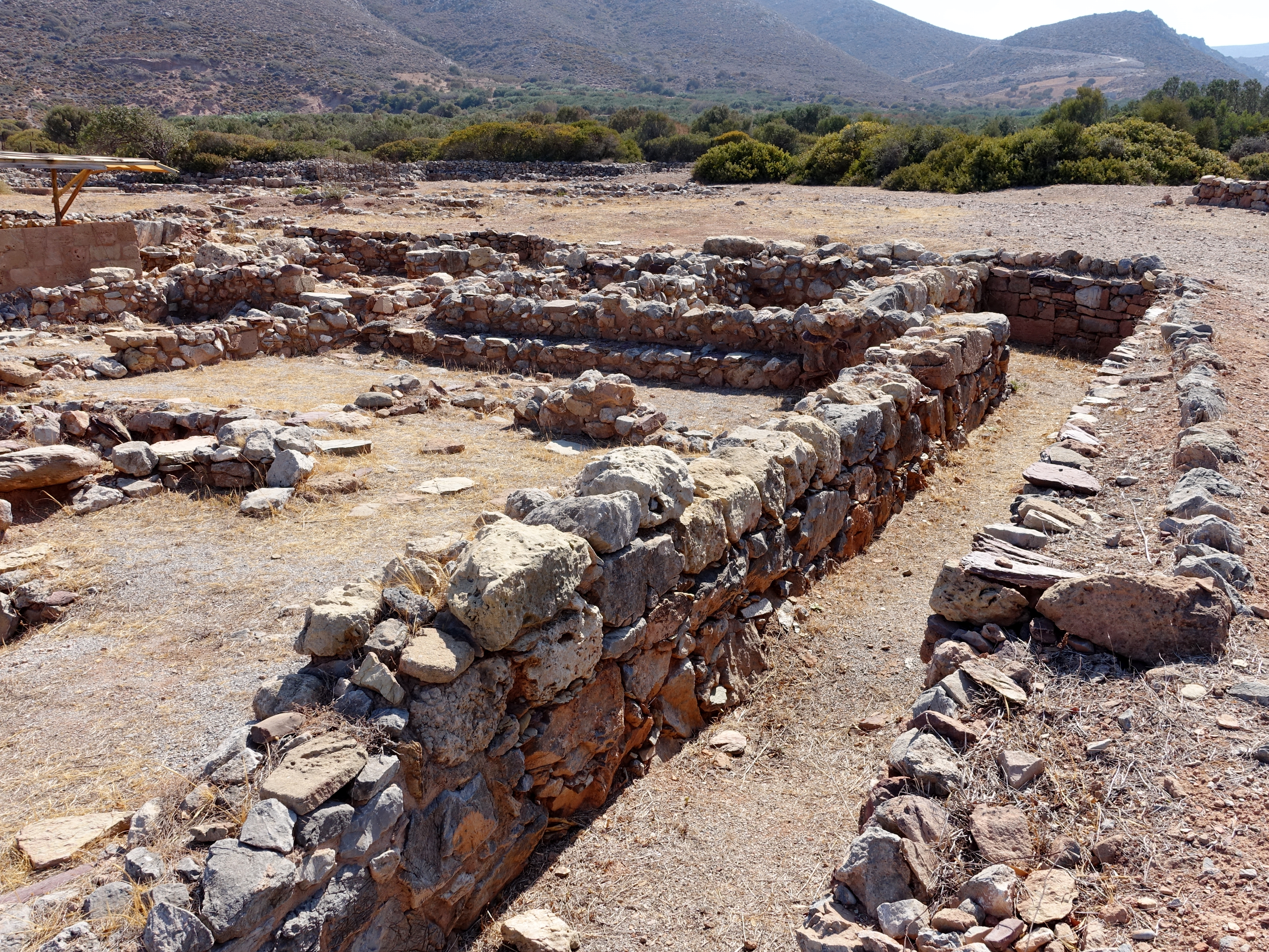
Roussolakkos

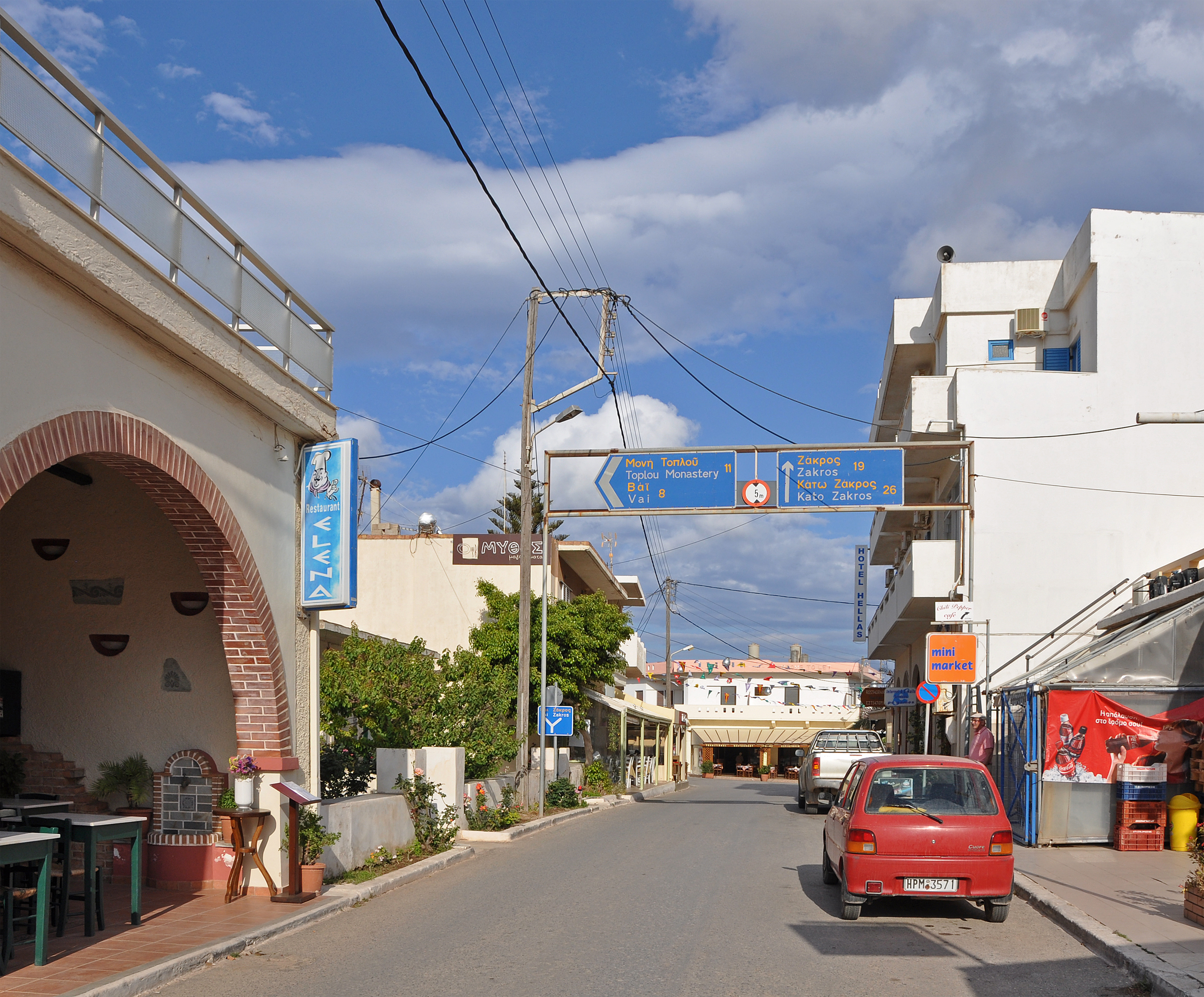
Main street

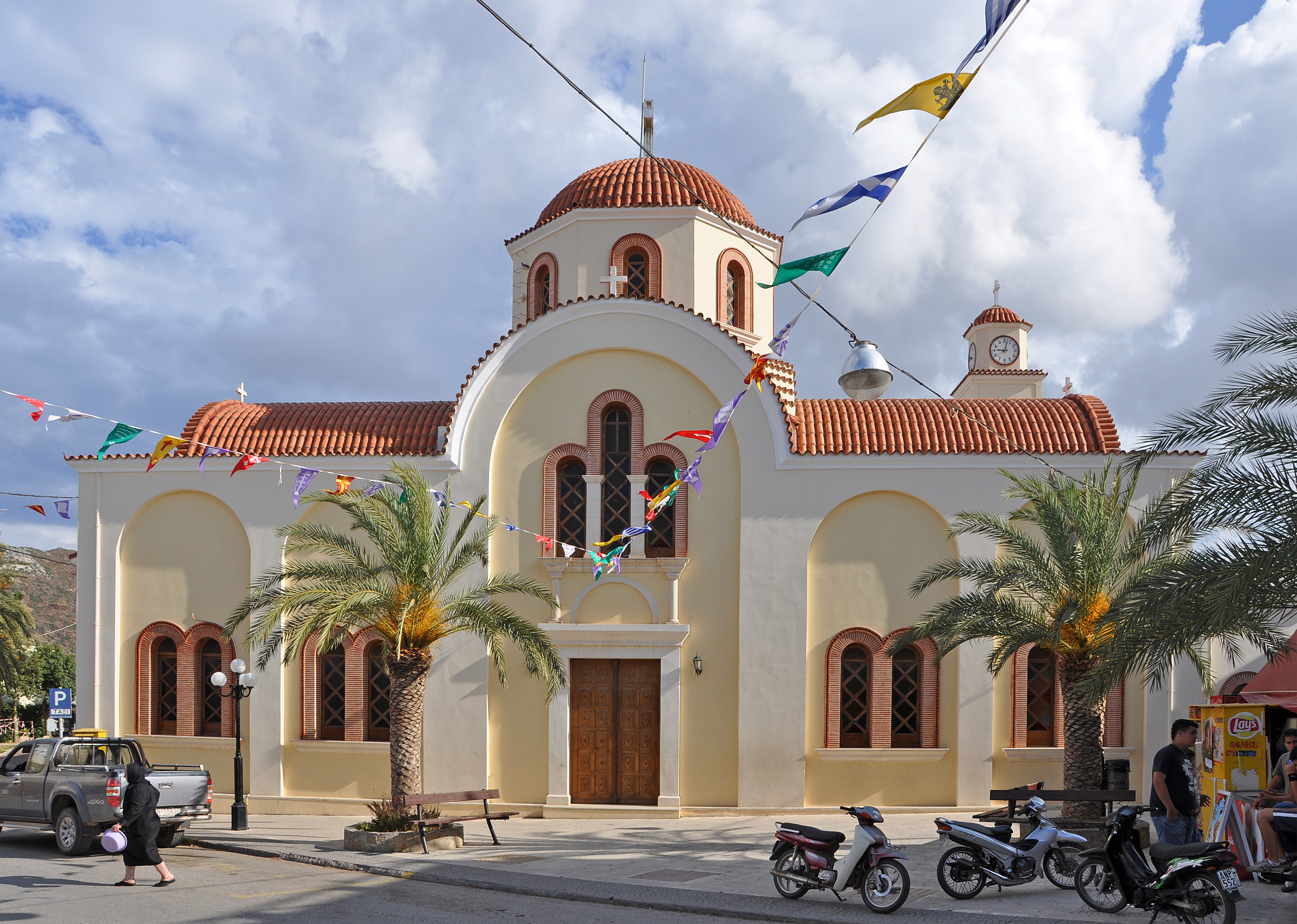
The church
