= Zakros =

Minoan archaeological site in Eastern Crete, Greece

- 35°05′53″N 26°15′41″E
- Type: Minoan town and "palace"
- Cultures: Minoan
- Location: Lasithi, Crete, Greece

Site notes
- Excavation dates: 1901, 1961-1992
- Archaeologists: D. G. Hogarth, N. Platon
- Public access: Yes

UNESCO World Heritage Site
- Part of: Minoan Palatial Centres
- Criteria: Cultural: ii, iii, iv, vi
- Reference: 1733-003
- Inscription: 2025 (47th Session)

Zakros (Greek: Ζάκρος also Zakro or Kato Zakro) is a Minoan archaeological site on the eastern coast of Crete in Lasithi, Greece. It is regarded as one of the six Minoan palaces, and its protected harbor and strategic location made it an important commercial hub for trade to the east.

The town was dominated by the Palace of Zakro, originally built around 1900 BC, rebuilt around 1600 BC, and destroyed around 1450 BC along with the other major centers of Minoan civilization. Extensive ruins of the palace remain, and are a popular tourist destination.

Zakros is sometimes divided into Epano Zakros (Upper Zakros), the portion higher up on the hillside, and Kato Zakros (Lower Zakros), the part near the sea. A Minoan villa was discovered on the road from Epano Zakos near the gorge. It is dated to the Minoan LM IA period (c. 1700–1625 BC), before the construction of the palace. A pithos found there had a Linear A inscription around its rim recording a large quantity (32 units) of wine. A ravine (usually referred to as a gorge in archaeological publications) known as the "Ravine of the Dead" runs through both the upper and lower parts of the ancient site, named after the numerous burials that have been found in the caves along its walls.

== History ==
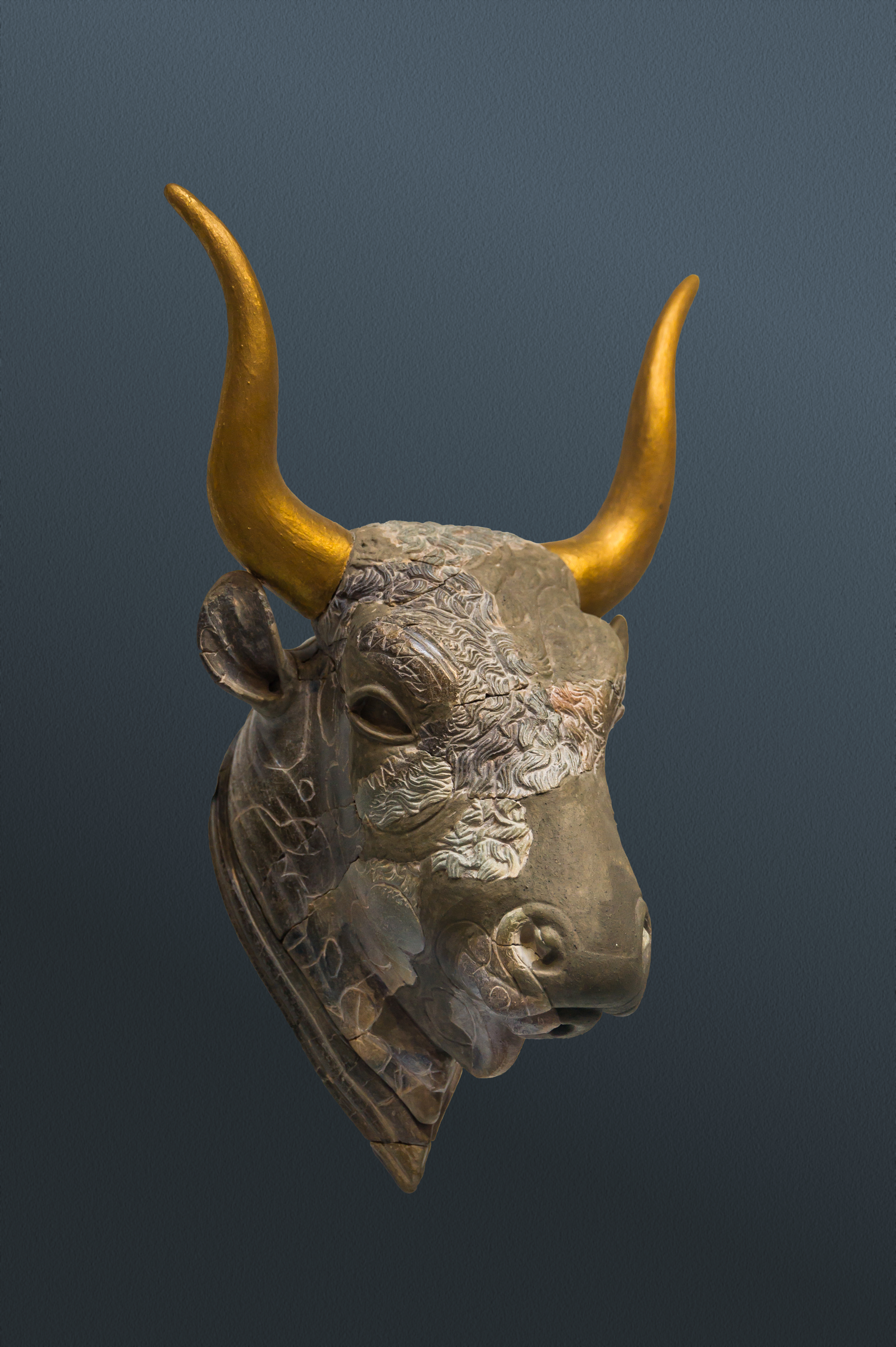
Zakros bull's head rhyton

The site was first occupied in the Early Minoan III to Middle Minoan IA period (c. 2000 BC). The monumental construction at the site proceeded in two phases. The Old Palace was built late in the Middle Minoan period and then destroyed by a large seismic event c. 1700 BC. At that point the New Palace was constructed. It was destroyed in another seismic event c. 1450 BC (between the Late Minoan IA and Late Minoan IB periods). There was a limited degree of occupation which then ceased entirely c. 1200 BC (Late Minoan III period). A 3 meter wide slab paved guttered road, built during the ProtoPalatial period, connected Kato Zakros and its harbor. It led to the northeast gate of the palace. During the Minoan era the sea level dropped 4 times (−4.00 ± 0.30 m, −2.85 ± 0.30 m, −1.25 ± 0.05 m, and −0.50 ± 0.05 m), or the land rose, of major significance to a harbor city. To the north a large Protopalatial and Neopalatial town occupied the hills around the palace. The town, like the palace, was laid out with a rectilinear paved road system. Based on the road width and lack of wheel wear it is assumed that transport was by pack animals.

It has been proposed that the ancient name of the site was Dikta.

In 2025, the site was designated as a World Heritage Site by UNESCO.

== Archaeology ==
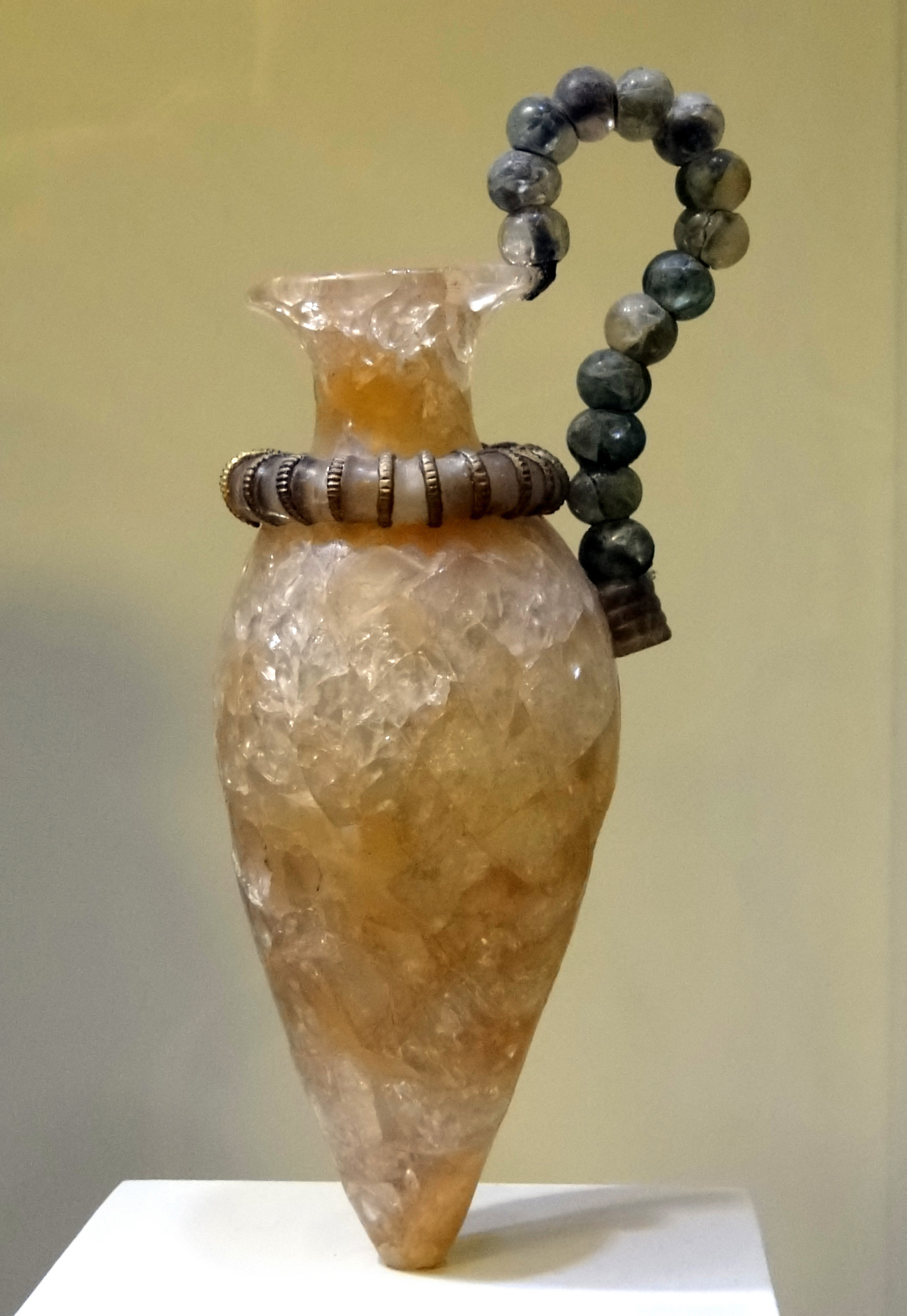
Libation vase from Zakros

The site was first recorded by Thomas Abel Brimage Spratt in 1851.

The site was visited by Arthur Evans, excavator of Knossos, in 1894 and 1896. Zakro was excavated by D. G. Hogarth of the British School of Archaeology at Athens under the auspices of the Cretan Exploration Fund in 1901 working primarily in the central area, Ayios Antonios. Finds included bronze tools, pottery, loom weights, furniture, and a winepress (7 have now been found in total, all in the town area). In a stone cellar in one of the 12 homes excavated on the hill to the northeast a small horde of bronze implements was found including two axe heads and three lances. Some of the pottery from later contexts was of Mycenaean Greek type. Some small sites (Xerokambolina, Ambelis, Anthropolites, Tou Koukou to Kephali, and S' tas Tavernas) in the upper Zakros Valley near Espano Zakros were also examined. Two pits were excavated by Hogarth, the primary one being 16 feet in diameter and 18 feet deep with a deposit of 8 feet in depth at the bottom (with the top 3 feet disturbed by looting villagers). Artifacts, primarily pottery, found in the pit date to the LM IA period. A single Linear A inscribed roundel (3.00 by 2.80 by 1.20 centimeters) was found, in the same deposit with a Linear A tablet and a number of clay sealings. Three of the sealings were inscribed with Cretan hieroglyphs. The deposit was in a destruction layer dated between layers LM IA and LM IB. Human remains were found in caves at the gorge.

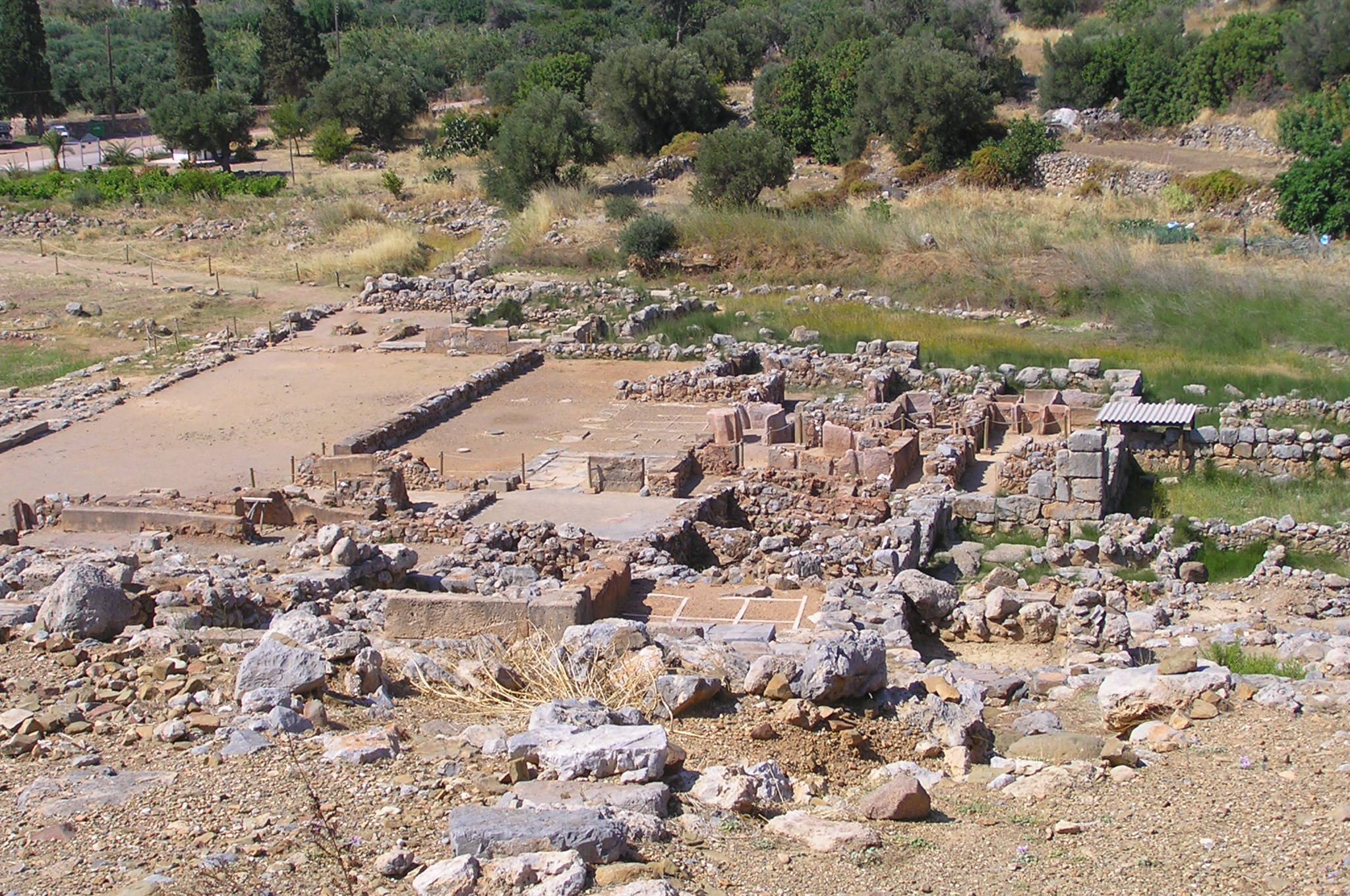
The Palace of Zakros ruins

In 1961, Nikolaos Platon resumed the excavation and discovered the Palace of Zakro (the New Palace). The palace (or administrative center), with an area of about 8000 square meters and with about 150 rooms, featured two large paved courtyards, one central and one to the west. His work there continued until he died in 1992 and appears to have then been continued by Lefteris Plato. Much of the focus of excavation was on the slope northeast of the palace including the "Strong Building", "Little Tower Building", and the "Pottery Stores Building". During excavation an irrigation project to the west of the site revealed Middle Minoan tomb enclosures at Pezoules Kephala. Two enclosures were excavated, one a single tomb and one a multi-chambered tomb. Articulated skeletons were recovered and later examined. This site has yielded several clay tablets with Linear A inscriptions. Copper oxhide ingots dated to LM IA were found. One Egyptian stonebridge‑spouted jar which had been locally modified was found.

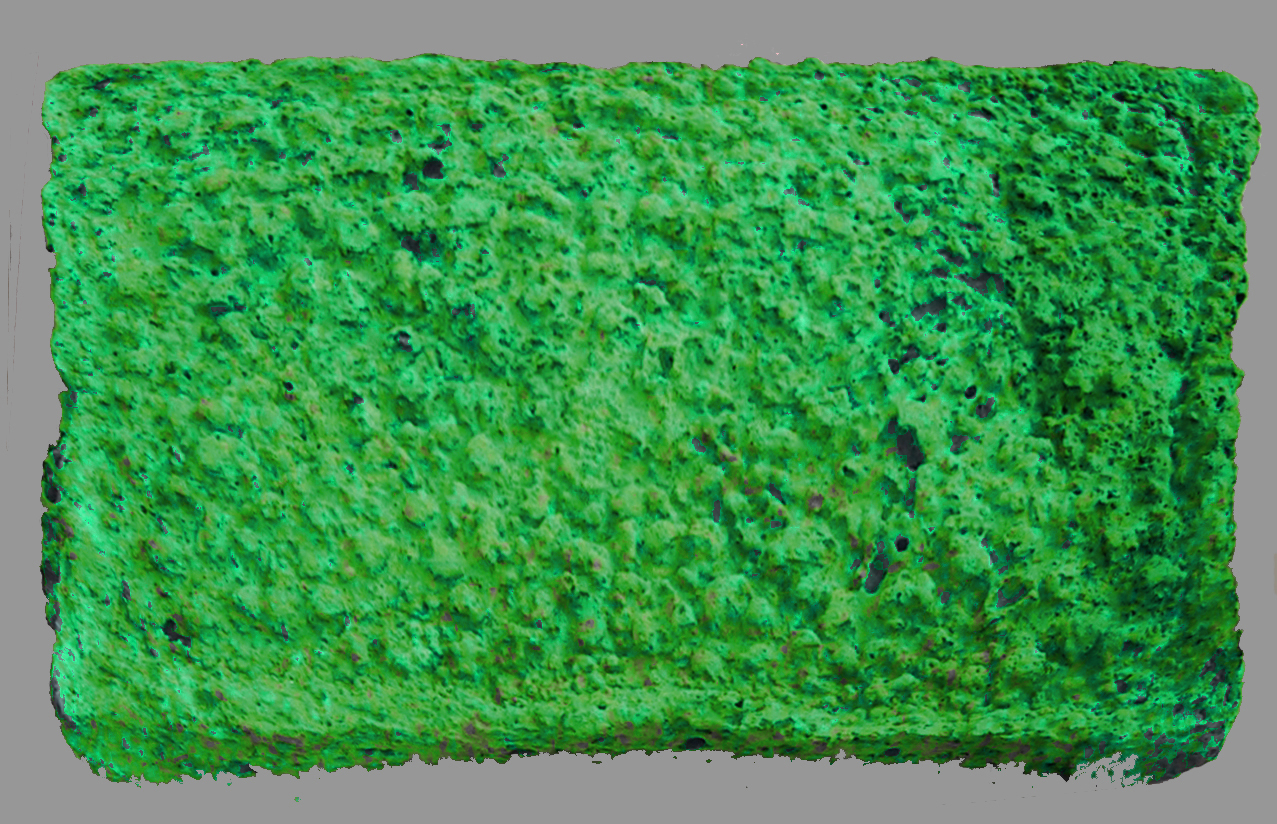
Copper oxhide ingot found at Zakros

A number of seals, mainly of steatite, and clay sealings have been found at Zakros. Two Egyptian Early Dynastic bowls were found in the cult repository of the Palace. It is thought that they stemmed from the widespread trade in robbed Egyptian tomb artifacts in that period. Zakros is the second largest source of recovered Linear A inscriptions, after Haghia Triada. In total 591 documents were found consisting of 31 tablets and 560 sealed documents.

Many of the excavated artifacts are housed at the Heraklion Archaeological Museum. Some items, given to Hogarth by the Cretan government, are housed at the Ashmolean Museum.

== See also ==
- Hagia Triada
- Minoan pottery
- Minoan chronology
- Minoan art
- Minoan religion
- Minoan eruption
