= Cult of Zeus =

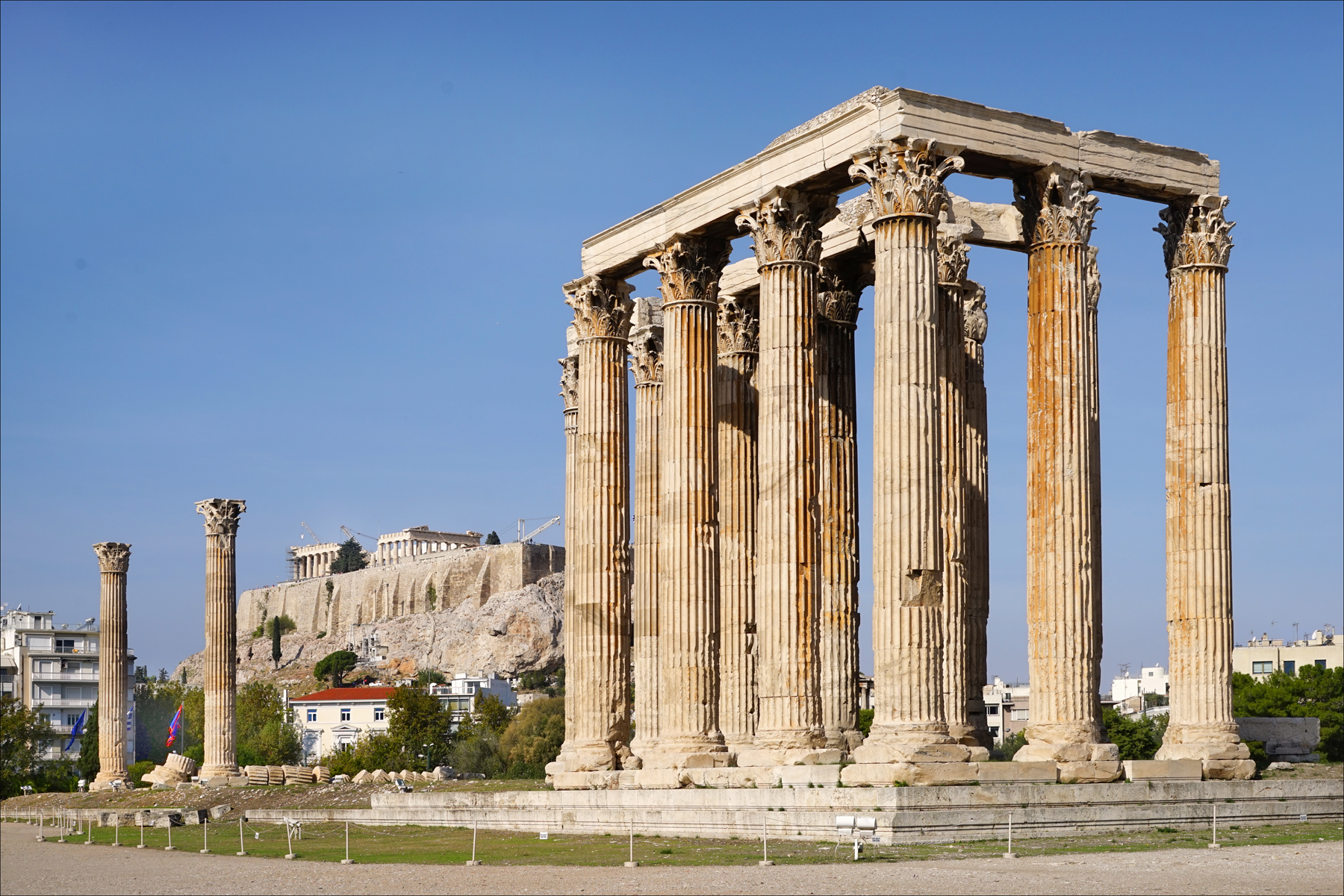
The remains of the Temple of Zeus Olympios at Athens

The religious practice in honour of Zeus, known as his "cult", stretched across the Greek world. He seldom occupied an elevated position in the pantheons of individual cities, few of which had him as their patron god. He was often worshipped on the peaks of mountains, and his Panhellenic sanctuaries (which attracted Greeks from afar) were located in remote areas.

Zeus's cult is attested as early as the 2nd millennium BC, his with name appearing on tablets written in Linear B (a script of Mycenaean Greek). His preeminent sanctuary was Olympia, where the high point of the religious festival which included the ancient Olympic Games was a giant sacrifice of cattle to Zeus. It was the site of a a temple dedicated to him, the largest in the Peloponnese, and an ash altar measuring 6.5 metres (21 ft) in height, composed of bones and ash which had accumuluated from repeated sacrifice. At Nemea, another athletic festival, the Nemean Games, was held in his honour. Under different epithets (surnames or titles), he was the recipient of Athenian festivals such as the Dipolieia and Diasia. His Cretan cult sites included a sanctuary at Palaikastro, where the Hymn to Zeus Diktaios was discovered, and a cave on Mount Ida, where he was worshipped for over 1000 years. His sanctuary on the peak of Mount Lykaion, in Arcadia, was rumoured in antiquity to have been the site of human sacrifice.

== Distribution and characteristics ==
In the context of ancient history, "cult" describes the practices used to venerate a particular superhuman entity; (Note: Vecoli, "Abstract" and para. 1. Vecoli's second definition, of "cult" as a form of religious sect, is not applicable here.) for the Greeks, such actions included sacrifices, prayers, the celebration of festivals, and the construction of temples and altars. The cult in honour of Zeus extended across the Greek world, and existed from the Bronze Age until late antiquity. Although Zeus was the head of the Greek pantheon, he was rarely afforded an elevated position within the local pantheons of individual cities, only occupying such a role from the 4th century BC onwards. (Note: Kreutz, p. 259. On his occupying no major role in cities before the 4th century BC, see Linke 2014, pp. 85–86. Linke 2006, p. 94 with n. 31 makes a similar statement to Kreutz, but specific to the archaic period.) He was the patron god of few individual poleis (city-states; sing.: 'polis'), and seldom were there sanctuaries dedicated to him on acropoleis (the upper part of Greek cities; sing.: 'acropolis'). Fritz Graf writes that Zeus's protection, which was universal, could not be restricted to a single polis, and Walter Burkert describes Zeus as an impartial figure whom "[h]ardly any city can claim [...] simply as its city god". Bernhard Linke argues that Zeus occupied a decentralised position within the polis because a concentrated cult to a god of such immense importance would have threatened to destabilise the balance of power. (Note: Linke 2017, "General Overviews", summarising Linke 2006, pp. 89–120.)

Early on, Zeus was worshipped primarily in remote locations. A common place of Zeus's cult was the mountain peak, a natural abode for a god who presided over the sky and rain. On these peaks, he often bore an epithet, a surname or title which accompanied his name (such as "Ombrios" in "Zeus Ombrios", meaning 'Zeus of rain'); such epithets often derived from the name of the mountain or expressed an aspect of his personality there. (Note: Schwabl 1978, p. 1045. On epithets in Greek religion, see Rose & Hornblower, paras. 1–2. For the translation of "Zeus Ombrios", see Parker 1996, p. 31.) At Olympia, Dodona, and Nemea, Zeus was the recipient of Panhellenic sanctuaries (which attracted Greeks from across large distances); these three sites were located far outside cities, seemingly an defining quality of his Panhellenic cult. Zeus's earliest temples, attested from the 6th century BC, were later than those to other gods, with his worship initially taking place under the open sky.

Zeus was more multiform and had a greater variety of cultic associations than any other Greek god. (Note: Simon, p. 11 (multiformity); Linke 2006, p. 92 (variety of cultic associations). Henrichs & Bäbler, "II. Epicleses and sphere of influence", para. 1 writes that the "diversity of natural phenomena, common interests and polis institutions" over which he presides is greater than all other deities.) He was thought to control the weather, including rain and lightning, and in places was associated with fertility and vegetation, sometimes acquiring traits which were chthonic ('of the earth'). (Note: Tiverios et al., p. 311. For this translation, see Felton, p. 90.) He was the protector of the social order, and had functions pertaining to aspects of society such as families, property, clans, and the agora (a public assembly space within poleis). Hundreds of his cult epithets survive, (Note: Linke 2006, p. 92 with n. 17. According to Linke, he probably had considerably more epithets beyond those which survive.) some of which were Panhellenic in importance, appearing in both literature and regional cultic contexts, with others pertaining to specific locations; certain epithets allude to the content of rituals. The different manifestations of Zeus expressed in epithets could be treated as disparate in certain contexts, and part of a unified whole in others.

Across his cult, Zeus was worshipped alongside most of the other Olympians (the main gods of the pantheon), as well as heroes (mortals worshipped after death). (Note: Henrichs & Bäbler, "IV. Rites, cults, festivals", para. 2. On the definition in a cultic context, see Hansen, p. 200.) The Romans identified him with their own chief god, Jupiter, who shared several fundamental functions with Zeus, such as control of the sky and weather. Jupiter's cult was commonly located on hills, though seldom on mountain summits, and he had a temple on the Capitoline Hill in Rome, whereas no important temple of Zeus was located on an acropolis. Jupiter was also was much more political in nature: he was thought to have a particular loyalty to Rome, and to be the city's protector.

Map showing some of Zeus's major locations of worship on the Greek mainland (including the Peloponnese), in Anatolia, and on Crete

== Mycenaean Greece and continuity ==
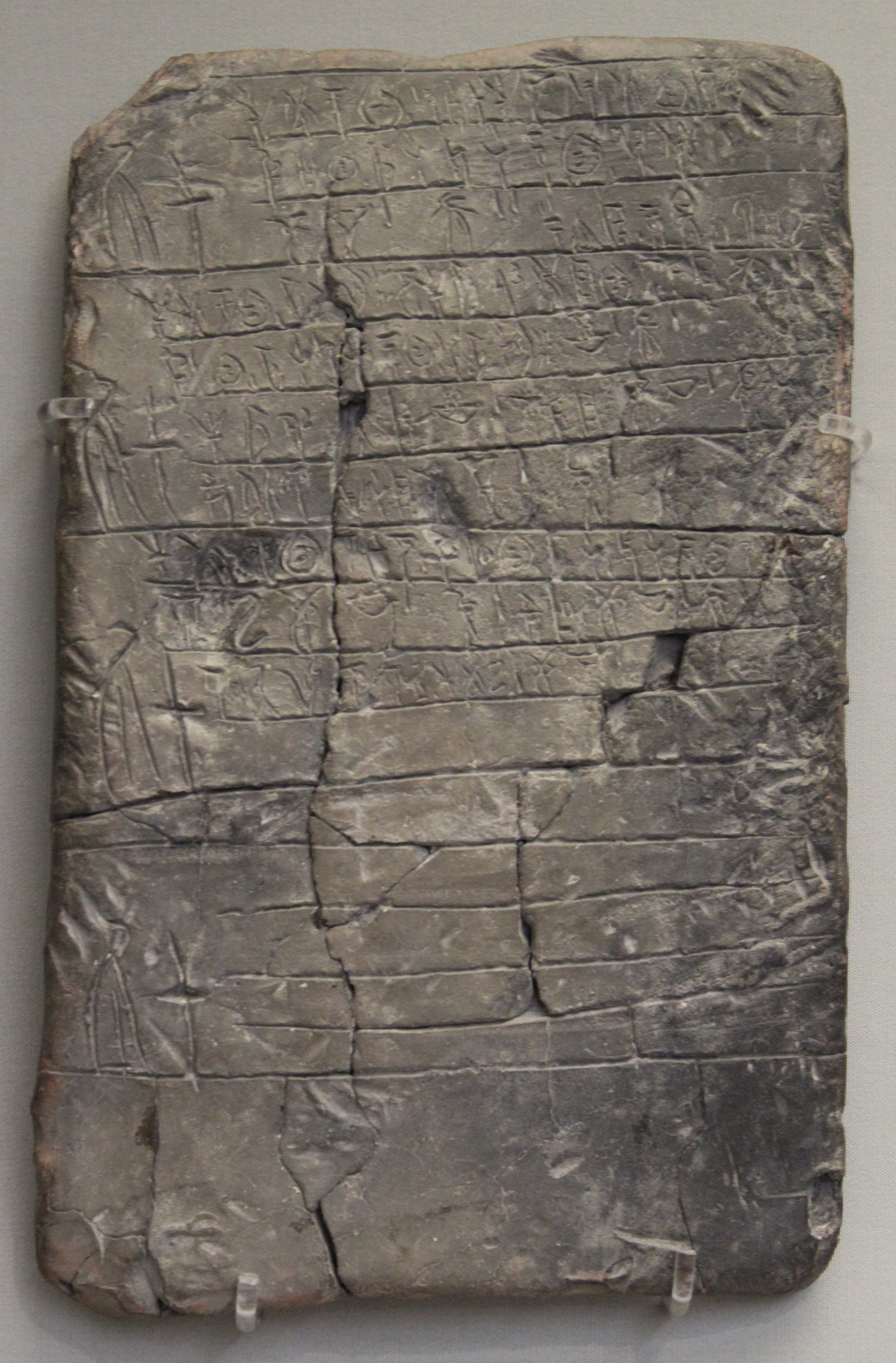
Tn 316, a Linear B tablet from Pylos, lists offerings to Zeus, Hera, and one "Drimios" (described as Zeus's son).

Zeus's cult is attested as far back as the 2nd millennium BC. References to his name appear on tablets composed in Linear B, a script used c. 1400–1200 BC to write in Mycenaean Greek. One such tablet from Pylos describes offerings to Zeus, Hera, and a son of Zeus named "Drimios", (Note: Burkert 2001, p. 3; Henrichs & Bäbler, III. Zeus in myth and literature, para. 1; Tn 316 (Ventris & Chadwick, pp. 286–287).) indicating a shared cult between the three figures at a Pylian sanctuary of Zeus. A tablet from Chania, Crete, similarly mentions a sanctuary of Zeus (located in that city's vicinity), (Note: Hallager, Vlasakis & Hallager, p. 80; KH Gq 5 (Killen, p. 876).) where there was joint worship of Zeus and Dionysus. Two tablets from Knossos refer to a cult of Zeus Diktaios ('of Mt Dikte') (Note: Schwabl 1978, p. 1006; Kolotourou, para. 4; KN Fp 1 (Ventris & Chadwick, pp. 305–306). For this translation, see Dowden 2006, p. 29.) and to a month of Zeus during which offerings of oil were given "to all the gods". (Note: Kerenyi, p. 22; KN Fp 5 (Melena & Firth, p. 166).) Tablets from Pylos and Knossos also attest a goddess named di-wi-ja, seemingly a feminine counterpart of Zeus.

The Mycenaeans seemingly introduced Zeus to Crete around the latter half of the 15th century BC, (Note: Schwabl 1978, p. 1006 gives "around the middle of the 15th century", while Vikela, p. 204 writes "around 1400 B.C.".) and amalgamated him there with a local Minoan deity. Walter Burkert views Zeus already as "one of the most important gods, perhaps even the highest god" in the Mycenaean period. Such a place within the pantheon could be indicated by the frequency and geographic spread of the references to him. Ratko Duev contends that the offerings to Zeus described on the tablets are often no greater (and sometimes smaller) than those to other deities, which does not suggest an exceptional position.

The degree of continuity between the religion of Mycenaean Greece and that of the archaic period has been a matter of scholarly dispute. At the sanctuary of Zeus on Mount Lykaion, 21st-century excavations of the ash altar to the god have found evidence of its continuous ritual use from Mycenaean times to the Hellenistic period (c. 323–30 BC). Ritual animal sacrifice stretching back to the 15th and 16th centuries BC is indicated by burned animals bones, which were found mingled with pottery, figurines, and other objects. (Note: Romano & Voyatzis 2021, pp. 1–4, 6–9. For a more detailed discussion of the results of the excavations, see Romano & Voyatzis 2014.) Martina Dieterle views archaeological evidence dating to the Bronze Age (c. 3000–1000 BC) at Dodona (a sanctuary of Zeus attested from the 8th century BC) as probable indication of early cultic activity there, though she repudiates the theory of a continuous cult of Zeus from the Mycenaean period. According to Birgitta Eder, pottery from Olympia (the location of a major sanctuary to Zeus) suggests that cultic activity began there in the 11th century BC, as opposed to having descended from a cult of the Palatial Bronze Age (c. 1400–1200 BC).

== Panhellenic sanctuaries ==
=== Olympia ===
Zeus's preeminent sanctuary was Olympia, situated in Elis, Peloponnese, near the river Alfeios. It was the site of the ancient Olympic Games, the oldest and greatest athletic festival of ancient Greece. Religious activity began at the site in the late 11th century BC, although the exact age of Zeus's cult there is unclear. (Note: Barringer 2021, p. 21; Barringer 2010, p. 158. Kyrieleis 2003, p. 55 believes his cult at the site commenced in the late 11th century BC.) The use of an ash altar, a pile of ash that would have accumulated over time as a result of repeated sacrifice, is attested from the late 11th century BC to the period around 600 BC. Bronze figurines from the Geometric period (c. 900–700 BC), depicting armed, helmeted men (often with raised arms), have been thought by some scholars to represent Zeus. (Note: Barringer 2010, p. 160. For a scholar who disagrees with this interpretation, see Himmelmann, pp. 96–97, 99.) From the end of the 8th century BC, poleis (Greek city-states) would gift one-tenth of the spoils from a victory to Zeus at Olympia; (Note: Baitinger, p. 125. For these dedications as spoils, see Barringer 2015, p. 24.) this could include weapons, armour, monuments, and tropaia (trophies, typically in the form of weapons or armour attached to a wooden structure). Military offerings predominate among the items discovered from the first half of the 1st millennium BC. The earliest temple at the site, the Temple to Hera, was erected around 600 BC, and was probably originally dedicated to Zeus, according to Ulrich Sinn. (Note: Sinn 2000, p. 50. For a survey of scholarly opinions on this notion, see Barringer 2010, pp. 160–161 n. 14.) Its construction prompted the ash altar to be relocated eastwards.

The Olympic Games' founding was traditionally dated to 776 BC, although archaeological evidence does not support their commencement in this exact year. (Note: Spivey, p. 235. The veracity of the dating to 776 BC has been a matter of debate among scholars (Stephen G. Miller 2004, p. 20). For a discussion of this date and the Games' early history, see Lee, pp. 110–118.) In myth, figures credited with their founding include the hero Pelops, Heracles, and Zeus himself. They were held in honour of Zeus Olympios ('Olympian, of Olympus'), (Note: Pirenne-Delforge & Pironti, pp. 156–157. For these translations, see Liddell & Scott, s.v. Ὀλύμπιος, who also include the translation "dwelling on Olympus".) and took place at four-year intervals; initially lasting one or two days, by the 5th century BC the festival had lengthened to five days. The earliest event was a roughly 200-metre (660 ft) running race (the stadion); further competitions were added over the Games' first few centuries, and in the 5th century BC events included horse racing, a pentathlon, wrestling, boxing, and pankration (a form of fighting with few rules). (Note: Richardson, paras. 1–2. On pankration, see Decker, para. 1.) Scholars refer to Olympia as "Panhellenic" because its competitions, of exceptional prestige, attracted and allowed entry to individuals from across Greece. (Note: Nielsen, pp. 134–135. Participation was open to any Greek who was male and free. The three other sanctuaries described as Panhellenic are Nemea, Delphi, and Isthmia.)

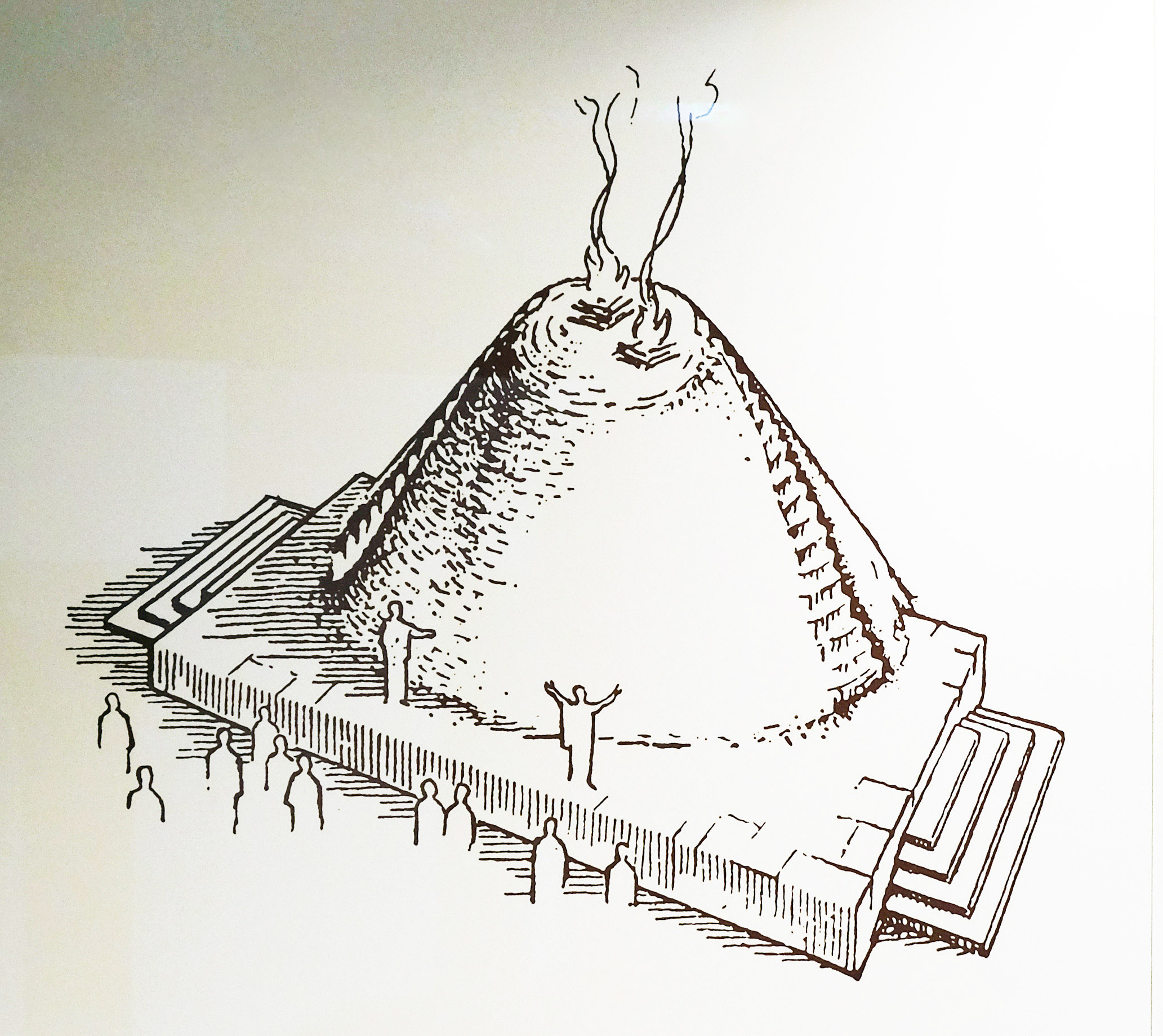
Reimagining of the altar of Zeus at Olympia (Note: For more precise reconstructions of the altar, see Romano & Voyatzis 2021, pp. 18–19, figures 18–19.)

The athletic competitions at Olympia took place as part of a religious festival. The zenith of this festival was an enormous sacrifice of cattle to Zeus, known as the "hecatomb", carried out on the god's ash altar. (Note: Larson 2007, p. 27. For the name "hecatomb", see Taita 2015, p. 112. This sacrifice took place on the festival's third day (Dillon, p. 571).) This ash altar was erected as part of a major construction program at the site, beginning in the first half of the 5th century BC. (Note: Taita 2015, p. 134. According to Taita, the previous altar, moved eastwards from its original location, "might have been in use for about a century", before the newer altar's construction.) According to the travel writer Pausanias (2nd century AD), this altar comprised a base of around 37 metres (121 ft) in perimeter (known as the próthusis, πρόθυσις), with stone steps on either side, and a pile of ashes atop the base, measuring around 6.5 metres (21 ft) in height and 9.5 metres (31 ft) in perimeter, accessible by steps in its sides. (Note: Sinn 2005, p. 15; Pausanias, 5.13.8 (Jones 1926, pp. 454–457). The dimensions given here are Sinn's approximate measurements in metres.) The cattle would have been killed on the altar's base, and their thigh bones taken to the peak and burned. The term "hecatomb" (hekatómbē, ἑκατόμβη), used by Lucian (2nd century AD) to refer to the sacrifice, implies that its victims were one hundred oxen, (Note: Taita 2015, p. 116. For the definition of the word, see Montanari, s.v. ἑκατόμβη, p. 622.) a notion which has been repeated in modern scholarship. According to Pausanias, sacrifices were also performed at the altar in the periods between festivals. (Note: Taita 2015, p. 115; Pausanias, 5.13.10 (Jones 1926, pp. 456–467).)

An oracle operated at the peak of the altar, and its seers interpreted signs from the altar's flames. The earliest author to mention oracular activity there is Pindar (5th century BC), although Sinn believes the oracle existed as early as the 8th century BC. Dating from 36 BC onwards, inscriptions from the site reference its seers as belonging to two families, the Iamidai and Klytiadai, (Note: Spivey, p. 175. For the period from which these inscriptions date, 36 BC to 265 AD, see Schachter 2000, p. 293.) said in myth to be the descendants of Iamus and Klytios, respectively. The former family is attested at the site from the late archaic era, and the latter from the Hellenistic period. (Note: Bourke, p. 33. Schachter 2000, p. 94 writes that the "Klytiadai came to prominence later than the Iamidai"; Bourke, p. 32 argues, contra Schachter and other scholars, that "we cannot say that one of the houses began to practise at the altar of Zeus before the other".) Olympia's seers often provided guidance on the battlefield, and during the 5th and 4th centuries BC the oracle was visited for its military advice. (Note: Barringer 2015, p. 24. On the two consultations described by ancient authors, see Parke, p. 186.) According to Pausanias, the seers were also responsible for looking after the ash altar. (Note: Sinn 2014, p. 128. For example, Pausanias, 5.13.11 (Jones 1926, pp. 456–457) relates that the seers would annually mix the ash from the site's prytaneion with water from the Alfeios river, and apply this paste to the altar's ash pile.)

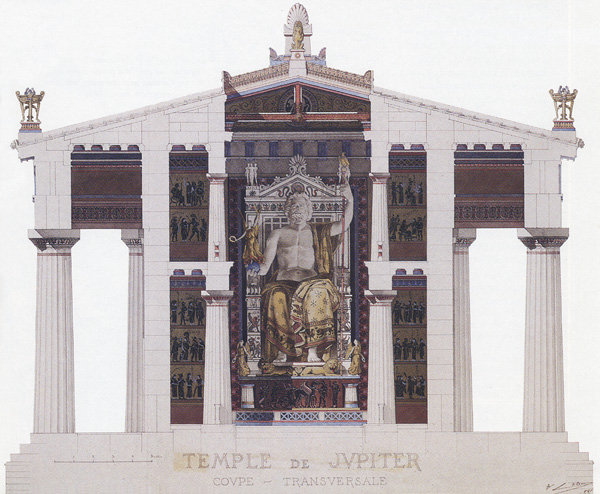
Artistic reconstruction of the Temple of Zeus at Olympia, by Victor Laloux (1883). It illustrates a cross-section of the cella, which contained the giant statue of Zeus by Phidias.

The Temple of Zeus was erected at the site around 470 to 456 BC. According to Pausanias, the polis of Elis constructed it from war booty attained in its defeat of nearby Pisa; scholars have disputed this account, though there is unanimity that its construction commemorated a military triumph. (Note: Barringer 2021, pp. 121–122; Pausanias, 5.10.2 (Jones 1926, pp. 530–531).) The temple's stylobate (the surface on which the columns stood) measured 27.68 by 64.12 metres (90.8 by 210.4 ft); the columns were around 10.53 metres (34.5 ft) tall, and the temple's full height would have been roughly 20 metres (66 ft). It was the largest temple in the Peloponnese, and is deemed the purest realisation of the Doric system of ancient Greek architecture. The temple's two pediments each depicted a mythological scene: the war between the centaurs and the Lapiths on the west pediment, and Pelops' chariot race against the Pisan king Oenomaus on the east pediment. (Note: Barringer 2005, pp. 214, 216; Barringer 2021, pp. 122, 124–125. Each of the temple's twelve metopes illustrated one of the twelve labours of Heracles (Barringer 2005, p. 214).)

Around 438 to 432 BC, the sculptor Phidias produced an enormous chryselephantine (gold and ivory) cult statue of Zeus, which measured around 13.5 metres (44 ft) in height. (Note: Tiverios et al., p. 327. For a discussion of the statue's size, see Lapatin, pp. 80–81 with n. 190.) It was the most famous statue of Zeus in antiquity, and came to be included among the Seven Wonders of the Ancient World. It showed him seated on a throne, with the goddess Nike in his right hand and an eagle-topped sceptre in his left. The statue is entirely lost, though literary descriptions and representations in later art survive. It was housed in the temple's cella (an enclosed inner area), (Note: Sinn 2000, p. 58. On the concept of a cella, see Höcker, para. 1.) which underwent modifications as part of the statue's installation.

Over fifty gods and heroes were worshipped at Olympia; the most important of these include Hera, Zeus's wife, and Cronus and Rhea, his parents. (Note: Larson 2007, p. 27. On the relation of these figures to Zeus in mythology, see Grimal, s.vv. Cronus, p. 115, Hera, p. 192, Rhea, p. 403.) Each month there was a procession through Olympia, during which sacrifices were made at each of its altars, which numbered 69 according to Pausanias. (Note: Mallwitz 1972, p. 19. Pausanias, 5.14.4–10 (Jones 1926, pp. 458–469).) Of these altars, at least eight were dedicated to Zeus under different epithets, such as Areios ('of Ares, warlike, martial, of war'), Keraunios ('of a thunderbolt'), and Chthonios ('of the underworld'). (Note: Larson 2007, p. 27. Some of the listed epithets have been taken from Schwabl 1972, p. 1093, who gives a longer list than Larson. For the translations used here, see Larson and Montanari, s.vv. Ἄρειος and αρείος, p. 292, κεραύνιος, p. 1116.) As Zeus Keraunios, he was affiliated with war; before and during the first half of the 5th century BC, representations of the god as Zeus Keraunios (that is, throwing a thunderbolt) seem to predominate at Olympia. (Note: Barringer 2015, p. 19. On the Zeus Keraunios type, see Henrichs & Bäbler, "V. Iconography", para. 1. Chrysoula Kardara argues that Zeus Areios is the figure in depictions of Zeus Keraunios from Olympia (Barringer 2015, p. 22).) He also appeared as an adjudicator: before a statue of Zeus Horkios ('of the oath'), (Note: For this translation, see Konstantinidou, p. 6.) which held two thunderbolts, Olympic athletes and trainers swore to compete fairly.

=== Dodona ===
Zeus's most renowned oracle was that at Dodona, a sanctuary situated below Mount Tomaros in the region of Epirus in north-western Greece. In antiquity, this oracle was reputed to be the most ancient in Greece. The site is securely attested as having a religious function by the late 8th century, and there is disagreement among scholars as to whether cultic activity there dates back to the Late Bronze Age (1700–1000 BC). (Note: Chapinal-Heras, pp. 24–25. For these dates, see Cline, p. xxxi.) From the 8th century BC, the sanctuary is known to have been dedicated to Zeus. Dodona is referenced in the Homeric epics – the Iliad and Odyssey – probably both composed in the late 8th or early 7th century BC. (Note: Oberhelman, p. 239; Chapinal-Heras, p. 28. For the date of the Homeric epics, see Affleck, p. 26.) In the Iliad, the Zeus of Dodona is addressed by the Greek hero Achilles as "Pelasgian", a label which connotes great age (and which the Greeks associated with the pre-Greek population). (Note: Chapinal-Heras, p. 28. On the Greeks' association of "Pelasgian" with the pre-Greek population, and on the relation of that meaning to this passage of the Iliad, see Fowler, pp. 87–88.) In place of Hera, Zeus's consort at Dodona was Dione, whose name is a feminine version of Zeus (which in the genitive case is Dios). (Note: Dakaris, p. 155; Dowden 2006, pp. 10–11. For "Dione" as a feminine form of "Zeus", see Hard, p. 80.) Zeus was venerated at the site under the epithet "Naios", which has elicited various scholarly interpretations, and Dione under the epithet "Naia" there. (Note: Kittelä, p. 32. For "Naios" as having been interpreted in various ways by scholars, see Bosman, p. 70; for a discussion of multiple such interpretations, see Chapinal-Heras, p. 105.)

Little is known about the operation of the oracle, and literary sources provide various accounts of the method of divination. The Iliad relates that the priests of Zeus at Dodona, whom it calls the selloi, sleep upon the ground and do not wash their feet. (Note: Tartaron, p. 21; Gartziou-Tatti, p. 175; Iliad 16.235 (Lattimore, p. 336).) In the Odyssey, the hero Odysseus claims that he visited Dodona where he listened to the will of Zeus via an oak tree. (Note: Kittelä, p. 239; Odyssey 14.370–372 (Fagles, p. 312).) According to the 5th-century BC historian Herodotus, there were three priestesses at Dodona, described as peleiádes (πελειάδες, 'doves'); (Note: Mylonopoulos, p. 199; Herodotus, Histories 2.55, 2.57 (Godley, pp. 342–345). For this form of the word and for this translation, see Montanari, s.v. πελειάς, p. 1606.) it appears that the selloi were the site's initial priesthood, with the peleiades appearing at some point. (Note: Chapinal-Heras, p. 103. Oberhelman, p. 239 writes that the priestesses "supplanted" the selloi, Lipka suggests that the selloi may have been "downgraded" at a certain point, and Chapinal-Heras, p. 104 believes that the two coexisted for several centuries, before the selloi's role was diminished.) Other writers convey that literal doves may have been involved, delivering oracles themselves or having their flight interpreted by priestesses. Archaeological evidence of the oracle's operation includes over two thousand lamellae (thin tablets) from the site, most of which bear inscribed questions asked of the oracle, with a few seemingly containing answers. (Note: Meyer, p. 20. On a small minority of the tablets as seemingly containing answers, see Parker 2016b, p. 71. Chapinal-Heras, p. 34 n. 225, explains that 4216, the figure reported by Meyer ("more than 4200"), is the number of inscriptions (rather than tablets) published in the 2013 edition of the inscriptions; the number of tablets is 1380, as one tablet could contain multiple inscriptions. González, pp. 204–205, writes that the tablets published in the 2013 edition were – in the view of its editors – roughly half of those that had been excavated, and that the excavations conducted up to 1959 had uncovered "more than two thousand" tablets.) Personal enquiries constitute the vast majority of these questions, and commonly pertain to topics such as marriage, offspring, travel, business, and health. The questions are seldom open-ended, and often require only a binary answer; a story attributed to the 4th-century BC historian Callisthenes describes oracular answers as being determined via the drawing of lots, and a handful of the tablets seemingly suggest the use of this method.

=== Nemea ===
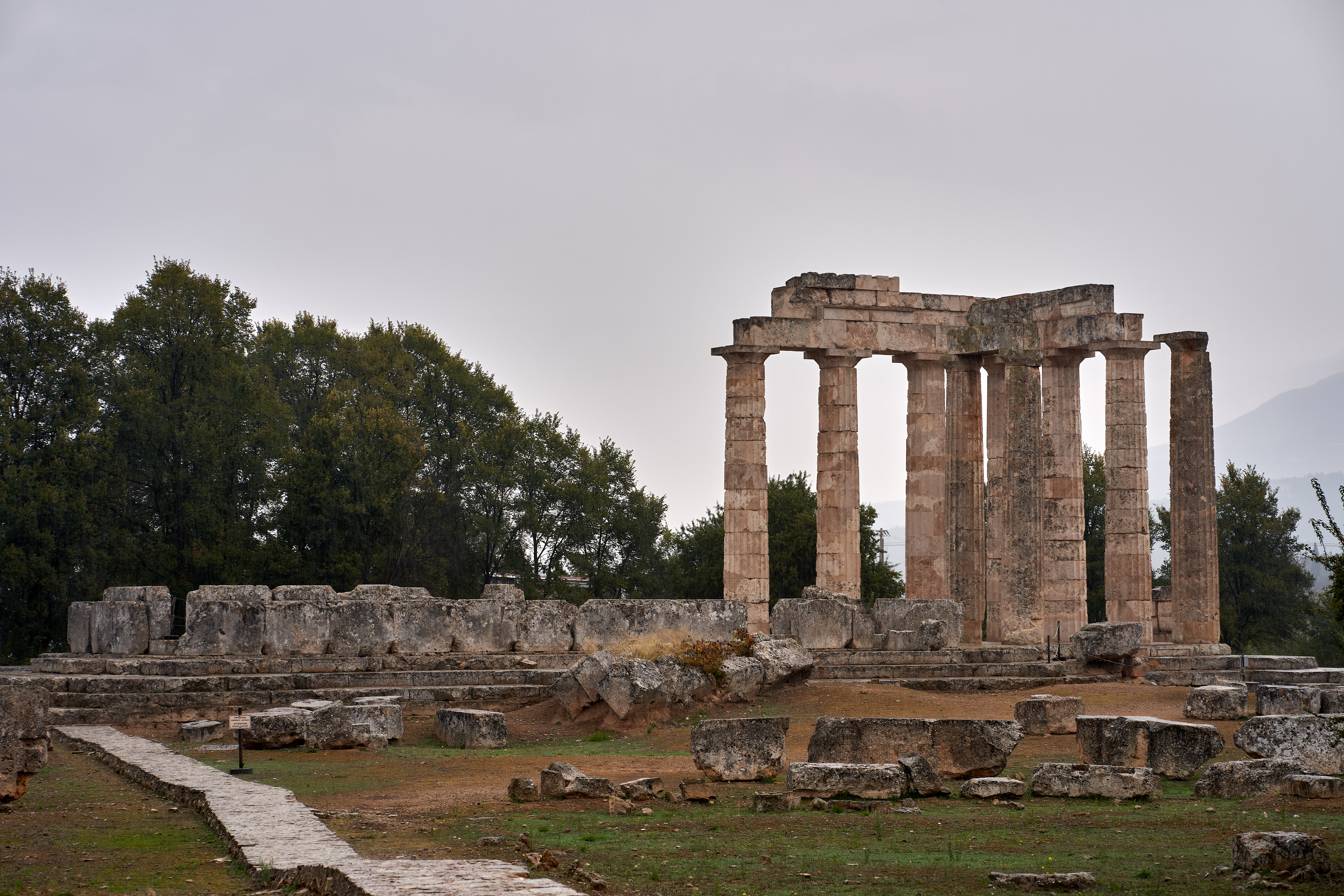
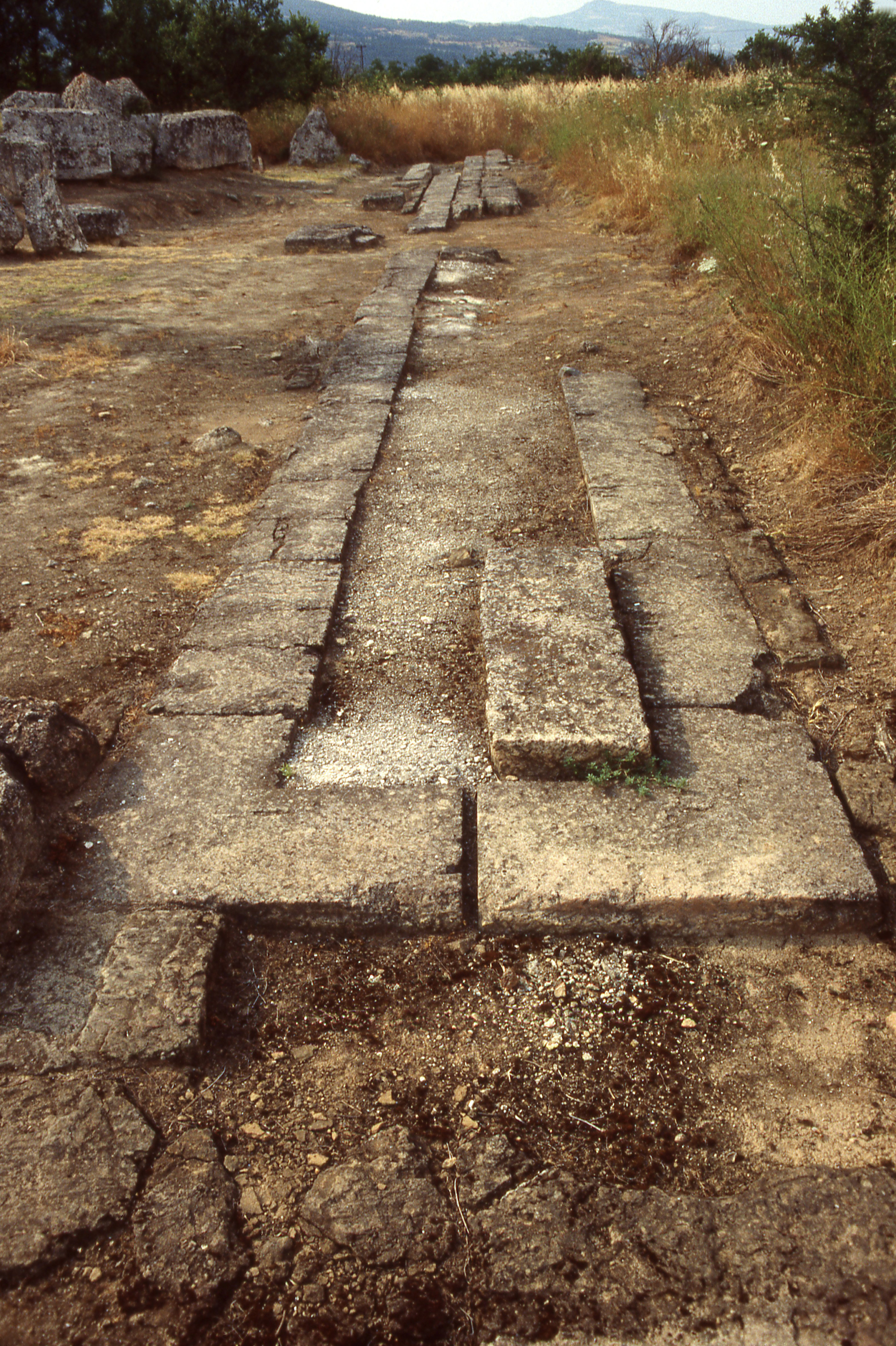
Remains of the Temple of Zeus (left) and the southern end of the altar (right) from his sanctuary at Nemea

Nemea was a valley in northwest Argolis, Peloponnese, and the location of the sanctuary of Zeus that hosted the Nemean Games, one of the four Panhellenic athletic festivals of ancient Greece. Archaeological finds, including sherds found close to the later Temple of Zeus, indicate some form of activity at the site as early as the 8th century BC. By the 6th century BC, the site was under the control of the nearby city of Cleonae, and in 573 BC, according to the traditional dating, the Nemean Games attained Panhellenic status. (Note: Bravo, p. 34; Stephen G. Miller 1990, p. 20. According to Shelton, "The Archaic Period", para. 1, this date is fairly congruent with archaeological findings, which reveal "a marked increase in related cult and votive artefacts from the first half of the 6th century BCE". For further discussion of this traditional date, see Bravo, p. 34 n. 99.) The Games were dedicated to Zeus Nemeios, were held biennially, and included gymnic and equestrian competitions, as well as musical events. In myth, they are established by Heracles after killing the Nemean lion, or founded as funeral games in honour of the child Opheltes, who was killed by a snake.

The Temple of Zeus was the centrepiece of the sanctuary, and its first iteration seems to have been constructed in the first half of the 6th century BC. (Note: Stella G. Miller, pp. 143. For an overhead plan and picture of the sanctuary, see Birge, Kraynak & Stephen G. Miller, pp. 2–3, figures 1–2.) The temple and numerous other structures at the site were destroyed in the late 5th century, after which the Games were held elsewhere (probably in Argos). They moved back to Nemea in the late 4th century BC, when the sanctuary was subject to a major construction program, which included the erection of a new Temple of Zeus and a stadium. This temple employed all three orders of ancient Greek architecture (the Doric, Ionic, and Corinthian), and contained a crypt within its adyton (the innermost area of an ancient Greek temple). (Note: Shelton, "The Hellenistic Period", para. 1; Abraldes, p. 133. This feature was also present in the temple built in the 6th century BC.) On the eastern side of the temple there was an especially long altar to Zeus, which at minimum measured 41 metres. It was created in the 6th century BC, and increased to its full length in the 4th century BC. Faunal remains indicate the sacrifice of sheep, goats, and (ostensibly) cattle there. The Games had returned to Argos by 271 BC, and over the following centuries the site was abandoned, with Pausanias reporting in the 2nd century AD that the temple's roof had fallen in. (Note: Shelton, "Late Roman to Medieval", para. 1; Pausanias, 2.15.2–3 (Jones 1918, pp. 324, 325).)

== Attica ==
Multiple mountains in Attica were locations of Zeus's cult. His sanctuary on Mount Hymettos is attested as early as the Protogeometric period (c. 1025–900), and excavations have uncovered inscriptions to Zeus on its summit. Pausanias mentions an altar to Zeus Ombrios ('of rain') on the mountain; (Note: Schwabl 1972, p. 1072; Pausanias, 1.32.2 (Jones 1918, pp. 172–173). For this translation, see Parker 1996, p. 31. Pausanias also mentions a statue of Zeus Hymettios there (Langdon, p. 96). He references Parnes and Anchesmos in the same passage.) Merle Langdon argues that this altar can be identified with the excavated site at the peak, which, in his view, farmers would have visited to make offerings, primarily for rain. There is evidence of a sanctuary of Zeus on Mount Parnes from the 10th or 9th century BC, and Pausanias mentions several of his altars near its peak. According to Langdon, there was also a sanctuary of Zeus on Tourkovounia (which he identifies with Anchesmos, mentioned by Pausanias). In the classical period, activity at the god's Attic mountaintop sanctuaries waned. (Note: Larson 2007, p. 27. According to Parker 1996, p. 30, "none seems to have been regularly visited beyond the early Hellenistic period".)

Within Athens, on the Acropolis, there was a sanctuary of Zeus Polieus ('of the city'), (Note: Lambrinoudakis, Sgouleta & Petrounakos, p. 323. For this translation, see Larson 2007, p. 19.) whom scholars have characterised as the protector of the city. (Note: Lebreton 2015, para. 1. For example, see Burkert 1985, p. 184, who calls him the "guardian of the city". Lebreton 2015, paras. 2–3, however, argues that this meaning is "not self-evident", and sees the term as polysemic.) Most scholars have identified this precinct with an area to the northeast of the Parthenon (Athena's temple on the Acropolis), containing the citadel's vertex, a shrine with a cella, and an offering table. (Note: Hurwit, pp. 190–191. This area shows evidence of development in two periods in the 5th century BC (Lebreton 2015, para. 6).) The Dipolieia festival to Zeus Polieus took place on the 14th day of Skirophorion, the final month of the Athenian year, and included a ritual known as the Buphonia ('ox-killing'). (Note: Sehlmeyer, para. 1; Parker 2005, pp. 187–188 with n. 45. On Skirophorion as the final month in the Athenian year, see Burkert 1983, p. 143.) In this rite, offerings of grain were placed at the god's altar on the Acropolis, and the first among a group of oxen to eat from these offerings, thereby violating them, was slaughtered. The priest who performed the killing absconded, and the sacrificial knife (or axe) was convicted in court, then deposited in the sea. (Note: Burkert 2001, p. 91. For the axe as the sacrificial weapon in an alternative version, see Parker 2005, p. 5. Each person at the trial would shift the blame to another individual, until it was placed on the weapon (Auffarth, para. 1).) This rite is described as antiquated already by Aristophanes (5th to 4th centuries BC), though is still attested in Pausanias's time (2nd century AD). (Note: Parker 2005, p. 188; Aristophanes, The Clouds 984 (Henderson, pp. 142–145); Pausanias, 1.24.4 (Jones 1918, pp. 122–123).) Walter Burkert views the ritual as one of "dissolution" near the end of the year, where humans attempted to escape the "horror of killing". According to Robert Parker, at the rite's centre is man's exonerating himself from the "guilt of sacrifice", with the ox incurring culpability by consuming offerings and the weapon assigned guilty in court. Sacrifices to Zeus Polieus are also recorded on the calendars of the Attic demes (or districts) of Erchia and Thorikos.

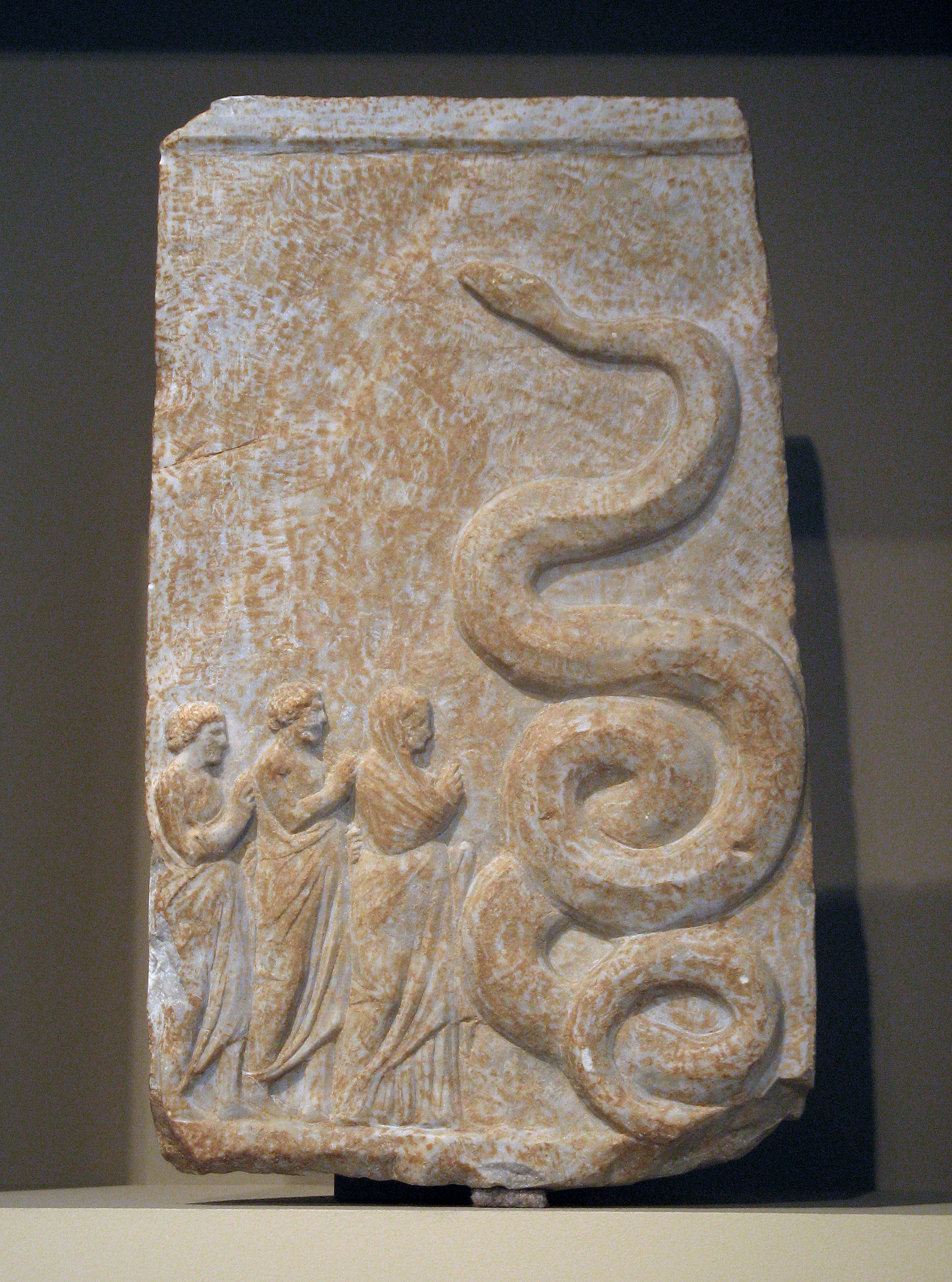
A 4th-century BC Athenian votive relief dedicated to Zeus Meilichios

The Diasia festival was dedicated to Zeus Meilichios ('the mild'), (Note: Henrichs & Bäbler, "IV. Rites, cults, festivals", para. 1. For this translation, see Larson 2007, p. 21.) whose name was euphemistic, used as a way of appeasing him. Scholars have often classed him among the chthonic deities, (Note: Parker 2016a, para. 3. According to Parker 2015a, para. 3, he is included in this category as a figure "not explicitly associated with the earth but [who shares] characteristics with those which are".) and he was often depicted on votive reliefs as a giant serpent. The festival took place on the 23rd day of the month of Anthesterion, outside the city in the deme of Agrae. Thucydides (5th century BC) called it the "greatest Athenian festival of Zeus", (Note: Graf 2015, para. 9; Thucydides, 1.126.6 (Smith, pp. 210–211). For a discussion of this phrase used by Thucydides, see Lalonde, p. 108 n. 15. Further information mentioned from Thucydides about the Diasia comes from this passage.) and describes it as celebrated en masse (pandēmeí, πανδημεί), though Parker writes that it is unclear whether all Attic demes participated. Thucydides mentions it as including local offerings, which would have been bloodless and wineless, though the sacrifice of animals is evidenced by two Attic calendars. Scholia on Lucian (marginal notes in his works' manuscripts) described it as carried out "with a certain grimness", (Note: Parker 2005, p. 425; Scullion, p. 192; Scholia on Lucian's Icaromenippus 24, Timon, or the Misanthrope 7 (Rabe, pp. 107, 110).) though other ancient authors presented it as a cheerful event. Zeus Meilichios was also the dedicatee of the Athenian Pompaia festival, which featured a purification ritual in which a procession carried the fleeces of sacrificed sheep and a caduceus.

In the northwest part of the Athenian agora, there was a stoa, a long, roofed colonnade with a rear wall, dedicated to Zeus Eleutherios ('of freedom'). (Note: Rosivach, p. 262. For this translation, see Larson 2007, p. 20. On stoas, see Höcker, para. 1.) It was constructed around 430 to 420 BC, and outside its front sat an altar and statue of the god. There is evidence under the stoa of a structure dating to the 6th century BC, which was destroyed in the Persian invasion of 480 to 479 BC, (Note: Camp, p. 75. According to Rosivach, p. 38, the altar was used in connection with the older structure; it was not destroyed as part of the invasion, and its use continued as part of the cult related to the stoa.) and would have been dedicated to Zeus. In the agora, the cult of Zeus Eleutherios was the same as that of Zeus Soter ('the saviour'), (Note: Raaflaub, p. 108. For this translation, see Parker 1996, pp. 238–239.) though there are some differences in how ancient sources use the two names. Kurt Raaflaub argues that the recipient of the early structure in the agora was Zeus Soter, who attained the epithet Eleutherios following the Persian Wars. (Note: Raaflaub, p. 108. Suk Fong Jim, p. 37 contends that there is no certain evidence of either epithet in the agora before the 4th century BC, and argues that, with the extant evidence, we cannot definitely place the two relative to each other in time.) Another Zeus Soter, different to that of the agora, was jointly honoured with Athena Soteira in a temple in the Attic harbour town of Piraeus. His cult in the town is attested by the early 4th century BC, and mostly serviced individual worshippers hoping to be "saved" from personal problems, attracting visitors from Attica and abroad. His joint festival with Athena Soteira, the Diisoteria, centred around a procession to their temple. (Note: Henrichs & Bäbler, "IV. Rites, cults, festivals", para. 4 (joint festival); Parker 1996, p. 240 (centring around procession).)

== Crete ==
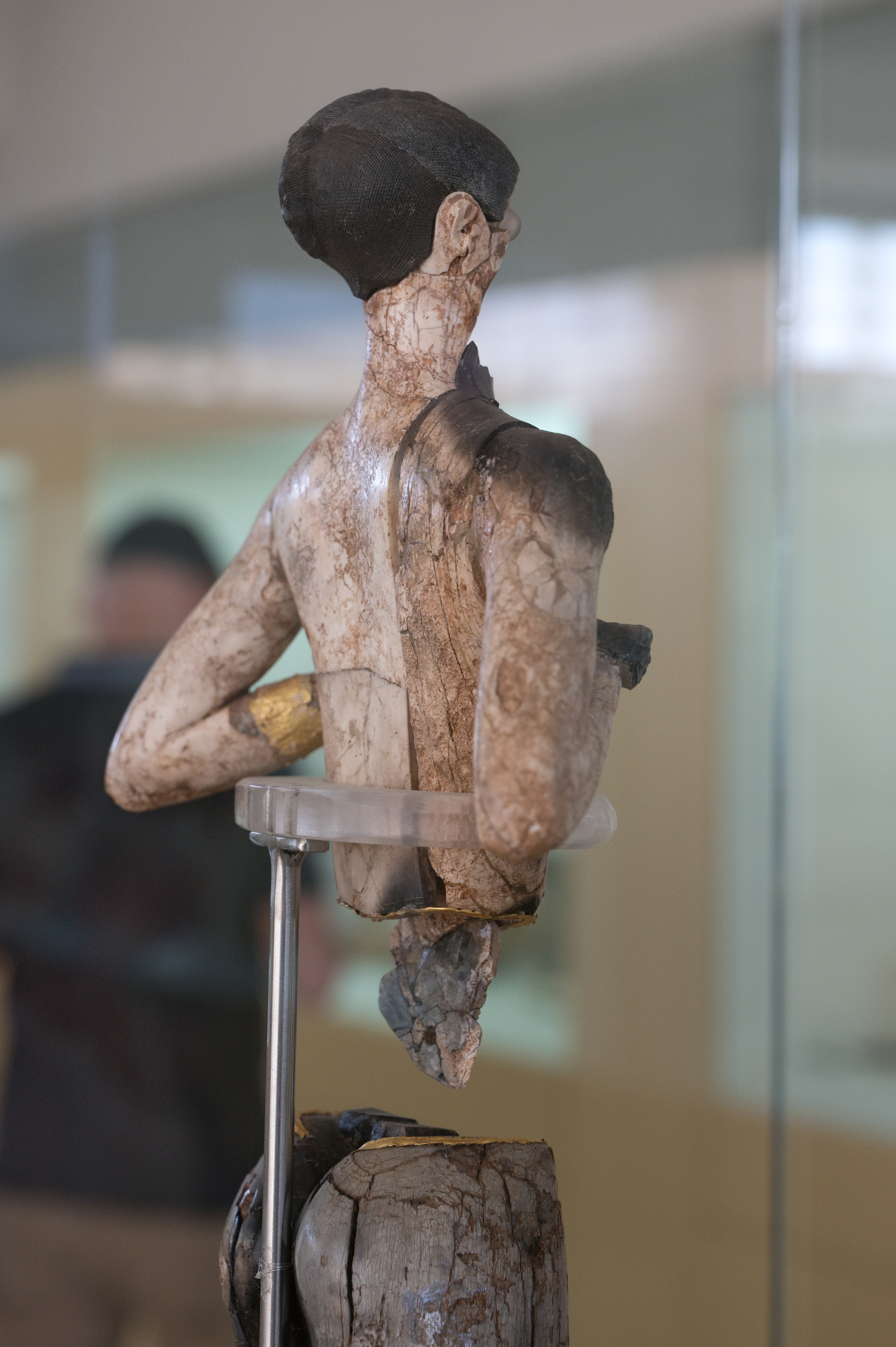
Upper half of the Palaikastro Kouros, a 15th-century BC chryselephantine statuette of a male youth

The foremost deity of eastern Crete was Zeus Diktaios. Most scholars agree that this was the god honoured in a sanctuary at Palaikastro (at the eastern end of Crete), constructed in the 8th century BC on the remains of a Minoan town. At the site, a section of wall measuring 36 metres (118 ft) has been considered a segment of a temenos's boundary. The sanctuary was the site of open-air worship – the nexus of which was an ash altar – until the 6th century BC, during which a temple was probably erected. Votive offerings discovered at the site, which include bronze tripods, shields, and bull statuettes, indicate that it flourished between the 7th and 5th centuries BC. (Note: Larson 2007, p. 25. On the votive offerings found at the site, see Sporn, p. 45.) The Hymn to Zeus Diktaios, also known as the Hymn of the Kouretes, is the most important discovery from the site; (Note: Sporn, p. 46. For the latter name, see Sideri, p. 167.) the original text of the hymn, often dated to the 4th or 3rd century BC, was preserved in an inscription from around the 3rd century AD. (Note: Furley & Bremer 2001b, p. 4 (text: 4th century BC; inscription: 3rd century AD); Brulé, p. 253 (text: late 4th to early 3rd century BC; inscription: c. 200 AD); Perlman 1995, p. 161 (text: late 4th to early 3rd century BC; inscription: 2nd to 3rd century AD). Prent 2003, p. 96 places the original hymn's date between the 6th and 4th centuries BC.) It addresses Zeus as the "greatest youth" (mégistos koûros, μέγιστος κοῦρος) and asks him to come to his sanctuary for an annual festival which included the singing of the hymn around his altar. (Note: Kreutz, p. 131. The hymn does not explicitly name Zeus, though Furley and Bremer write that his status as its addressee is "beyond reasonable doubt" (Furley & Bremer 2001b, p. 5). The hymn requests the god's presence at "Dikte"; according to Crowther, it is "clear" that "Dikte" here refers to the sanctuary itself (Crowther 2000, p. 146).) The hymn is also concerned with fertility, requesting that the god "leap into" (thór' es, θόρ' ἐς) fields, flocks, herds, and offspring-filled homes. (Note: Perlman 1995, pp. 161–162. Other translations of θόρ' ἐς have included 'leap for', 'hasten', and 'spring up into'; on which scholars have favoured each translation, see Perlman 1995, p. 162 with n. 10.)

Found amongst the remains of the Minoan town was a 15th-century BC chryselephantine statuette, known as the Palaikastro Kouros, depicting a male youth and measuring 0.5 metres (1.6 ft) in height. (Note: Prent 2005, p. 543. For the 15th-century date, see Prent 2003, p. 96.) He has clenched fists, raised towards his chest, a stance also displayed by figurines from nearby Mount Pesofas, where there was a peak sanctuary. The statuette's subject is almost certainly a deity, and Alexander MacGillivray and Hugh Sackett interpret him as Zeus Diktaios. (Note: MacGillivray & Sackett, p. 169. Furley & Bremer 2001a, p. 71 write that "there can hardly be any doubt" that its subject is a deity.) The Palaikastro Kouros may indicate there was a Minoan forerunner to Zeus Diktaios's archaic and classical cult, (Note: Crowther 2000, p. 147. Zeus Diktaios and Dikte are also attested on several Linear B tablets from Knossos; on the tablet which mentions Zeus Diktaios, see § Mycenaean Greece and continuity.) although continuity of worship is not indicated by the archaeological evidence.

Crete is the location most often given as Zeus's birthplace, appearing in this role as early as around 700 BC in the Theogony of Hesiod. The location of his birth on Crete was a matter of disagreement in antiquity: it was said to be a cave on either Mount Dikte or Mount Ida. (Note: Hard, p. 75; Larson 2001, p. 185. The exception is Hesiod, who places his birth on Mount Aegaeon (Hard, pp. 74–75).) There is a consensus in modern scholarship that Dikte is located in eastern Crete, and Charles Crowther identifies it with Mount Petsofas in particular. There is also agreement that Zeus Diktaios was a form of the Cretan-born Zeus, known as Zeus Kretagenes, and the hymn from Palaikastro displays awareness of a tradition in which Zeus's upbringing takes place on Dikte. (Note: Robertson, p. 41. The poem describes him as Rhea's child, delivered to Dikte; the identity of the recipient is unclear, owing to the text's fragmentary nature.) Zeus was also said to have died in Crete, a tradition unique to the island, with ancient authors variously locating his grave at Knossos, Mount Ida, and Mount Dikte. Some scholars have argued that a chasm in the peak sanctuary on Mount Juktas, near Knossos, was considered a burial site of Zeus in antiquity. (Note: Bloedow, p. 162; Karetsou, p. 153. Bloedow, pp. 164–165 argues that the sanctuary was the site of the cult of the Cretan Zeus. According to Postlethwaite, p. 89 and Kokolakis, p. 125, there are no extant sources from antiquity which describe Mount Juktas as the site of Zeus's burial. On the location of Mount Juktas, see Karetsou, p. 137.)

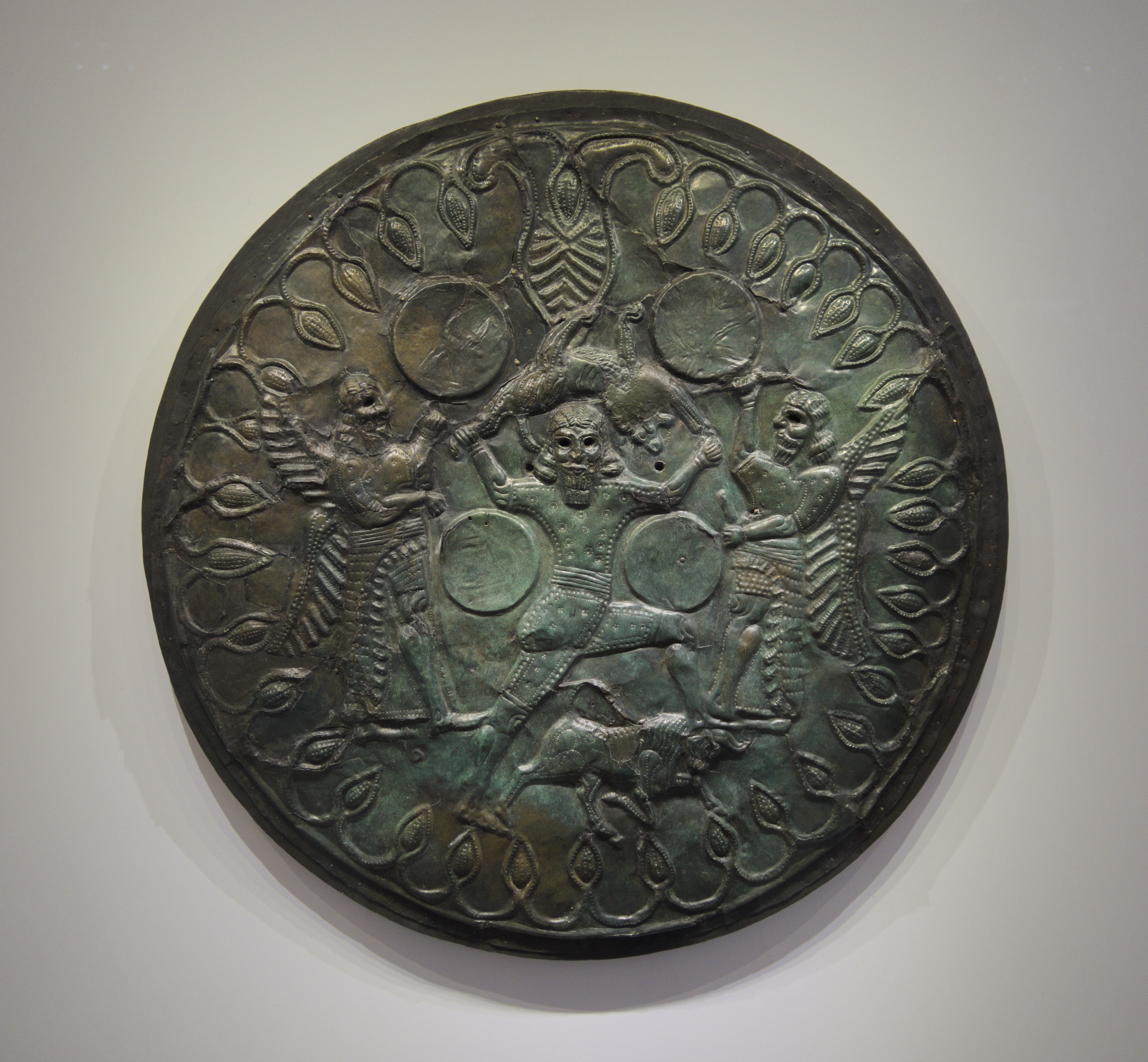
A bronze tympanon from the cave on Mount Ida, dating to the late 8th or early 7th century BC, depicting Zeus in a style which indicates Near Eastern influence

Zeus was venerated for over 1000 years in a cave on Mount Ida, situated in central Crete. Religious activity is attested at the site as early as the Middle Minoan period's end (c. 1700–1675), (Note: Vikela, p. 203; Sakellarakis 1988b, p. 173. For these dates, see Manning, p. 23, Table 2.2.) and Yannis Sakellarakis believes the Cretan Zeus was honoured there by the Late Minoan III period (c. 1420/1410–1075/1050), following the worship of a Minoan god of vegetation. (Note: Prent 2005, p. 160, citing Sakellarakis 1987, p. 247. Perlman 2010, p. 93 writes that there is "general agreement" this had happened by the Early Iron Age (for which she gives the dates 970–630 BC). Prent 2005, p. 603 considers it likely that a "fusion" occurred between the two in the Late Bronze Age (c. 1700–1000 BC). For these dates, see Manning, p. 23, Table 2.2 and Cline, p. xxxi.) The cave's entrance is 25 metres (82 ft) in width, and its interior comprises a main room, the maximum measurements of which are 36 by 34 metres (118 by 112 ft) with a height of 17 metres (56 ft), and two recesses; (Note: Sapouna, p. 16; Prent 2005, p. 159. For a schematic of the cave, see Rutkowski, p. 50, figure 44.) outside the entrance is an altar, hewn from stone. Ranging from the Middle Minoan period to the 5th century AD, finds from the site include bronze shields, bronze tripods, figurines of animals and humans, lamps, pottery, jewellery, and various other gold, ivory, and bronze items; there survive a profusion of votive offerings, which become markedly more numerous during the 8th and 7th centuries BC. Animals were sacrificed inside the cave, as evidenced by the presence of bones and black earth. (Note: Sakellarakis 1988a, p. 210. A treaty dating to around 500 BC required the city of Rhizenia to biennially supply sacrificial animals to Ida (Chaniotis 2009, p. 62).)

The cult at the Idaean cave drew worshippers from numerous communities, and multiple Cretan cities played an official role in its operation. Coins from the cave, originating from various Cretan cities, indicate the site's influence across the island, and Zeus Idatas (or Idaean Zeus) appears in Cretan treaties. (Note: Chaniotis 1988, pp. 34–35. On Zeus Idatas as Idaean Zeus, see Prent 2005, p. 737.) The site was known outside Crete by the classical period, being referenced by authors such as Pindar, Euripides, and Plato; it was also said to have been visited by the philosopher Pythagoras. Scholars have variously conceived of the cult as concerning vegetation or initiation rites (of warriors or young men), and Angelos Chaniotis argues the cave was the site of an oracle. A fragment from Euripides' lost play Cretans, dating to the late 5th century BC, refers to "mústai of Idaean Zeus", and some scholars have seen the cave as the site of mysteries. (Note: Prent 2005, pp. 593, 599. This is the only attestation of mysteries as part of the Zeus's cult in Greece (Casadio, p. 283). Prent 2005, p. 599 writes that a "mystic character" is "suggested" by the Euripidean fragment, and Casadio characterises the conclusion from the fragment that mysteries were practised as "difficult to dispute".)

At Amnisos, a settlement along Crete's northern coast, there was a sanctuary dedicated to Zeus Thenatas. (Note: Sonnabend, para. 1. The name "Thenatas" comes from Thenae, where, during the transportation of the newborn Zeus, the umbilical cord was sometimes said to have fallen (Chaniotis & Schäfer, p. 353).) It seems to have been the site of an ash altar, and epigraphic evidence indicates the god's worship at the sanctuary in the Hellenistic period; (Note: Prent 2005, pp. 334–336. According to Prent, the ash altar cannot be dated with certainty.) Chaniotis and Jörg Schäfer believe his cult there dates to at least the 8th century BC. At the site of Hagia Triada, near Phaistos, Zeus Velchanos was worshipped during the Hellenistic period; the name Velchanos is inscribed on late-4th-century BC coins from Phaistos, depicting a young deity without a beard, perched in a tree. (Note: Sporn, pp. 202–203. Hesychius writes that Velchanos was a Cretan deity with whom Zeus was identified (Sporn, p. 203). Inscriptions from multiple Cretan cities mention a festival dedicated to this god, held in spring (Willetts 1962, p. 250).)

== Arcadia ==
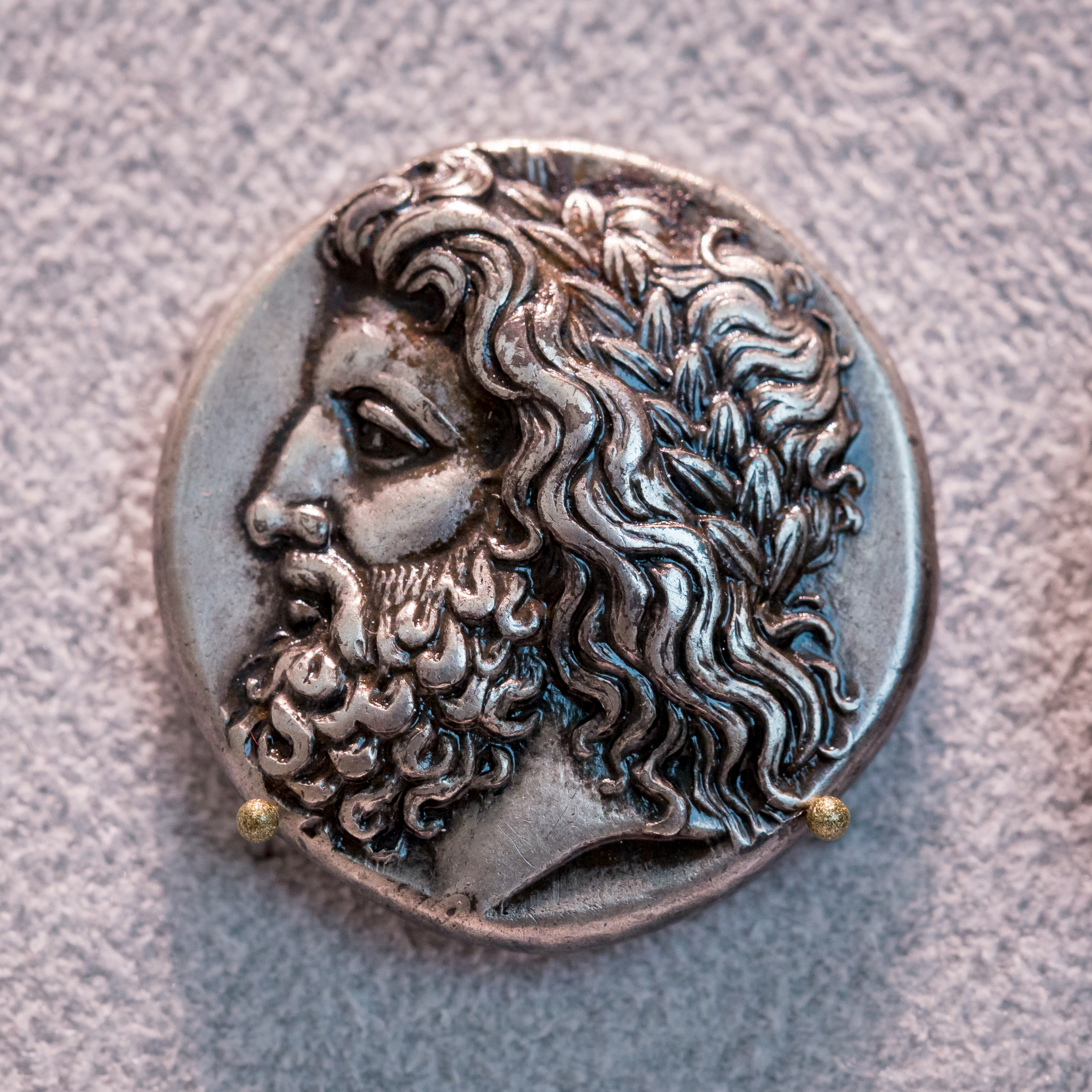
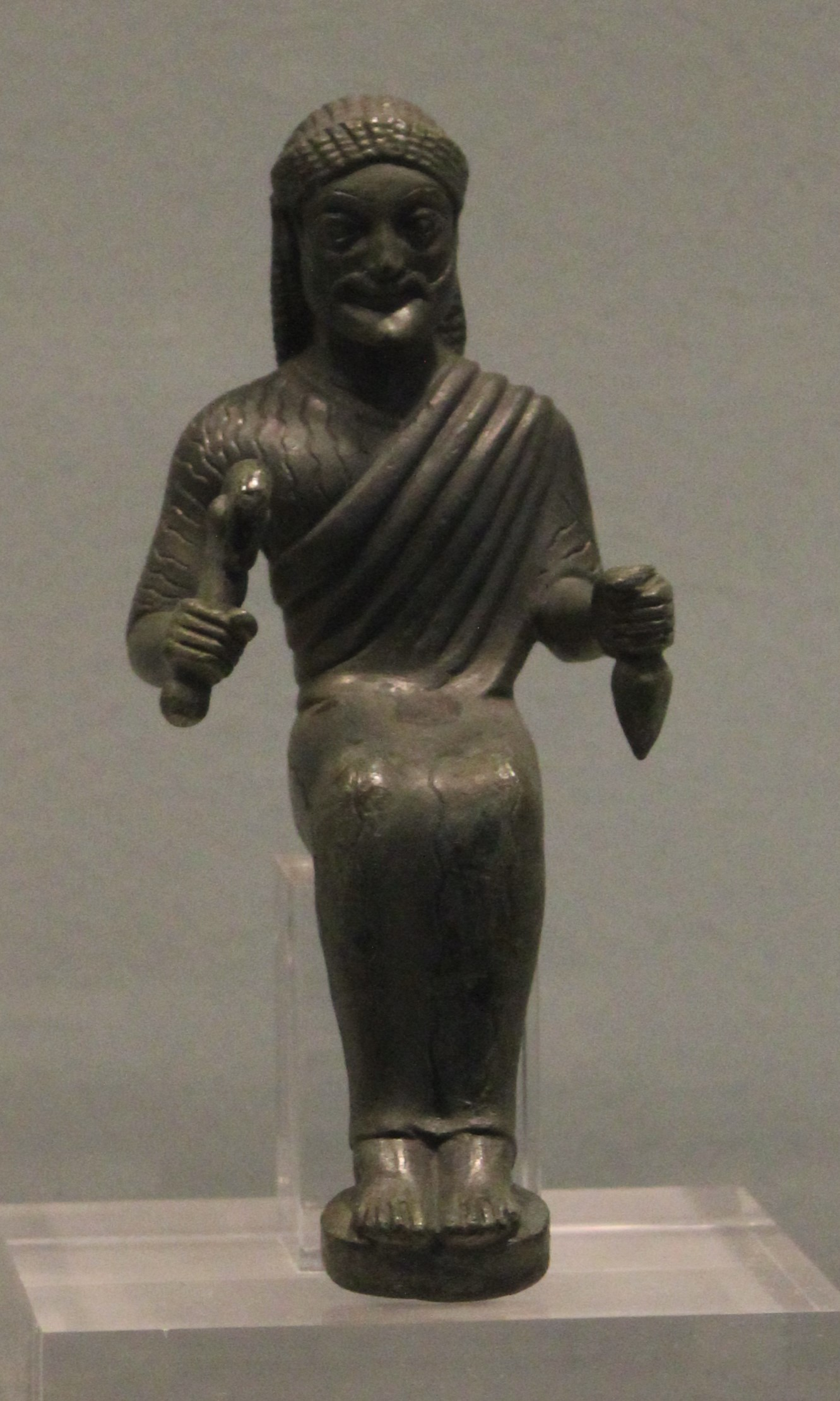
Zeus Lykaios depicted on an Arcadian coin, c. 363–362 BC, and in the form of a statuette (discovered on Mount Lykaion, near the column bases), holding a thunderbolt and crook, c. 540–530 BC

There was a sanctuary of Zeus on the southern peak of Mount Lykaion in western Arcadia, on which he was worshipped under the epithet Lykaios. (Note: Kruse, p. 2244. The etymology of Lykaîos (Λυκαῖος), the nature of Zeus Lykaios, and whether he should be considered a "wolf god" or a "light god", were matters of disagreement in the late 19th and early 20th centuries (Hughes, pp. 102 with nn. 95–97). For a modern source on the matter, see Ogden, pp. 176–177.) The mountain is described by Callimachus (3rd century BC) and Pausanias as the god's birthplace, (Note: Romano 2019a, p. 221; Romano & Voyatzis 2014, pp. 571, 573.) and his cult there was said to have been established by Lycaon, son of the mythical first Arcadian king, Pelasgus. During the archaic and classical periods, the site was the foremost Arcadian sanctuary: Zeus Lyaios is depicted on Arcadian coinage during the 5th and 4th centuries BC, and Xenophon (5th to 4th centuries BC) reports that the Arcadians of the Ten Thousand celebrated the Lykaia (the festival held on Mount Lykaion) while in Peltae, Asia Minor. (Note: Jost 2007, p. 266.)

At the summit of Mount Lykaion is an altar in the form of a mound, measuring 1.5 metres (4.9 ft) in height and 30 metres (98 ft) in diameter. (Note: Jost 1985, p. 180; Romano & Voyatzis 2014, p. 575. According to Mentzer, Romano & Voyatzis, p. 1040, in the past the altar would have been greater in size than it is today.) Excavations indicate that it is composed of burned animal bones (primarily those of sheep and goats), ash, pottery, and votive offerings such as ceramic figurines and bronze tripods. (Note: Romano & Voyatzis 2021, p. 4. On the animals sacrificed at the Romano 2019a, p. 227; Romano & Voyatzis 2014, p. 614.) These finds evince the altar's usage continuously from Mycenaean times to the Hellenistic period. (Note: Romano & Voyatzis 2021, p. 4. Given its antiquity and similar ash altar, David Romano and Mary Voyatzis argue the cult on Mount Lykaion influenced the creation of that at Olympia, located 35 kilometres (22 mi) to the northwest (Romano & Voyatzis 2021, pp. 1, 20–24).)

At an elevation approximately 20 metres (66 ft) below the peak is a temenos (or precinct), a level area bounded by stones and measured in the 20th century at 55 by 120 metres (180 by 394 ft). Pausanias described this space as an abaton (a sacred area to which entry was prohibited), (Note: Romano & Voyatzis 2014, p. 577. On the concept of an abaton, see Chaniotis 2002, para. 1.) claiming that those who set foot there perished within a year, and that inside its bounds all living beings lacked a shadow. (Note: Kreutz, pp. 123–124; Jost 1985, p. 255; Pausanias, 8.38.6 (Jones 1935, pp. 92–95). On the other references to the abaton by ancient authors, see Jost 1985, pp. 255–256.) Around the eastern end of the temenos are two column bases, 7 metres (23 ft) apart, which are the remains of 5th-century Doric columns said by Pausanias to have been topped with golden eagles. (Note: Jost 1985, p. 181; Pausanias, 8.38.7 (Jones 1935, pp. 94–95).) Items excavated in the vicinity of the column bases include bronze statuettes, several of which depict Zeus, an askos (perhaps used at the site for libations), and a votive greave.

From at least the 5th century BC, the Lykaia festival was held on Mount Lykaion, on either a biennial or quadrennial basis. It took place in a part of the sanctuary at an elevation 200 metres (660 ft) below the altar, in a meadow which contained a hippodrome, stadium, and other structures. The festival was dedicated to Zeus, and included athletic and equestrian competitions. It was hosted by Mount Lykaion up to the late 4th century BC, after which it may have moved to Megalopolis; evidence for the festival over the following centuries is patchy. Between the meadow and the peak lay a spring, Hagno. Pausanias described a ritual performed there to bring rain during protracted droughts: the priest of Zeus Lykaios would make prayers and sacrifices, and then disturb the water's surface with an oak branch, causing a vapour to rise and form clouds. (Note: Pausanias, 8.38.4 (Jones 1935, pp. 92–93).)

In antiquity, Mount Lykaion was reputed to be the site of human sacrifice. (Note: Hughes, p. 96. For a more complete collection of references related to this alleged human sacrifice, see Ogden, pp. 178–181.) The earliest reference to this idea comes from Plato's Republic (4th century BC), which mentions a legend (mûthos, μῦθος) that, at the sanctuary of Zeus Lykaios, human entrails were mixed into the meat meal (eaten after a sacrifice in Greek religion), (Note: On this, see Burkert 1985, p. 57.) and that he who consumed them was transformed into a wolf; the presence of the entrails in the meal implies that a human was part of the sacrifice. (Note: Bonnechere, Chapter I, paras. 128–129; Jost 1985, p. 258; Plato, Republic 565d–e (Emlyn-Jones & Preddy, pp. 288–291).) Other 4th-century BC sources mention human sacrifice as part of the Lykaia, and Pausanias (2nd century AD) is reticent about the rites carried out on the altar during his time. (Note: Pirenne-Delforge, Chapter IV, paras. 102–104; Borgeaud, pp. 38–39; Kreutz, p. 124; Pausanias, 8.2.3 (Jones 1933, pp. 350, 351).) Pliny the Elder (1st century AD) relates a tale of an Olympian, Demaenetus, who became a wolf for ten years after eating the innards of a child sacrificed to Zeus Lykaios. (Note: Kreutz, pp. 124–125; Pliny the Elder, 8.82 (Rackham, pp. 60–61) [= FGrH 413 F1]. On the identity of Pliny's source, see Ogden, p. 182. The same story is given by Pausanias, who names the athlete as Damarchus (Jost 1985, p. 159), and most scholars consider the two figures identical (Eidinow 2019, p. 68 n. 15).) In some versions of the myth of Lycaon, Zeus is presented by Lycaon with a meal of human flesh, prompting the god to turn him into a wolf (although sometimes the transgressors are Lycaon's sons). (Note: Jost 2007, pp. 274–275. This myth was found in some form in a work attributed to Hesiod (8th to 7th centuries BC) (Ogden, p. 167).) This story is an aetiology for the Lykaia, and in Pausanias's telling the transformation occurs after sacrificing a child on Zeus Lykaios's altar. (Note: Bonnechere, Chapter IV, para. 132.)

In the ancient literary evidence, Burkert perceives an initiation rite for young men, which would have taken place on Mount Lykaion, and involved those who ate (or perhaps were thought to eat) human entrails at the sacrificial meal leaving society for nine years. He argues that, after the founding of Megalopolis in 371 BC, the Lykaia would have moved to that city, and the rite held at Mount Lykaion would have "civilised" to a degree, and become restricted to a single family. Richard Buxton contends that nine years seems an overly lengthy duration for an initiation ritual, (Note: Buxton, p. 72. Jost 1985, p. 267 also takes issue with the period of nine years, as have others; see Ogden, p. 190 with n. 65.) and Madeleine Jost objects to the rite's confinement to one family on the basis that Pausanias does not suggest any sort of restriction on participation. (Note: Jost 1985, p. 260. Jost also protests that a piece of evidence important to Burkert's reconstruction (see Burkert 1983, pp. 87–88, 90–91), attributed to the Hellenistic author Evanthes, contains no reference to Mount Lykaion, and "may very well" pertain to another location in Arcadia.) There has been disagreement among scholars as to the historicity of human sacrifice at the site; excavations of the ash altar in the 21st century, however, have not uncovered evidence of human remains, and according to Daniel Ogden, writing in 2021, "[i]n recent years a consensus has built against the reality of human sacrifice" at the site.

== Cults abroad ==
=== Magna Graecia ===
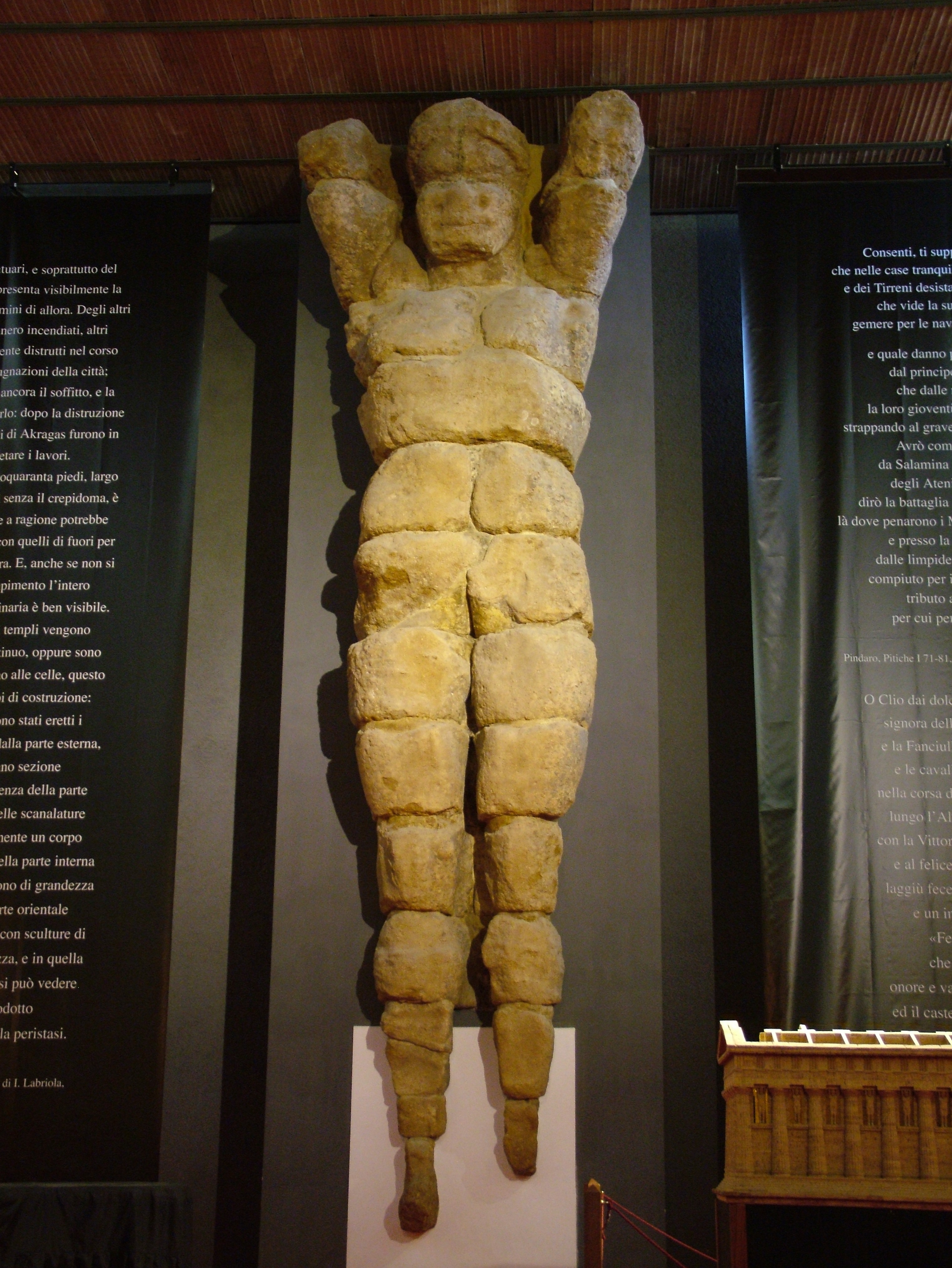
One of the atlantes which once sat between the columns of the Temple of Zeus Olympios at Acragas

The Temple of Zeus Olympios at the city of Acragas (modern-day Agrigento), in Sicily, was among the largest and most architecturally novel Greek temples. (Note: Winter, p. 143. It was also the largest temple of the Doric order (Bell, p. 359).) Its stylobate has been estimated to measure around 110.10 by 52.74 metres (361.2 by 173.0 ft), and was enclosed by walls lined with half columns. (Note: Kreutz, p. 99. Estimates vary; for a survey of the dimensions given by different scholars (and by Diodorus Siculus), see Vonderstein 2001, p. 43 n. 29, who writes that "reliable figures" do not exist.) Between these half columns sat atlantes, supports in the form of sculpted men, which were around 7.52 metres (24.7 ft) in height. The beginning of the building's construction is placed after 480 BC by most scholars, (Note: Van Compernolle, p. 54; Bell, p. 371. An alternative view holds that it was constructed in the late 6th century BC.) and Mirko Vonderstein argues the tyrant Theron sought to use it as a means of legitimising his rule, though by 406 BC the temple was still unfinished. Literary sources attest the existence of sanctuaries dedicated to Zeus Polieus and Zeus Atabyrius in Acragas.

Upon a hill at the Sicilian city of Selinunte, there were precincts dedicated to Zeus Meilichios and Demeter Malophoros, from which the oldest Greek evidence dates to the late 7th century BC. West of Zeus Meilichios's precinct was an area containing numerous stelae (blocks of stone bearing inscriptions or reliefs) and votive deposits, which included bones and figurines. This cult of Zeus Meilichios was familial in nature, and may have included the worship of male ancestors. A lex sacra (or sacred law), which has been dated to the mid-5th century BC, was inscribed on a tablet from Selinunte, possibly from the sanctuary of Zeus Meilichios. (Note: Jameson, Jordan & Kotansky, pp. ix, 5, 7, 48. Clinton, p. 165 argues against placing the tablet in this sanctuary.) It describes sacrifices to figures such as Zeus Eumenes and Zeus Meilichios, and a purificatory rite.

In the 6th century BC, a large Doric temple to Zeus Olympios was constructed along the Anapus river, outside the city of Syracuse. In 466 BC, upon the overthrow of the tyrant Thrasybulus, a cult to Zeus Eleutherios was instituted in the city, with games and an enormous statue of the god being created. Under the rule of Hiero II, a temple of Zeus Olympios was constructed in the agora which superseded the one outside the city, reflecting the tyrant's desire to be linked with the god.

=== Anatolia ===
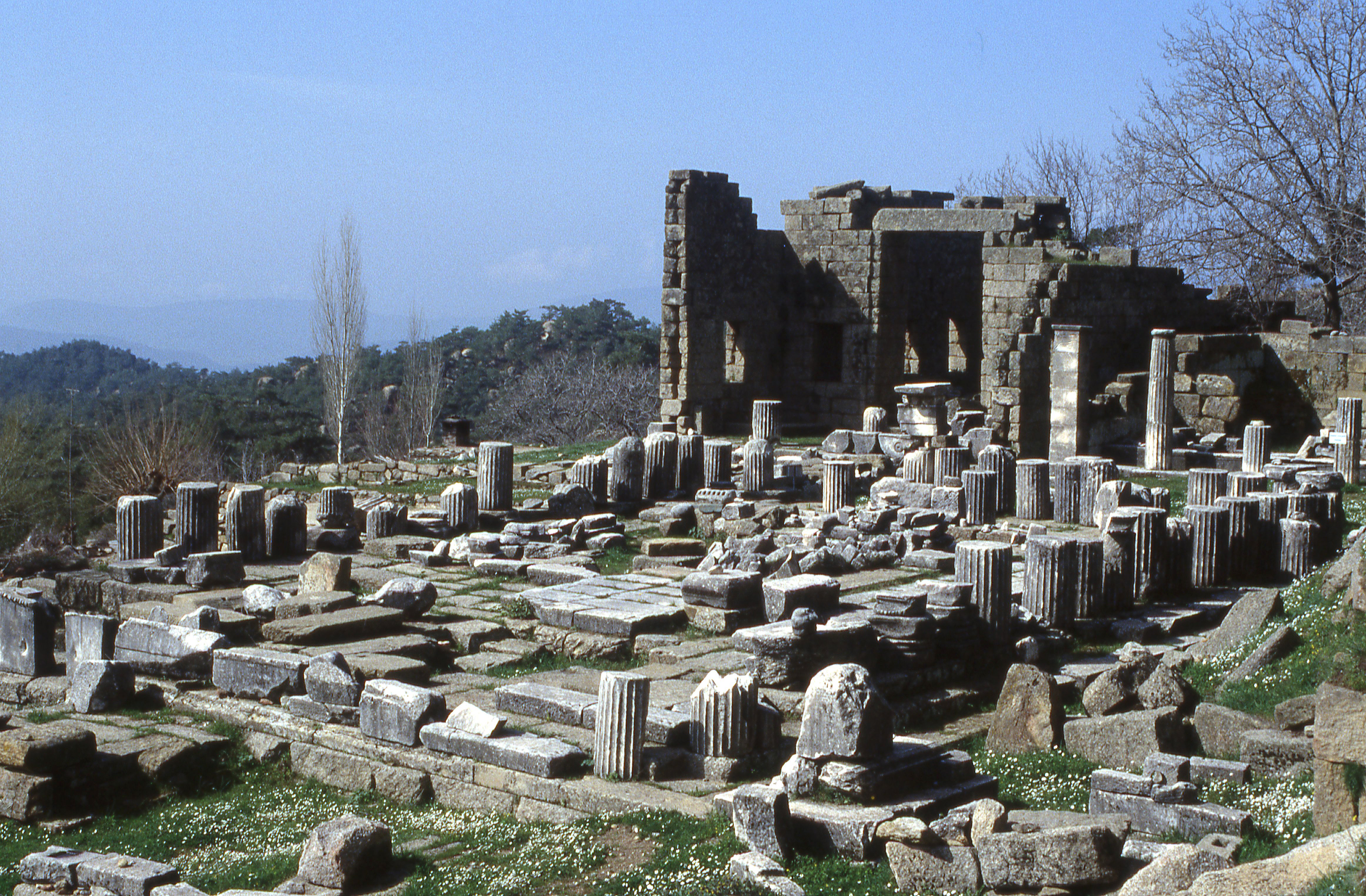
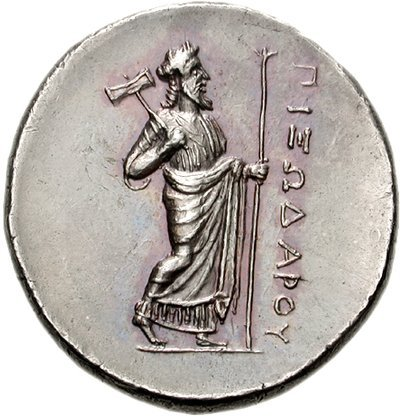
Remains of the temple of Zeus Labraundos at Labraunda (left) and Zeus Labraundos on a tetradrachm from Caria (right)

Zeus Labraundos was the recipient of a sanctuary at Labraunda, in a mountainous area near the city of Mylasa, in the region of Caria in Anatolia (modern-day Turkey). Probably during the late archaic period, a temple to Zeus Labraundos was built at the site. As part of a building program conducted in the 4th century BC by the Hecatomnids (the Achaemenid rulers of Caria), a new, Ionic temple was erected over the earlier structure, with two andrones (ritual banquet halls) built nearby. (Note: Hellström, paras. 2–3. For the construction of the new temple over the old one's foundations, see Williamson, p. 121.) An annual, one-day festival in honour of Zeus Labraundos was lengthened, most likely to five days, and allowed all Carians to participate. Zeus Labraunda, an amalgam of Greek and indigenous elements, was represented on Hecatomnid coinage and Mylasan altars, and had the double axe as his characteristic attribute. (Note: Williamson, pp. 155, 164–165. On Zeus Labraunda as incorporating Greek and indigenous elements, see Hornblower, para. 1.) The principal deity of Mylasa alongside Zeus Labraunda was Zeus Osogollis, whose sanctuary was situated to the city's south-west. (Note: Parker 2018, p. 38. On the sanctuary's location, see van Bremen 2016, p. 2.)

Atop a ridge near the Carian city of Stratonicea, there was a sanctuary dedicated to Zeus Karios ('of Caria') from at least the late 3rd century BC. (Note: van Bremen 2004, pp. 215–216, 218. From the 3rd century BC, it was under the control of the koinon of the Panamareis (Rivault, para. 1).) Stratonicea gradually gained control over the site, securing this hold by the late 2nd century BC. In 40 to 39 BC, the Roman general Quintus Labienus led Parthian troops into southern Anatolia; he attempted unsuccessfully to take Stratonicea, afterwards attacking Panamara, which was thought to be saved by an epiphany (or miraculous intervention) of Zeus. This prompted Zeus's epithet to be shifted from Karios to Panamaros; the emergent divine identity of Zeus Panamaros was Stratonicea's protector, who appeared on its coinage and had his epiphany recalled in a ten-day festival, the Panamareia. (Note: Rivault, para. 1. On the shift between epithets, see Williamson, p. 397; for the festival's length, see Williamson, p. 371.) The Carian city of Euromus was the site of a temple dedicated to Zeus Lepsinos, which is among the best-preserved from Anatolia.

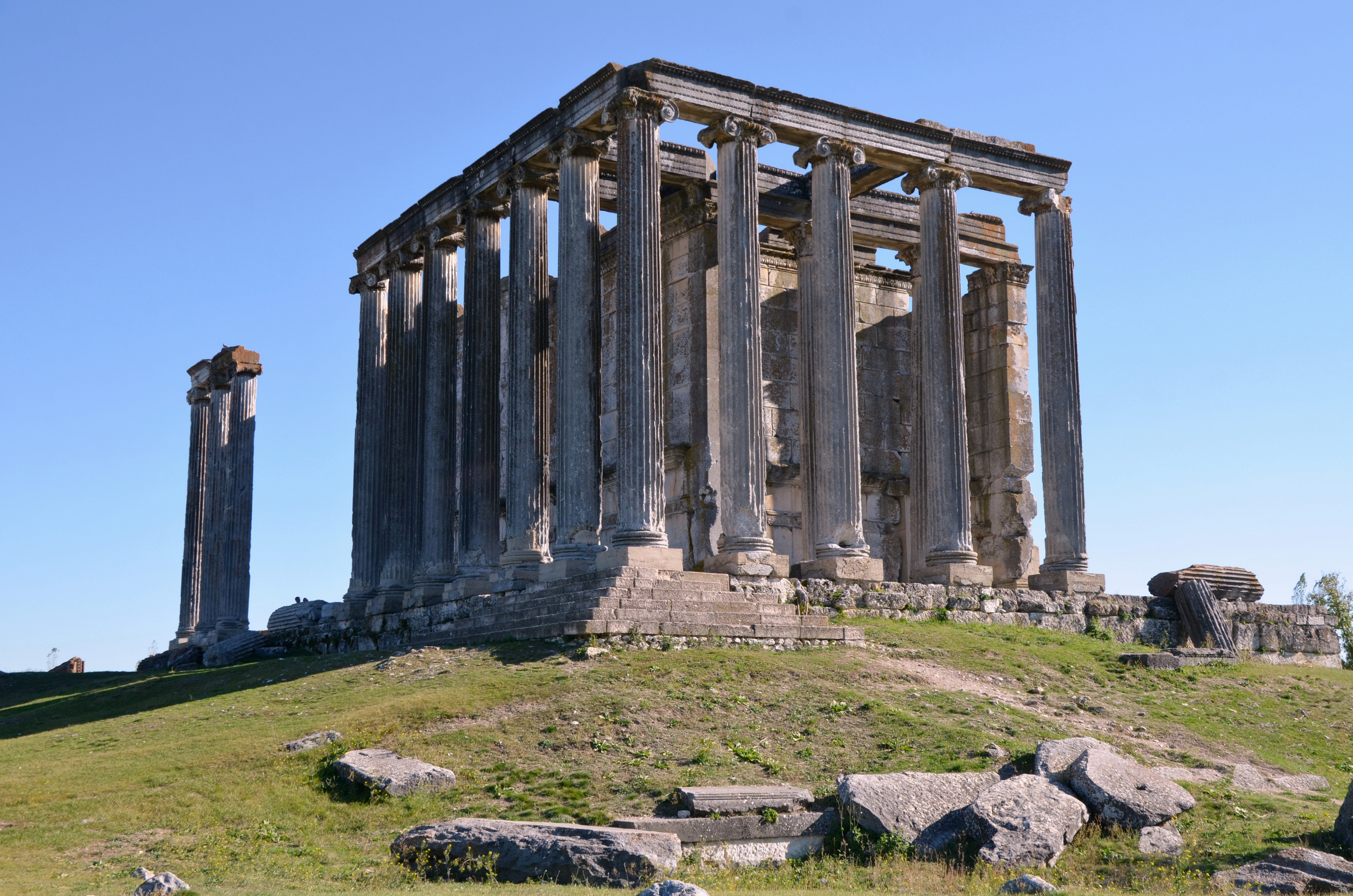
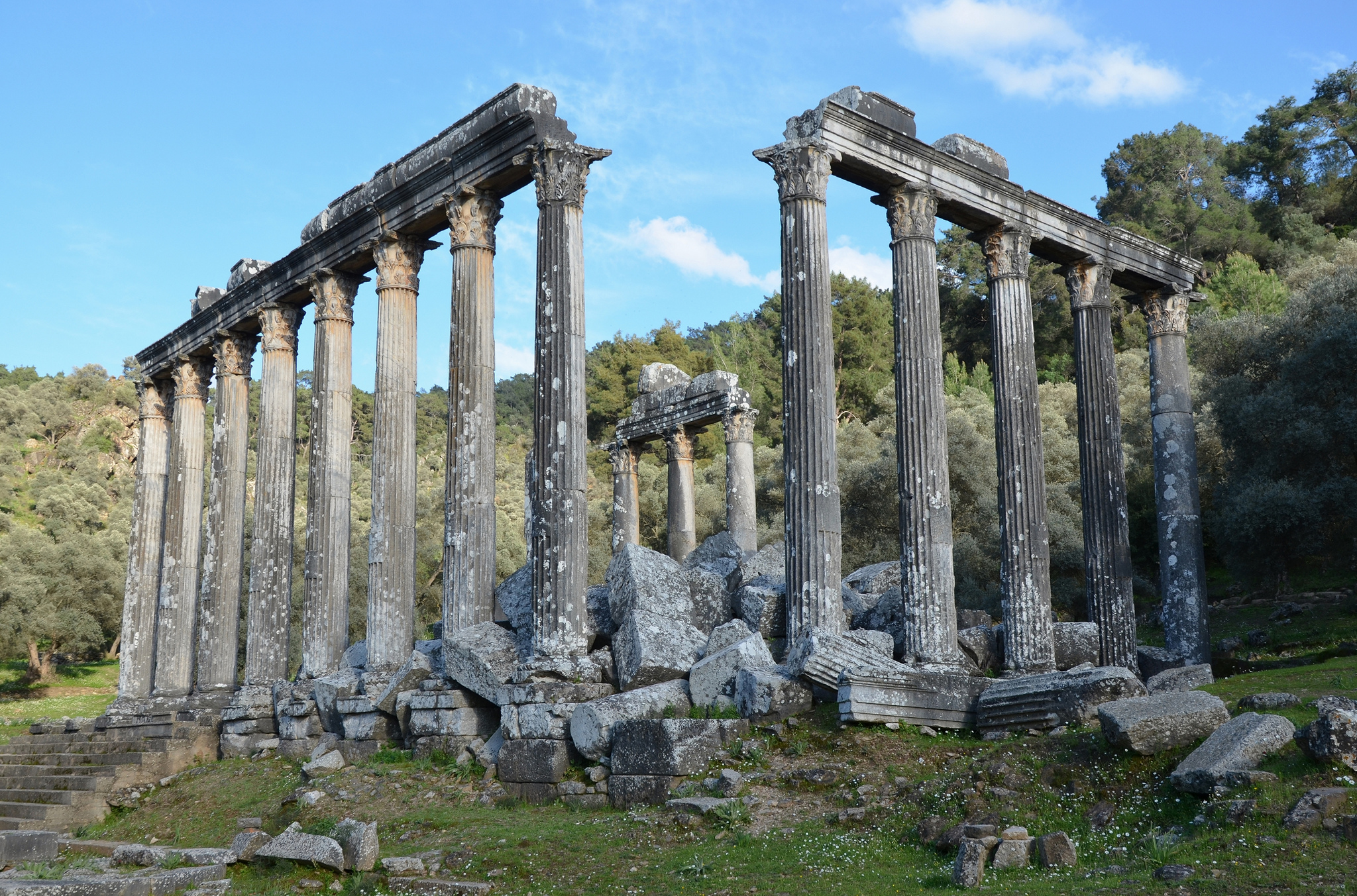
Remains of the temples of Zeus at Aizanoi (left) and Euromus (right)

Most of the few instances of Zeus as a city's protector and chief god, honoured with an acropolitan temple, come from Anatolia. (Note: Kreutz, p. 259. On the rarity of these characteristics in Zeus's cult, see § Distribution and characteristics. According to Kreutz, the sole example outside Anatolia is the city of Messene.) At Selge, in the region of Pisidia, there was an Ionic temple of Zeus on the acropolis, to which a 3rd-century BC date has been assigned. Zeus had replaced a long-established Anatolian weather deity in the city, probably during the Hellenistic period. (Note: Mitchell & Waelkens, p. 63. For this temple's location as the acropolis and on Zeus's replacement of an Anatolian weather god, see Kreutz, p. 259.) Zeus was the chief god of the Phrygian city of Aizanoi, and the recipient of its largest temple, the building of which commenced in the 1st century AD; there was an earlier temple to him in the city, dating to the 2nd century BC at the latest. (Note: Kreutz, pp. 105, 107. This Zeus had similarly replaced an indigenous Anatolian god at Aizanoi (Kreutz, p. 260).)

On Mount Tmolus, in the region of Lydia, the Lydian Zeus was worshipped as a rain deity, a cult referenced by the poet Eumelus of Corinth (who may date to the 8th century BC). The city of Magnesia on the Maeander, in Ionia, celebrated a festival in honour of Zeus Sosipolis ('saviour of the city'), as recorded in a decree from 196 BC. A bull was purchased, dedicated to Zeus Sosipolis at the start of the agricultural year, and several months later sacrificed to the god, alongside a procession honouring a collection of twelve gods; this ritual reflected the growth of crops, spanning their sowing and harvest.

== Other cults ==
=== Macedonia ===
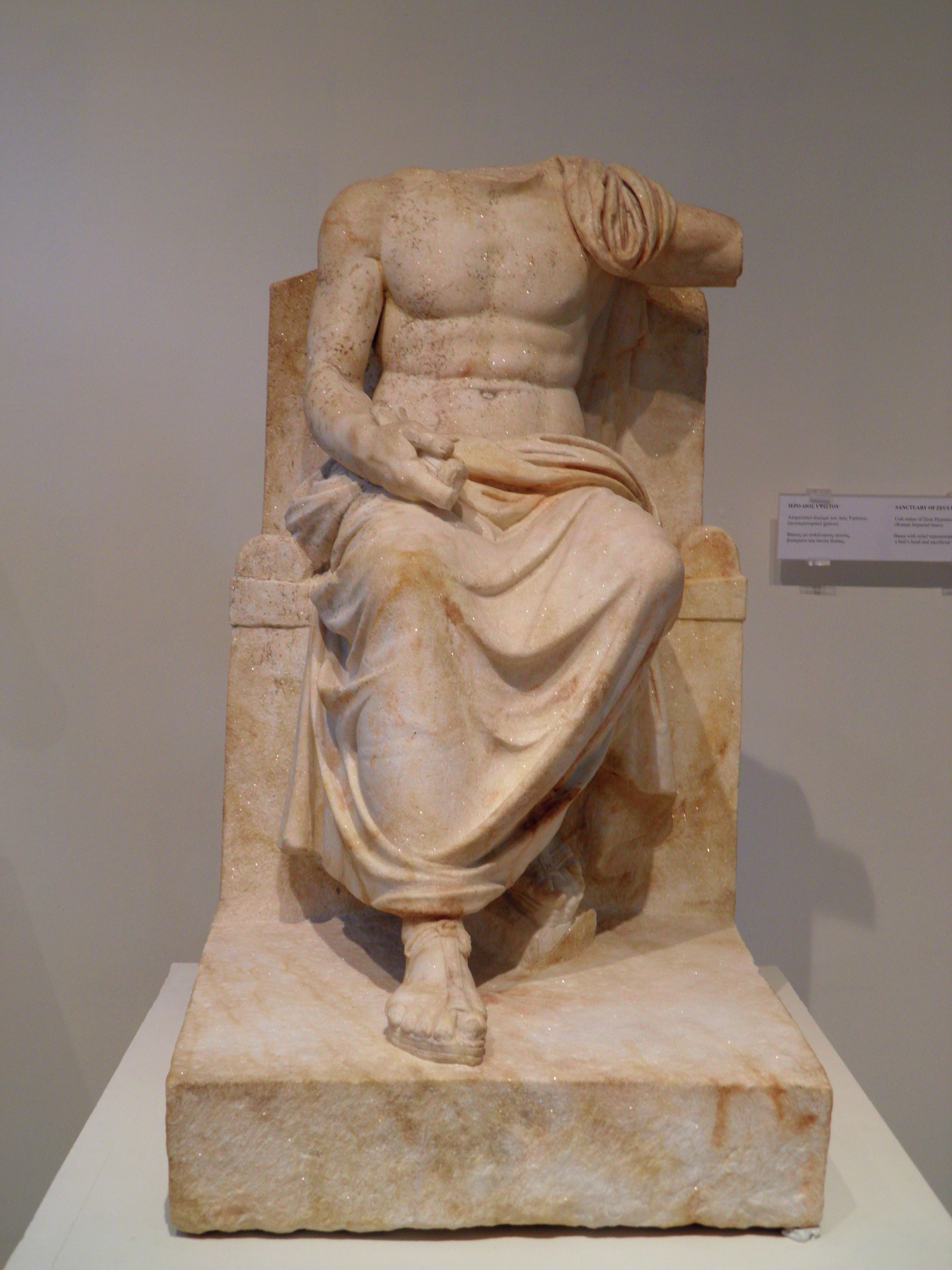
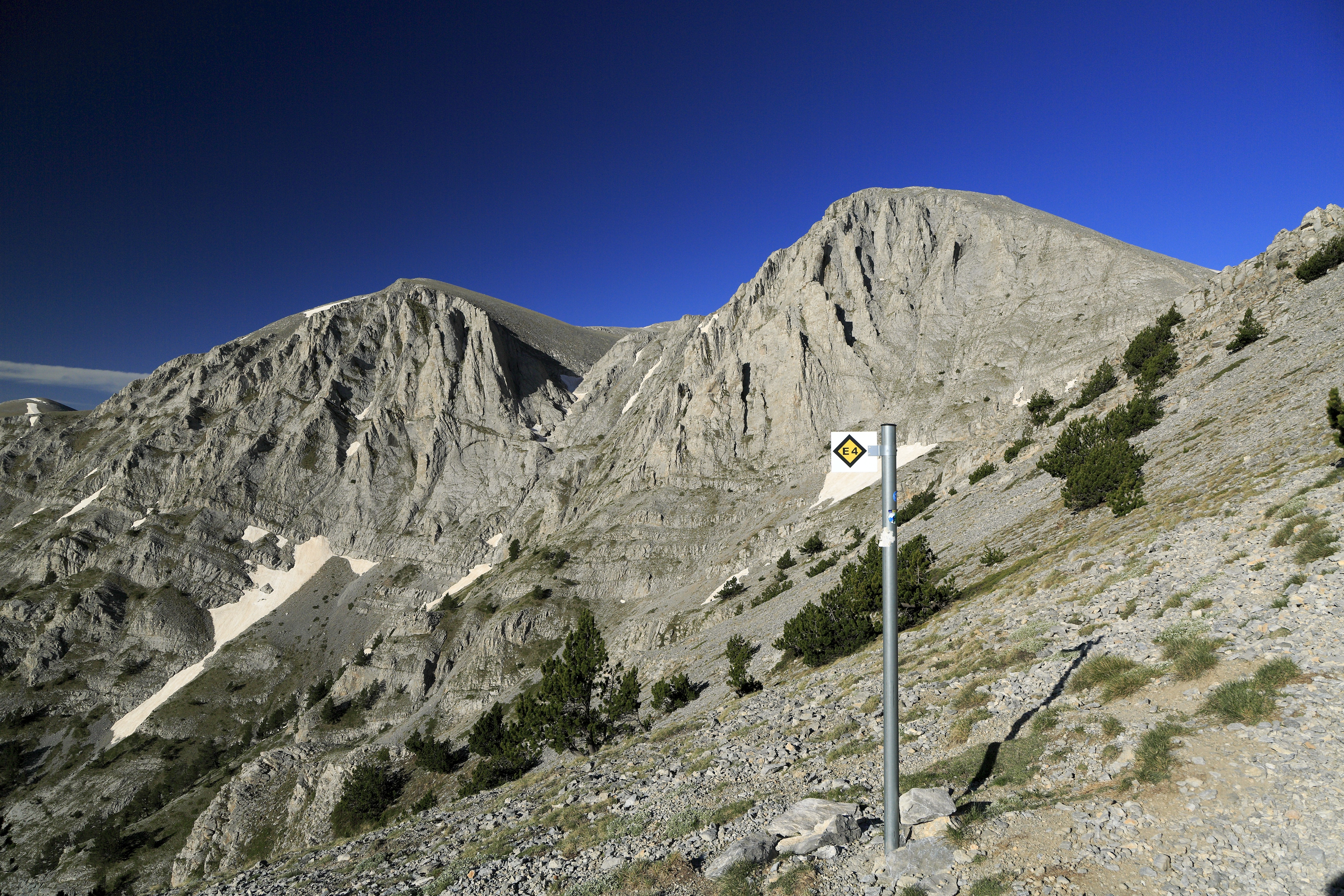
The cult statue of Zeus Hypsistos (top) and the peak of Agios Antonios on Mount Olympus (bottom), where a sanctuary with inscriptions to Zeus Olympios was discovered

Zeus was the foremost god of the kingdom of Macedonia. Straddling its border with Thessaly was Mount Olympus, the tallest mountain on the Greek mainland, and in myth the abode of Zeus and his fellow Olympians. In its foothills sat the town of Dion, the nexus of Macedonian worship and the site of a sanctuary dedicated to Zeus Olympios. This sanctuary included an altar, 22 metres (72 ft) in length, in front of which were numerous bases used for tethering sacrificial animals. (Note: Pandermalis 2002, pp. 99–100. According to Pandermalis, symmetrically reconstructing the rows and spacings of the bases indicates these bases were 36 in number.) The altar was said to have been founded by the mythical hero Deucalion, and to have been the second-oldest dedicated to Zeus (after that on Mount Lykaion). (Note: Voutiras, pp. 335–336. This information is preserved in Papyrus Oxyrhynchus 4443.) Around 400 BC, a nine-day festival to Zeus and the Muses was established at Dion by the Macedonian king Archelaus, including athletic and musical contests. Dion was also the site of a sanctuary of Zeus Hypsistos, including an altar and a temple within which a cult statue of the god was discovered; the evidence from the sanctuary dates to the Hellenistic and Roman eras.

There was a sanctuary on Agios Antonios, one of Mount Olympus's highest summits, where inscriptions dedicated to Zeus Olympios were found. The archaeological material suggests the presence of a Hellenistic cult, which was restarted during late antiquity, with bones and ash pointing to the use of an ash altar. (Note: Lichtenberger, p. 98. There has been disagreement amongst scholars as to how this cult relates to that at Dion (Graf 2016, p. 72).) Near the city of Aphytis in Chalcidice, there was a temple dedicated to Zeus Ammon, constructed in the 4th century BC. Zeus was also the namesake of the first month of the ancient Macedonian calendar, Dios.
