= Hymn to Dictaean Zeus =

Ancient Greek Hymn

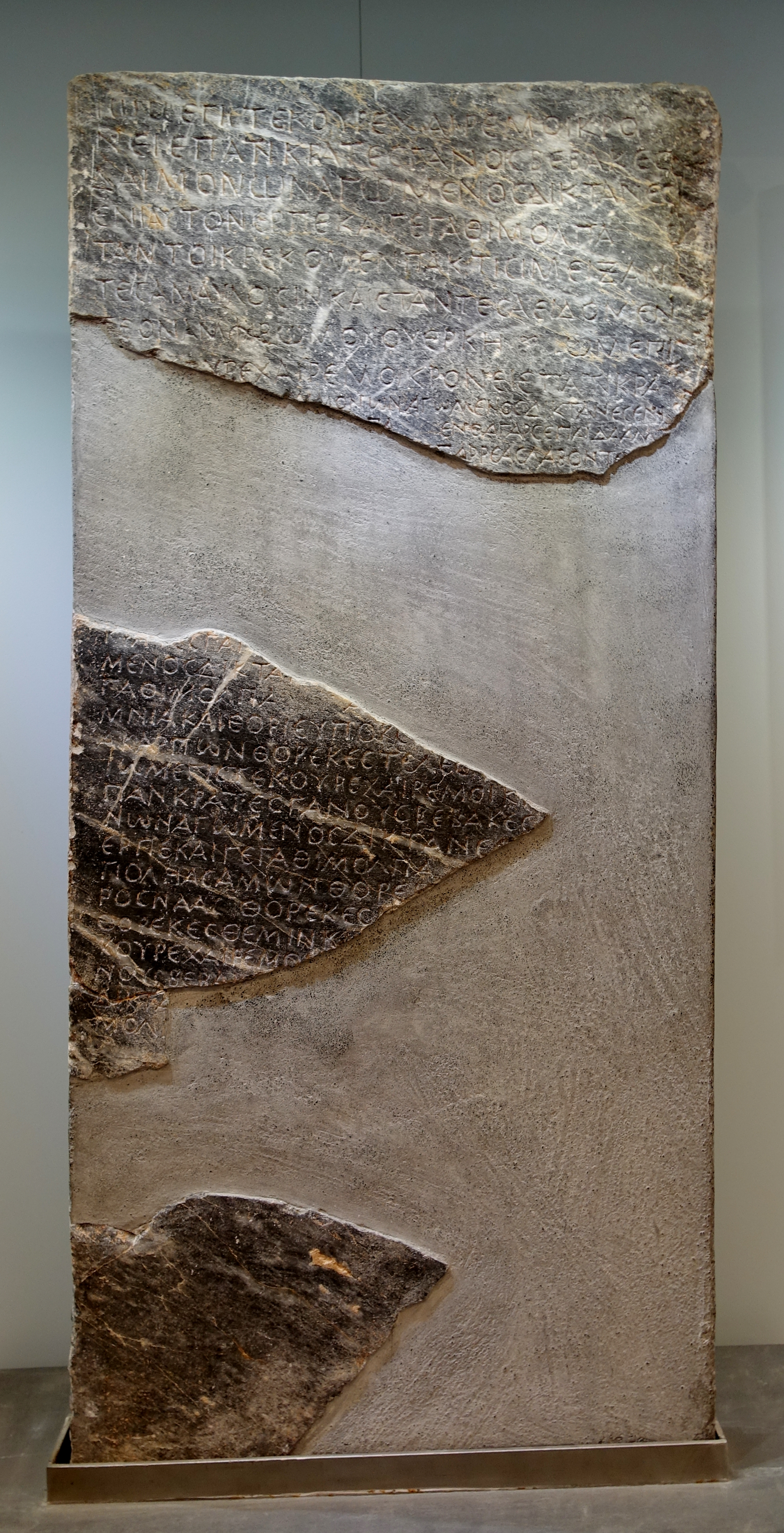
Stele with the Hymn to Dictaean Zeus in the Archaeological Museum of Heraklion, Crete.

The Hymn to Dictaean Zeus, also known as the Hymn of the Couretes, is an Ancient Greek celebratory song in praise of the god Zeus. It is preserved on an ancient limestone stele, four fragments of which were discovered in May 1904 during excavations in Roussolakkos near Palaikastro on the eastern coast of the Greek island of Crete. The hymn invokes Zeus as the "greatest kouros", worshipped as a fertility god who welcomes the young initiates at the annual festival at his birthplace Mount Dicte. The stele, whose discovery made it possible to locate the temple of Dictaean Zeus already known from classical writings, is now on display in the Archaeological Museum of Heraklion.

== Location of discovery ==
The sanctuary of Dictaean Zeus at Roussolakkos existed since the Geometric period (eighth century BC) to the Roman period until the fourth century AD. A temple was built between 550 and 150 BC on the sanctuary, which was on an old Minoan site. Presumably, the sanctuary, which could be attributed to the cult of Dictaean Zeus thanks to the inscription on the stele fragments found in a pit near block Χ at the Roussolakkos archaeological site, was the centre of Heleia (Ἥλεια) or Eleia (Ἑλεία), an Eteocretan city or region which, according to inscriptions and Strabo (10.4.6) had maintained the cult of the sky-god.

The sanctuary, founded around 900 BC, was located about 200 metres from Bondalaki Beach (παραλία Μπονταλάκι) on the east coast of Crete, halfway up a slight hill. Among the findings were bronze relief shields, lebetes, weapons and many vessels testify rich votive offerings. Chalices, lamps and torches that were found prove that wine was consumed in the cult during ceremonies performed at night. The temple developed from a local cult site into a supra-regional religious centre of eastern Crete, whose administration was claimed by the poleis Itanus, Praesus and Hierapytna. Only fragments of the terracotta decoration of the temple building have been preserved, and no remains of walls were found. The corresponding area of block Χ cannot be visited today because it was filled in again after the excavations. To the west of the ancient cult site of Dictaean Zeus, at a distance of 6.5 kilometres, is mountain Modi (Μόδι), which in ancient times was called Dicte according to Strabo (10.4.12) and was considered to be the birthplace of Zeus.

== The hymn ==
=== Text ===
The inscription on the limestone stele, engraved on both sides, dates to the beginning of the third century AD, but the text, judging by its smooth meter, dates from the Hellenistic period of the late fourth or early third century BC, based on older ideas and rites. The text on the stele reads:

ἰὼ μέγιστε κοῦρε, χαῖρέ μοι, Κρόνειε
παγκρατὲς γάνους βέβακες δαιμόνων ἁγώμενος
Δίκταν εἰς ἐνιαυτὸν ἕρπε καὶ γέγαθι μολπᾷ,

τάν τοι κρέκομεν πακτίσι μείξαντες ἅμ’ αὐλοῖσιν,
καὶ στάντες ἀείδομεν τεὸν ἀμφὶ βωμὸν εὐερκῆ.

ἰὼ μέγι[στε] κοῦρε, χαῖρέ μοι, Κρόνειε
παγκρα[τὲς γάνους βέβακες δ]αιμόνων ἁγώμενος
Δίκταν εἰς ἐνι[αυτὸν ἕρπ]ε καὶ γέγαθι μολπᾷ.

ἔνθα γὰρ σέ παῖδ’ ἄμ(β)ρ(ο)τον ἀσπιδ[ηφόροι τροφῆες]
πὰρ Ῥέας λαβόντες πό(δ)α κ[ρούοντες ἀπέκρυψαν]

[ἰὼ μέγιστε κοῦρε, χαῖρέ μοι, Κρόνειε]
[παγκρατὲς γάνους βέβακες δαιμόνων ἁγώμενος]
[Δίκταν εἰς ἐνιαυτὸν ἕρπε καὶ γέγαθι μολπᾷ.]

[— — — —]
[— — – τ]ᾶς καλᾶς ἀο(ῦ)ς.

[ἰὼ μέγιστε κοῦρε, χαῖρέ μοι, Κ]ρόνειε
παγκρατὲς γάν[ους βέβακες δαιμόνω]ν ἁγώμενος
Δίκταν εἰς ἐνι[αυτὸν ἕρπε κα]ὶ γέγαθι μολπᾷ.

[ὧραι δὲ β]ρύον κατῆτος καὶ βροτὸς Δίκα κατῆχε
[καὶ πάντα δι]ῇπε (ζ)ώ(ι)’ ἁ φίλολβος Εἰρή(ν)α.

[ἰὼ μέγιστε κοῦρε, χαῖρέ μοι, Κρόνειε]
παγκρατὲς γάν[ους βέβακες δαιμόνων ἁγώ]μενος
Δίκταν εἰς ἐ[νιαυτὸν ἕρπε καὶ γέ]γαθι μολπᾷ.

ἀ[λλ’ ἄναξ θόρ’ ἐς στα]μνία καὶ θόρ’ εὔποκ’ ἐ[ς πώεα]
[κἐς λάι]α καρπῶν θόρε κἐς τελεσφ[όρος οἴκος]

ἰὼ μέγιστε κοῦρε, χαῖρέ μοι, Κρ[όνειε]
παγκρατὲς γάνους βέβακες [δαιμό]νων ἁγώμενος
Δίκταν εἰς ἐνι[αυτὸν] ἕρπε καὶ γέγαθι μολπᾷ.

[θόρε κἐς] πόληας ἁμῶν θόρε κἐς ποντο(π)όρος νᾶας
θόρε κἐς ν[εὸς πο]λείτ(α)ς θόρε κἐς Θέμιν κα[λάν.]

[ἰὼ μέγιστε] κοῦρε, χαῖρέ μοι, Κρόνειε
παγκρατὲς γάνους βέβακ[ες δαιμόνων ἁγ]ώμενος
Δίκταν εἰς ἐνι[αυτὸν ἕρπε καὶ γέγαθι] μολπᾷ.

=== Interpretation ===
The present text follows the standard pattern of ancient Greek hymns; first the invocation, followed by the main body and ending with a request to the deity. The hymn begins and ends with the refrain, which was also sung between each of the six stanzas. The god invoked is not named, but he is referred to as the greatest Kouros and son of Cronus. The description of Rhea, the wife of Cronus, handing over of the "immortal child" to the Curetes in the second stanza makes it clear that Zeus is the one being referenced.

The Cretan Zeus, also called Velchanos, was a vegetation god who was reborn every year, like the Semitic Adonis and the Egyptian Osiris. In the hymn, Zeus, who "jumps" herds, fields, ships, cities and young citizens, is called upon to return to Dicte and enjoy the singing that is taking place at his altar. The request to the young god to "jump" in the last verses can be understood as Zeus "driving into" the things mentioned in order to fertilize them in a metaphorical sense.

The discovery of the chryselephantine statuette known as the Palaikastro Kouros during the excavations at Roussolakkos between 1987–90, with its connection to Minoan initiation rites, shows that the mythical dance of the Curetes and some of the older ideas expressed in the Hymn to Dictaean Zeus were probably based on performances and rituals that took place in Crete as early as 1500 years before the annual performance of the hymn in Greek times. The rites inherited from Minoan culture seem to have continued in antiquity until the Dictaeum (the temple of Dictaean Zeus at Roussolakkos) was abandoned some time after the third century AD following the Christianization of the island.

== Bibliography ==
- Excavations at Palaikastro IV: The Temple of Dictaean Zeus. Macmillan. 1905. pp. 298–308.
- The Palaikastro Hymn of the Kouretes (PDF). Macmillan. 1909. pp. 339–356.
- The Hymn of the Kouretes (PDF). Macmillan. 1909. pp. 357–365.
- Themis: A Study of the Social Origins of Greek Religion. Cambridge University Press. 1912. pp. 1–29.
- The Ritual Theory of Myth. University of California Press. 1971. pp. 29–34. ISBN 978-0-520-01924-9.
- Der Hymnus aus Palaikastro. Eine Spurensuche nach Überresten der minoischen Religion. Biering & Brinkmann. 2000. pp. 219–226. ISBN 978-3-930609-26-0.
- Mark Alonge (December 2005). "The Palaikastro Hymn and the modern myth of the Cretan Zeus" (PDF, 167 KB). Stanford University. p. 2.
