= Thenae (Crete) =

Thenae or Thenai (Greek: Θεναί) was an ancient city in Crete. Its exact location is unknown, but ancient writers suggest that it was near Knossos. The 19th century lexicographer William Smith, suggested that it was close to the Byzantine-era Temenos Fortress.
