= Buphonia =

Religious rite

In ancient Greece, the Buphonia (Ancient Greek: Βουφόνια "ox-slayings") denoted a sacrificial ceremony performed at Athens as part of the Dipolieia, a religious festival held on the 14th of the midsummer month Skirophorion—in June or July—at the Acropolis. In the Buphonia a working ox was sacrificed to Zeus Polieus (Zeus protector of the city), which shows parallels to traditional rituals customs from early antiquity. A group of oxen was driven forward to the altar at the highest point of the Acropolis. On the altar a sacrifice of grain had been spread by members of the family of the Kentriadae, on whom this duty devolved hereditarily. When one of the oxen began to eat, thus selecting itself for sacrifice, one of the family of the Thaulonidae advanced with an axe, slew the ox, then immediately threw aside the axe and fled the scene of his guilt-laden crime.

== Origins and duration ==
The Athenians of the age of Aristophanes regarded the sombre ritual as archaic; its founding myth attributed its inception to Cecrops, the chthonic king of remotest legend (Aristophanes), to Diomus (Theophrastus, cited by Porphyry in De abstinentia 2.10.2) or to archaic Erechtheus (Pausanias 1.28.10). The Dipolieia survived at least to the time of the Roman Empire.

The offering of grain was a reminder of the time "when people shrank from eating oxen," as Plato related in The Laws (782c), "and offered no animals in sacrifice, but rather, cakes and the fruits of the earth soaked in honey, and other such pure sacrifices."

== Details and explanation ==
Details of the rite can be reconstructed in detail, thanks to a passage in Porphyry that has been traced to a source in Theophrastus. Although the slaughter of a laboring ox was forbidden, it was excused in these exceptional circumstances; nonetheless it was regarded as a murder. The axe, therefore, as being polluted by murder, was immediately afterward carried before the court of the Prytaneum, which tried the inanimate object for murder, and, after the water-bearers who lustrated the axe, the sharpeners who sharpened it, the axe-bearer who carried it, each denied in turn responsibility for the deed, the guilty axe or knife was there charged with having caused the death of the ox, for which the axe was acquitted (Pausanias) or the sacrificial knife was thrown into the sea (Porphyry).

In the enactment of this comedy of innocence, and the joint feasting of all who participated save the slayer himself, individual consciences were assuaged and the polis was reaffirmed. The burden of guilt was doubly displaced, not only through the buck-passing of the trial, but also through the apparently "guilty" act of the oxen in selecting itself through the initial eating.

== Account by Pausanias ==
In Pausanias’s description of the ritual, barley and wheat are mixed and left upon the altar. The ox that has been prepared for sacrifice is brought to the altar where it begins to eat the grain. A priest, referred to as the ox-slayer, kills the ox and runs away as he tosses away the murder weapon. The axe is then brought to trial.

== Account by Porphyry ==
The description by Porphyry describes the founding of the ritual killing. A farmer from Attica by the name of Diomus was in Athens celebrating a common sacrifice. A working ox approached the table where the cakes and offerings had been laid out. When the ox had ate some and trampled upon the rest, Diomus killed the ox with an axe and proceeded to bury it.

Perceiving the act to be an impious one, Diomus is said to have fled to Crete. Meanwhile the Attic land was struck by drought and sterility of fruit. When the people consulted the Pythian deity, the God said the murderer must be punished and a statue of the ox erected in the place. Diomus, seeking to be freed from the crime, determined that an ox should be slain by the city so that all the men would have the act in common. The people therefore take part in the slaughter with Diomus being the one to strike the ox.

Porphyry describes the deed as follows. Virgins are to act as drawers of water. Three separate persons are respectively responsible for giving the axe, striking the ox, and cutting the throat of the ox. All who are present then eat of the ox. The ox hide is then stuffed with straw and yoked to a plow.

The judicial process then proceeds in a ritual manner. The drawers of water accuse the knife sharpeners who then accuse the one who handed over the ax. That person then accuses the one who cut the throat, who in turn accuses the knife. In such a way the knife is found to be guilty and is cast into the sea.

These events are repeated each year on the Acropolis at Athens. Cakes are placed on a brazen table and oxen are driven to the area. The one that eats of the cakes is chosen for the ritual killing. Various names are designated based on the roles played. Those whose origins come from Diomus are designated as boutupoi (slayers of oxen). Those who are responsible for the driving of the oxen are designated kentriadai (stimulators). Finally those who cut the ox’s throat are designated daitroi (dividers) following the distribution of the resulting meat.

== Location on the Acropolis ==
The Bouphonia festival took place on the eastern side of the Acropolis. In contrast with the rest of the structures on the Acropolis, there are two areas here which were largely open. The area on the west functioned as an enclosure to corral oxen. This would have sufficed to hold the singular oxen for the Bouphonia, as well as having the capacity to host larger numbers of sacrifices during the Panathenaia.

To the east of this area is found a series of cuttings. Previous scholarship has identified these as belonging to the foundations of a barn (Gorham Stevens). More recently it has been proposed that, in combination with the post holes in the area, these cuttings served in the function of a cattle chute. Cattle would be kept in the open area to the west and then led to the eastern area for the ritual slaughter. The chutes would help in management of large numbers of cattle. The dressed bedrock in the area represents channels used to rinse down the blood and discarded animal parts generated during the slaughter.

== See also ==
- Athenian festivals
