= Diisoteria =

Ancient Greek festival

The Diisoteria was an ancient Greek festival celebrated in the city of Piraeus, in the region of Attica. It was dedicated to the deities Zeus Soter and Athena Soteira (where "Soter" and "Soteira" are epithets, each meaning 'Saviour'). The central element of the festival was a procession that ended at the temple dedicated to the two gods in Piraeus. As early as the 4th century BC, there was a procession to a shrine of Zeus Soter in the city, and an inscription from the same century mentions the sale of a large number of skins of animals sacrificed as part of the festival. Two inscriptions from the Athenian agora, where there was another cult to a Zeus Soter, refer to a procession in honour of Zeus Soter and Athena Soteira; this has elicited scholarly suggestions about the possible relationship of the procession in Piraeus to the god's cult in the agora. The name "Diisoteria" is first attested in 140 or 139 BC, and in its later history the festival may have included boat racing. It was celebrated during Skirophorion, the Attic calendar's final month, though the exact days on which it was held are unclear.

== Cult ==
Piraeus was a deme (or district) of the region of Attica, situated along its western coast. It was around 7 kilometres (4.3 mi) from Athens, and included that city's main harbour. In the harbour city of Piraeus, Zeus Soter – that is, Zeus under the epithet "Soter", meaning 'Saviour' (Note: On Soter, and for this translation, see Zimmermann, para. 1.) – was honoured with a cult, which was among Attica's most popular during the classical period (c. 5th–4th centuries). There was also a cult of Zeus Soter in the Athenian agora (a public assembly space within the city), where he was identified with Zeus Eleutherios ('of freedom'). (Note: Rosivach, pp. 262–263. For this translation, see Larson, p. 20.) The cult of Zeus Soter in Piraeus is attested by the early 4th century BC, and mostly serviced individual worshippers hoping to be "saved" from personal problems, attracting visitors from Attica and abroad. He was the recipient of a temple in the city, where he was honoured alongside Athena Soteira ("Soteira" being the feminine form of "Soter", and thus also meaning 'Saviour'). (Note: Larson, p. 20. For "Soteira" as the feminine form of "Soter", see Zimmermann, para. 1.)

== Procession and sacrifice ==
The Diisoteria festival jointly celebrated Zeus Soter and Athena Soteira, and its central element was a procession which ended at the temple dedicated to the two gods in Piraeus. As early as the 4th century BC, Piraeus hosted a procession that led to Zeus Soter's shrine and was followed by sacrifices. (Note: Parker 2005, p. 466, citing Aristotle, Constitution of the Athenians 56.5; IG II^{2} 380.20–21, 30–31; IG II^{2} 1496.88–89, 118–119.) In an inscription recording the sale of animal skins in the years 334 to 333 and 333 to 332 BC, the Diisoteria is the festival which yields the greatest monetary return; (Note: Parker 1996, pp. 239–240 n. 78. In these years, it returned 1050 and 2610 and a half drachmas, respectively.) A decree dating to the 270s celebrates the epimeletai (or functionaries) of the festival for their role in facilitating the sacrifice; another decree from the same decade honours them for the same reason, for their role in the procession to the two gods, and for setting up a couch and table, all of these seemingly being part of the one festival. (Note: Parker 2005, pp. 466–467, citing Agora XVI 186; IG II^{2} 676. For the epimeletai as functonaries, see Rhodes, para. 1.) These two inscriptions are from the Athenian agora; Robert Parker considers it possible that the cult of Zeus Soter in the agora had its own procession, developed during the 270s at the same time as Piraeus's separation from Athens. (Note: Parker 2005, p. 467 (from Athenian agora); Parker 1996, p. 240 n. 79 (agora had its own procession).) On the basis of the latter of these decrees, Angelos Matthaiou has propounded that this procession began in Athens and ended in Piraeus. (Note: Matthaiou, p. 43–44, as cited by Oliver, p. 108. This idea had previously been put forward in 1898 by Mommsen, p. 526.) Another decree, similar to these two, mentions sacrifices to Zeus Soter and Athena Soteira, as well as to Asclepius and Hygieia. (Note: Parker 2005, p. 467, citing IG II^{2} 783.)

The earliest attestation of the name "Diisoteria" is in an inscription dating to the year 140 to 139 BC. (Note: Mikalson 1998, p. 39 n. 83 (140 or 139 BC); Parker 2005, p. 466 (139 BC); IG II^{2} 971.42–45.) According to Robert Garland, the Diisoteria continued to be held until 86 BC. He also believes that the festival incorporated a boat race in its later years, starting at the "Grand Harbour" in Piraeus and ending at the port of Munichia, an activity mentioned by an inscription in relation to the Athenian Munichia festival to Artemis; (Note: Garland, p. 138. On this inscription, IG II^{2} 1006, see Parker 2005, p. 466.) according to Donald G. Kyle, it cannot be demonstrated that the Diisoteria involved boating competitions during the classical period. In 1977, Herbert William Parke synthesised the ancient sources to attempt to provide a reconstruction of the festival's procession, which in his view included a maiden with a basket, young men who were undergoing military training, and the sacrifice of bulls.

== Date ==
The Diisoteria was celebrated in Skirophorion, the last month in the Attic calendar. An inscription dating to the Lycurgan period (c. 336–324 BC) appears to place the Diisoteria after the Bendidia, an Attic festival honouring the Thracian goddess Bendis, held on the 19th or 20th of Thargelion (the month before Skirophorion). (Note: Parker 2005, p. 467, citing IG II^{2} 1496.88–89, 118–119. For these dates for the Lycurgan period, see Papastamati-von Moock, p. 18. This is the same inscription as that which recorded skin sales, referenced above.) The same inscription points to two festivals taking place following the Diisoteria and before the year's end. A speech dating to 383 or 382 BC by orator Lysias mentions that on the 30th of Skirophorion there was a sacrifice in honour of Zeus Soter. (Note: Mikalson 2015, p. 180; Parker 2005, p. 467; Lysias, 26.6.) Jon D. Mikalson believes that this sacrifice was not part of the Diisoteria, pointing to the inscription which records the celebration of two festivals later in the year than the Diisoteria. (Note: Mikalson 2015, p. 180. Parker 1996, p. 240 n. 78 considers it possible that this reference pertains to the cult of Zeus Soter in the agora.) The two decrees celebrating the festival's epimeletai were passed on the 11th and 20th of Skirophorion, implying that it was held prior to the 11th of the month. (Note: Parker 2005, p. 467, citing IG II^{2} 676; Agora XVI 186.) Parker is of the view that Zeus Soter's sacrifice was moved from the final day of the year to earlier in Skirophorion during the period from 383 or 382 to around 350.
