= Manousakis =

Manousakis (Greek: Μανουσάκης) is a Greek surname deriving from the name Manousos. Notable people with the surname include:

- Dimosthenis Manousakis (born 1981), Greek footballer
- Efstratios Manousakis (born 1957), Greek physicist
- Georgios Manousakis (born 1998), Greek footballer
- Manousos Manousakis (1950–2024), Greek film director, producer, writer and actor
- Spyridon Manousakis (born 1984), Egyptian-born Greek wrestler
