= Sfaka =

Sfaka Σφάκα
- Community
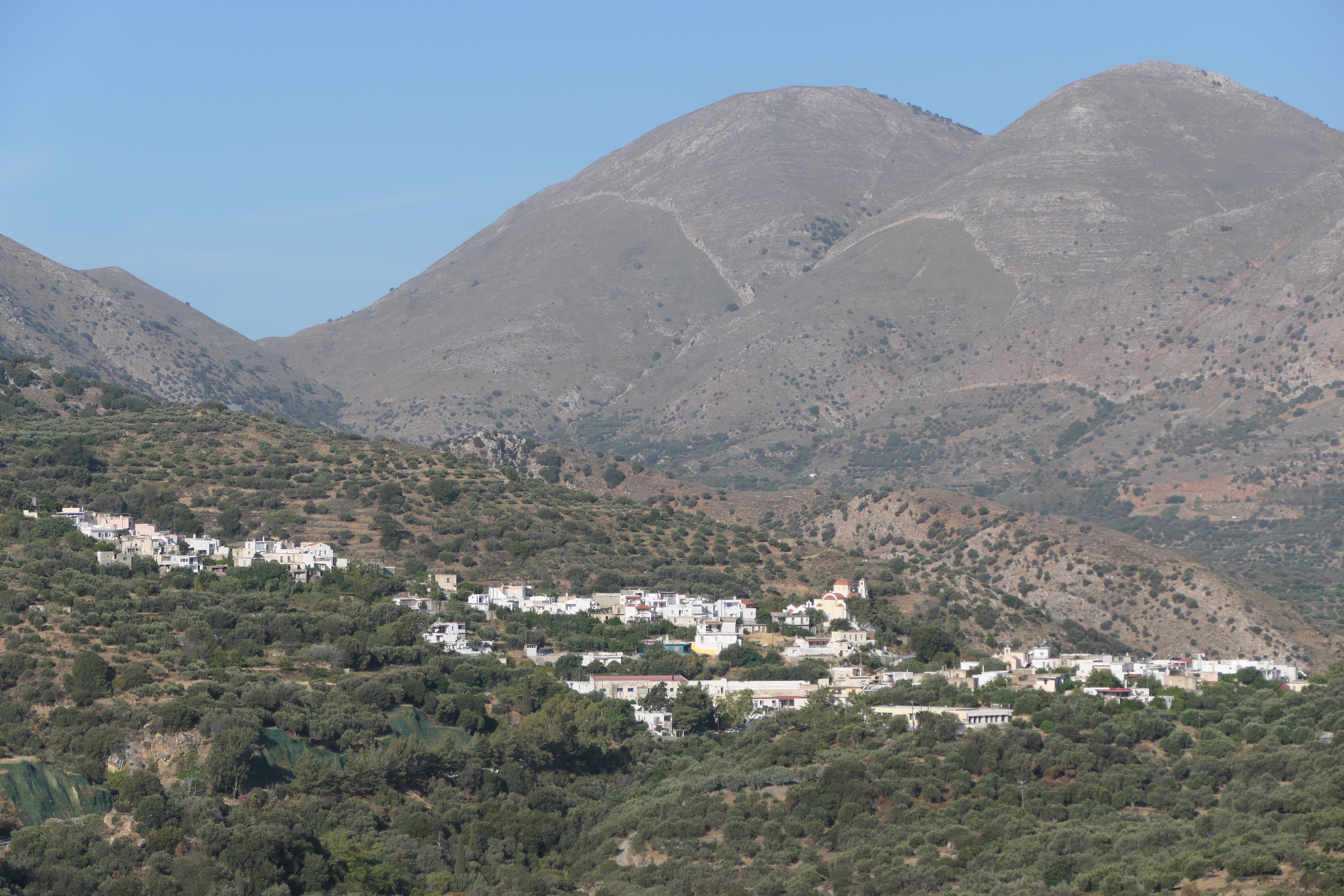

- Location within Greece
- Coordinates: 35°09′18″N 25°55′25″E
- Country: Greece
- Administrative region: Crete
- Regional unit: Lasithi
- Municipality: Siteia
- Municipal unit: Siteia

Population (2021)
  - Community: 323
- Time zone: UTC+2 (EET)
  - Summer (DST): UTC+3 (EEST)

Sfaka is a mountain village in Crete, situated between Agios Nikolaos and Sitia. Sfaka belongs to the Municipality of Sitia.

It has a long history, and archaeological monuments including the meta-Byzantine icons of "Stavrosis" and the Church "Panagia" in the "Kato Chorio". Sfaka now has 200 - 250 inhabitants, but in the past its population was greater than 2000. Recently, Sfaka has been considered a tourist destination for its port, Mochlos.
