= Palaikastro Kouros =

Bronze-age statue of a male found at Roussolakkos in east Crete

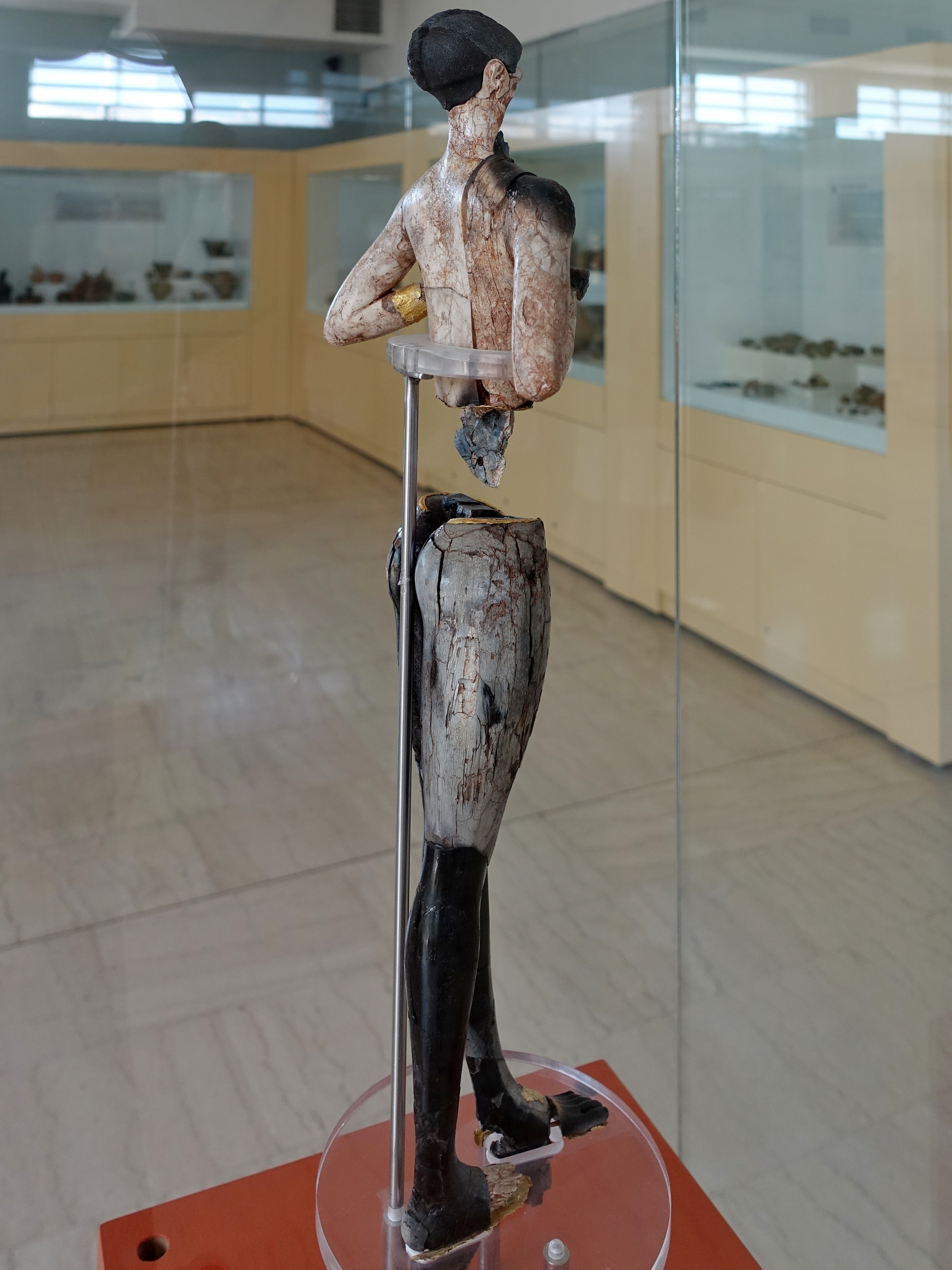
- Palaikastro Kouros from behind
- Height: 50 cm
- Created: c. 1450 BC
- Discovered: 1987; Palaikastro, Crete, Greece
- Present location: Sitia, Crete, Greece

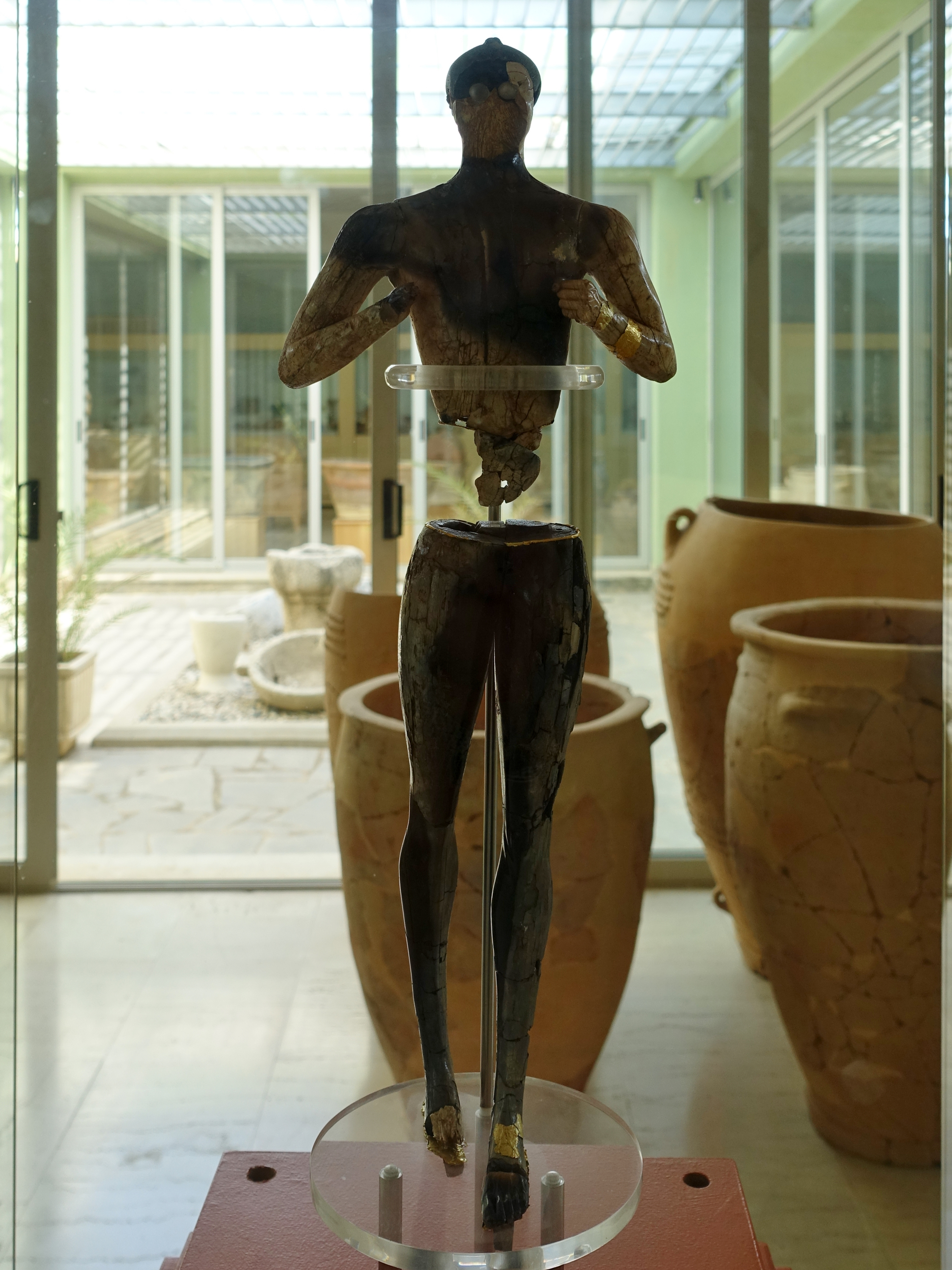
Palaikastro Kouros

The Palaikastro Kouros (Greek: Κούρος του Παλαίκαστρου) is a chryselephantine statuette of a male youth (kouros) excavated in stages in the modern-day town of Palaikastro on the Greek island of Crete. It has been dated to the Late Minoan 1B period in the mid-15th century BC, during the Bronze Age. It is now on display in the Archaeological Museum of Siteia. Standing roughly 50 cm (19.5 in) tall, its large size by the standards of other figurines in Minoan art, and the value of its materials may indicate that it was a cult image for worship, the only one known from the Minoan civilization.

== Description ==
The majority of its body (torso, legs, arms, and feet) is made of hippopotamus tooth covered with gold foil, but the hair part of the head is carved from gray-green serpentinite with rock-crystal eyes and ivory details. Where the carved surface survives relatively well, the carving is extremely detailed, showing the veins and tendons of the hands and feet. The face is completely missing, but the elaborate stone hairstyle, with "a shaved scalp and Mohawk-like crest", survives. The position of the arms can be parallelled in some terracotta figurines from Petsofas, a peak sanctuary overlooking the town. The ivory pieces were held together with olivewood dowels.

The figure presumably represents the "young god" who had appeared relatively recently in Minoan religion, as a consort or son (or both?) of the main mother goddess. He has been regarded by some as a very early form of Zeus, the main god in much later Ancient Greek religion. Palaikastro is very close to one of the main traditional sites of the Dictaean Cave where Zeus grew up. The "young god" may have been a "vegetable god" who died in the winter and was reborn in the spring each year, perhaps associated with the constellation of Orion. The figure has been burnt and apparently also deliberately smashed up, probably in the invasion of Crete by Mycenean Greece that is thought to have taken place around 1450 BC, when the city of Palaikastro was badly burned. Alternatively, it may have been destroyed by Minoan traditionalists, in a reaction to new Egyptian-influenced religious forms.

== Excavation ==
The statue was found in several stages over a number of years: most of the torso in 1987, and the head in 1988. Unexpectedly, parts of the legs were then found in 1990, some thirty feet away from where the upper body parts had been. A thorough and careful water-sieving of six tons of soil from the site then produced hundreds of further fragments, including most of the feet, the eyes, and part of an ear. Piecing all these together took a further four years. Parts of a gold kilt and an ivory dagger pommel were also found, but are not included in the reconstructed figure. Fragments of what is thought to have been a wooden base, painted with Egyptian blue and decorated with gold leaf were also found. Possibly a "star-spangled" base represented the starry sky the god walked on.

A small serpentinite boulder was excavated very close to the kouros; perhaps it was its baetyl or sacred stone. In Minoan religion, it has been suggested that rubbing, lying, or sleeping on a baetyl could summon a vision of the god, an event which appears to be depicted on some gold Minoan seal rings, where the stones are large oval boulders.

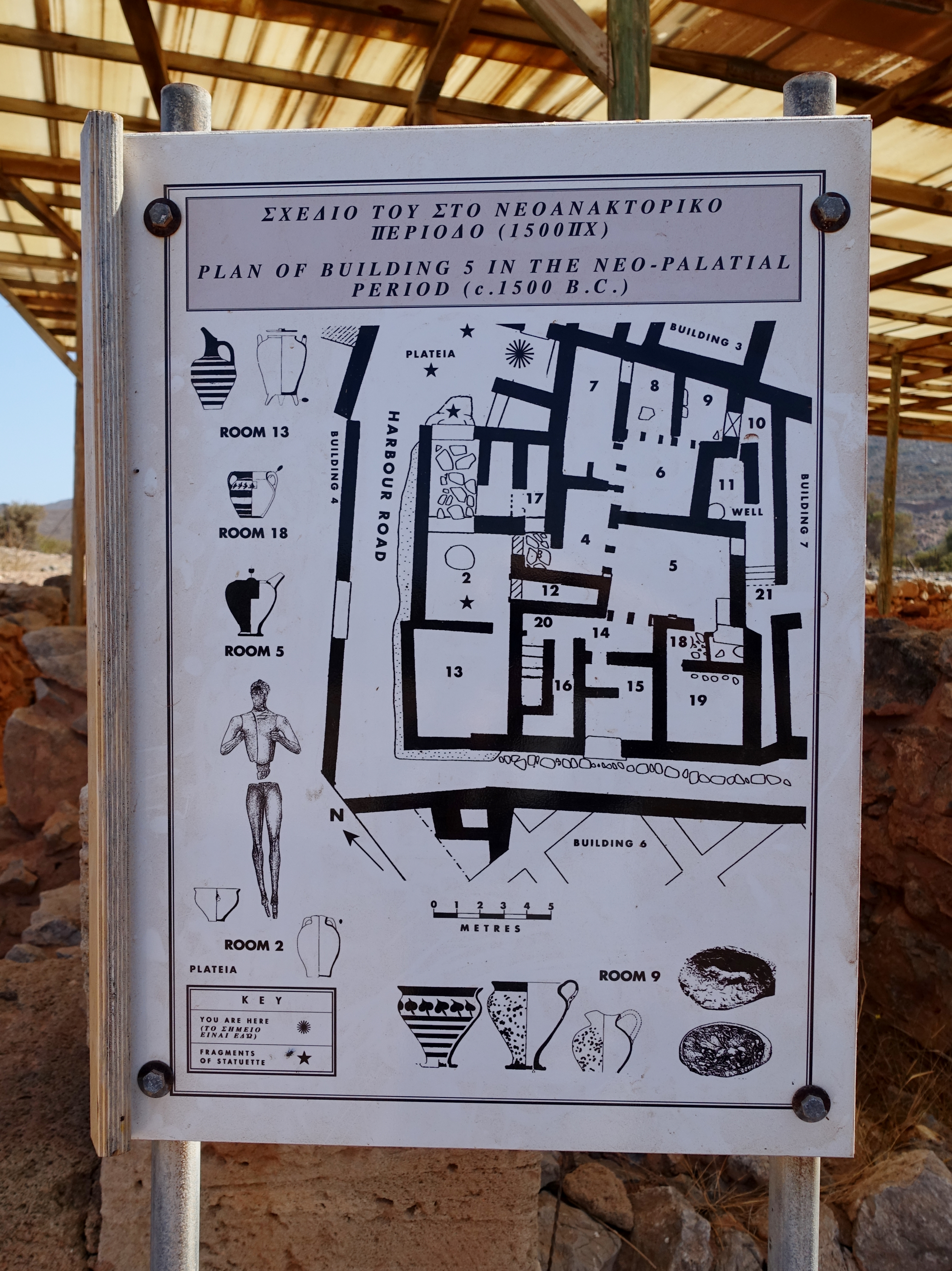
Map of "building 5" where parts of the statue were found at 4 locations, marked with *

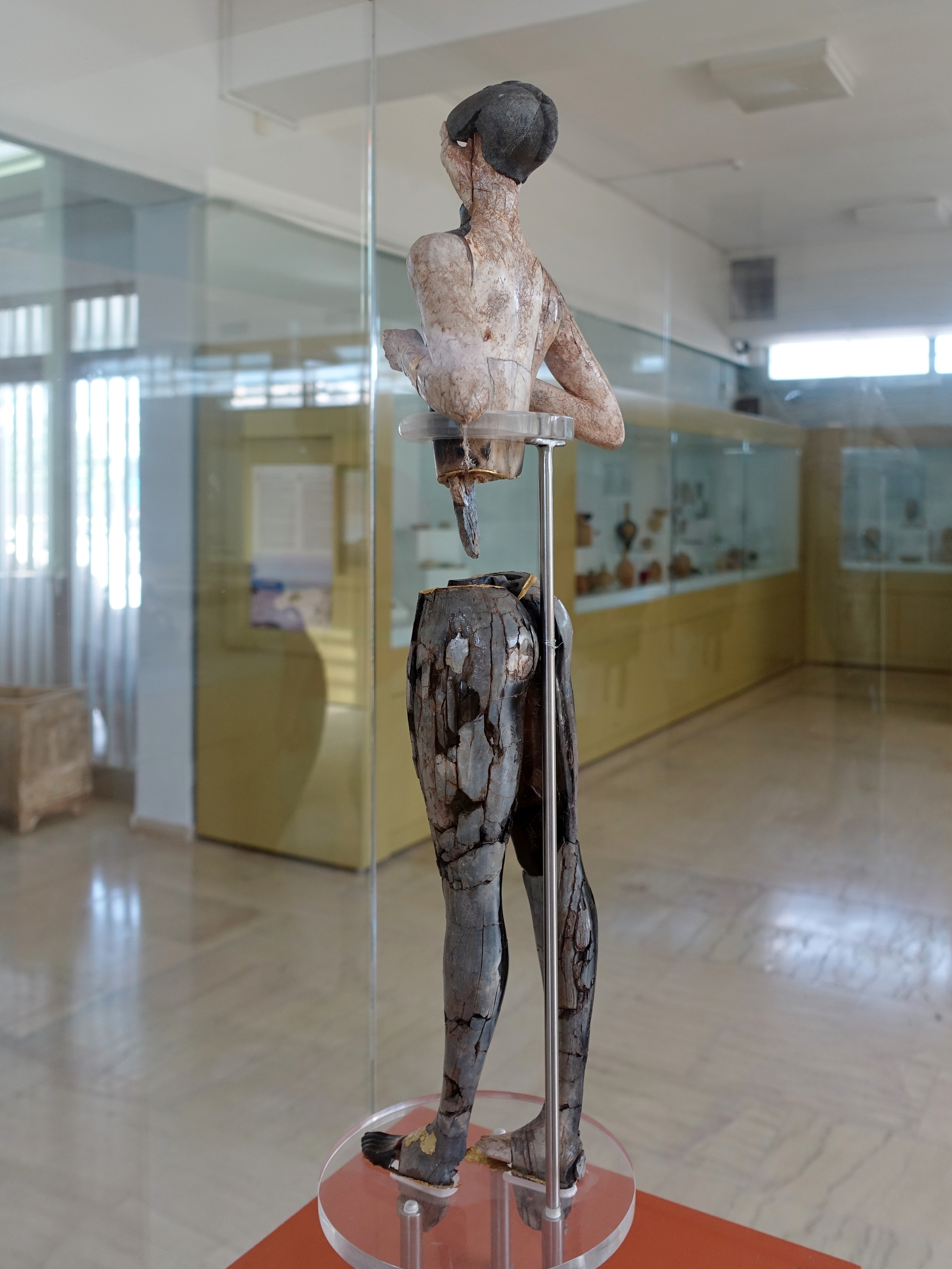
Another angle

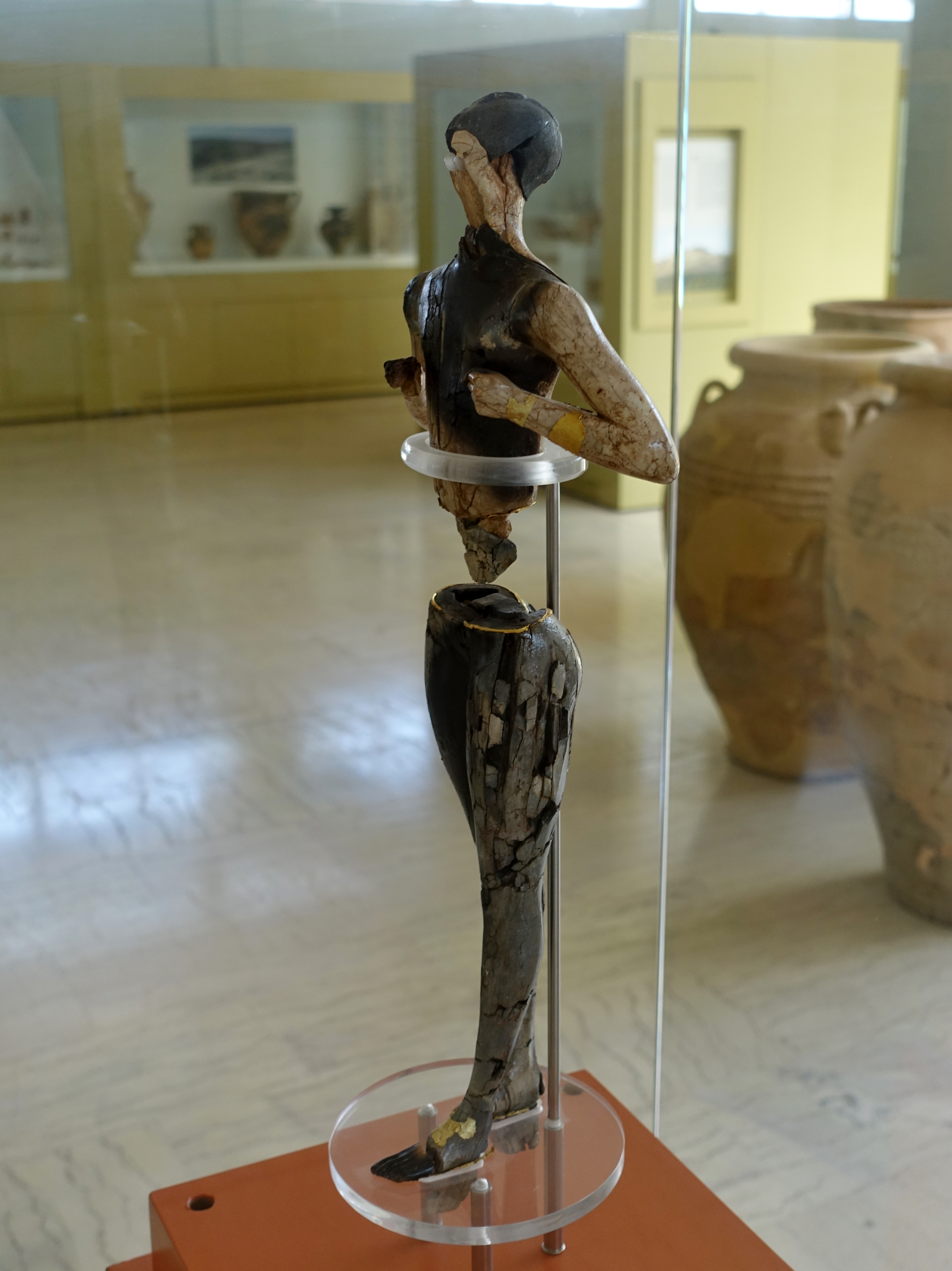
Another angle

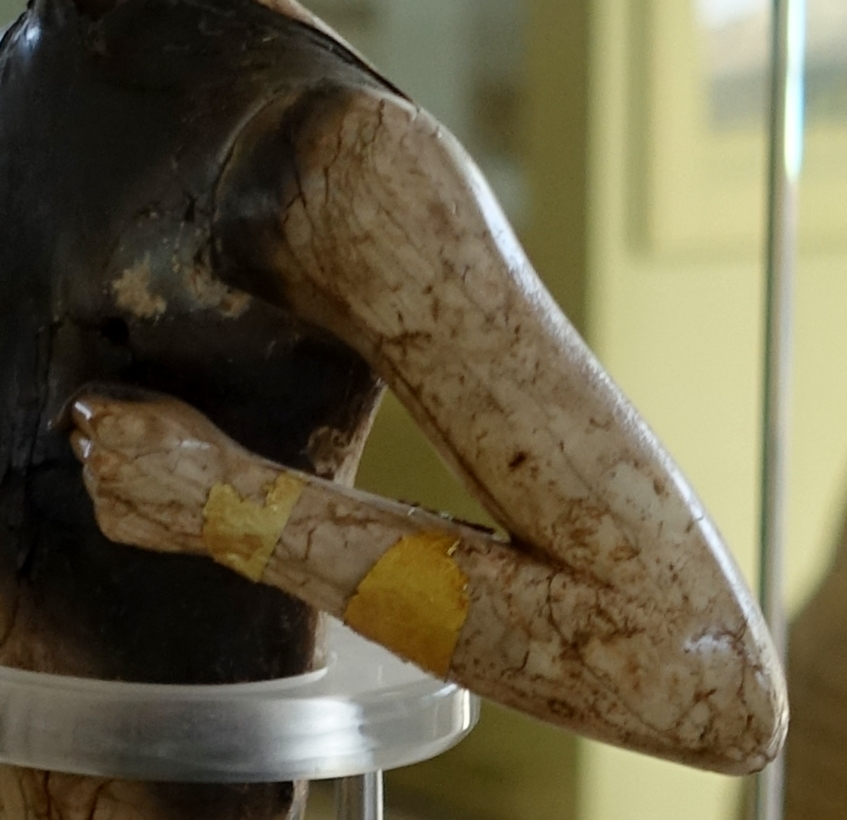
Detail
