= Achladia (disambiguation) =

Achladia is an archaeological site and a village in Lasithi, Crete.

Achladia may also refer to:

- Achladia, Attica, a subdivision of Porto Rafti ESE of Athens in the Attica prefecture and region
- Achladia, Drama, a village in the Drama Prefecture, part of the municipality of Kato Nevrokopi
- Achladia, Karditsa, a village in the Karditsa Prefecture, part of the municipality of Tamasio
- Achladia, Phthiotis, a village in Phthiotis, part of the municipality of Domokos
- Achladia, Thesprotia, a village in Thesprotia, part of the municipality of Filiates
- Achladia, Trikala, a village in the Trikala Prefecture, part of the municipality of Chasia
