= Ziros =

Ziros may refer to:

- Ziros, Lasithi, a village on the island Crete, Greece
- Ziros, Preveza, a municipality in the Preveza regional unit, Greece
- Lake Ziros, a lake in the Preveza regional unit, Greece
