= Analipsi =

Analipsi (Greek: Ανάληψη) may refer to the following places in Greece:

- Analipsi, Thessaloniki, a village in Langadas municipality
- Analipsi, a village on the island of Astypalaia, Dodecanese
- Analipsi, a village in Kastro-Kyllini, western Peloponnese
- Analipsi, a village in Messenia, southwest Peloponnese
- Analipsi, Lasithi, a village and municipal unit in Lasithi, Crete
- Analipsi, a village near Hersonissos, Crete
- Analipsi, a community in Thermo, Aetolia-Acarnania
- Analipsi Chryssovitsas, a village near Metsovo, Epirus
