= Minoan palace of Petras =

Palace built by the Minoans

The Minoan palace of Petras is a palace built by the Minoans, in the Bronze Age settlement of Patras on the Greek island of Crete. It is located just a few kilometers from the town of Sitia. The site was first excavated in 1985 by Dr. Metexia Tsipopoulou.
