= Achladia =

Archaeological site in Lasithi, Greece

Coordinates: 35°10′N 26°03′E

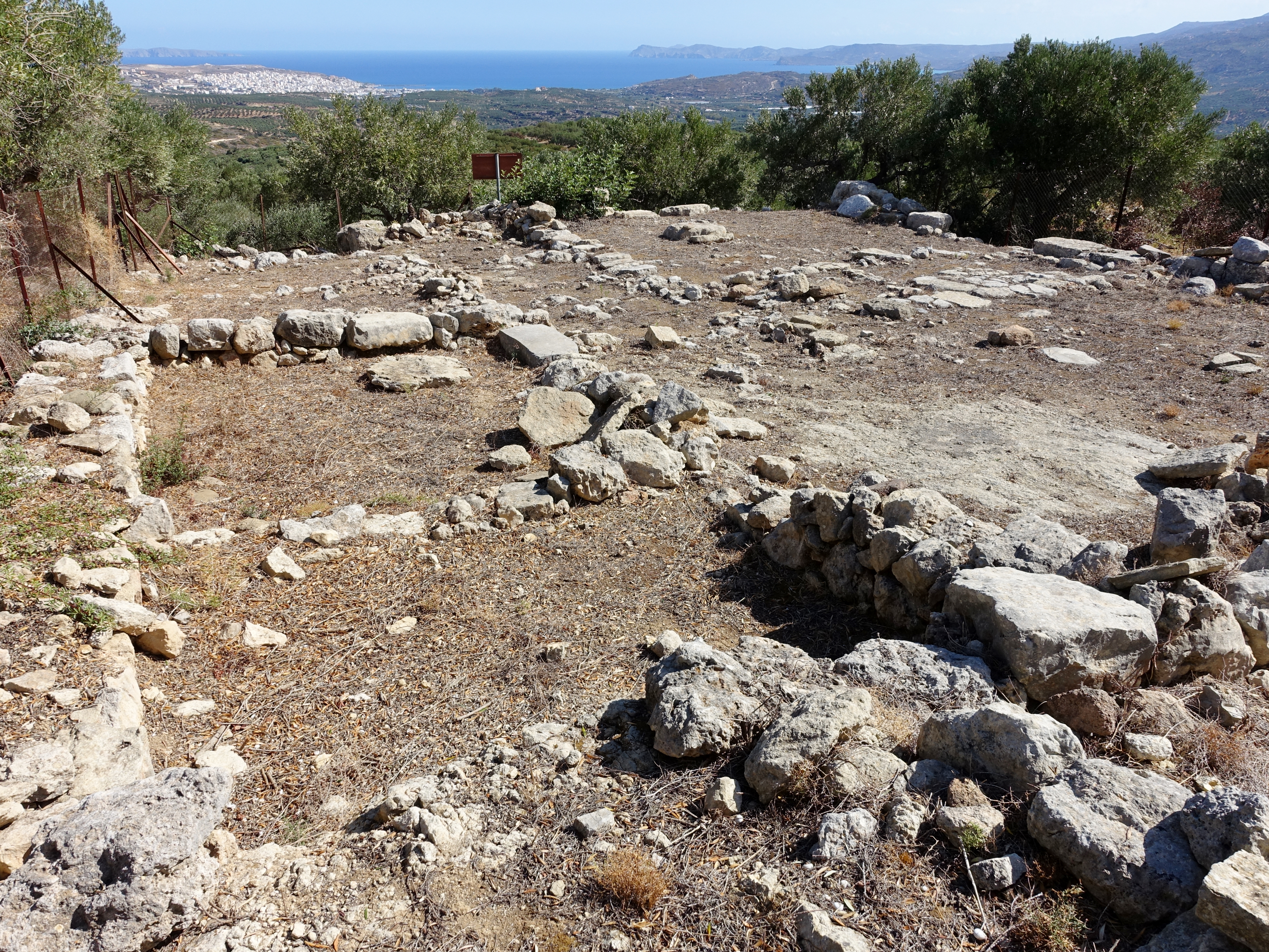
Minoan villa of Achladia

Achladia is the archaeological site of an ancient Minoan villa on eastern Crete.

== Geography ==
The ancient Minoan excavation site is 3 kilometers northeast of the Achladia village, south of Sitia. From the hill on which the houses stand, there is a view of the valley which drains into the Bay of Sitia, as well as the shoreline of the Ornon Mountains' northeast spur.

== Archaeology ==
Achladia was first excavated in 1939 by Nicolas Platon. He conducted subsequent excavations here in 1952 and 1959.

The site is a large building with an area of 270 square meters referred to as House A and a smaller building nearby called House B. Two other Minoan buildings were also found nearby, but were only partially excavated. House A overlooks the entire bay of Siteia.

There is some dispute about the period of use - Nicolas Platon believed that it was built during MMIII, but Lefteris Platon believes there is enough evidence to support the presence of a light well and polythyra (pier-and-door partition), both Late Minoan architectural features. If this is true, then the building would have been constructed during LMIB. Nearby are a LMIIIB tholos tomb at Platyskinos and a LMIII potter's kiln, which may add further contextual evidence for the site's Late Minoan chronology.

Finds excavated from Achladia are at the Heraklion Archaeological Museum and Archaeological Museum of Sitia.

=== House A ===
House A consists of 12 excavated ground-floor rooms, and there is no evidence of an upper floor. Of particular note at the site are the pier-and-door partition connecting Rooms Beta and Gamma, a quern-stone in the kitchen (Room Delta) and a stone slab box in Room Gamma containing an agrimi rhyton.

Evidence indicates that the Achladia buildings were destroyed in a violent earthquake.
