= Sitia =

Town on island of Crete in Greece

Sitia Σητεία
- Municipality
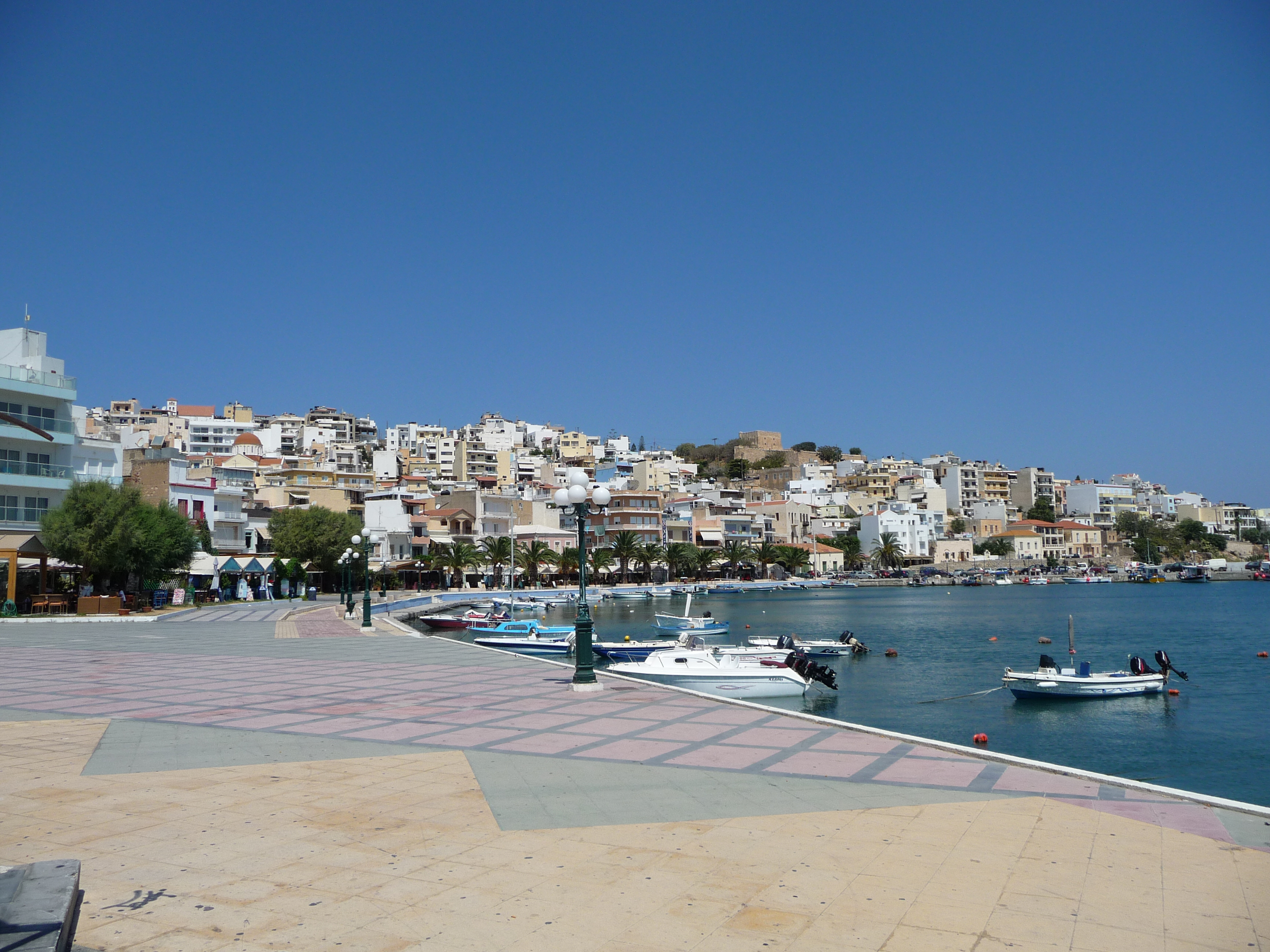

- Seal

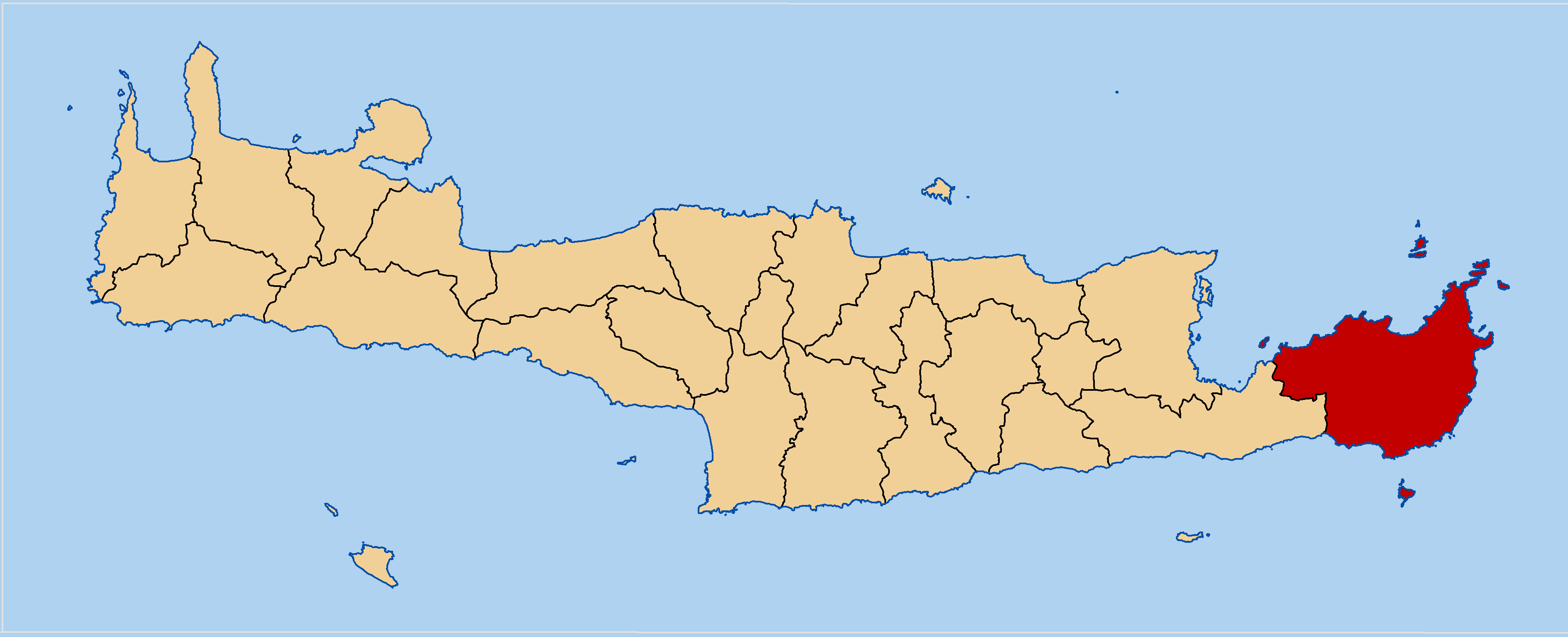

- Location within Greece
- Coordinates: 35°12′N 26°6′E
- Country: Greece
- Administrative region: Crete
- Regional unit: Lasithi

Government
  - Mayor: Georgios Zervakis (since 2019)

Area
  - Municipality: 710.9 km^{2} (274.5 sq mi)
  - Municipal unit: 277.4 km^{2} (107.1 sq mi)
- Highest elevation: 5 m (16 ft)
- Lowest elevation: 0 m (0 ft)

Population (2021)
  - Municipality: 20,438
  - Density: 28.75/km^{2} (74.46/sq mi)
  - Municipal unit: 15,615
  - Municipal unit density: 56.29/km^{2} (145.8/sq mi)
  - Community: 11,166
- Time zone: UTC+2 (EET)
  - Summer (DST): UTC+3 (EEST)
- Postal code: 72x xx
- Area code: 28430
- Vehicle registration: ΑΝ
- Website: www.sitia.gr

Sitia (Latin and Italian) or Siteia (Greek: Σητεία, Siteía [siˈtia]) is a port town and a municipality in Lasithi, Crete, Greece. The town has 11,166 inhabitants and the municipality has 20,438 (2021). It lies east of Agios Nikolaos and northeast of Ierapetra. Sitia's port is on the Sea of Crete, part of the Aegean Sea and is one of the economic centers of the Lasithi region. European route E75 (which ends in Vardø, Norway) starts in Sitia. The town is served by the Sitia Public Airport. It has not experienced the effects of mass tourism even though there is a long beach along the road leading to Vai and several places of historical interest.

== History ==
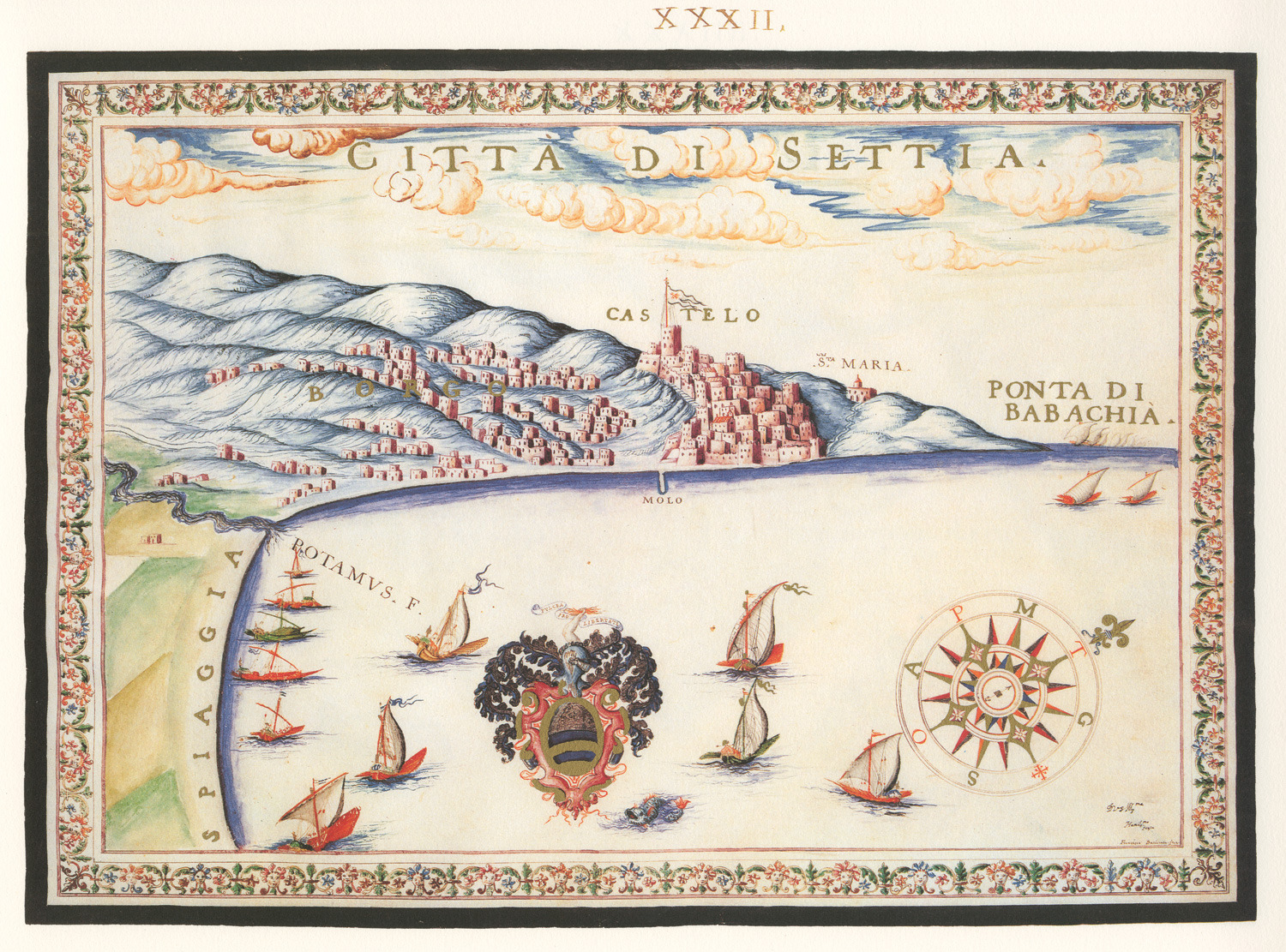
The city of Sitia and the surrounding area by Francesco Basilicata, 1618

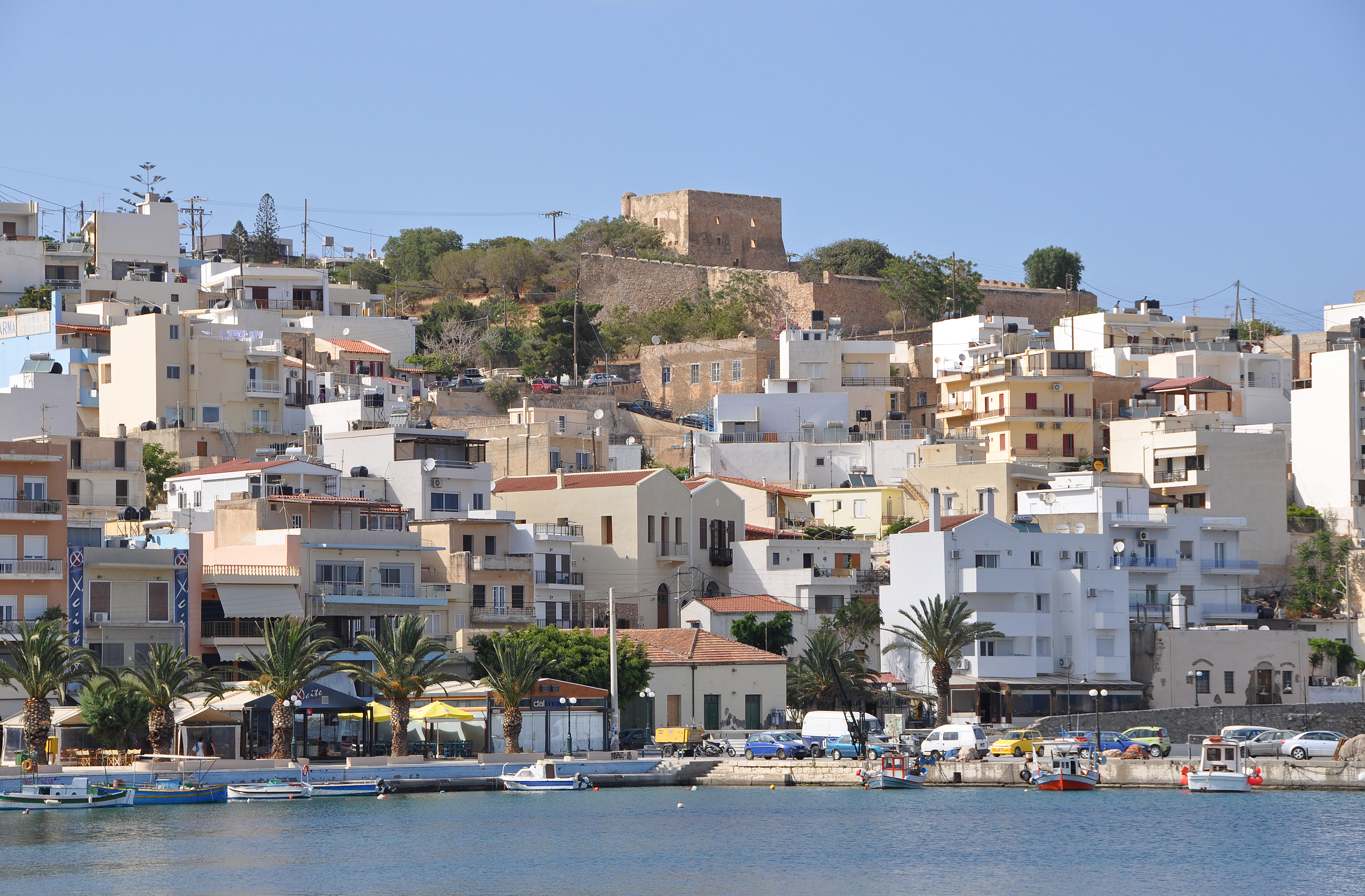
Kazarma fortress at the top

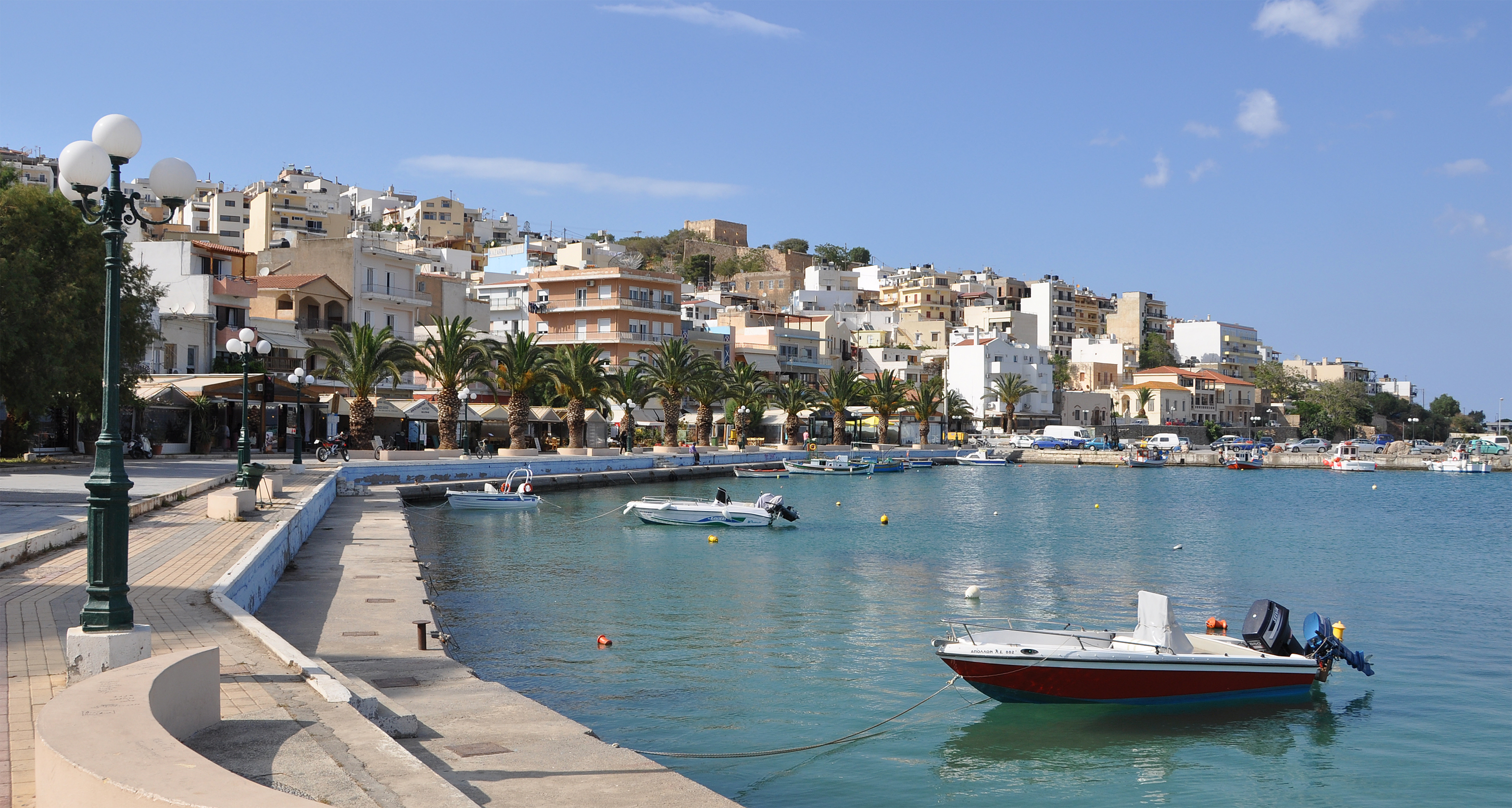
View of the marina

The settlement of the town dates to pre-Minoan times. Excavations in the Petras neighbourhood have found architectural remains from the end of the Neolithic (3000 BC) and continue through the Bronze Age 3000-1050 BC, including the Minoan palace of Petras. Several other Minoan settlements have been found within the municipality, notably Itanos and Mochlos.

According to Diogenes Laërtius, Sitia was the home of Myson of Chen, one of the Seven Sages of Greece.

=== Name ===
The ancient Itia or Etea (Ancient Greek: Ἠτεία, Ēteía) appears to correspond roughly to modern Sitia. The name Siteia itself is probably the result of rebracketing of se (σε, "at") and Ēteía.

=== Ancient Sitia ===
Sitia was founded by Minoans as Itia, and was a place of refuge for native Cretans after the fall of the major Minoan settlements. The city continued to prosper through the Classical, Hellenistic, Roman and Byzantine periods as one of the island's chief ports.

=== Venetian era ===
The town was later expanded and fortified by the Venetians after their acquisition of Crete in 1204, who used it as a base of operations for the Eastern Mediterranean. During the Venetian occupation, the town was destroyed three times: first by an earthquake in 1508, then by the Turkish pirate Hayreddin Barbarossa in 1538, and finally by the Venetians themselves in 1651. This final destruction took place in the context of the Cretan War (1645–1669) in which the Venetians battled to retain their hold on the island against the Ottoman Empire. While Sitia did not fall in the initial Turkish advance, the Venetians did not have the resources to withstand a long siege, and accordingly destroyed the fortifications and removed the garrison to Heraklion. The local inhabitants meanwhile removed westwards to Liopetro and the site was subsequently abandoned for the next 200 years of Turkish rule.

The main remnant of the Venetian occupation is the Kazarma (from Italian casa di arma), the old fortress overlooking the harbour.

=== Modern era ===
After the Venetian period and subsequent abandonment the town was rebuilt until 1870 by the progressive Turkish governor Hüseyin Avni Pasha following the Cretan Revolt. It was subsequently created capital of the Sanjak of Lasit (later Lasithi, which it remains to this day). Under Turkish rule the town was renamed Avniye after its rebuilder, but as the local Greeks continued to use the traditional name of Sitia this innovation did not survive independence. Despite the turbulent history of Crete in leaving the Ottoman Empire and joining Greece, as well as the First World War, the population almost quadrupled between 1881 (570 inhabitants) and 1928 (2,100 inhabitants). Major public works were carried out by the Greek government in 1911 to modernise the town, in the course of which much of the Ottoman era town was rebuilt, as well as a fresh water supply.

== Geography ==
=== Municipality ===
The municipality Sitia was formed at the 2010 local government reform by the merger of the three former municipalities Itanos, Lefki and Sitia, which became municipal units. In November 2011, Sitia incorporated the four communities Chrysopigi, Lithines, Perivolakia and Pefkoi, which had previously been part of the municipality Ierapetra. In 2014, these communities were grouped into the new municipal unit Analipsi.

The municipality Sitia consists of the following municipal units and communities:

- Analipsi (Chrysopigi, Lithines, Pefkoi, Perivolakia)
- Itanos (Karydi, Palaikastro, Zakros)
- Lefki (Agia Triada, Apidia, Armenoi, Chandras, Pappagiannades, Ziros)
- Sitia (Achladia, Agios Georgios, Chamezi, Exo Mouliana, Katsidoni, Krya, Lastros, Maronia, Mesa Mouliana, Myrsini, Piskokefalo, Praisos, Roussa Ekklisia, Sitia, Sfaka, Skopi, Stavromenos, Tourloti)

The municipality has an area of 627 km^{2} (242 sq mi), the municipal unit 277 km^{2} (107 sq mi).

=== Province ===
Sitia Province or Eparchy (Επαρχία Σητείας, Eparkhía Siteías) was one of the provinces of Lasithi. Its territory corresponded with that of the current municipality Sitia and the municipal unit Makry Gialos. It was abolished in 2006.

=== Environmentally protected areas ===
There are a number of sites in the municipality of Sitia that are protected as National Parks, Aesthetic Forests, Wildlife Refuges etc. under national and international laws. Sitia is home to the Sitia UNESCO Global Geopark. Notable examples are:

- Dionysades Islands which carry many rare and endangered plant species and also serve as a refuge of several animal species (mostly birds and small reptiles), including the falcon, Falco eleonorae, which finds sanctuary here.
- Vai palm forest.
- Richtis Gorge and waterfall.

=== Climate ===
Sitia has a hot-summer Mediterranean climate (Köppen climate classification: Csa) with hot, dry summers and mild, rainy winters.

Climate data for Sitia (1960–2010)
Month	Jan	Feb	Mar	Apr	May	Jun	Jul	Aug	Sep	Oct	Nov	Dec	Year
Mean daily maximum °C (°F)	15.2 (59.4)	15.3 (59.5)	16.9 (62.4)	19.9 (67.8)	23.5 (74.3)	27.1 (80.8)	28.4 (83.1)	28.4 (83.1)	26.5 (79.7)	23.5 (74.3)	20.1 (68.2)	16.9 (62.4)	21.8 (71.2)
Daily mean °C (°F)	12.2 (54.0)	12.2 (54.0)	13.7 (56.7)	16.6 (61.9)	20.3 (68.5)	24.1 (75.4)	25.9 (78.6)	25.8 (78.4)	23.6 (74.5)	20.3 (68.5)	16.9 (62.4)	13.9 (57.0)	18.8 (65.8)
Mean daily minimum °C (°F)	9.7 (49.5)	9.5 (49.1)	10.5 (50.9)	12.8 (55.0)	15.9 (60.6)	19.9 (67.8)	22.6 (72.7)	22.7 (72.9)	20.4 (68.7)	17.3 (63.1)	14.0 (57.2)	11.4 (52.5)	15.6 (60.1)
Average precipitation mm (inches)	92.6 (3.65)	71.0 (2.80)	49.0 (1.93)	23.3 (0.92)	12.1 (0.48)	2.2 (0.09)	0.2 (0.01)	0.8 (0.03)	16.2 (0.64)	50.2 (1.98)	59.5 (2.34)	91.8 (3.61)	468.9 (18.46)
Average precipitation days	13.1	11.3	8.8	5.0	3.0	0.8	0.1	0.3	1.7	5.7	8.2	12.4	70.4
Average relative humidity (%)	71.6	70.0	68.3	64.1	62.3	60.4	61.5	63.5	65.9	69.4	70.9	71.8	66.6
Source: Hellenic National Meteorological Service

== Infrastructure ==
The municipality of Sitia is served by the Sitia Public Airport which offers several domestic destinations. The first landing occurred on June 7, 1984 and the airport opened officially on June 9, 1984. Construction of new building facilities that included a control tower was completed in May 1993. Runway and apron extension works were finished in May 2003. In 2011, the local authorities completed negotiations with international travel agents for organising regular charter flights starting in May 2012. The same year, local officials negotiationed with the low-cost airline Ryanair.

In addition, Sitia is served by a port which connects Sitia and eastern Crete with several other Greek islands as well as with the port of Piraeus. The town also has a marina which accommodates smaller fishing boats and yachts.

=== Health services ===
Sitia General Hospital was founded in 1947 as a local health center and was later (1994) relocated to a new 7500m^{2} (110-bed capacity) building and accordingly upgraded to serve as the main hospital for the municipality of Sitia and the surrounding area.

== Culture ==
=== Attractions ===
- Moni Toplou, founded in the mid 15th century, is one of the most significant monasteries in Crete.
- Kazarma fortress, in the town of Sitia.
- Gorge of the Dead (at Kato Zakros).
- Archaeological Museum of Sitia.
- Folkor Museum of Sitia.
- Various archeological sites with Minoan civilization settlements from the Bronze Age, such as in Itanos and Mochlos.

=== Notable people ===
- Yannis Hamilakis - archaeologist
- Myson - philosopher (one of the 7 legendary wise men of ancient Greece)
- Vitsentzos Kornaros - poet (composer of Erotokritos)
- Giorgos Mazonakis - singer
- Jenny Hiloudaki - DJ
- Manousos - Musician (bassist of Psofioi Korioi Band)
