= Kazarma fortress =

Venetian-era fortress of the city of Sitia in Crete, Greece

Coordinates: 35.2111°N 26.1075°E

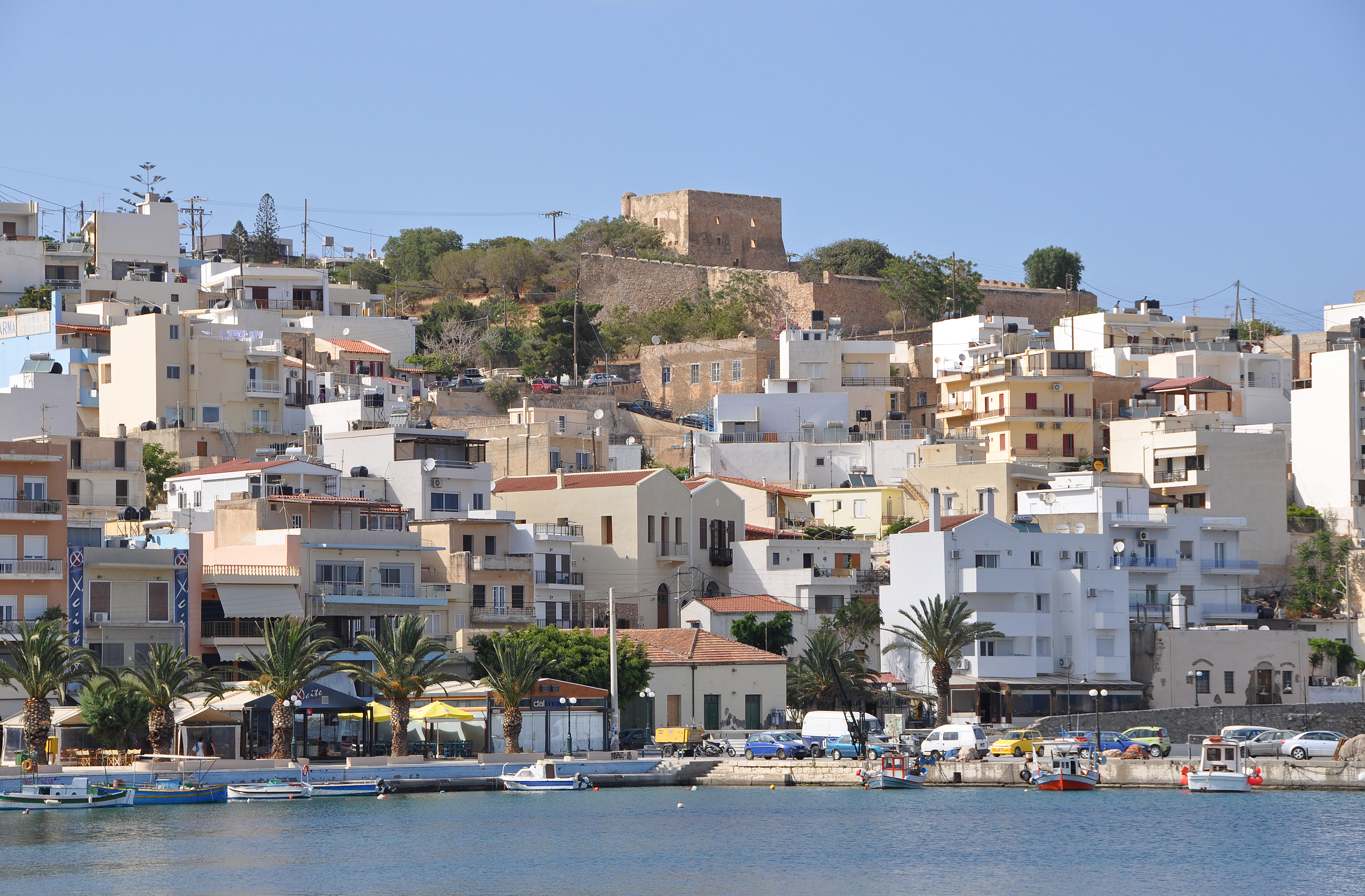
Kazarma at the top

Kazarma (Greek: Καζάρμα) (from Italian: Casa di arma, "the guard barracks") is the Venetian-era fortress of the city of Sitia in Crete, Greece. This fortress was built in the 13th Century during Venetian rule on Crete. The Venetians abandoned the town in 1651 and destroyed parts of the fortress to prevent its use by the Turks.
