= Richtis Gorge =

Gorge in Crete, Greece

- Faraggi tou Richti
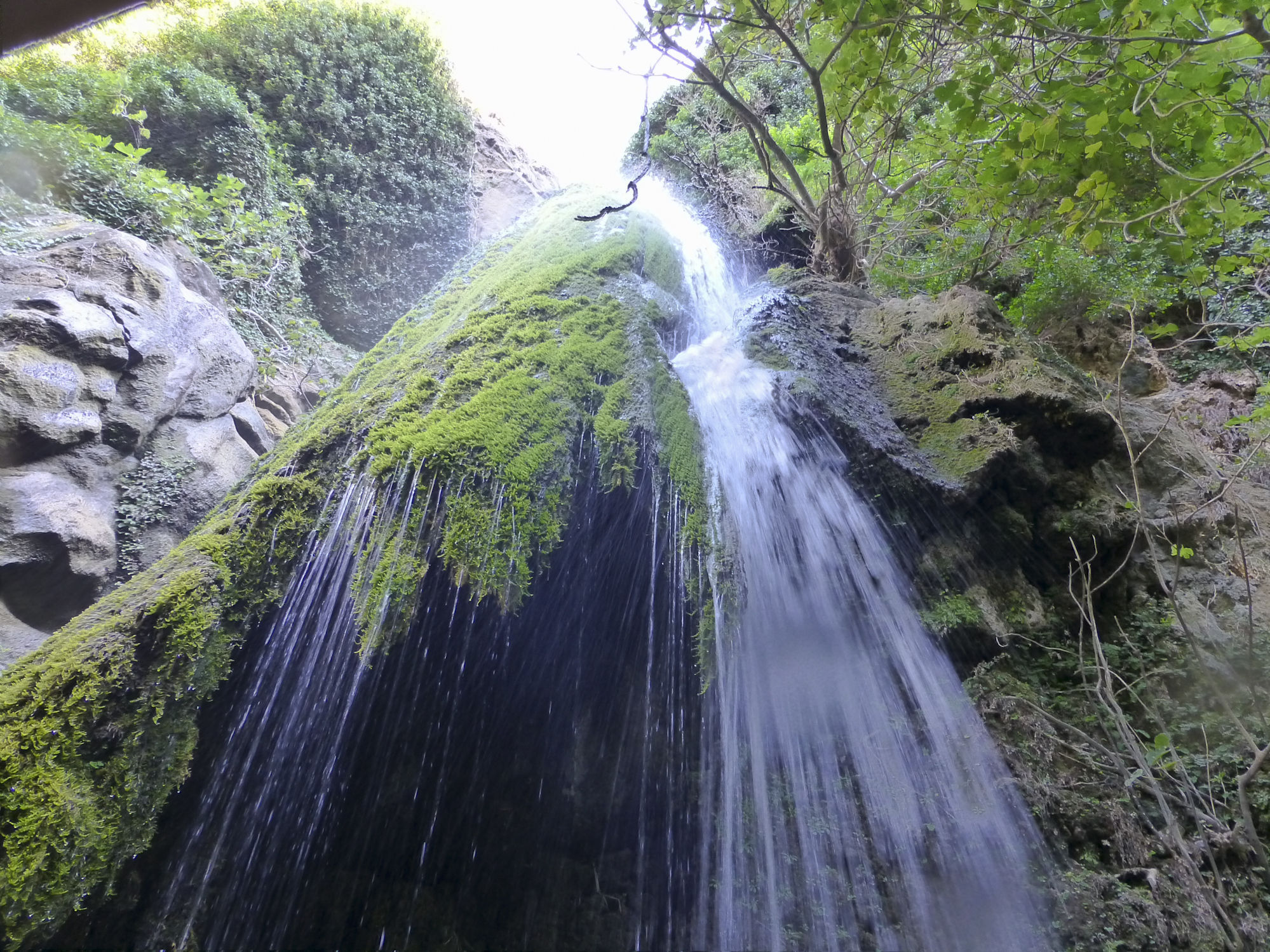
- Richtis waterfall

- Location within Crete
- Length: 5 km (3.1 mi)
- Depth: 20 m (66 ft)

Naming
- Native name: Φαράγγι του Ρίχτη (Greek)
- English translation: Waterfall Gorge

Geology
- Type: Gorge

Geography
- Country: Greece
- State/Province: Crete
- Coordinates: 35.1642°N 25.9889°E
- Interactive map of Richtis Gorge

Richtis Gorge (Greek: Φαράγγι του Ρίχτη, Faraggi tou Richti) is a gorge in Crete, Greece (Map of Richtis Gorge here). It is a state protected park near Exo Mouliana, Sitia, eastern Crete (Greece) that starts at the traditional village Exo Mouliana, which is located on the national road between Agios Nikolaos and Sitia and ends at the secluded Richtis beach, just east of the village Kalavros. The hiking trail is about 4 km in length of moderate (spring/summer/autumn) to hard (winter) difficulty. Elevation difference between the starting point and the beach is about 350 meters. Rich vegetation (mainly platanus trees, wild berries and local flowers and herbs) and animal life (mainly local species of butterflies, small reptiles, birds and small mammals) can be observed along the way, as well as old stone bridges and water mills before it culminates with the Richtis Waterfall and beach, making Richtis gorge trail one of the most diversified hiking experiences in Crete.

== Etymology ==
"Richtis" in Cretan dialect means "waterfall".

== Hiking the gorge ==
There are several options:

- Walk down the gorge and return to the village the same way via the gorge (about 5 h total). If with a car, parking at Lachana bridge and starting the descent from there will save about 20 min walking each way.
- Walk down the road to the beach and walk up the gorge back to the village (about 4 h total). The opposite (down the gorge and up the road) is not recommended on a sunny day because the road is not shaded and you will be walking uphill and under the sun, the gorge however is almost entirely shaded.
- Drive to the beach (15 min) and walk the gorge until the waterfall (about 1/3 of the total length of the gorge), return to the beach and drive back to the village (the "lazy" way, about 2.5 h total)
- Drive 2 cars to the beach, drive back with one car, walk down the gorge and drive back to the village with the other car (about 4 h total). Alternatively, arrange with someone to pick you up from the beach and drive you to the village.

Times are given with the assumption that the gorge is walked at very slow pace and with at least one stop.

== Photo gallery (on Flickr) ==
- Richtis gorge in Crete 1
- Richtis gorge and waterfall in Crete 2
- Richtis gorge in Crete 3

== See also ==
- List of waterfalls
