= Jenny Hiloudaki =

Greek model

Jenny Hiloudaki Τζένη Χειλουδάκη
- Born: February 21, 1968 (age 58); Sitia, Crete, Greece
- Modeling information
- Hair color: Blond

Jenny Hiloudaki (Greek: Τζένη Χειλουδάκη) (born February 21, 1968) is a Greek DJ, book author who regularly attracted the attention of the Greek media. Her affair with a district attorney caused a national scandal.

== Early life ==
Hiloudaki was born in Sitia on the Greek island of Crete and was named Yiannis (Greek for "John"), in honor of her deceased father, who had drowned at sea when attempting to rescue a woman. At an early age, she identified the need to pursue a gender transition and was able to obtain female hormones at the age of thirteen. The name "Jenny" was chosen to honor her sister, Eugenia, who supported their family when they moved to Athens. Hiloudaki went on to complete sex reassignment surgery at Charing Cross Hospital, in the United Kingdom, when she was twenty years old.

== Scandal ==
Hiloudaki's 1997 affair with District Attorney Giorgos Sakellaropoulos, who met her while inspecting brothels in Rhodes, resulted in a national scandal. The scandal and publicity was intended by Hiloudaki, and once Sakellaropoulos discovered she was transgender, he left her to return to his family. The affair is the only one of Hiloudaki relationship's that has been closely followed by the media.

== Career ==
After sex reassignment surgery, Hiloudaki became a top model in Greece, working with many Greek models and doing photoshoots for multiple Greek magazines. She had also modelled on a catwalk in Italy and was photographed next to Italian actress Sophia Loren. Hiloudaki was voted "Greek Woman of the Year" in 2000.

== Books ==
In 2002, she released her first autobiography E Zoe mou: E Aggeli den Ehoun Fylo (My life: Angels Have No Gender) ISBN 960-8086-46-9, which was also released as a comic book called JennyX in the same year. In 2003, she released her second autobiography, I Mavri Vivlos (The Black Bible) ISBN 978-960-8086-56-2.

== Television appearances ==
Hiloudaki has appeared on several Greek television shows. Perhaps one of her most memorable TV appearances is the one on Tatiana Stefanidou's TV show Yalinos Tihos, in 2002, on which she had been invited to talk about her then-newly released book. During the conversation with Stefanidou, Greek singer Julia Barka, who was also a guest at the show and intended to release her own book after some months, interrupted the conversation when Hiloudaki said that Barka had not even started writing her book. Right after, Barka started talking with Hiloudaki and the new conversation was intense, while profanities were used.

In 2006, Hiloudaki appeared on another TV show hosted by Stefanidou, entitled Apokalypsi Tora. On the show, she complained that residents of Sitia were accusing her of working as a prostitute and organising sexual orgies. They boycotted the café-restaurant she owns at Sitia, trying to drive her out of business. She denied doing such things and claimed that the rumours were started out of prejudice; patrons of her café-restaurant complained about even such minor things as the ambient music. Hiloudaki also claimed that many rumours were started by a lesbian student who was attracted to her and who decided to exact her revenge upon discovering that the feeling was not mutual.

== Later life ==
Hiloudaki has owned residences in Athens, Rhodes and Crete. Today she lives on Sitia with her dogs and cats and a bird named "Kitsos". In her spare time, she enjoys collecting antiques and Swatch watches.
