= Lefki, Lasithi =

Former municipality in Crete, Greece

Lefki Λεύκη
- Municipal unit
- Location within the regional unit

- Location within Greece
- Coordinates: 35°03′N 26°08′E
- Country: Greece
- Administrative region: Crete
- Regional unit: Lasithi
- Municipality: Siteia

Area
  - Municipal unit: 152.3 km^{2} (58.8 sq mi)

Population (2021)
  - Municipal unit: 1,466
  - Municipal unit density: 9.626/km^{2} (24.93/sq mi)
- Time zone: UTC+2 (EET)
  - Summer (DST): UTC+3 (EEST)
- Vehicle registration: AN

Lefki (Greek: Λεύκη) is a former municipality in the Lasithi regional unit, eastern Crete, Greece. Since the 2011 local government reform it is part of the municipality Sitia, of which it is a municipal unit. The municipal unit has an area of 152.303 km^{2} (58.805 sq mi). Population 1,466 (2021). The seat of the municipality was in Ziros.

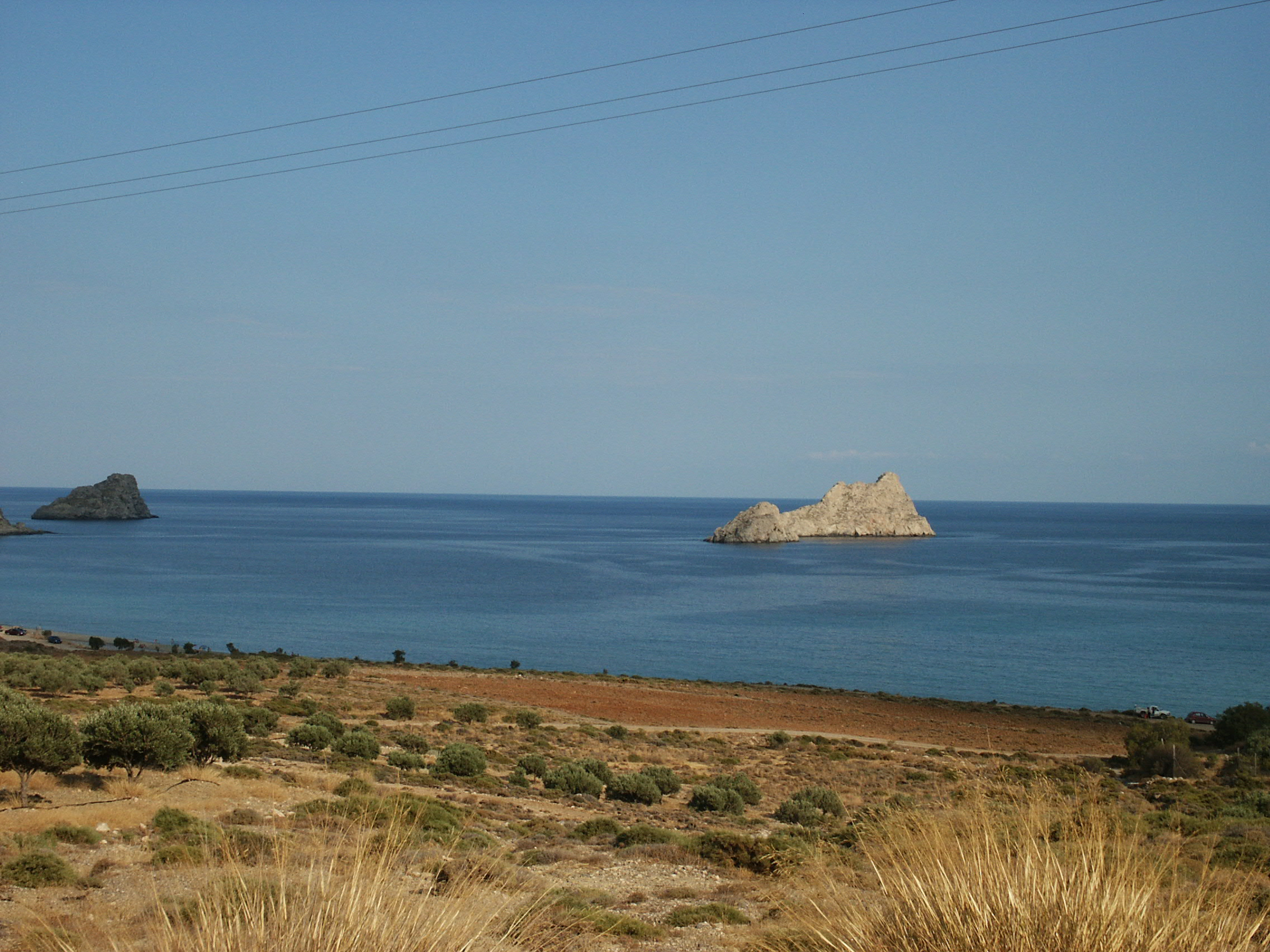
Three islets in the Kavaloi group in Lefki. Two islets on the right are close together and look like one

Kavaloi (Greek: Καβάλοι), is a group of three uninhabited islets, close to the coast of Lasithi. The group comprises the islets Anavatis (Αναβάτης "rider"), Kavallos (Καβάλλος), and Kefali (Κεφαλή "head"). Administratively the islets are part of the Lefki municipal unit.
