= Archaeological Museum of Sitia =

Museum in Greece

- Αρχαιολογικό Μουσείο Σητείας
- Location: Sitia, Crete, Greece
- Coordinates: 35.2046°N 26.1053°E
- Type: Archaeological
- Collections: Minoan civilization artifacts

The Archaeological Museum of Sitia is a museum in Sitia of Crete, in Greece. Its collection consists of Minoan-era finds from Sitia, Zakros, Petra and Palaikastro.

== See also ==
- Palaikastro Kouros
