= Ziros, Lasithi =

Ziros Ζίρος
- Community
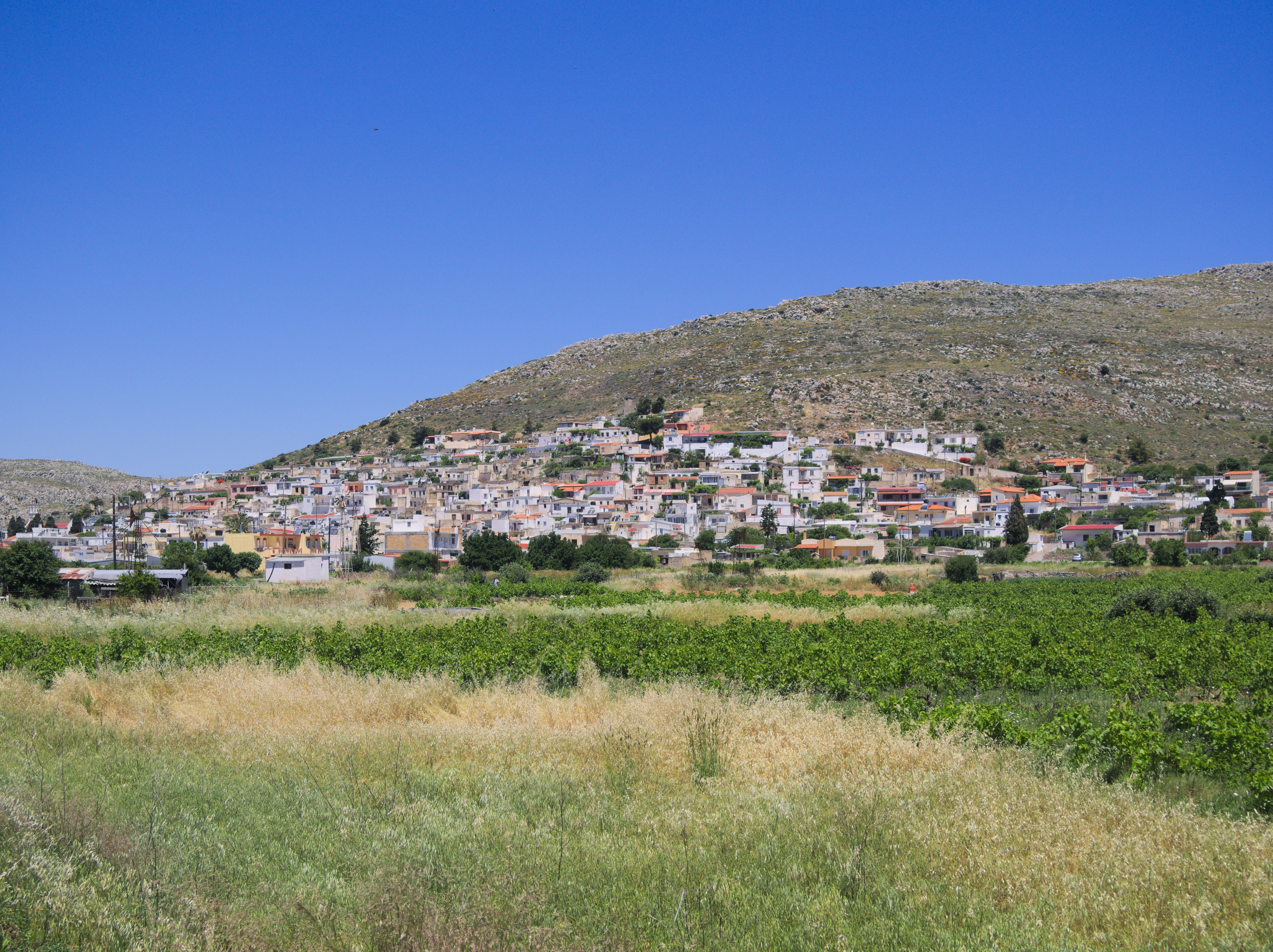

- Location within Greece
- Coordinates: 35°05′N 26°08′E
- Country: Greece
- Administrative region: Crete
- Regional unit: Lasithi
- Municipality: Siteia
- Municipal unit: Lefki

Population (2021)
  - Community: 399
- Time zone: UTC+2 (EET)
  - Summer (DST): UTC+3 (EEST)

Ziros (Greek: Ζίρος) is a village in the municipality Sitia, Lasithi regional unit, Crete, Greece. It was the seat of government for the former municipality Lefki.

The village of Ziros is 30 kilometers south of Sitia on the Sitia - Piskokefalo - Epano Episkopi - Chandras - Ziros road. There are a number of Byzantine churches in the area.
