= Efstratios Manousakis =

American (of Greek origin) physicist

Efstratios Manousakis (born July 11, 1957) is the Donald Robson Distinguished Professor of Physics at the Florida State University. He is known for his contributions in the area of condensed matter physics. Among his works is his contribution to our understanding of the parent compound of the high-temperature cuprate superconductors, which played a role in founding the relatively new field of quantum magnetism.

== Early life and education ==
Efstratios Manousakis was born on July 11, 1957, in Ithaca, Greece. He earned his undergraduate degree in 1980 from the University of Athens in Greece. He completed his doctorate in 1985 at the University of Illinois under the supervision of V. R. Pandharipande and David Pines.

== Career ==
From 1985-1987 he was a postdoctoral associate at the Center for Theoretical Physics at the Massachusetts Institute of Technology.In 1987 he was hired at the Florida State University, first, at the Supercomputer Computations Research Institute and from 1988 as a Faculty in Physics.

== Research ==
Manousakis demonstrated that the ground-state of the spin-1/2 Heisenberg antiferromagnet on the square lattice, unlike previous suggestions by Phil Anderson that it is a resonating valence bond state, is instead characterized by long-range antiferromagnetic order. This happens despite the large-amplitude quantum-spin fluctuations expected to be present due to fact that we are dealing with low-spin and low-dimensionality. He also demonstrated that the behavior of the spin-fluctuations in the parent compounds of the high-temperature cuprate-superconductors can be described by the spin-1/2 square-lattice quantum antiferromagnetic Heisenberg model. Manousakis' calculations have also illuminated the nature and propagation of the hole quasi-particle in quantum antiferromagnets as a spin-polaron or as a string and these works have more recently found further application in the area of ultra-cold atoms.

In 2010, he has proposed that efficient solar cells could be made using strongly correlated materials utilizing the concept of carrier multiplication via impact ionization. This idea has recently received theoretical and experimental attention.

He has calculated the quasi-particle phonon-roton spectrum in superfluid ^{4}He that introduce corrections to previous calculations by Feynman and Cohen. This is discussed by David Pines in the book entitled Most of the Good Stuff: Memories of Richard Feynman.

Manousakis has also worked on the nature of consciousness and its possible relation to quantum theory.

== Awards and honors ==
In 2017 he was elected fellow of the American Academy of Arts and Sciences, in 2002 named fellow of the American Physical Society and in 2008 named Fellow of the Institute of Physics.
