= Analipsi, Lasithi =

Analipsi Ανάληψη
- Municipal unit
- Location within Greece
- Coordinates: 35°02′25″N 25°58′55″E
- Country: Greece
- Administrative region: Crete
- Regional unit: Lasithi
- Municipality: Siteia

Area
  - Municipal unit: 83.9 km^{2} (32.4 sq mi)

Population (2021)
  - Municipal unit: 1,343
  - Municipal unit density: 16.0/km^{2} (41.5/sq mi)
- Time zone: UTC+2 (EET)
  - Summer (DST): UTC+3 (EEST)

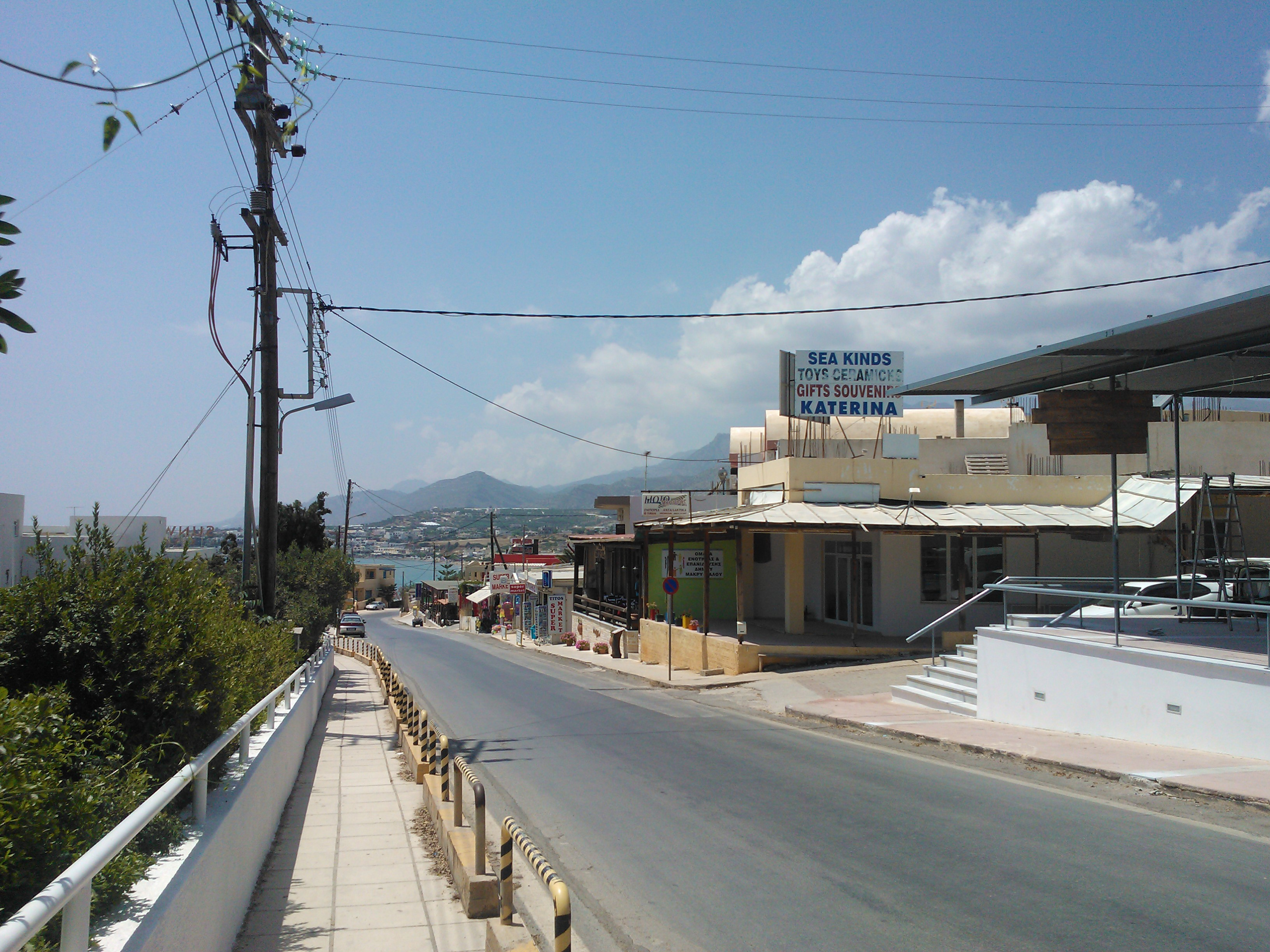
Street View in Analipsis

Analipsi (Greek: Ανάληψη) is a village and a municipal unit of the municipality Siteia in the Lasithi regional unit, eastern Crete, Greece. The municipal unit was established in 2014 from the four communities Chrysopigi, Lithines, Perivolakia and Pefkoi, which had been part of the municipality Ierapetra before 2011. The municipal unit has an area of 83.853 km^{2} (32.376 sq mi). Population 1,343 (2021).
