= Mochlos =

Island in Greece

Native name: Μόχλος
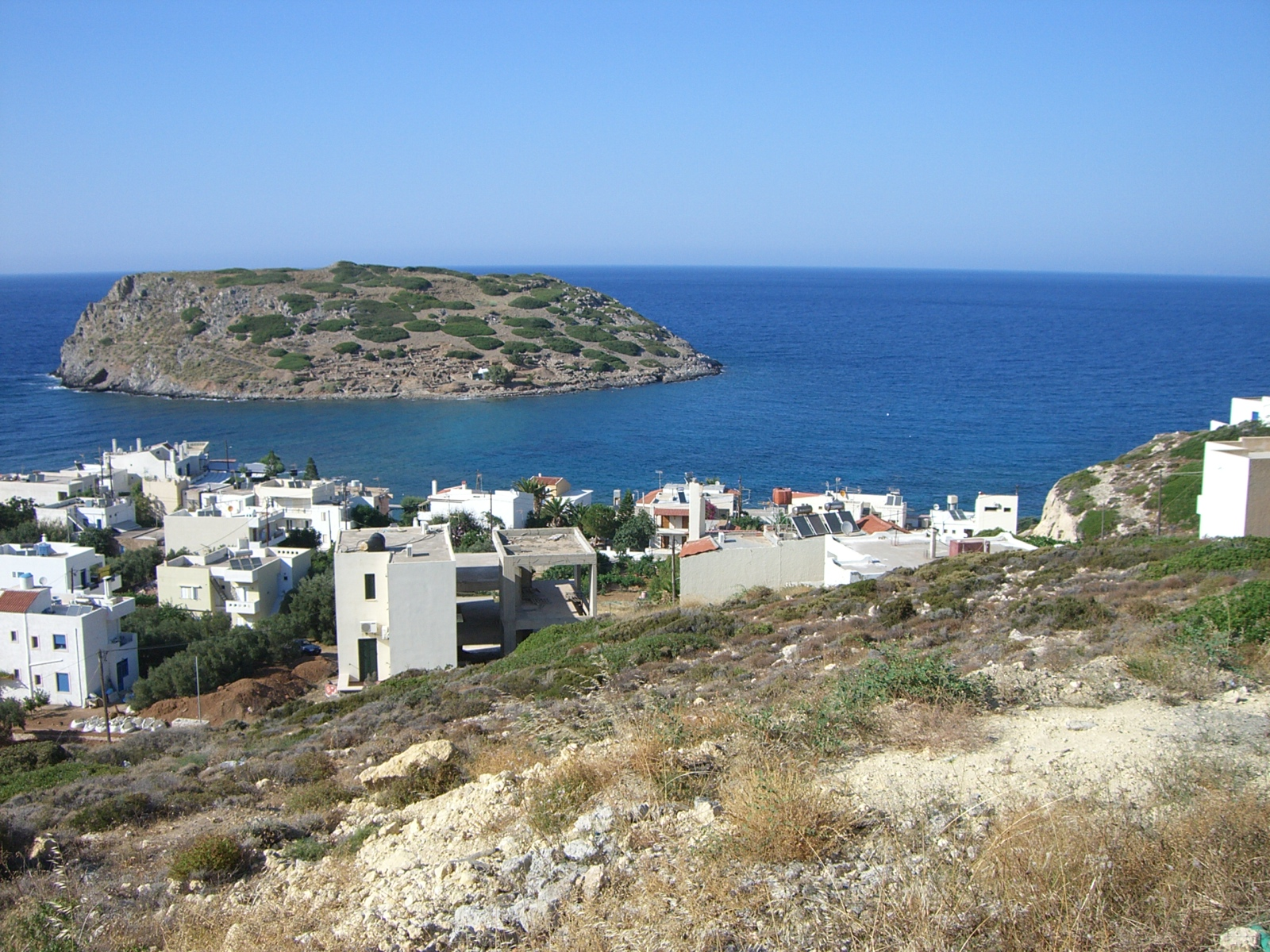
- The island of Mochlos with town in the foreground
- Interactive map of Mochlos

Geography
- Coordinates: 35°11′15″N 25°54′27″E
- Archipelago: Cretan Islands

Administration
- Greece
- Region: Crete
- Regional unit: Lasithi
- Capital city: Mochlos, Crete

Demographics
- Population: 250 (2021)

Mochlos (Greek: Μόχλος) is a small, uninhabited island in the Gulf of Mirabello in eastern Crete, and the archaeological site of an ancient Minoan settlement. There is evidence that Mochlos was not an island in Minoan times, but was attached to the mainland and acted as an eastern harbor.

The name Mochlos also applies to the small fishing village and resort located on the main island of Crete, opposite Mochlos island. Only 150 metres separates them. The island is administered from Tourloti which is only 9 km (6 mi) away.

== Archaeology ==
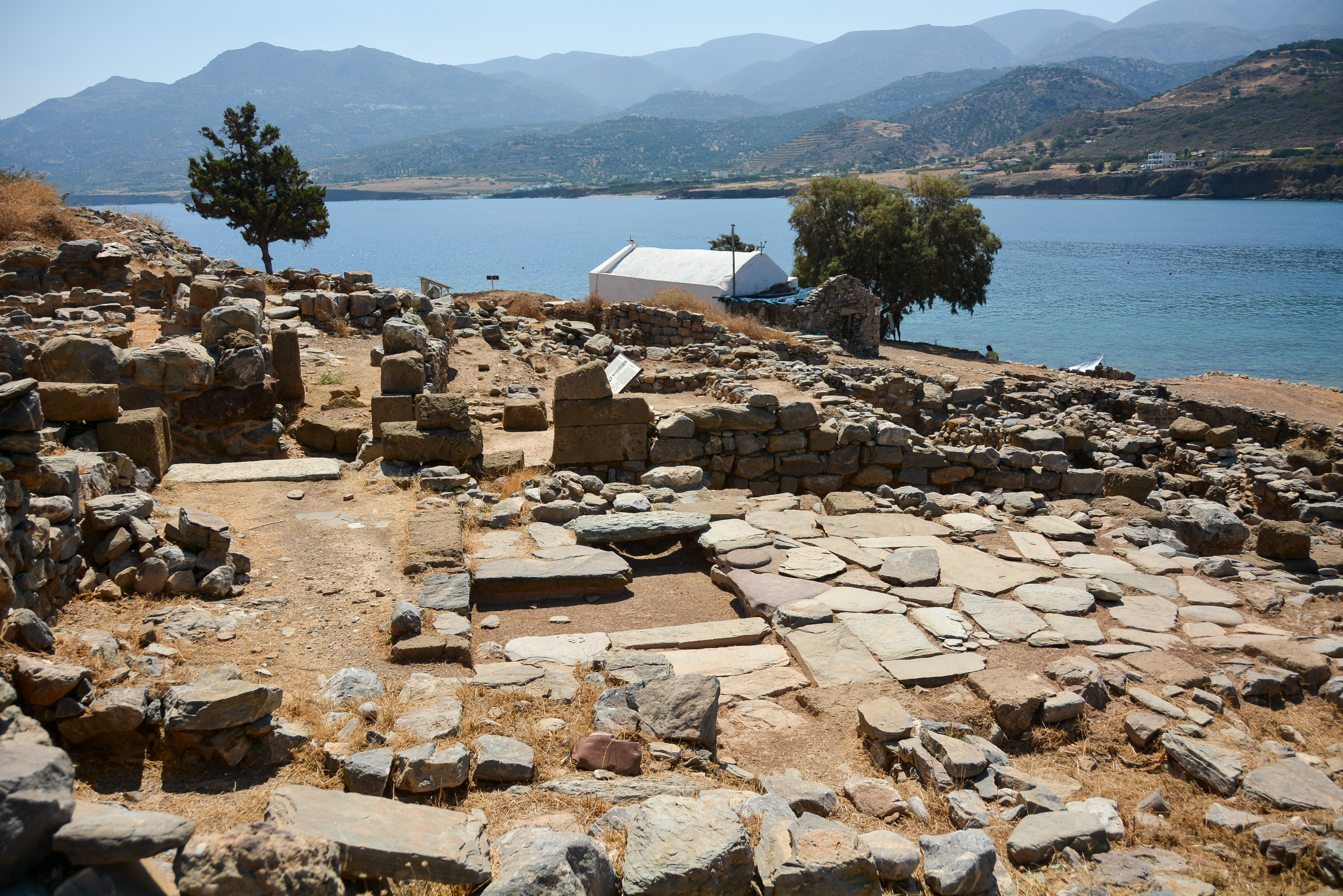
The Minoan settlement of Mochlos

Mochlos was first excavated by Richard Seager in 1908 at the western end of the island, where a prepalatial cemetery was found. At that time, tombs, pithos burials and pit graves were uncovered, as well as two large tombs at the western tip of the island. In the 1970s, Jeffrey Soles documented the tombs and cemetery uncovered by Seager. The cemetery was in use from Early Minoan I to Middle Minoan IA.

According to Keith Branigan,

"On present evidence, Mochlos was one of the largest Early Minoan settlements in Crete, much smaller than Knossos or Malia, but comparable to Phaistos and perhaps Palaikastro, and certainly much larger than Myrtos, or Vasiliki."

The modern excavations in the area began in 1989. Organized as a Greek-American excavation under the auspices of the American School of Classical Studies in Athens, it is one of the longest Greek-American collaborations in the history of the School. Professors Jeffrey S. Soles from the University of North Carolina at Greensboro and Costis Davaras from the University of Athens are co-directors. It has uncovered remains dating from 3100 BC to the 10th century AD, including a Minoan town of the Neopalatial period (c. 1700-1430 BC), a Mycenaean village and its cemetery (c. 1400-1250 BC), and a Late Hellenistic settlement of the 2nd and 1st centuries BC. Details are to be found on the project's website.

In addition to the Minoan town on the island, two buildings were uncovered behind the modern village of Mochlos. Both are artisans' quarters belonging to the Minoan town. One was used for crafting bronze, ivory and stone. The other was for making pottery. The Mycenaean cemetery was excavated above the artisans' quarter on the hill above, and a Minoan farmhouse was uncovered at Chalinomouri at the far eastern end of the Mochlos plain. Some excavations continue, but the core work on the project is study and publication of data.

=== Metalwork ===
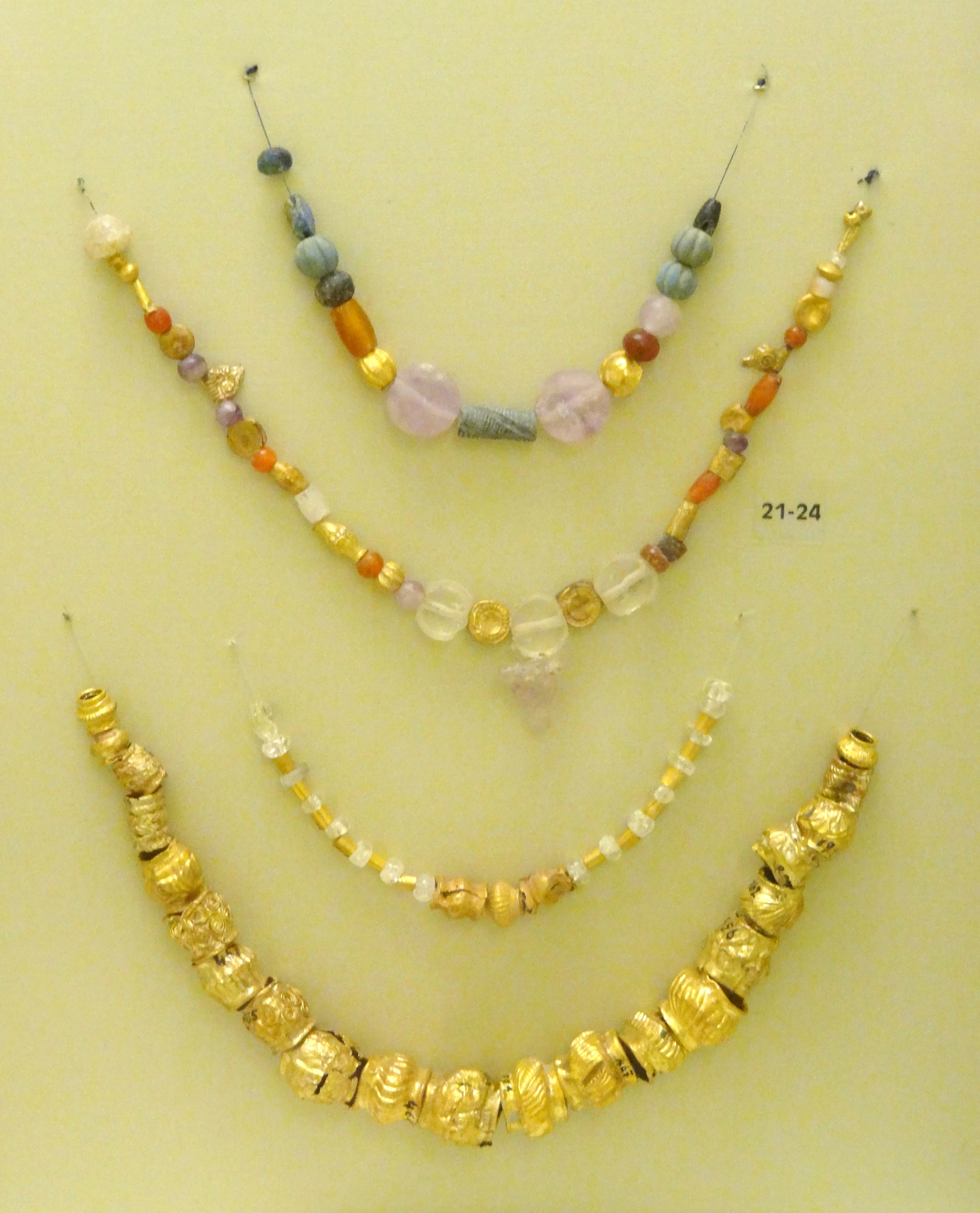
Minoan gold necklaces, 2500-1500 BC, from Mochlos and Platanos

Ten Late Minoan I metal hoards were recently excavated at Mochlos. Among them are foundry hoards, traders' hoards and ceremonial assemblages. Lead isotope analyses indicate that copper oxhide ingots and fragments from these hoards originated in Cyprus.

Large quantities of Early Minoan gold jewelry were excavated at Mochlos in 1908 and are on display in the Heraklion Museum. More recent finds are displayed in the Hagios Nikolaos and Siteia museums.

== List of Minoan sites on Mochlos ==
- EMI-MMIA cemetery, western Mochlos
- EMIB-LMIB settlement, southern Mochlos
- LMIB artisans' quarters, near Mochlos
- LMIB building, eastern Mochlos, at Chalinomouri
- LMIII settlement
- LMIII cemetery

== Photos ==
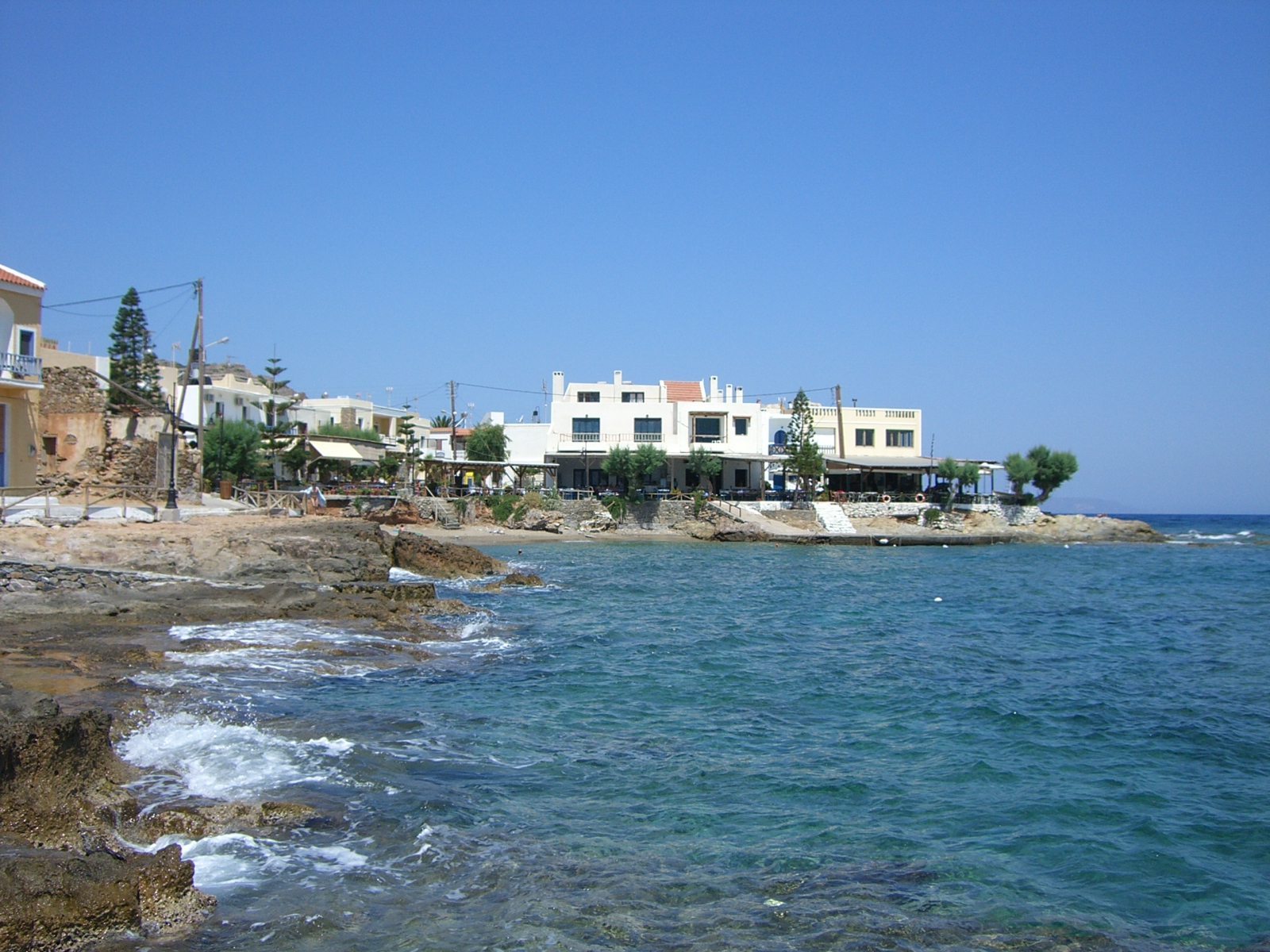
Mochlos beach

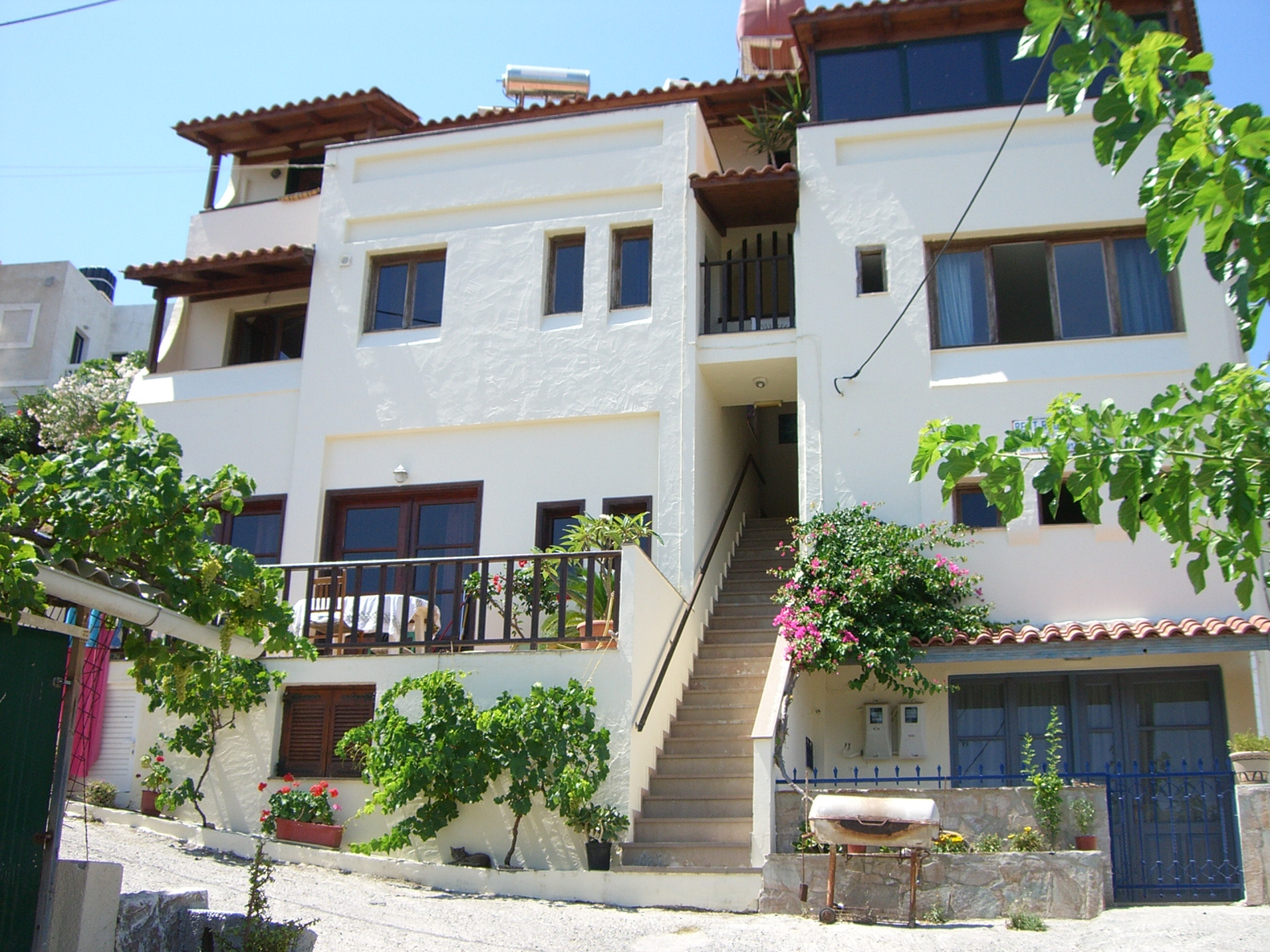
Highest village building

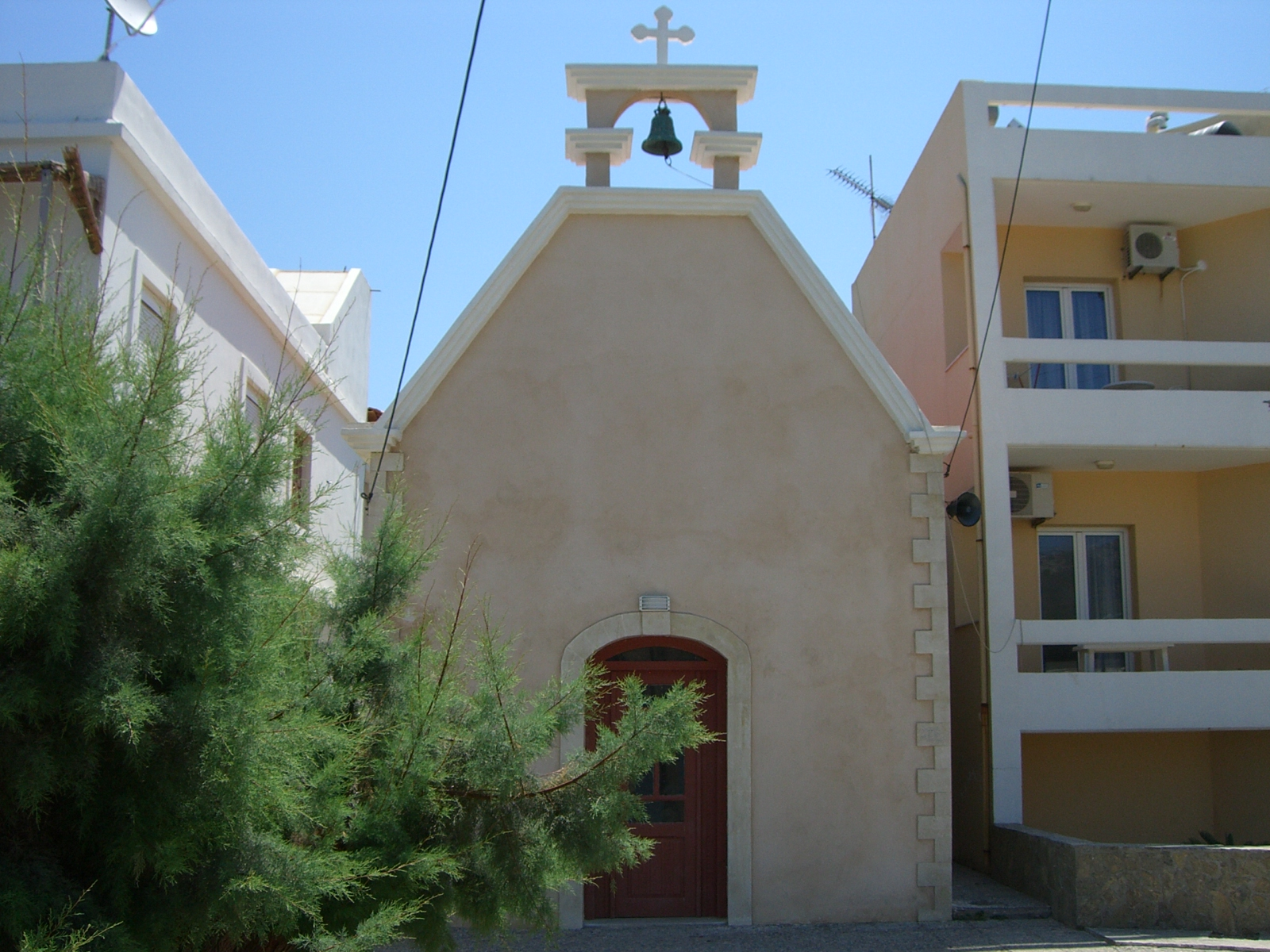
Church Agios Titos

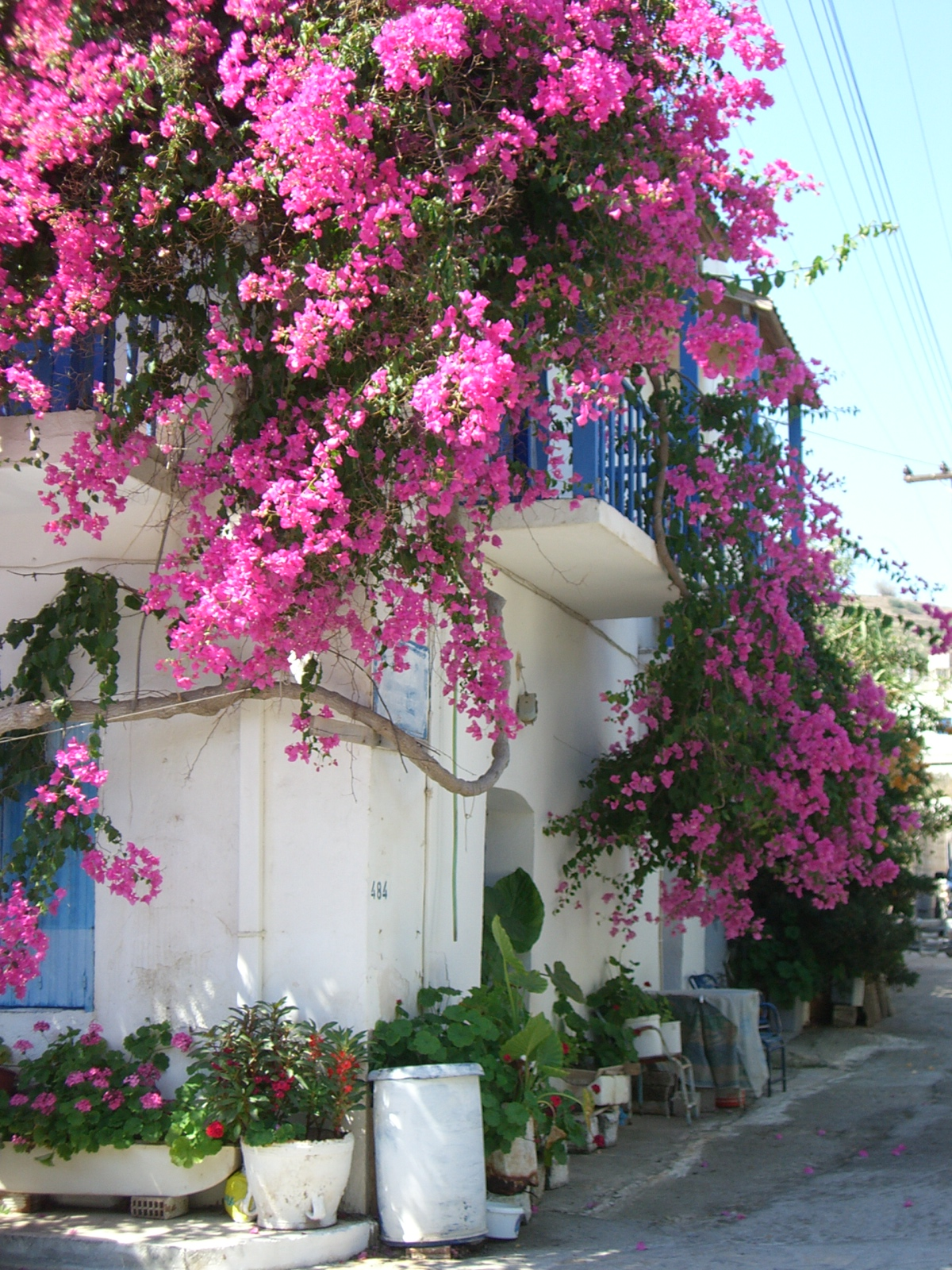
Street

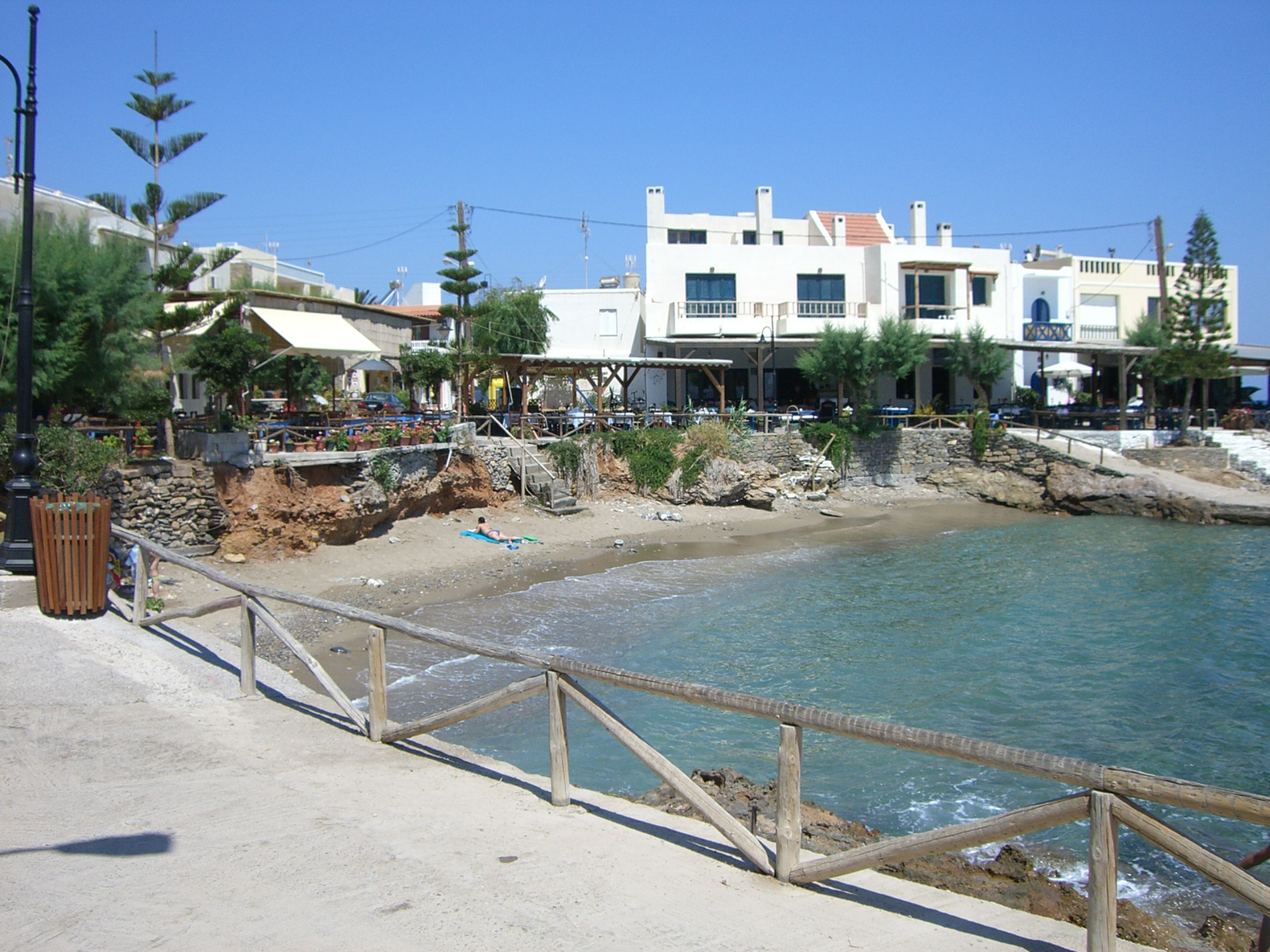
View to the Tavernas
