= Manousos =

Manousos (Greek: Μανούσος) is both a Greek masculine given name and a surname. It is a direct loanword from the Venetian Manuzio (Latin Manutius). Common in Venetian Crete, it was eventually associated with Manos and Manolis.

Notable people with the name include:

- Manoússos Theotokópoulos (1531–1604), a wealthy merchant and brother of El Greco
- Savvas Manousos (born 1985), Greek basketball player
- Giorgos Manousos (born 1987), Greek footballer
- Manousos Manousakis (1950–2024), Greek film director, producer, screenwriter and actor
- Manousos Oviedo, a main character in the 2025 American television series Pluribus
