= List of cities by average temperature =

This is a list of cities by average temperature (monthly and yearly). The temperatures listed are averages of the daily highs and lows. Thus, the actual daytime temperature in a given month may be considerably higher than the temperature listed here, depending on how large the difference between daily highs and lows is.

== Africa ==
Average temperatures for selected cities in Africa °C (°F)
Country	City	Jan	Feb	Mar	Apr	May	Jun	Jul	Aug	Sep	Oct	Nov	Dec	Year	Ref.
Algeria	Algiers	11.2 (52.2)	11.5 (52.7)	13.6 (56.5)	15.6 (60.1)	18.8 (65.8)	22.6 (72.7)	25.7 (78.3)	26.6 (79.9)	23.9 (75.0)	20.4 (68.7)	15.7 (60.3)	12.6 (54.7)	18.2 (64.8)	
Algeria	Tamanrasset	12.8 (55.0)	15.0 (59.0)	18.1 (64.6)	22.2 (72.0)	26.1 (79.0)	28.9 (84.0)	28.7 (83.7)	28.2 (82.8)	26.5 (79.7)	22.4 (72.3)	17.3 (63.1)	13.9 (57.0)	21.7 (71.1)	
Algeria	Reggane	16.0 (60.8)	18.2 (64.8)	23.1 (73.6)	27.9 (82.2)	32.2 (90.0)	36.4 (97.5)	39.8 (103.6)	38.4 (101.1)	35.5 (95.9)	29.2 (84.6)	22.0 (71.6)	17.8 (64.0)	28.3 (82.9)	
Angola	Luanda	26.7 (80.1)	28.5 (83.3)	28.6 (83.5)	28.2 (82.8)	27.0 (80.6)	23.9 (75.0)	22.1 (71.8)	22.1 (71.8)	23.5 (74.3)	25.2 (77.4)	26.7 (80.1)	26.9 (80.4)	25.8 (78.4)	
Benin	Cotonou	27.3 (81.1)	28.5 (83.3)	28.9 (84.0)	28.6 (83.5)	27.8 (82.0)	26.5 (79.7)	25.8 (78.4)	25.6 (78.1)	26.0 (78.8)	26.7 (80.1)	27.6 (81.7)	27.3 (81.1)	27.2 (81.0)	
Benin	Parakou	26.5 (79.7)	28.7 (83.7)	29.6 (85.3)	29.0 (84.2)	27.5 (81.5)	26.1 (79.0)	25.1 (77.2)	24.7 (76.5)	25.0 (77.0)	26.1 (79.0)	26.6 (79.9)	26.1 (79.0)	26.8 (80.2)	
Benin	Kandi	24.9 (76.8)	27.8 (82.0)	30.9 (87.6)	32.1 (89.8)	30.4 (86.7)	28.1 (82.6)	26.4 (79.5)	26.0 (78.8)	26.2 (79.2)	27.8 (82.0)	26.5 (79.7)	24.8 (76.6)	27.7 (81.9)	
Botswana	Maun	25.4 (77.7)	25.1 (77.2)	24.2 (75.6)	22.6 (72.7)	18.7 (65.7)	15.7 (60.3)	15.8 (60.4)	18.8 (65.8)	23.1 (73.6)	26.6 (79.9)	26.4 (79.5)	25.8 (78.4)	22.4 (72.3)	
Botswana	Gaborone	25.7 (78.3)	25.2 (77.4)	23.8 (74.8)	20.6 (69.1)	16.8 (62.2)	13.7 (56.7)	13.5 (56.3)	16.9 (62.4)	21.2 (70.2)	24.0 (75.2)	24.7 (76.5)	25.3 (77.5)	20.9 (69.6)	
Botswana	Ghanzi	25.9 (78.6)	25.3 (77.5)	24.1 (75.4)	21.2 (70.2)	17.6 (63.7)	14.3 (57.7)	14.1 (57.4)	17.1 (62.8)	21.5 (70.7)	24.6 (76.3)	25.7 (78.3)	26.1 (79.0)	21.4 (70.5)	
Burkina Faso	Ouagadougou	24.8 (76.6)	27.7 (81.9)	30.9 (87.6)	32.6 (90.7)	31.6 (88.9)	29.2 (84.6)	27.3 (81.1)	26.4 (79.5)	27.0 (80.6)	28.9 (84.0)	27.7 (81.9)	25.1 (77.2)	28.3 (82.9)	
Burkina Faso	Ouahigouya	24.2 (75.6)	27.1 (80.8)	30.4 (86.7)	33.0 (91.4)	33.2 (91.8)	30.8 (87.4)	27.9 (82.2)	27.2 (81.0)	27.8 (82.0)	29.6 (85.3)	27.4 (81.3)	24.6 (76.3)	28.6 (83.5)	
Burundi	Bujumbura	23.8 (74.8)	23.8 (74.8)	23.7 (74.7)	23.9 (75.0)	23.9 (75.0)	23.3 (73.9)	22.9 (73.2)	24.0 (75.2)	24.7 (76.5)	24.6 (76.3)	23.4 (74.1)	23.6 (74.5)	23.8 (74.8)	
Cameroon	Garoua	26.0 (78.8)	28.9 (84.0)	32.2 (90.0)	33.0 (91.4)	30.7 (87.3)	28.2 (82.8)	26.6 (79.9)	26.4 (79.5)	26.7 (80.1)	28.1 (82.6)	27.3 (81.1)	26.0 (78.8)	28.3 (82.9)	
Cameroon	Ngaoundéré	20.5 (68.9)	22.2 (72.0)	24.1 (75.4)	24.1 (75.4)	23.1 (73.6)	22.1 (71.8)	21.5 (70.7)	22.5 (72.5)	21.7 (71.1)	22.1 (71.8)	20.9 (69.6)	20.4 (68.7)	22.0 (71.6)	
Cameroon	Douala	27.5 (81.5)	28.1 (82.6)	27.8 (82.0)	27.6 (81.7)	27.2 (81.0)	26.2 (79.2)	25.1 (77.2)	24.9 (76.8)	25.6 (78.1)	26.1 (79.0)	26.9 (80.4)	27.2 (81.0)	26.7 (80.1)	
Cameroon	Yaoundé	23.7 (74.7)	25.3 (77.5)	25.0 (77.0)	24.6 (76.3)	24.1 (75.4)	23.4 (74.1)	22.6 (72.7)	23.0 (73.4)	23.1 (73.6)	23.3 (73.9)	23.7 (74.7)	23.7 (74.7)	23.8 (74.8)	
Cape Verde	Praia	22.4 (72.3)	22.2 (72.0)	22.9 (73.2)	23.4 (74.1)	24.0 (75.2)	24.9 (76.8)	25.4 (77.7)	26.2 (79.2)	26.8 (80.2)	26.4 (79.5)	25.4 (77.7)	23.4 (74.1)	24.4 (75.9)	
Central African Republic	Bangui	26.0 (78.8)	27.1 (80.8)	27.4 (81.3)	27.1 (80.8)	26.5 (79.7)	25.3 (77.5)	25.1 (77.2)	25.1 (77.2)	25.4 (77.7)	25.5 (77.9)	25.7 (78.3)	25.7 (78.3)	26.0 (78.8)	
Central African Republic	Birao	23.6 (74.5)	26.7 (80.1)	29.0 (84.2)	29.6 (85.3)	30.0 (86.0)	28.0 (82.4)	25.9 (78.6)	25.4 (77.7)	26.2 (79.2)	26.6 (79.9)	24.5 (76.1)	22.2 (72.0)	26.5 (79.7)	
Chad	N'Djamena	23.3 (73.9)	26.9 (80.4)	30.4 (86.7)	33.8 (92.8)	33.5 (92.3)	31.0 (87.8)	28.2 (82.8)	26.5 (79.7)	27.8 (82.0)	29.2 (84.6)	27.3 (81.1)	24.0 (75.2)	28.3 (82.9)	
Chad	Abéché	26.8 (80.2)	28.1 (82.6)	31.2 (88.2)	33.3 (91.9)	33.2 (91.8)	32.2 (90.0)	28.7 (83.7)	27.0 (80.6)	28.4 (83.1)	30.0 (86.0)	28.5 (83.3)	25.9 (78.6)	29.4 (84.9)	
Democratic Republic of the Congo	Kinshasa	26.0 (78.8)	26.2 (79.2)	26.7 (80.1)	26.8 (80.2)	26.0 (78.8)	23.7 (74.7)	22.2 (72.0)	23.5 (74.3)	25.3 (77.5)	26.0 (78.8)	25.9 (78.6)	25.6 (78.1)	25.3 (77.5)	
Democratic Republic of the Congo	Lubumbashi	21.8 (71.2)	21.6 (70.9)	21.8 (71.2)	21.4 (70.5)	19.2 (66.6)	17.0 (62.6)	16.8 (62.2)	19.1 (66.4)	22.2 (72.0)	23.8 (74.8)	22.8 (73.0)	21.8 (71.2)	20.8 (69.4)	
Djibouti	Djibouti	25.1 (77.2)	25.7 (78.3)	27.0 (80.6)	28.7 (83.7)	31.0 (87.8)	34.2 (93.6)	36.4 (97.5)	36.0 (96.8)	33.1 (91.6)	29.3 (84.7)	26.9 (80.4)	25.4 (77.7)	29.9 (85.8)	
Egypt	Cairo	13.6 (56.5)	14.9 (58.8)	16.9 (62.4)	21.2 (70.2)	24.5 (76.1)	27.3 (81.1)	27.6 (81.7)	27.4 (81.3)	26 (79)	23.3 (73.9)	18.9 (66.0)	15 (59)	21.4 (70.5)	
Egypt	Alexandria	13.4 (56.1)	13.9 (57.0)	15.7 (60.3)	18.5 (65.3)	21.2 (70.2)	24.3 (75.7)	25.9 (78.6)	26.3 (79.3)	25.1 (77.2)	22.0 (71.6)	18.7 (65.7)	14.9 (58.8)	20.0 (68.0)	
Equatorial Guinea	Bata	25.6 (78.1)	25.8 (78.4)	25.7 (78.3)	25.6 (78.1)	25.6 (78.1)	25.0 (77.0)	24.1 (75.4)	24.2 (75.6)	24.6 (76.3)	24.8 (76.6)	25.2 (77.4)	25.0 (77.0)	25.1 (77.2)	
Equatorial Guinea	Malabo	26.9 (80.4)	27.7 (81.9)	27.6 (81.7)	27.2 (81.0)	26.7 (80.1)	25.9 (78.6)	25.3 (77.5)	25.0 (77.0)	25.1 (77.2)	25.5 (77.9)	26.1 (79.0)	26.6 (79.9)	26.3 (79.3)	
Eritrea	Asmara	13.8 (56.8)	14.9 (58.8)	16.3 (61.3)	17.0 (62.6)	17.6 (63.7)	17.6 (63.7)	16.3 (61.3)	16.1 (61.0)	15.7 (60.3)	14.9 (58.8)	14.0 (57.2)	13.2 (55.8)	15.6 (60.1)	
Eritrea	Assab	26.3 (79.3)	26.7 (80.1)	28.5 (83.3)	30.5 (86.9)	32.0 (89.6)	33.1 (91.6)	35.0 (95.0)	34.6 (94.3)	32.9 (91.2)	31.2 (88.2)	28.8 (83.8)	26.9 (80.4)	30.5 (86.9)	
Ethiopia	Mek'ele	19.5 (67.1)	20.5 (68.9)	21.5 (70.7)	22.5 (72.5)	23.5 (74.3)	23.5 (74.3)	20.5 (68.9)	20 (68)	21.5 (70.7)	20.5 (68.9)	19.5 (67.1)	18.5 (65.3)	22.7 (72.9)	
Ethiopia	Addis Ababa	16.0 (60.8)	16.8 (62.2)	17.8 (64.0)	17.8 (64.0)	18.2 (64.8)	16.8 (62.2)	15.5 (59.9)	15.6 (60.1)	16.1 (61.0)	16.1 (61.0)	15.4 (59.7)	15.2 (59.4)	16.4 (61.5)	
Gabon	Libreville	26.8 (80.2)	27.0 (80.6)	27.1 (80.8)	26.6 (79.9)	26.7 (80.1)	25.4 (77.7)	24.3 (75.7)	24.3 (75.7)	25.4 (77.7)	25.7 (78.3)	25.9 (78.6)	26.2 (79.2)	25.9 (78.6)	
Gabon	Port-Gentil	26.9 (80.4)	27.3 (81.1)	27.3 (81.1)	27.1 (80.8)	26.6 (79.9)	24.4 (75.9)	23.5 (74.3)	24.7 (76.5)	25.4 (77.7)	25.9 (78.6)	26.1 (79.0)	26.5 (79.7)	26.0 (78.8)	
The Gambia	Banjul	25.3 (77.5)	25.9 (78.6)	26.3 (79.3)	26.1 (79.0)	26.5 (79.7)	27.5 (81.5)	27.7 (81.9)	27.7 (81.9)	27.9 (82.2)	28.9 (84.0)	28.4 (83.1)	26.6 (79.9)	27.1 (80.8)	
Ghana	Accra	27.3 (81.1)	27.7 (81.9)	27.7 (81.9)	27.7 (81.9)	27.2 (81.0)	25.6 (78.1)	24.4 (75.9)	24.3 (75.7)	25.2 (77.4)	26.0 (78.8)	27.0 (80.6)	27.2 (81.0)	26.4 (79.5)	
Ghana	Tamale	27.9 (82.2)	30.1 (86.2)	30.9 (87.6)	29.8 (85.6)	28.6 (83.5)	26.8 (80.2)	26.0 (78.8)	25.8 (78.4)	25.9 (78.6)	27.3 (81.1)	28.2 (82.8)	27.5 (81.5)	27.9 (82.2)	
Ghana	Kumasi	27.4 (81.3)	28.8 (83.8)	28.5 (83.3)	28.0 (82.4)	27.5 (81.5)	26.3 (79.3)	25.3 (77.5)	24.9 (76.8)	25.8 (78.4)	26.6 (79.9)	27.4 (81.3)	27.3 (81.1)	27.0 (80.6)	
Guinea	Conakry	26.1 (79.0)	26.5 (79.7)	27.0 (80.6)	27.4 (81.3)	27.5 (81.5)	26.5 (79.7)	25.5 (77.9)	25.2 (77.4)	25.6 (78.1)	26.3 (79.3)	27.0 (80.6)	26.6 (79.9)	26.4 (79.5)	
Guinea	Kankan	24.3 (75.7)	26.3 (79.3)	29.6 (85.3)	30.1 (86.2)	28.3 (82.9)	26.4 (79.5)	25.3 (77.5)	25.1 (77.2)	25.5 (77.9)	26.4 (79.5)	27.0 (80.6)	23.8 (74.8)	26.5 (79.7)	
Guinea-Bissau	Bissau	24.4 (75.9)	25.6 (78.1)	26.6 (79.9)	27.0 (80.6)	27.5 (81.5)	26.9 (80.4)	26.1 (79.0)	26.4 (79.5)	26.4 (79.5)	27.0 (80.6)	26.9 (80.4)	24.8 (76.6)	26.3 (79.3)	
Ivory Coast	Gagnoa	26.1 (79.0)	26.8 (80.2)	27.5 (81.5)	27.3 (81.1)	26.8 (80.2)	25.7 (78.3)	24.9 (76.8)	24.7 (76.5)	25.5 (77.9)	26.2 (79.2)	26.5 (79.7)	25.7 (78.3)	26.1 (79.0)	
Ivory Coast	Bouaké	26.6 (79.9)	27.8 (82.0)	27.8 (82.0)	27.0 (80.6)	26.1 (79.0)	25.0 (77.0)	24.1 (75.4)	23.8 (74.8)	24.3 (75.7)	25.0 (77.0)	25.7 (78.3)	25.7 (78.3)	25.7 (78.3)	
Ivory Coast	Abidjan	26.8 (80.2)	27.7 (81.9)	27.9 (82.2)	27.7 (81.9)	26.9 (80.4)	25.8 (78.4)	24.7 (76.5)	24.5 (76.1)	25.6 (78.1)	26.8 (80.2)	27.4 (81.3)	27.0 (80.6)	26.6 (79.9)	
Ivory Coast	Odienné	24.0 (75.2)	27.1 (80.8)	28.5 (83.3)	28.4 (83.1)	27.3 (81.1)	25.8 (78.4)	24.8 (76.6)	24.5 (76.1)	24.7 (76.5)	25.3 (77.5)	25.1 (77.2)	23.3 (73.9)	25.7 (78.3)	
Kenya	Mombasa	27.6 (81.7)	28.1 (82.6)	28.3 (82.9)	27.6 (81.7)	26.2 (79.2)	24.8 (76.6)	24.0 (75.2)	24.0 (75.2)	24.7 (76.5)	25.7 (78.3)	26.9 (80.4)	27.4 (81.3)	26.3 (79.3)	
Kenya	Nairobi	18.0 (64.4)	18.8 (65.8)	19.4 (66.9)	19.2 (66.6)	17.8 (64.0)	16.3 (61.3)	15.6 (60.1)	15.9 (60.6)	17.3 (63.1)	18.5 (65.3)	18.4 (65.1)	18.1 (64.6)	17.8 (64.0)	
Kenya	Garissa	29.7 (85.5)	30.6 (87.1)	31.4 (88.5)	30.7 (87.3)	29.6 (85.3)	27.9 (82.2)	27.4 (81.3)	27.6 (81.7)	28.4 (83.1)	29.7 (85.5)	29.9 (85.8)	29.2 (84.6)	29.3 (84.7)	
Kenya	Lodwar	28.7 (83.7)	29.6 (85.3)	30.1 (86.2)	29.6 (85.3)	29.7 (85.5)	29.1 (84.4)	28.4 (83.1)	28.7 (83.7)	29.6 (85.3)	30.1 (86.2)	29.1 (84.4)	28.5 (83.3)	29.3 (84.7)	
Libya	Tripoli	12.7 (54.9)	13.9 (57.0)	15.3 (59.5)	18.7 (65.7)	21.9 (71.4)	25.3 (77.5)	26.7 (80.1)	27.7 (81.9)	26.2 (79.2)	21.5 (70.7)	16.8 (62.2)	13.9 (57.0)	20.1 (68.2)	
Libya	Benghazi	12.5 (54.5)	13.2 (55.8)	14.9 (58.8)	18.7 (65.7)	22.5 (72.5)	25.5 (77.9)	25.9 (78.6)	26.5 (79.7)	25.1 (77.2)	22.1 (71.8)	18.2 (64.8)	14.1 (57.4)	19.9 (67.8)	
Madagascar	Fianarantsoa	20.8 (69.4)	20.8 (69.4)	20.0 (68.0)	18.9 (66.0)	16.7 (62.1)	14.5 (58.1)	14.0 (57.2)	14.4 (57.9)	16.2 (61.2)	18.3 (64.9)	19.7 (67.5)	20.4 (68.7)	17.9 (64.2)	
Madagascar	Toamasina	26.0 (78.8)	26.1 (79.0)	25.5 (77.9)	24.6 (76.3)	22.9 (73.2)	21.1 (70.0)	20.4 (68.7)	20.5 (68.9)	21.3 (70.3)	22.7 (72.9)	24.3 (75.7)	25.5 (77.9)	23.4 (74.1)	
Madagascar	Antananarivo	20.5 (68.9)	20.7 (69.3)	20.1 (68.2)	19.2 (66.6)	16.8 (62.2)	14.6 (58.3)	14.1 (57.4)	14.5 (58.1)	16.3 (61.3)	18.5 (65.3)	19.7 (67.5)	20.2 (68.4)	17.9 (64.2)	
Madagascar	Antsiranana	26.0 (78.8)	26.0 (78.8)	26.2 (79.2)	26.3 (79.3)	25.4 (77.7)	24.1 (75.4)	23.5 (74.3)	23.4 (74.1)	24.1 (75.4)	25.2 (77.4)	26.3 (79.3)	26.5 (79.7)	25.2 (77.4)	
Madagascar	Mahajanga	27.1 (80.8)	27.2 (81.0)	27.5 (81.5)	27.4 (81.3)	26.1 (79.0)	24.6 (76.3)	24.2 (75.6)	24.6 (76.3)	25.4 (77.7)	26.8 (80.2)	27.7 (81.9)	27.4 (81.3)	26.3 (79.3)	
Madagascar	Toliara	27.5 (81.5)	27.5 (81.5)	26.8 (80.2)	25.0 (77.0)	22.7 (72.9)	20.7 (69.3)	20.3 (68.5)	21.0 (69.8)	22.3 (72.1)	23.9 (75.0)	25.3 (77.5)	26.6 (79.9)	24.1 (75.4)	
Malawi	Karonga	24.9 (76.8)	25.0 (77.0)	24.7 (76.5)	24.6 (76.3)	23.6 (74.5)	22.2 (72.0)	21.7 (71.1)	22.4 (72.3)	24.3 (75.7)	26.4 (79.5)	27.0 (80.6)	25.7 (78.3)	24.4 (75.9)	
Malawi	Blantyre	23.5 (74.3)	23.4 (74.1)	23.2 (73.8)	22.2 (72.0)	20.3 (68.5)	18.5 (65.3)	18.4 (65.1)	20.0 (68.0)	23.1 (73.6)	25.0 (77.0)	25.0 (77.0)	24.0 (75.2)	22.2 (72.0)	
Malawi	Mzuzu	19.9 (67.8)	20.0 (68.0)	19.5 (67.1)	18.7 (65.7)	16.4 (61.5)	13.9 (57.0)	13.1 (55.6)	14.0 (57.2)	16.7 (62.1)	19.4 (66.9)	20.5 (68.9)	20.1 (68.2)	17.7 (63.9)	
Mali	Ségou	25.3 (77.5)	28.2 (82.8)	31.5 (88.7)	34.0 (93.2)	34.1 (93.4)	31.9 (89.4)	28.9 (84.0)	27.6 (81.7)	28.4 (83.1)	30.1 (86.2)	29.0 (84.2)	26.2 (79.2)	29.6 (85.3)	
Mali	Timbuktu	21.5 (70.7)	24.2 (75.6)	27.6 (81.7)	31.3 (88.3)	34.1 (93.4)	34.5 (94.1)	32.2 (90.0)	30.7 (87.3)	31.6 (88.9)	30.9 (87.6)	26.5 (79.7)	22.0 (71.6)	28.9 (84.0)	
Mali	Bamako	25.1 (77.2)	27.8 (82.0)	30.2 (86.4)	31.6 (88.9)	31.4 (88.5)	29.1 (84.4)	26.8 (80.2)	26.1 (79.0)	26.6 (79.9)	27.7 (81.9)	26.5 (79.7)	24.8 (76.6)	27.8 (82.0)	
Mauritania	Nouadhibou	18.3 (64.9)	19.2 (66.6)	20.1 (68.2)	19.9 (67.8)	20.4 (68.7)	22.8 (73.0)	22.4 (72.3)	23.5 (74.3)	24.6 (76.3)	23.3 (73.9)	21.2 (70.2)	19.2 (66.6)	21.3 (70.3)	
Mauritania	Nouakchott	21.5 (70.7)	23.0 (73.4)	24.2 (75.6)	24.3 (75.7)	25.8 (78.4)	26.7 (80.1)	27.3 (81.1)	28.4 (83.1)	29.6 (85.3)	28.8 (83.8)	25.8 (78.4)	22.8 (73.0)	25.7 (78.3)	
Morocco	Ifrane	4.2 (39.6)	5.2 (41.4)	6.6 (43.9)	8.0 (46.4)	11.8 (53.2)	15.9 (60.6)	21.2 (70.2)	21.4 (70.5)	17.9 (64.2)	12.5 (54.5)	7.8 (46.0)	4.7 (40.5)	11.4 (52.5)	
Morocco	Rabat	12.6 (54.7)	13.1 (55.6)	14.2 (57.6)	15.2 (59.4)	17.4 (63.3)	19.8 (67.6)	22.2 (72.0)	22.4 (72.3)	21.5 (70.7)	19.0 (66.2)	15.9 (60.6)	13.2 (55.8)	17.2 (63.0)	
Morocco	Marrakesh	12.2 (54.0)	13.8 (56.8)	15.8 (60.4)	17.3 (63.1)	20.6 (69.1)	23.8 (74.8)	28.3 (82.9)	28.3 (82.9)	25.3 (77.5)	21.1 (70.0)	16.3 (61.3)	12.6 (54.7)	19.6 (67.3)	
Morocco	Ouarzazate	9.3 (48.7)	11.9 (53.4)	14.8 (58.6)	17.6 (63.7)	21.7 (71.1)	25.9 (78.6)	29.5 (85.1)	28.8 (83.8)	24.6 (76.3)	19.4 (66.9)	13.7 (56.7)	9.5 (49.1)	18.9 (66.0)	
Mozambique	Maputo	26.3 (79.3)	26.2 (79.2)	25.6 (78.1)	23.5 (74.3)	21.4 (70.5)	18.9 (66.0)	18.8 (65.8)	20.0 (68.0)	21.5 (70.7)	22.4 (72.3)	23.8 (74.8)	25.5 (77.9)	22.8 (73.0)	
Niger	Niamey	24.3 (75.7)	27.3 (81.1)	30.9 (87.6)	33.8 (92.8)	34.0 (93.2)	31.5 (88.7)	29.0 (84.2)	27.9 (82.2)	29.0 (84.2)	30.8 (87.4)	27.9 (82.2)	25.0 (77.0)	29.3 (84.7)	
Nigeria	Lagos	27.3 (81.1)	28.5 (83.3)	28.5 (83.3)	28 (82)	27.1 (80.8)	25.6 (78.1)	25.3 (77.5)	25.1 (77.2)	25.5 (77.9)	26.4 (79.5)	27.2 (81.0)	27.2 (81.0)	26.8 (80.2)	
Nigeria	Makurdi	26.9 (80.4)	27.3 (81.1)	27.3 (81.1)	27.1 (80.8)	26.6 (79.9)	24.4 (75.9)	23.5 (74.3)	24.7 (76.5)	25.4 (77.7)	25.9 (78.6)	26.1 (79.0)	26.5 (79.7)	26.0 (78.8)	
Nigeria	Jos	21.3 (70.3)	22.9 (73.2)	24.9 (76.8)	25.7 (78.3)	24.5 (76.1)	22.7 (72.9)	21.4 (70.5)	20.9 (69.6)	21.9 (71.4)	22.9 (73.2)	22.7 (72.9)	21.5 (70.7)	22.8 (73.0)	
Nigeria	Kano	21.2 (70.2)	24.4 (75.9)	28.7 (83.7)	31.3 (88.3)	30.9 (87.6)	28.2 (82.8)	26.2 (79.2)	25.5 (77.9)	26.6 (79.9)	27.3 (81.1)	24.6 (76.3)	21.6 (70.9)	26.4 (79.5)	
Nigeria	Sokoto	24.5 (76.1)	27.1 (80.8)	31.2 (88.2)	33.7 (92.7)	33.1 (91.6)	30.9 (87.6)	28.2 (82.8)	27.2 (81.0)	28.0 (82.4)	29.7 (85.5)	28.3 (82.9)	25.3 (77.5)	28.9 (84.0)	
Republic of the Congo	Brazzaville	26.0 (78.8)	26.4 (79.5)	26.7 (80.1)	26.8 (80.2)	26.2 (79.2)	23.8 (74.8)	22.4 (72.3)	23.6 (74.5)	25.5 (77.9)	26.1 (79.0)	25.9 (78.6)	25.8 (78.4)	25.4 (77.7)	
Republic of the Congo	Pointe-Noire	27.5 (81.5)	27.6 (81.7)	27.9 (82.2)	27.8 (82.0)	26.8 (80.2)	24.5 (76.1)	23.1 (73.6)	23.3 (73.9)	24.5 (76.1)	26.3 (79.3)	26.7 (80.1)	26.9 (80.4)	26.1 (79.0)	
Republic of the Congo	Dolisie	25.8 (78.4)	26.1 (79.0)	26.4 (79.5)	26.3 (79.3)	25.7 (78.3)	23.7 (74.7)	22.7 (72.9)	22.7 (72.9)	24.0 (75.2)	25.4 (77.7)	25.7 (78.3)	25.4 (77.7)	25.0 (77.0)	
Senegal	Dakar	22.3 (72.1)	21.6 (70.9)	21.8 (71.2)	22.1 (71.8)	23.5 (74.3)	26.2 (79.2)	27.7 (81.9)	28.0 (82.4)	28.1 (82.6)	28.4 (83.1)	26.8 (80.2)	24.5 (76.1)	25.1 (77.2)	
Senegal	Thiès	21 (70)	21 (70)	21 (70)	22 (72)	24 (75)	26 (79)	27 (81)	27 (81)	27 (81)	27 (81)	26 (79)	23 (73)	24 (75)	
Somalia	Bosaso	25.0 (77.0)	25.0 (77.0)	26.7 (80.1)	28.8 (83.8)	31.1 (88.0)	35.6 (96.1)	35.6 (96.1)	36.1 (97.0)	33.3 (91.9)	27.8 (82.0)	25.6 (78.1)	25.6 (78.1)	30.0 (86.0)	
Somalia	Hargeisa	17.7 (63.9)	18.7 (65.7)	21.6 (70.9)	23.0 (73.4)	24.1 (75.4)	24.3 (75.7)	23.6 (74.5)	23.6 (74.5)	23.6 (74.5)	24.1 (75.4)	18.7 (65.7)	18.0 (64.4)	21.7 (71.1)	
Somalia	Mogadishu	26.6 (79.9)	26.9 (80.4)	28.0 (82.4)	28.9 (84.0)	28.2 (82.8)	26.7 (80.1)	25.4 (77.7)	25.9 (78.6)	26.5 (79.7)	27.3 (81.1)	27.5 (81.5)	26.9 (80.4)	27.1 (80.8)	
South Africa	Pretoria	22.6 (72.7)	22.1 (71.8)	21.0 (69.8)	17.9 (64.2)	14.7 (58.5)	11.5 (52.7)	11.9 (53.4)	14.7 (58.5)	18.6 (65.5)	20.1 (68.2)	21.0 (69.8)	21.9 (71.4)	18.2 (64.8)	
South Africa	Cape Town	20.4 (68.7)	20.4 (68.7)	19.2 (66.6)	16.9 (62.4)	14.4 (57.9)	12.5 (54.5)	11.9 (53.4)	12.4 (54.3)	13.7 (56.7)	15.6 (60.1)	17.9 (64.2)	19.5 (67.1)	16.2 (61.2)	
South Africa	Johannesburg	19.5 (67.1)	19.0 (66.2)	18.0 (64.4)	15.3 (59.5)	12.6 (54.7)	9.6 (49.3)	10.0 (50.0)	12.5 (54.5)	15.9 (60.6)	17.1 (62.8)	17.9 (64.2)	19.0 (66.2)	15.5 (59.9)	
South Africa	Bloemfontein	22.8 (73.0)	21.4 (70.5)	19.2 (66.6)	14.9 (58.8)	10.7 (51.3)	6.9 (44.4)	7.2 (45.0)	10.1 (50.2)	14.6 (58.3)	17.5 (63.5)	19.9 (67.8)	21.9 (71.4)	15.6 (60.1)	
South Africa	Upington	27.8 (82.0)	26.9 (80.4)	24.7 (76.5)	20.2 (68.4)	15.7 (60.3)	12.1 (53.8)	11.9 (53.4)	14.0 (57.2)	18.1 (64.6)	21.4 (70.5)	24.7 (76.5)	26.9 (80.4)	20.4 (68.7)	
South Africa	Durban	24.1 (75.4)	24.3 (75.7)	23.7 (74.7)	21.6 (70.9)	19.1 (66.4)	16.6 (61.9)	16.5 (61.7)	17.7 (63.9)	19.2 (66.6)	20.1 (68.2)	21.4 (70.5)	23.1 (73.6)	20.6 (69.1)	
South Sudan	Juba	28.3 (82.9)	29.5 (85.1)	29.9 (85.8)	29.2 (84.6)	27.9 (82.2)	26.9 (80.4)	25.9 (78.6)	26.1 (79.0)	26.8 (80.2)	27.5 (81.5)	27.6 (81.7)	27.7 (81.9)	27.8 (82.0)	
South Sudan	Wau	26.8 (80.2)	28.5 (83.3)	30.4 (86.7)	30.6 (87.1)	29.3 (84.7)	27.5 (81.5)	26.3 (79.3)	26.2 (79.2)	26.8 (80.2)	27.4 (81.3)	27.4 (81.3)	26.5 (79.7)	27.8 (82.0)	
Spain	Las Palmas	18.1 (64.6)	18.4 (65.1)	19.3 (66.7)	19.5 (67.1)	20.5 (68.9)	22.2 (72.0)	23.8 (74.8)	24.6 (76.3)	24.3 (75.7)	23.1 (73.6)	21.2 (70.2)	19.3 (66.7)	21.2 (70.2)	
Sudan	Port Sudan	23.3 (73.9)	23.0 (73.4)	24.3 (75.7)	26.5 (79.7)	29.3 (84.7)	32.2 (90.0)	34.1 (93.4)	34.5 (94.1)	32.1 (89.8)	29.3 (84.7)	27.3 (81.1)	24.7 (76.5)	28.4 (83.1)	
Sudan	Khartoum	23.2 (73.8)	25.0 (77.0)	28.7 (83.7)	31.9 (89.4)	34.5 (94.1)	34.3 (93.7)	32.1 (89.8)	31.5 (88.7)	32.5 (90.5)	32.4 (90.3)	28.1 (82.6)	24.5 (76.1)	29.9 (85.8)	
Tanzania	Dar es Salaam	27.4 (81.3)	27.7 (81.9)	27.4 (81.3)	26.5 (79.7)	25.5 (77.9)	24.2 (75.6)	23.5 (74.3)	23.7 (74.7)	24.3 (75.7)	25.3 (77.5)	26.3 (79.3)	27.3 (81.1)	25.8 (78.4)	
Tanzania	Zanzibar City	28.5 (83.3)	28.5 (83.3)	28.4 (83.1)	27.4 (81.3)	26.6 (79.9)	25.9 (78.6)	25.3 (77.5)	25.2 (77.4)	25.7 (78.3)	26.5 (79.7)	27.1 (80.8)	28.0 (82.4)	26.9 (80.4)	
Tanzania	Tabora	23.6 (74.5)	23.7 (74.7)	23.8 (74.8)	23.5 (74.3)	23.1 (73.6)	22.2 (72.0)	22.2 (72.0)	23.7 (74.7)	25.3 (77.5)	26.0 (78.8)	25.1 (77.2)	23.9 (75.0)	23.9 (75.0)	
Tanzania	Dodoma	23.8 (74.8)	23.0 (73.4)	23.5 (74.3)	22.8 (73.0)	22.1 (71.8)	21.4 (70.5)	19.8 (67.6)	20.5 (68.9)	22.3 (72.1)	23.8 (74.8)	25.1 (77.2)	24.6 (76.3)	22.7 (72.9)	
Togo	Lomé	27.1 (80.8)	28.2 (82.8)	28.5 (83.3)	28.2 (82.8)	27.4 (81.3)	26.2 (79.2)	25.3 (77.5)	25.2 (77.4)	25.8 (78.4)	26.6 (79.9)	27.3 (81.1)	27.1 (80.8)	26.9 (80.4)	
Togo	Mango	26.8 (80.2)	29.4 (84.9)	31.5 (88.7)	31.4 (88.5)	29.6 (85.3)	27.5 (81.5)	26.4 (79.5)	26.0 (78.8)	26.4 (79.5)	27.9 (82.2)	27.9 (82.2)	26.7 (80.1)	28.1 (82.6)	
Tunisia	Tunis	11.5 (52.7)	12.0 (53.6)	13.2 (55.8)	15.6 (60.1)	19.3 (66.7)	23.2 (73.8)	26.3 (79.3)	26.8 (80.2)	24.4 (75.9)	20.4 (68.7)	15.9 (60.6)	12.5 (54.5)	18.4 (65.1)	
Tunisia	Gabès	12.0 (53.6)	13.3 (55.9)	15.1 (59.2)	17.7 (63.9)	20.8 (69.4)	24.0 (75.2)	26.6 (79.9)	27.4 (81.3)	25.6 (78.1)	21.7 (71.1)	16.8 (62.2)	13.0 (55.4)	19.5 (67.1)	
Uganda	Kampala	23.2 (73.8)	23.7 (74.7)	23.4 (74.1)	22.9 (73.2)	22.6 (72.7)	22.4 (72.3)	22.0 (71.6)	22.2 (72.0)	22.6 (72.7)	22.6 (72.7)	22.5 (72.5)	22.7 (72.9)	22.7 (72.9)	
Uganda	Entebbe	22.2 (72.0)	22.8 (73.0)	22.6 (72.7)	22.2 (72.0)	21.7 (71.1)	21.5 (70.7)	21.3 (70.3)	21.7 (71.1)	22.0 (71.6)	22.1 (71.8)	22.0 (71.6)	22.2 (72.0)	22.0 (71.6)	
Zambia	Ndola	20.8 (69.4)	20.8 (69.4)	21.0 (69.8)	20.5 (68.9)	18.6 (65.5)	16.5 (61.7)	16.7 (62.1)	19.2 (66.6)	22.5 (72.5)	23.7 (74.7)	22.5 (72.5)	21.0 (69.8)	20.3 (68.5)	
Zambia	Lusaka	21.5 (70.7)	21.5 (70.7)	21.1 (70.0)	19.9 (67.8)	17.4 (63.3)	15.2 (59.4)	14.9 (58.8)	17.3 (63.1)	21.3 (70.3)	23.5 (74.3)	23.4 (74.1)	21.7 (71.1)	19.9 (67.8)	
Zambia	Livingstone	23.6 (74.5)	23.2 (73.8)	23.1 (73.6)	21.9 (71.4)	18.9 (66.0)	16.0 (60.8)	16.1 (61.0)	19.3 (66.7)	23.9 (75.0)	26.2 (79.2)	25.1 (77.2)	23.6 (74.5)	21.8 (71.2)	
Zimbabwe	Harare	21.0 (69.8)	20.7 (69.3)	20.3 (68.5)	18.8 (65.8)	16.1 (61.0)	13.7 (56.7)	13.4 (56.1)	15.5 (59.9)	18.6 (65.5)	20.8 (69.4)	21.2 (70.2)	20.9 (69.6)	18.4 (65.1)	
Zimbabwe	Bulawayo	21.8 (71.2)	21.2 (70.2)	20.6 (69.1)	18.7 (65.7)	16.0 (60.8)	13.7 (56.7)	13.8 (56.8)	16.4 (61.5)	19.9 (67.8)	21.6 (70.9)	21.7 (71.1)	21.4 (70.5)	18.9 (66.0)	

== Asia ==
Average temperatures for selected cities in Asia °C (°F)
Country	City	Jan	Feb	Mar	Apr	May	Jun	Jul	Aug	Sep	Oct	Nov	Dec	Year	Ref.
Afghanistan	Kabul	−2.3 (27.9)	−0.7 (30.7)	6.3 (43.3)	12.8 (55.0)	17.3 (63.1)	22.8 (73.0)	25.0 (77.0)	24.1 (75.4)	19.7 (67.5)	13.1 (55.6)	5.9 (42.6)	0.6 (33.1)	12.1 (53.8)	
Azerbaijan	Baku	4.4 (39.9)	4.2 (39.6)	7.0 (44.6)	12.9 (55.2)	18.5 (65.3)	23.5 (74.3)	26.4 (79.5)	26.3 (79.3)	22.5 (72.5)	16.6 (61.9)	11.2 (52.2)	7.3 (45.1)	15.1 (59.2)	
Armenia	Yerevan	−3.6 (25.5)	0.1 (32.2)	6.3 (43.3)	12.9 (55.2)	17.4 (63.3)	22.6 (72.7)	26.4 (79.5)	26.1 (79.0)	21.1 (70.0)	13.8 (56.8)	6.2 (43.2)	−0.2 (31.6)	12.4 (54.3)	
Bahrain	Manama	17.2 (63.0)	18.0 (64.4)	21.2 (70.2)	25.3 (77.5)	30.0 (86.0)	32.6 (90.7)	34.1 (93.4)	34.2 (93.6)	32.5 (90.5)	29.3 (84.7)	24.5 (76.1)	19.3 (66.7)	26.5 (79.7)	
Bangladesh	Dhaka	18.6 (65.5)	22.0 (71.6)	26.3 (79.3)	28.4 (83.1)	28.8 (83.8)	29.0 (84.2)	28.7 (83.7)	28.9 (84.0)	28.5 (83.3)	27.4 (81.3)	24.0 (75.2)	20.0 (68.0)	25.9 (78.6)	
Bangladesh	Rangpur	16.3 (61.3)	19.2 (66.6)	23.4 (74.1)	26.1 (79.0)	27.4 (81.3)	28.4 (83.1)	28.6 (83.5)	28.9 (84.0)	28.0 (82.4)	26.2 (79.2)	22.2 (72.0)	18.2 (64.8)	24.4 (75.9)	
Bangladesh	Chittagong	19.8 (67.6)	22.3 (72.1)	25.7 (78.3)	27.9 (82.2)	28.6 (83.5)	28.4 (83.1)	27.9 (82.2)	28.1 (82.6)	28.3 (82.9)	27.7 (81.9)	24.9 (76.8)	21.2 (70.2)	25.9 (78.6)	
Cambodia	Phnom Penh	26.6 (79.9)	28.0 (82.4)	29.4 (84.9)	30.2 (86.4)	30.0 (86.0)	29.2 (84.6)	28.7 (83.7)	28.5 (83.3)	28.2 (82.8)	27.2 (81.0)	27.1 (80.8)	26.3 (79.3)	28.3 (82.9)	
China	Beijing	−3.1 (26.4)	0.3 (32.5)	6.7 (44.1)	14.8 (58.6)	20.8 (69.4)	24.9 (76.8)	26.7 (80.1)	25.5 (77.9)	20.8 (69.4)	13.7 (56.7)	5.0 (41.0)	−0.9 (30.4)	12.9 (55.2)	
China	Changsha	5.1 (41.2)	7.8 (46.0)	11.7 (53.1)	17.9 (64.2)	22.6 (72.7)	26.2 (79.2)	29.6 (85.3)	28.4 (83.1)	24.2 (75.6)	18.9 (66.0)	13.2 (55.8)	7.5 (45.5)	17.8 (64.0)	
China	Chongqing	8.0 (46.4)	10.1 (50.2)	14.0 (57.2)	18.8 (65.8)	22.8 (73.0)	25.3 (77.5)	28.5 (83.3)	28.6 (83.5)	24.3 (75.7)	18.7 (65.7)	14.3 (57.7)	9.3 (48.7)	18.6 (65.5)	
China	Guangzhou	13.9 (57.0)	15.2 (59.4)	18.1 (64.6)	22.4 (72.3)	25.8 (78.4)	27.8 (82.0)	28.9 (84.0)	28.8 (83.8)	27.5 (81.5)	24.7 (76.5)	20.1 (68.2)	15.5 (59.9)	22.4 (72.3)	
China	Harbin	−17.6 (0.3)	−12.1 (10.2)	−2.7 (27.1)	7.7 (45.9)	15.4 (59.7)	21.4 (70.5)	23.3 (73.9)	21.8 (71.2)	15.4 (59.7)	6.8 (44.2)	−4.6 (23.7)	−14.4 (6.1)	5.0 (41.0)	
China	Kunming	9.1 (48.4)	11.4 (52.5)	14.5 (58.1)	17.7 (63.9)	19.4 (66.9)	20.5 (68.9)	20.3 (68.5)	20.0 (68.0)	18.5 (65.3)	16.0 (60.8)	12.3 (54.1)	9.2 (48.6)	15.7 (60.3)	
China	Lhasa	−2.1 (28.2)	1.1 (34.0)	4.6 (40.3)	8.1 (46.6)	11.9 (53.4)	15.5 (59.9)	15.3 (59.5)	14.5 (58.1)	12.8 (55.0)	8.1 (46.6)	2.2 (36.0)	−1.7 (28.9)	7.6 (45.7)	
China	Shanghai	4.6 (40.3)	6.1 (43.0)	9.6 (49.3)	15.1 (59.2)	20.3 (68.5)	24.1 (75.4)	28.4 (83.1)	28.1 (82.6)	24.4 (75.9)	19.3 (66.7)	13.4 (56.1)	7.1 (44.8)	16.7 (62.1)	
China	Shenzhen	15.7 (60.3)	16.8 (62.2)	19.4 (66.9)	23.1 (73.6)	26.4 (79.5)	28.3 (82.9)	29.0 (84.2)	28.8 (83.8)	27.9 (82.2)	25.5 (77.9)	21.7 (71.1)	17.4 (63.3)	23.3 (73.9)	
China	Ürümqi	−12.1 (10.2)	−9.3 (15.3)	−0.5 (31.1)	10.4 (50.7)	17 (63)	21.8 (71.2)	23.9 (75.0)	22.7 (72.9)	17 (63)	8.4 (47.1)	−1.5 (29.3)	−9.4 (15.1)	7.4 (45.3)	
China	Xi'an	0.3 (32.5)	3.6 (38.5)	8.7 (47.7)	15.4 (59.7)	20.5 (68.9)	25.3 (77.5)	27.0 (80.6)	25.1 (77.2)	20.3 (68.5)	14.1 (57.4)	7.0 (44.6)	1.5 (34.7)	14.1 (57.4)	
China	Yinchuan	−7.9 (17.8)	−3.8 (25.2)	3.2 (37.8)	11.2 (52.2)	17.3 (63.1)	21.5 (70.7)	23.5 (74.3)	21.6 (70.9)	16.3 (61.3)	9.2 (48.6)	1.4 (34.5)	−5.5 (22.1)	9.0 (48.2)	
East Timor	Dili	27.7 (81.9)	27.6 (81.7)	27.4 (81.3)	27.4 (81.3)	27.0 (80.6)	26.8 (80.2)	25.5 (77.9)	25.1 (77.2)	25.4 (77.7)	26.0 (78.8)	27.2 (81.0)	27.4 (81.3)	26.6 (79.9)	
Georgia	Batumi	6 (43)	7 (45)	8 (46)	12 (54)	16 (61)	20 (68)	22 (72)	22 (72)	20 (68)	16 (61)	12 (54)	8 (46)	14 (57)	
Georgia	Tbilisi	1.2 (34.2)	2.7 (36.9)	6.6 (43.9)	12.2 (54.0)	17.4 (63.3)	21.3 (70.3)	24.5 (76.1)	24.1 (75.4)	19.6 (67.3)	13.7 (56.7)	7.8 (46.0)	3.2 (37.8)	12.9 (55.2)	
Hong Kong	Hong Kong	16.3 (61.3)	16.8 (62.2)	19.1 (66.4)	22.6 (72.7)	25.9 (78.6)	27.9 (82.2)	28.8 (83.8)	28.6 (83.5)	27.7 (81.9)	25.5 (77.9)	21.8 (71.2)	17.9 (64.2)	23.3 (73.9)	
India	Gangtok	8.5 (47.3)	10.0 (50.0)	13.3 (55.9)	16.2 (61.2)	17.7 (63.9)	19.2 (66.6)	19.3 (66.7)	19.5 (67.1)	18.7 (65.7)	16.6 (61.9)	13.1 (55.6)	10.1 (50.2)	15.2 (59.4)	
India	New Delhi	13.4 (56.1)	16.8 (62.2)	22.4 (72.3)	29.1 (84.4)	32.7 (90.9)	32.9 (91.2)	29.9 (85.8)	28.8 (83.8)	27.9 (82.2)	25.5 (77.9)	20.5 (68.9)	15.3 (59.5)	24.6 (76.3)	
India	Kolkata	20.1 (68.2)	22.8 (73.0)	27.6 (81.7)	30.5 (86.9)	31.3 (88.3)	30.4 (86.7)	29.1 (84.4)	28.8 (83.8)	28.8 (83.8)	27.5 (81.5)	23.7 (74.7)	20.3 (68.5)	26.7 (80.1)	
India	Mumbai	23.7 (74.7)	24.5 (76.1)	26.8 (80.2)	28.4 (83.1)	29.9 (85.8)	29.2 (84.6)	27.6 (81.7)	27.2 (81.0)	27.3 (81.1)	28.3 (82.9)	27.2 (81.0)	25.2 (77.4)	27.1 (80.8)	
Indonesia	Jakarta	26.1 (79.0)	26.1 (79.0)	26.4 (79.5)	27.0 (80.6)	27.2 (81.0)	26.7 (80.1)	26.4 (79.5)	26.7 (80.1)	27.0 (80.6)	27.2 (81.0)	27.0 (80.6)	26.4 (79.5)	26.7 (80.1)	
Indonesia	Denpasar	24.1 (75.4)	24.2 (75.6)	24.0 (75.2)	24.8 (76.6)	24.1 (75.4)	23.5 (74.3)	22.5 (72.5)	22.9 (73.2)	23.0 (73.4)	23.7 (74.7)	23.5 (74.3)	23.5 (74.3)	23.7 (74.7)	
Indonesia	Jayapura	27.1 (80.8)	26.9 (80.4)	27.1 (80.8)	27.3 (81.1)	27.2 (81.0)	26.9 (80.4)	26.4 (79.5)	26.6 (79.9)	26.9 (80.4)	27.2 (81.0)	27.3 (81.1)	27.0 (80.6)	27.0 (80.6)	
Indonesia	Makassar	26.0 (78.8)	26.3 (79.3)	27.4 (81.3)	27.6 (81.7)	26.9 (80.4)	26.0 (78.8)	25.6 (78.1)	26.0 (78.8)	26.7 (80.1)	27.5 (81.5)	27.7 (81.9)	26.1 (79.0)	26.7 (80.1)	
Indonesia	Medan	25.6 (78.1)	26.1 (79.0)	26.7 (80.1)	27.2 (81.0)	27.3 (81.1)	27.1 (80.8)	27.0 (80.6)	26.9 (80.4)	26.6 (79.9)	26.1 (79.0)	26.0 (78.8)	25.8 (78.4)	26.5 (79.7)	
Indonesia	Palembang	26.8 (80.2)	27.1 (80.8)	27.2 (81.0)	27.7 (81.9)	28.0 (82.4)	27.4 (81.3)	27.0 (80.6)	27.2 (81.0)	27.5 (81.5)	27.7 (81.9)	27.4 (81.3)	27.0 (80.6)	27.3 (81.1)	
Indonesia	Pontianak	26.9 (80.4)	27.9 (82.2)	28.2 (82.8)	28.1 (82.6)	28.0 (82.4)	27.8 (82.0)	27.5 (81.5)	27.8 (82.0)	28.3 (82.9)	27.7 (81.9)	27.3 (81.1)	27.2 (81.0)	27.7 (81.9)	
Indonesia	Surabaya	26.8 (80.2)	26.8 (80.2)	27.0 (80.6)	27.3 (81.1)	27.3 (81.1)	26.7 (80.1)	26.2 (79.2)	26.5 (79.7)	27.2 (81.0)	28.2 (82.8)	28.3 (82.9)	27.3 (81.1)	27.1 (80.8)	
Iraq	Baghdad	9.7 (49.5)	12 (54)	16.6 (61.9)	22.6 (72.7)	28.3 (82.9)	32.3 (90.1)	34.8 (94.6)	34 (93)	30.5 (86.9)	24.7 (76.5)	16.5 (61.7)	11.2 (52.2)	22.77 (72.99)	
Iraq	Erbil	6.2 (43.2)	8.1 (46.6)	12.2 (54.0)	17.4 (63.3)	23.6 (74.5)	28.9 (84.0)	32.9 (91.2)	32.1 (89.8)	28.2 (82.8)	21.4 (70.5)	14.1 (57.4)	8.3 (46.9)	19.5 (67.1)	
Iran	Tehran	4.7 (40.5)	7 (45)	11.8 (53.2)	17.6 (63.7)	23.2 (73.8)	28.8 (83.8)	31.4 (88.5)	30.5 (86.9)	26.3 (79.3)	19.6 (67.3)	11.6 (52.9)	6.5 (43.7)	18.3 (64.9)	
Iran	Ahvaz	12.3 (54.1)	14.7 (58.5)	19.0 (66.2)	24.9 (76.8)	31.1 (88.0)	35.2 (95.4)	37.3 (99.1)	36.7 (98.1)	33.0 (91.4)	27.3 (81.1)	19.8 (67.6)	14.0 (57.2)	25.4 (77.7)	
Iran	Tabriz	−1.7 (28.9)	0.5 (32.9)	5.6 (42.1)	11.5 (52.7)	16.7 (62.1)	22.1 (71.8)	26.0 (78.8)	25.9 (78.6)	21.4 (70.5)	14.5 (58.1)	7.1 (44.8)	1.2 (34.2)	12.6 (54.7)	
Israel	Jerusalem	9.8 (49.6)	10.7 (51.3)	13.4 (56.1)	17.3 (63.1)	21.2 (70.2)	23.5 (74.3)	25.0 (77.0)	25.3 (77.5)	24.0 (75.2)	21.6 (70.9)	16.4 (61.5)	11.9 (53.4)	18.3 (64.9)	
Israel	Tel Aviv	12.9 (55.2)	13.4 (56.1)	16.4 (61.5)	19.2 (66.6)	21.8 (71.2)	24.8 (76.6)	27.0 (80.6)	27.8 (82.0)	26.5 (79.7)	22.7 (72.9)	17.6 (63.7)	13.9 (57.0)	20.3 (68.5)	
Japan	Sapporo	−3.6 (25.5)	−3.1 (26.4)	0.6 (33.1)	7.1 (44.8)	12.4 (54.3)	16.7 (62.1)	20.5 (68.9)	22.3 (72.1)	18.1 (64.6)	11.8 (53.2)	4.9 (40.8)	−0.9 (30.4)	8.9 (48.0)	
Japan	Niigata	2.8 (37.0)	2.9 (37.2)	5.8 (42.4)	11.5 (52.7)	16.5 (61.7)	20.7 (69.3)	24.5 (76.1)	26.6 (79.9)	22.5 (72.5)	16.4 (61.5)	10.5 (50.9)	5.6 (42.1)	13.9 (57.0)	
Japan	Tokyo	5.2 (41.4)	5.7 (42.3)	8.7 (47.7)	13.9 (57.0)	18.2 (64.8)	21.4 (70.5)	25.0 (77.0)	26.4 (79.5)	22.8 (73.0)	17.5 (63.5)	12.1 (53.8)	7.6 (45.7)	15.4 (59.7)	
Japan	Kyoto	4.6 (40.3)	5.1 (41.2)	8.4 (47.1)	14.2 (57.6)	19.0 (66.2)	23.0 (73.4)	26.8 (80.2)	28.2 (82.8)	24.1 (75.4)	17.8 (64.0)	12.1 (53.8)	7.0 (44.6)	15.8 (60.4)	
Japan	Hiroshima	5.2 (41.4)	6.0 (42.8)	9.1 (48.4)	14.7 (58.5)	19.3 (66.7)	23.0 (73.4)	27.1 (80.8)	28.2 (82.8)	24.4 (75.9)	18.3 (64.9)	12.5 (54.5)	7.5 (45.5)	16.3 (61.3)	
Japan	Fukuoka	6.6 (43.9)	7.4 (45.3)	10.4 (50.7)	15.1 (59.2)	19.4 (66.9)	23.0 (73.4)	27.2 (81.0)	28.1 (82.6)	24.4 (75.9)	19.2 (66.6)	13.8 (56.8)	8.9 (48.0)	17.0 (62.6)	
Japan	Naha	17.0 (62.6)	17.1 (62.8)	18.9 (66.0)	21.4 (70.5)	24.0 (75.2)	26.8 (80.2)	28.9 (84.0)	28.7 (83.7)	27.6 (81.7)	25.2 (77.4)	22.1 (71.8)	18.7 (65.7)	23.1 (73.6)	
Kazakhstan	Almaty	−4.7 (23.5)	−3.0 (26.6)	3.4 (38.1)	11.5 (52.7)	16.6 (61.9)	21.6 (70.9)	23.8 (74.8)	23.0 (73.4)	17.6 (63.7)	9.9 (49.8)	2.7 (36.9)	−2.8 (27.0)	10.0 (50.0)	
Kazakhstan	Astana	−14.2 (6.4)	−14.1 (6.6)	−7.1 (19.2)	5.2 (41.4)	13.9 (57.0)	19.5 (67.1)	20.8 (69.4)	18.8 (65.8)	12.3 (54.1)	4.6 (40.3)	−5.4 (22.3)	−12.1 (10.2)	3.5 (38.3)	
Kuwait	Kuwait City	12.5 (54.5)	14.8 (58.6)	19.3 (66.7)	24.9 (76.8)	31.5 (88.7)	36.0 (96.8)	37.7 (99.9)	36.8 (98.2)	33.3 (91.9)	27.3 (81.1)	19.9 (67.8)	14.1 (57.4)	25.7 (78.3)	
Kyrgyzstan	Bishkek	−2.6 (27.3)	−0.8 (30.6)	5.3 (41.5)	12.3 (54.1)	17.4 (63.3)	22.4 (72.3)	24.9 (76.8)	23.8 (74.8)	18.5 (65.3)	11.0 (51.8)	4.7 (40.5)	−0.9 (30.4)	11.3 (52.3)	
Laos	Vientiane	21.7 (71.1)	24.0 (75.2)	26.7 (80.1)	28.5 (83.3)	27.7 (81.9)	27.7 (81.9)	27.5 (81.5)	27.2 (81.0)	27.0 (80.6)	26.4 (79.5)	24.3 (75.7)	21.7 (71.1)	25.9 (78.6)	
Lebanon	Beirut	14.0 (57.2)	14.0 (57.2)	16.0 (60.8)	18.7 (65.7)	21.7 (71.1)	24.9 (76.8)	27.1 (80.8)	27.8 (82.0)	26.8 (80.2)	24.1 (75.4)	19.5 (67.1)	15.8 (60.4)	20.9 (69.6)	
Malaysia	Kuala Lumpur	26.9 (80.4)	27.3 (81.1)	27.6 (81.7)	27.7 (81.9)	28.0 (82.4)	27.9 (82.2)	27.4 (81.3)	27.5 (81.5)	27.2 (81.0)	27.1 (80.8)	26.8 (80.2)	26.7 (80.1)	27.3 (81.1)	
Maldives	Malé	27.7 (81.9)	28.0 (82.4)	28.5 (83.3)	28.9 (84.0)	28.6 (83.5)	28.2 (82.8)	28.0 (82.4)	27.8 (82.0)	27.6 (81.7)	27.6 (81.7)	27.7 (81.9)	27.5 (81.5)	28.0 (82.4)	
Mongolia	Ulaanbaatar	−21.6 (−6.9)	−16.6 (2.1)	−7.4 (18.7)	2.0 (35.6)	10.1 (50.2)	15.7 (60.3)	18.2 (64.8)	16.0 (60.8)	9.6 (49.3)	0.5 (32.9)	−11.9 (10.6)	−19.0 (−2.2)	−0.4 (31.3)	
Myanmar	Mandalay	21.9 (71.4)	24.4 (75.9)	28.8 (83.8)	31.9 (89.4)	31.3 (88.3)	30.8 (87.4)	30.8 (87.4)	30.2 (86.4)	29.7 (85.5)	28.8 (83.8)	25.7 (78.3)	22.2 (72.0)	28.0 (82.4)	
Myanmar	Yangon	25.0 (77.0)	26.3 (79.3)	28.6 (83.5)	30.6 (87.1)	29.6 (85.3)	27.4 (81.3)	26.9 (80.4)	26.9 (80.4)	27.4 (81.3)	27.9 (82.2)	27.4 (81.3)	25.4 (77.7)	27.5 (81.5)	
Nepal	Kathmandu	10.0 (50.0)	11.9 (53.4)	16.1 (61.0)	19.2 (66.6)	21.8 (71.2)	23.8 (74.8)	24.1 (75.4)	24.1 (75.4)	23.3 (73.9)	19.1 (66.4)	14.8 (58.6)	11.3 (52.3)	18.3 (64.9)	
North Korea	Pyongyang	−5.8 (21.6)	2.4 (36.3)	4.4 (39.9)	11.2 (52.2)	17.1 (62.8)	21.7 (71.1)	24.3 (75.7)	24.6 (76.3)	19.6 (67.3)	12.5 (54.5)	4.7 (40.5)	−2.9 (26.8)	10.8 (51.4)	
Oman	Muscat	21 (70)	22 (72)	25 (77)	30 (86)	34 (93)	35 (95)	34 (93)	32 (90)	31 (88)	30 (86)	25 (77)	22 (72)	28 (82)	
Pakistan	Karachi	18.1 (64.6)	20.2 (68.4)	24.5 (76.1)	28.3 (82.9)	30.5 (86.9)	31.4 (88.5)	30.3 (86.5)	28.9 (84.0)	28.9 (84.0)	27.9 (82.2)	23.9 (75.0)	19.5 (67.1)	26.0 (78.8)	
Pakistan	Lahore	12.8 (55.0)	15.4 (59.7)	20.5 (68.9)	26.8 (80.2)	31.2 (88.2)	33.9 (93.0)	31.5 (88.7)	30.7 (87.3)	29.7 (85.5)	25.6 (78.1)	19.5 (67.1)	14.2 (57.6)	24.3 (75.7)	
Philippines	Manila	26.7 (80.1)	27.4 (81.3)	28.7 (83.7)	30.1 (86.2)	30.0 (86.0)	29.3 (84.7)	28.5 (83.3)	28.3 (82.9)	28.4 (83.1)	28.4 (83.1)	28.0 (82.4)	27.0 (80.6)	28.4 (83.1)	
Philippines	Baguio	18.1 (64.6)	18.5 (65.3)	19.7 (67.5)	20.7 (69.3)	20.6 (69.1)	20.4 (68.7)	19.6 (67.3)	19.3 (66.7)	19.6 (67.3)	19.6 (67.3)	19.5 (67.1)	18.8 (65.8)	19.5 (67.1)	
Russia	Anadyr	−22.6 (−8.7)	−22.0 (−7.6)	−19.3 (−2.7)	−12.8 (9.0)	−1.6 (29.1)	6.3 (43.3)	11.6 (52.9)	10.1 (50.2)	4.7 (40.5)	−4.6 (23.7)	−13.3 (8.1)	−19.3 (−2.7)	−6.9 (19.6)	
Russia	Dikson	−24.8 (−12.6)	−25.4 (−13.7)	−22.1 (−7.8)	−17.2 (1.0)	−7.8 (18.0)	0.4 (32.7)	4.9 (40.8)	5.5 (41.9)	1.6 (34.9)	−7.5 (18.5)	−17.5 (0.5)	−22.9 (−9.2)	−11.1 (12.0)	
Russia	Irkutsk	−17.6 (0.3)	−14.1 (6.6)	−5.5 (22.1)	3.6 (38.5)	10.4 (50.7)	16.4 (61.5)	19.0 (66.2)	16.4 (61.5)	9.5 (49.1)	2.0 (35.6)	−8.0 (17.6)	−15.3 (4.5)	1.4 (34.5)	
Russia	Novosibirsk	−17.0 (1.4)	−14.4 (6.1)	−6.8 (19.8)	3.6 (38.5)	11.9 (53.4)	17.6 (63.7)	19.5 (67.1)	16.9 (62.4)	10.3 (50.5)	3.3 (37.9)	−6.8 (19.8)	−13.9 (7.0)	2.0 (35.6)	
Russia	Petropavlovsk- Kamchatsky	−7.6 (18.3)	−7.1 (19.2)	−4.6 (23.7)	−0.6 (30.9)	3.4 (38.1)	8.2 (46.8)	11.5 (52.7)	12.5 (54.5)	9.7 (49.5)	4.9 (40.8)	−1.3 (29.7)	−5.8 (21.6)	1.9 (35.4)	
Russia	Vladivostok	−12.3 (9.9)	−8.4 (16.9)	−1.9 (28.6)	5.1 (41.2)	9.8 (49.6)	13.6 (56.5)	17.6 (63.7)	19.8 (67.6)	16.0 (60.8)	8.9 (48.0)	−0.9 (30.4)	−9.1 (15.6)	4.9 (40.8)	
Russia	Yakutsk	−38.6 (−37.5)	−33.8 (−28.8)	−20.1 (−4.2)	−4.8 (23.4)	7.5 (45.5)	16.4 (61.5)	19.5 (67.1)	15.2 (59.4)	6.1 (43.0)	−7.8 (18.0)	−27.0 (−16.6)	−37.6 (−35.7)	−8.8 (16.2)	
Saudi Arabia	Abha	13.8 (56.8)	15.4 (59.7)	17.2 (63.0)	19.3 (66.7)	21.8 (71.2)	24.0 (75.2)	23.7 (74.7)	23.0 (73.4)	22.5 (72.5)	19.1 (66.4)	16.0 (60.8)	14.3 (57.7)	19.2 (66.6)	
Saudi Arabia	Mecca	24.3 (75.7)	25.4 (77.7)	27.8 (82.0)	31.3 (88.3)	34.6 (94.3)	36.2 (97.2)	36.2 (97.2)	35.9 (96.6)	35.2 (95.4)	32.5 (90.5)	28.7 (83.7)	25.9 (78.6)	31.2 (88.2)	
Saudi Arabia	Riyadh	14.0 (57.2)	16.7 (62.1)	21.0 (69.8)	26.4 (79.5)	32.2 (90.0)	35.2 (95.4)	36.3 (97.3)	36.0 (96.8)	32.8 (91.0)	27.5 (81.5)	20.4 (68.7)	15.4 (59.7)	26.2 (79.2)	
Singapore	Singapore	26.8 (80.2)	27.3 (81.1)	27.8 (82.0)	28.2 (82.8)	28.6 (83.5)	28.5 (83.3)	28.2 (82.8)	28.1 (82.6)	28.0 (82.4)	27.9 (82.2)	27.2 (81.0)	26.8 (80.2)	27.8 (82.0)	
South Korea	Seoul	−2.4 (27.7)	0.4 (32.7)	5.7 (42.3)	12.5 (54.5)	17.8 (64.0)	22.2 (72.0)	24.9 (76.8)	25.7 (78.3)	21.2 (70.2)	14.8 (58.6)	7.2 (45.0)	0.4 (32.7)	12.5 (54.5)	
South Korea	Busan	3.6 (38.5)	5.4 (41.7)	9.1 (48.4)	13.8 (56.8)	17.9 (64.2)	21.0 (69.8)	24.4 (75.9)	26.1 (79.0)	22.6 (72.7)	17.9 (64.2)	11.9 (53.4)	5.8 (42.4)	15.0 (59.0)	
Sri Lanka	Colombo	26.6 (79.9)	26.9 (80.4)	27.7 (81.9)	28.2 (82.8)	28.3 (82.9)	27.9 (82.2)	27.6 (81.7)	27.6 (81.7)	27.5 (81.5)	27.0 (80.6)	26.7 (80.1)	26.6 (79.9)	27.4 (81.3)	
Syria	Damascus	6.1 (43.0)	7.7 (45.9)	11.4 (52.5)	16.2 (61.2)	20.8 (69.4)	25.0 (77.0)	27.3 (81.1)	27.0 (80.6)	24.0 (75.2)	19.0 (66.2)	12.1 (53.8)	7.5 (45.5)	17.0 (62.6)	
Tajikistan	Dushanbe	2.1 (35.8)	3.8 (38.8)	9.2 (48.6)	15.4 (59.7)	20.0 (68.0)	25.3 (77.5)	27.1 (80.8)	24.9 (76.8)	20.1 (68.2)	14.3 (57.7)	8.9 (48.0)	4.8 (40.6)	14.7 (58.5)	
Taiwan	Taipei	16.4 (61.5)	16.9 (62.4)	18.8 (65.8)	22.3 (72.1)	25.6 (78.1)	28.2 (82.8)	29.9 (85.8)	29.5 (85.1)	27.7 (81.9)	24.6 (76.3)	21.9 (71.4)	18.2 (64.8)	23.3 (73.9)	
Thailand	Bangkok	27.0 (80.6)	28.3 (82.9)	29.5 (85.1)	30.5 (86.9)	29.9 (85.8)	29.5 (85.1)	29.0 (84.2)	28.8 (83.8)	28.3 (82.9)	28.1 (82.6)	27.8 (82.0)	26.5 (79.7)	28.6 (83.5)	
Thailand	Chiang Mai	21.5 (70.7)	23.9 (75.0)	27.1 (80.8)	29.3 (84.7)	28.2 (82.8)	27.6 (81.7)	27.2 (81.0)	26.8 (80.2)	26.7 (80.1)	26.1 (79.0)	24.0 (75.2)	21.4 (70.5)	25.8 (78.4)	
Thailand	Hat Yai	26.0 (78.8)	26.7 (80.1)	27.6 (81.7)	28.0 (82.4)	27.8 (82.0)	27.7 (81.9)	27.4 (81.3)	27.4 (81.3)	26.9 (80.4)	26.5 (79.7)	26.0 (78.8)	25.6 (78.1)	27.0 (80.6)	
Thailand	Nakhon Ratchasima	24.3 (75.7)	26.9 (80.4)	28.9 (84.0)	30.0 (86.0)	29.1 (84.4)	29.1 (84.4)	28.6 (83.5)	28.1 (82.6)	27.4 (81.3)	26.7 (80.1)	25.4 (77.7)	23.6 (74.5)	27.3 (81.1)	
Turkey	Ankara	0.4 (32.7)	1.9 (35.4)	6.0 (42.8)	11.3 (52.3)	16.1 (61.0)	20.1 (68.2)	23.6 (74.5)	23.4 (74.1)	18.8 (65.8)	13.0 (55.4)	7.0 (44.6)	2.6 (36.7)	12.0 (53.6)	
Turkey	Erzurum	−10.2 (13.6)	−8.7 (16.3)	−2.7 (27.1)	5.1 (41.2)	10.2 (50.4)	14.1 (57.4)	18.4 (65.1)	18.7 (65.7)	13.9 (57.0)	7.5 (45.5)	0.4 (32.7)	−6.7 (19.9)	5.1 (41.2)	
Turkey	İzmir	8.9 (48.0)	9.5 (49.1)	11.7 (53.1)	15.9 (60.6)	20.8 (69.4)	25.6 (78.1)	28.0 (82.4)	27.7 (81.9)	23.7 (74.7)	18.8 (65.8)	14.0 (57.2)	10.6 (51.1)	17.9 (64.2)	
Turkmenistan	Ashgabat	3.5 (38.3)	5.5 (41.9)	10.4 (50.7)	17.4 (63.3)	23.3 (73.9)	29.0 (84.2)	31.3 (88.3)	29.6 (85.3)	23.6 (74.5)	16.5 (61.7)	10.2 (50.4)	5.1 (41.2)	17.1 (62.8)	
United Arab; Emirates	Abu Dhabi	19.1 (66.4)	20.6 (69.1)	23.4 (74.1)	27.7 (81.9)	31.8 (89.2)	33.7 (92.7)	35.5 (95.9)	35.9 (96.6)	33.3 (91.9)	29.7 (85.5)	25.2 (77.4)	21.1 (70.0)	28.1 (82.6)	
United Arab; Emirates	Dubai	18.7 (65.7)	19.3 (66.7)	22.3 (72.1)	26.1 (79.0)	29.9 (85.8)	32.2 (90.0)	34.4 (93.9)	34.4 (93.9)	32.1 (89.8)	28.7 (83.7)	24.3 (75.7)	20.6 (69.1)	26.9 (80.4)	
Uzbekistan	Tashkent	1.9 (35.4)	3.9 (39.0)	9.4 (48.9)	15.5 (59.9)	20.5 (68.9)	25.8 (78.4)	27.8 (82.0)	26.2 (79.2)	20.6 (69.1)	13.9 (57.0)	8.5 (47.3)	3.5 (38.3)	14.8 (58.6)	
Vietnam	Da Lat	15.8 (60.4)	16.7 (62.1)	17.8 (64.0)	18.9 (66.0)	19.3 (66.7)	19.0 (66.2)	18.6 (65.5)	18.5 (65.3)	18.4 (65.1)	18.1 (64.6)	17.3 (63.1)	16.2 (61.2)	17.9 (64.2)	
Vietnam	Da Nang	21.5 (70.7)	22.3 (72.1)	24.2 (75.6)	26.4 (79.5)	28.3 (82.9)	29.2 (84.6)	29.3 (84.7)	29.0 (84.2)	27.5 (81.5)	25.9 (78.6)	24.1 (75.4)	22.1 (71.8)	25.8 (78.4)	
Vietnam	Hanoi	16.4 (61.5)	17.2 (63.0)	20.0 (68.0)	23.9 (75.0)	27.4 (81.3)	28.9 (84.0)	29.2 (84.6)	28.6 (83.5)	27.5 (81.5)	24.9 (76.8)	21.5 (70.7)	18.2 (64.8)	23.6 (74.5)	
Vietnam	Ho Chi Minh City	26.0 (78.8)	26.8 (80.2)	28.0 (82.4)	29.2 (84.6)	28.8 (83.8)	27.8 (82.0)	27.5 (81.5)	27.4 (81.3)	27.2 (81.0)	27.0 (80.6)	26.7 (80.1)	26.0 (78.8)	27.4 (81.3)	
Yemen	Aden	25.7 (78.3)	26.0 (78.8)	27.2 (81.0)	28.9 (84.0)	31.0 (87.8)	32.7 (90.9)	32.7 (90.9)	31.5 (88.7)	31.6 (88.9)	28.9 (84.0)	27.1 (80.8)	26.0 (78.8)	29.1 (84.4)	
Yemen	Sanaa	12.6 (54.7)	14.1 (57.4)	16.3 (61.3)	16.6 (61.9)	18.0 (64.4)	19.3 (66.7)	20.0 (68.0)	19.6 (67.3)	17.8 (64.0)	15.0 (59.0)	12.9 (55.2)	12.4 (54.3)	16.2 (61.2)	

== Europe ==
Average temperatures for selected cities in Europe °C (°F)
Country	City	Jan	Feb	Mar	Apr	May	Jun	Jul	Aug	Sep	Oct	Nov	Dec	Year	Ref.
Albania	Tirana	6.7 (44.1)	7.8 (46.0)	10.0 (50.0)	13.4 (56.1)	18.0 (64.4)	21.6 (70.9)	24.0 (75.2)	23.8 (74.8)	20.7 (69.3)	16.0 (60.8)	11.7 (53.1)	8.1 (46.6)	15.2 (59.4)	
Andorra	Andorra la Vella	2.2 (36.0)	3.5 (38.3)	5.8 (42.4)	7.5 (45.5)	11.5 (52.7)	15.4 (59.7)	18.8 (65.8)	18.5 (65.3)	14.9 (58.8)	10.3 (50.5)	5.7 (42.3)	3.0 (37.4)	9.8 (49.6)	
Austria	Vienna	0.3 (32.5)	1.5 (34.7)	5.7 (42.3)	10.7 (51.3)	15.7 (60.3)	18.7 (65.7)	20.8 (69.4)	20.2 (68.4)	15.4 (59.7)	10.2 (50.4)	5.1 (41.2)	1.1 (34.0)	10.4 (50.7)	
Belarus	Minsk	−4.5 (23.9)	−4.4 (24.1)	0.0 (32.0)	7.2 (45.0)	13.3 (55.9)	16.4 (61.5)	18.5 (65.3)	17.5 (63.5)	12.1 (53.8)	6.6 (43.9)	0.6 (33.1)	−3.4 (25.9)	6.7 (44.1)	
Belgium	Brussels	3.3 (37.9)	3.7 (38.7)	6.8 (44.2)	9.8 (49.6)	13.6 (56.5)	16.2 (61.2)	18.4 (65.1)	18.0 (64.4)	14.9 (58.8)	11.1 (52.0)	6.8 (44.2)	3.9 (39.0)	10.5 (50.9)	
Bosnia and Herzegovina	Sarajevo	−0.5 (31.1)	1.4 (34.5)	5.7 (42.3)	10.0 (50.0)	14.8 (58.6)	17.7 (63.9)	19.7 (67.5)	19.7 (67.5)	15.3 (59.5)	11.0 (51.8)	5.4 (41.7)	0.9 (33.6)	10.1 (50.2)	
Bulgaria	Sofia	−0.5 (31.1)	1.1 (34.0)	5.4 (41.7)	10.6 (51.1)	15.4 (59.7)	18.9 (66.0)	21.2 (70.2)	21.0 (69.8)	16.5 (61.7)	11.3 (52.3)	5.1 (41.2)	0.7 (33.3)	10.6 (51.1)	
Croatia	Zagreb	0.3 (32.5)	2.3 (36.1)	6.4 (43.5)	10.7 (51.3)	15.8 (60.4)	18.8 (65.8)	20.6 (69.1)	20.1 (68.2)	15.9 (60.6)	10.5 (50.9)	5.0 (41.0)	1.4 (34.5)	10.7 (51.3)	
Croatia	Split	8.0 (46.4)	8.4 (47.1)	10.6 (51.1)	13.7 (56.7)	18.9 (66.0)	22.8 (73.0)	25.7 (78.3)	25.4 (77.7)	21.2 (70.2)	16.8 (62.2)	12.0 (53.6)	9.1 (48.4)	16.1 (61.0)	
Cyprus	Nicosia	10.6 (51.1)	10.6 (51.1)	13.1 (55.6)	17.1 (62.8)	22.3 (72.1)	26.9 (80.4)	29.7 (85.5)	29.4 (84.9)	26.2 (79.2)	22.3 (72.1)	16.3 (61.3)	12.0 (53.6)	19.7 (67.5)	
Czech Republic	Prague	−1.4 (29.5)	−0.4 (31.3)	3.6 (38.5)	8.4 (47.1)	13.4 (56.1)	16.1 (61.0)	18.2 (64.8)	17.8 (64.0)	13.5 (56.3)	8.5 (47.3)	3.1 (37.6)	−0.3 (31.5)	8.4 (47.1)	
Denmark	Copenhagen	1.4 (34.5)	1.4 (34.5)	3.5 (38.3)	7.7 (45.9)	12.5 (54.5)	15.6 (60.1)	18.1 (64.6)	17.7 (63.9)	13.9 (57.0)	9.8 (49.6)	5.5 (41.9)	2.5 (36.5)	9.1 (48.4)	
Estonia	Tallinn	−2.9 (26.8)	−3.6 (25.5)	−0.6 (30.9)	4.8 (40.6)	10.2 (50.4)	14.5 (58.1)	17.6 (63.7)	16.5 (61.7)	12.0 (53.6)	6.5 (43.7)	2.0 (35.6)	−0.9 (30.4)	6.4 (43.5)	
Finland	Helsinki	−3.9 (25.0)	−4.7 (23.5)	−1.3 (29.7)	3.9 (39.0)	10.2 (50.4)	14.6 (58.3)	17.8 (64.0)	16.3 (61.3)	11.5 (52.7)	6.6 (43.9)	1.6 (34.9)	−2.0 (28.4)	5.9 (42.6)	
Finland	Kuopio	−9.2 (15.4)	−9.2 (15.4)	−4.1 (24.6)	2.0 (35.6)	9.1 (48.4)	14.5 (58.1)	17.5 (63.5)	15.0 (59.0)	9.7 (49.5)	4.1 (39.4)	−2.0 (28.4)	−6.7 (19.9)	3.4 (38.1)	
Finland	Oulu	−9.6 (14.7)	−9.3 (15.3)	−4.8 (23.4)	1.4 (34.5)	7.8 (46.0)	13.5 (56.3)	16.5 (61.7)	14.1 (57.4)	8.9 (48.0)	3.3 (37.9)	−2.8 (27.0)	−7.1 (19.2)	2.7 (36.9)	
France	Bordeaux	7.1 (44.8)	7.8 (46.0)	10.7 (51.3)	13.0 (55.4)	16.6 (61.9)	19.8 (67.6)	21.7 (71.1)	21.9 (71.4)	18.8 (65.8)	15.2 (59.4)	10.4 (50.7)	7.7 (45.9)	14.2 (57.6)	
France	Lyon	3.4 (38.1)	4.8 (40.6)	8.4 (47.1)	11.4 (52.5)	15.8 (60.4)	19.4 (66.9)	22.1 (71.8)	21.6 (70.9)	17.6 (63.7)	13.4 (56.1)	7.5 (45.5)	4.3 (39.7)	12.5 (54.5)	
France	Marseille	8.4 (47.1)	8.9 (48.0)	11.6 (52.9)	13.8 (56.8)	17.9 (64.2)	21.3 (70.3)	24.5 (76.1)	24.1 (75.4)	20.7 (69.3)	16.9 (62.4)	11.8 (53.2)	9.3 (48.7)	15.8 (60.4)	
France	Paris	4.9 (40.8)	5.6 (42.1)	8.8 (47.8)	11.4 (52.5)	15.1 (59.2)	18.2 (64.8)	20.4 (68.7)	20.2 (68.4)	16.9 (62.4)	12.9 (55.2)	8.1 (46.6)	5.4 (41.7)	12.3 (54.1)	
Germany	Berlin	0.6 (33.1)	2.3 (36.1)	5.1 (41.2)	10.2 (50.4)	14.8 (58.6)	17.9 (64.2)	20.3 (68.5)	19.7 (67.5)	15.3 (59.5)	10.5 (50.9)	6.0 (42.8)	1.3 (34.3)	10.3 (50.5)	
Germany	Frankfurt	1.6 (34.9)	2.4 (36.3)	6.4 (43.5)	10.3 (50.5)	14.7 (58.5)	17.8 (64.0)	20 (68)	19.5 (67.1)	15.2 (59.4)	10.4 (50.7)	5.6 (42.1)	2.5 (36.5)	10.6 (51.1)	
Germany	Hamburg	2.1 (35.8)	2.4 (36.3)	4.9 (40.8)	9.1 (48.4)	13.0 (55.4)	16.0 (60.8)	18.3 (64.9)	18.0 (64.4)	14.4 (57.9)	10.0 (50.0)	5.7 (42.3)	2.9 (37.2)	9.7 (49.5)	
Greece	Athens	10.2 (50.4)	10.9 (51.6)	13.2 (55.8)	16.9 (62.4)	21.8 (71.2)	26.6 (79.9)	29.3 (84.7)	29.3 (84.7)	25.0 (77.0)	20.1 (68.2)	15.5 (59.9)	11.5 (52.7)	19.2 (66.6)	
Greece	Heraklion	12.1 (53.8)	12.2 (54.0)	13.6 (56.5)	16.6 (61.9)	20.4 (68.7)	24.5 (76.1)	26.4 (79.5)	26.3 (79.3)	23.7 (74.7)	20.3 (68.5)	16.8 (62.2)	13.8 (56.8)	18.9 (66.0)	
Greece	Thessaloniki	7.0 (44.6)	8.4 (47.1)	11.2 (52.2)	14.9 (58.8)	20.0 (68.0)	24.7 (76.5)	27.0 (80.6)	27.1 (80.8)	22.7 (72.9)	17.7 (63.9)	12.8 (55.0)	8.3 (46.9)	16.8 (62.2)	
Hungary	Budapest	0.4 (32.7)	2.3 (36.1)	6.1 (43.0)	12.0 (53.6)	16.6 (61.9)	19.7 (67.5)	21.5 (70.7)	21.2 (70.2)	16.9 (62.4)	11.8 (53.2)	5.4 (41.7)	1.8 (35.2)	11.3 (52.3)	
Iceland	Reykjavík	−0.5 (31.1)	0.4 (32.7)	0.5 (32.9)	2.9 (37.2)	6.3 (43.3)	9.0 (48.2)	10.6 (51.1)	10.3 (50.5)	7.4 (45.3)	4.4 (39.9)	1.1 (34.0)	−0.2 (31.6)	4.3 (39.7)	
Ireland	Dublin	5.3 (41.5)	5.3 (41.5)	6.8 (44.2)	8.3 (46.9)	10.9 (51.6)	13.6 (56.5)	15.6 (60.1)	15.3 (59.5)	13.4 (56.1)	10.5 (50.9)	7.4 (45.3)	5.6 (42.1)	9.8 (49.6)	
Italy	Milan	2.5 (36.5)	4.7 (40.5)	9.0 (48.2)	12.2 (54.0)	17.0 (62.6)	20.8 (69.4)	23.6 (74.5)	23.0 (73.4)	19.2 (66.6)	13.4 (56.1)	7.2 (45.0)	3.3 (37.9)	13.0 (55.4)	
Italy	Palermo	12.5 (54.5)	12.6 (54.7)	13.5 (56.3)	15.7 (60.3)	18.9 (66.0)	22.4 (72.3)	25.6 (78.1)	26.2 (79.2)	24.1 (75.4)	20.3 (68.5)	16.8 (62.2)	13.7 (56.7)	18.5 (65.3)	
Italy	Rome	7.5 (45.5)	8.2 (46.8)	10.2 (50.4)	12.6 (54.7)	17.2 (63.0)	21.1 (70.0)	24.1 (75.4)	24.5 (76.1)	20.8 (69.4)	16.4 (61.5)	11.4 (52.5)	8.4 (47.1)	15.2 (59.4)	
Italy	Naples	8.7 (47.7)	8.8 (47.8)	11.1 (52.0)	13.2 (55.8)	17.8 (64.0)	21.4 (70.5)	24.3 (75.7)	24.7 (76.5)	21.4 (70.5)	17.1 (62.8)	12.4 (54.3)	9.8 (49.6)	15.9 (60.6)	
Latvia	Riga	−4.7 (23.5)	−4.2 (24.4)	0.5 (32.9)	5.1 (41.2)	11.4 (52.5)	15.5 (59.9)	16.9 (62.4)	16.2 (61.2)	12.0 (53.6)	7.4 (45.3)	2.1 (35.8)	−2.3 (27.9)	6.2 (43.2)	
Liechtenstein	Vaduz	0.8 (33.4)	2.1 (35.8)	6.3 (43.3)	9.9 (49.8)	14.4 (57.9)	17.1 (62.8)	19.0 (66.2)	18.4 (65.1)	14.9 (58.8)	10.9 (51.6)	5.2 (41.4)	1.9 (35.4)	10.1 (50.2)	
Lithuania	Vilnius	−3.9 (25.0)	−3.1 (26.4)	0.9 (33.6)	7.6 (45.7)	13.0 (55.4)	16.4 (61.5)	18.7 (65.7)	17.9 (64.2)	13.0 (55.4)	7.0 (44.6)	1.8 (35.2)	−2.2 (28.0)	7.3 (45.1)	
Luxembourg	Luxembourg	0.8 (33.4)	1.6 (34.9)	5.2 (41.4)	8.7 (47.7)	13.0 (55.4)	15.9 (60.6)	18.2 (64.8)	17.7 (63.9)	13.9 (57.0)	9.5 (49.1)	4.7 (40.5)	1.8 (35.2)	9.3 (48.7)	
Malta	Valletta	12.8 (55.0)	12.8 (55.0)	13.3 (55.9)	15.6 (60.1)	18.9 (66.0)	22.8 (73.0)	26.1 (79.0)	26.7 (80.1)	23.9 (75.0)	21.1 (70.0)	17.2 (63.0)	13.9 (57.0)	18.8 (65.8)	
Moldova	Chișinău	−1.9 (28.6)	−0.8 (30.6)	3.7 (38.7)	10.4 (50.7)	16.5 (61.7)	19.9 (67.8)	22.1 (71.8)	21.7 (71.1)	16.3 (61.3)	10.5 (50.9)	4.1 (39.4)	−0.6 (30.9)	10.2 (50.4)	
Monaco	Monaco	10.2 (50.4)	10.2 (50.4)	12.0 (53.6)	13.8 (56.8)	17.5 (63.5)	20.9 (69.6)	23.8 (74.8)	24.2 (75.6)	21.1 (70.0)	17.9 (64.2)	13.8 (56.8)	11.2 (52.2)	16.4 (61.5)	
Montenegro	Podgorica	5.0 (41.0)	6.8 (44.2)	10.0 (50.0)	13.9 (57.0)	19.0 (66.2)	22.8 (73.0)	26.0 (78.8)	25.6 (78.1)	21.4 (70.5)	15.9 (60.6)	10.5 (50.9)	6.5 (43.7)	15.3 (59.5)	
Netherlands	Amsterdam	3.4 (38.1)	3.5 (38.3)	6.1 (43.0)	9.1 (48.4)	12.9 (55.2)	15.4 (59.7)	17.6 (63.7)	17.5 (63.5)	14.7 (58.5)	11.0 (51.8)	7.1 (44.8)	4.0 (39.2)	10.2 (50.4)	
North Macedonia	Skopje	0.1 (32.2)	2.6 (36.7)	7.6 (45.7)	12.1 (53.8)	17.3 (63.1)	21.5 (70.7)	23.8 (74.8)	23.8 (74.8)	18.8 (65.8)	13.1 (55.6)	6.5 (43.7)	1.7 (35.1)	12.4 (54.3)	
Norway	Bergen	2.6 (36.7)	2.4 (36.3)	3.8 (38.8)	7.1 (44.8)	10.6 (51.1)	13.5 (56.3)	15.5 (59.9)	15.4 (59.7)	12.7 (54.9)	8.7 (47.7)	5.3 (41.5)	3.1 (37.6)	7.7 (45.9)	
Norway	Oslo	−4.3 (24.3)	−4.0 (24.8)	−0.2 (31.6)	4.5 (40.1)	10.8 (51.4)	15.2 (59.4)	16.4 (61.5)	15.2 (59.4)	10.8 (51.4)	6.3 (43.3)	0.7 (33.3)	−3.1 (26.4)	5.7 (42.3)	
Norway	Tromsø	−3.8 (25.2)	−3.7 (25.3)	−2.3 (27.9)	0.7 (33.3)	5.1 (41.2)	9.2 (48.6)	11.8 (53.2)	10.9 (51.6)	6.9 (44.4)	3.2 (37.8)	−0.6 (30.9)	−2.7 (27.1)	2.9 (37.2)	
Norway	Longyearbyen	−10.9 (12.4)	−11.6 (11.1)	−12.0 (10.4)	−8.8 (16.2)	−2.2 (28.0)	3.6 (38.5)	7.0 (44.6)	6.0 (42.8)	2.0 (35.6)	−3.8 (25.2)	−6.4 (20.5)	−9.2 (15.4)	−3.9 (25.0)	
Poland	Kraków	−1.0 (30.2)	0.4 (32.7)	4.1 (39.4)	9.8 (49.6)	14.6 (58.3)	18.3 (64.9)	20.0 (68.0)	19.2 (66.6)	14.1 (57.4)	9.2 (48.6)	4.4 (39.9)	0.2 (32.4)	9.3 (48.7)	
Poland	Suwałki	−3.3 (26.1)	−2.6 (27.3)	0.9 (33.6)	7.3 (45.1)	12.6 (54.7)	15.9 (60.6)	18.1 (64.6)	17.4 (63.3)	12.5 (54.5)	7.0 (44.6)	2.3 (36.1)	−1.6 (29.1)	7.2 (45.0)	
Poland	Warsaw	−1.8 (28.8)	−0.6 (30.9)	2.8 (37.0)	8.7 (47.7)	14.2 (57.6)	17.0 (62.6)	19.2 (66.6)	18.3 (64.9)	13.5 (56.3)	8.5 (47.3)	3.3 (37.9)	−0.7 (30.7)	8.5 (47.3)	
Poland	Wrocław	0.0 (32.0)	1.1 (34.0)	4.3 (39.7)	9.7 (49.5)	14.3 (57.7)	17.7 (63.9)	19.7 (67.5)	19.3 (66.7)	14.5 (58.1)	9.6 (49.3)	4.8 (40.6)	1.1 (34.0)	9.6 (49.3)	
Portugal	Lisbon	11.6 (52.9)	12.7 (54.9)	14.9 (58.8)	15.9 (60.6)	18.0 (64.4)	21.2 (70.2)	23.1 (73.6)	23.5 (74.3)	22.1 (71.8)	18.8 (65.8)	15.0 (59.0)	12.4 (54.3)	17.5 (63.5)	
Portugal	Porto	10.2 (50.4)	10.9 (51.6)	13.5 (56.3)	14.6 (58.3)	17.0 (62.6)	19.5 (67.1)	21.3 (70.3)	21.4 (70.5)	19.3 (66.7)	16.6 (61.9)	13.4 (56.1)	11.0 (51.8)	15.7 (60.3)	
Romania	Bucharest	−1.3 (29.7)	0.4 (32.7)	5.4 (41.7)	11.2 (52.2)	16.8 (62.2)	20.6 (69.1)	22.5 (72.5)	22.0 (71.6)	16.9 (62.4)	11.0 (51.8)	4.7 (40.5)	0.2 (32.4)	10.8 (51.4)	
Russia	Arkhangelsk	−12.7 (9.1)	−11.4 (11.5)	−5.5 (22.1)	0.4 (32.7)	6.9 (44.4)	13.0 (55.4)	16.3 (61.3)	13.1 (55.6)	8.2 (46.8)	2.3 (36.1)	−5.1 (22.8)	−9.8 (14.4)	1.3 (34.3)	
Russia	Moscow	−6.5 (20.3)	−6.7 (19.9)	−1.0 (30.2)	6.7 (44.1)	13.2 (55.8)	17.0 (62.6)	19.2 (66.6)	17.0 (62.6)	11.3 (52.3)	5.6 (42.1)	−1.2 (29.8)	−5.2 (22.6)	5.8 (42.4)	
Russia	Murmansk	−10.1 (13.8)	−9.7 (14.5)	−5.5 (22.1)	−0.7 (30.7)	4.0 (39.2)	9.2 (48.6)	12.8 (55.0)	11.1 (52.0)	7.0 (44.6)	1.5 (34.7)	−4.8 (23.4)	−8.2 (17.2)	0.6 (33.1)	
Russia	Rostov-on-Don	−3.0 (26.6)	−2.8 (27.0)	2.4 (36.3)	10.6 (51.1)	16.6 (61.9)	21.0 (69.8)	23.4 (74.1)	22.6 (72.7)	16.7 (62.1)	10.0 (50.0)	2.9 (37.2)	−1.6 (29.1)	9.9 (49.8)	
Russia	Saint Petersburg	−5.5 (22.1)	−5.8 (21.6)	−1.3 (29.7)	5.1 (41.2)	11.3 (52.3)	15.7 (60.3)	18.8 (65.8)	16.9 (62.4)	11.6 (52.9)	6.2 (43.2)	0.1 (32.2)	−3.7 (25.3)	5.8 (42.4)	
Russia	Sochi	6.1 (43.0)	6.0 (42.8)	8.2 (46.8)	12.1 (53.8)	16.0 (60.8)	20.2 (68.4)	23.2 (73.8)	23.6 (74.5)	20.0 (68.0)	15.8 (60.4)	11.1 (52.0)	8.1 (46.6)	14.2 (57.6)	
San Marino	San Marino	2.7 (36.9)	4.2 (39.6)	6.4 (43.5)	10.1 (50.2)	14.6 (58.3)	18.5 (65.3)	21.3 (70.3)	21.4 (70.5)	17.8 (64.0)	12.8 (55.0)	8.0 (46.4)	4.2 (39.6)	11.8 (53.2)	
Serbia	Belgrade	1.4 (34.5)	3.1 (37.6)	7.6 (45.7)	12.9 (55.2)	18.1 (64.6)	21.0 (69.8)	23.0 (73.4)	22.7 (72.9)	18.0 (64.4)	12.9 (55.2)	7.1 (44.8)	2.7 (36.9)	12.5 (54.5)	
Slovakia	Bratislava	0.3 (32.5)	1.9 (35.4)	6.1 (43.0)	11.7 (53.1)	16.2 (61.2)	20.2 (68.4)	22.0 (71.6)	21.5 (70.7)	16.2 (61.2)	10.7 (51.3)	5.7 (42.3)	1.1 (34.0)	11.1 (52.0)	
Slovenia	Ljubljana	0.3 (32.5)	1.9 (35.4)	6.5 (43.7)	10.8 (51.4)	15.8 (60.4)	19.1 (66.4)	21.3 (70.3)	20.6 (69.1)	16.0 (60.8)	11.2 (52.2)	5.6 (42.1)	1.2 (34.2)	10.9 (51.6)	
Spain	Barcelona	11.3 (52.3)	11.3 (52.3)	13.1 (55.6)	15.1 (59.2)	18.1 (64.6)	21.9 (71.4)	24.7 (76.5)	25.2 (77.4)	22.4 (72.3)	19.1 (66.4)	14.4 (57.9)	11.9 (53.4)	17.4 (63.3)	
Spain	Bilbao	9.5 (49.1)	9.7 (49.5)	11.6 (52.9)	13.1 (55.6)	16.0 (60.8)	18.7 (65.7)	20.6 (69.1)	21.2 (70.2)	19.2 (66.6)	16.6 (61.9)	12.5 (54.5)	10.1 (50.2)	14.9 (58.8)	
Spain	Madrid	6.5 (43.7)	8.0 (46.4)	11.3 (52.3)	13.6 (56.5)	17.5 (63.5)	22.8 (73.0)	26.2 (79.2)	25.7 (78.3)	21.0 (69.8)	15.4 (59.7)	10.0 (50.0)	7.0 (44.6)	15.4 (59.7)	
Spain	Seville	11.2 (52.2)	12.7 (54.9)	15.6 (60.1)	17.8 (64.0)	21.6 (70.9)	25.7 (78.3)	28.5 (83.3)	28.6 (83.5)	25.0 (77.0)	20.6 (69.1)	15.2 (59.4)	12.2 (54.0)	19.6 (67.3)	
Spain	Valencia	12.1 (53.8)	12.7 (54.9)	14.7 (58.5)	16.6 (61.9)	19.6 (67.3)	23.3 (73.9)	25.9 (78.6)	26.5 (79.7)	23.7 (74.7)	20.1 (68.2)	15.6 (60.1)	12.8 (55.0)	18.6 (65.5)	
Sweden	Stockholm	−2.8 (27.0)	−3.0 (26.6)	0.1 (32.2)	4.6 (40.3)	10.7 (51.3)	15.6 (60.1)	17.2 (63.0)	16.2 (61.2)	11.9 (53.4)	7.5 (45.5)	2.6 (36.7)	−1.0 (30.2)	6.6 (43.9)	
Sweden	Umeå	−6.2 (20.8)	−6.5 (20.3)	−2.8 (27.0)	2.2 (36.0)	7.8 (46.0)	12.9 (55.2)	16.0 (60.8)	14.5 (58.1)	9.7 (49.5)	3.7 (38.7)	−0.8 (30.6)	−4.1 (24.6)	3.9 (39.0)	
Switzerland	Zürich	0.3 (32.5)	1.3 (34.3)	5.3 (41.5)	8.8 (47.8)	13.3 (55.9)	16.4 (61.5)	18.6 (65.5)	18.0 (64.4)	14.1 (57.4)	9.9 (49.8)	4.4 (39.9)	1.4 (34.5)	9.3 (48.7)	
Turkey	Istanbul	5.7 (42.3)	5.7 (42.3)	7.0 (44.6)	11.1 (52.0)	15.7 (60.3)	20.4 (68.7)	22.9 (73.2)	23.1 (73.6)	19.8 (67.6)	15.6 (60.1)	11.5 (52.7)	8.0 (46.4)	13.9 (57.0)	
Ukraine	Kyiv	−3.5 (25.7)	−3.0 (26.6)	1.8 (35.2)	9.3 (48.7)	15.5 (59.9)	18.5 (65.3)	20.5 (68.9)	19.7 (67.5)	14.2 (57.6)	8.4 (47.1)	1.9 (35.4)	−2.3 (27.9)	8.4 (47.1)	
Ukraine	Lviv	−3.1 (26.4)	−2.2 (28.0)	1.9 (35.4)	8.3 (46.9)	13.8 (56.8)	16.4 (61.5)	18.3 (64.9)	17.7 (63.9)	13.0 (55.4)	8.1 (46.6)	2.6 (36.7)	−1.8 (28.8)	7.8 (46.0)	
Ukraine	Odesa	−0.5 (31.1)	−0.2 (31.6)	3.5 (38.3)	9.4 (48.9)	15.6 (60.1)	20.0 (68.0)	22.6 (72.7)	22.3 (72.1)	17.2 (63.0)	11.6 (52.9)	5.7 (42.3)	1.1 (34.0)	10.7 (51.3)	
United Kingdom	Edinburgh	4.2 (39.6)	4.5 (40.1)	6.2 (43.2)	8.1 (46.6)	10.8 (51.4)	13.5 (56.3)	15.3 (59.5)	15.2 (59.4)	13.0 (55.4)	9.8 (49.6)	6.7 (44.1)	4.2 (39.6)	9.3 (48.7)	
United Kingdom	London	5.2 (41.4)	5.3 (41.5)	7.6 (45.7)	9.9 (49.8)	13.3 (55.9)	16.5 (61.7)	18.7 (65.7)	18.5 (65.3)	15.7 (60.3)	12.0 (53.6)	8.0 (46.4)	5.5 (41.9)	11.3 (52.3)	

== North America ==
Average temperatures for selected cities in North America °C (°F)
Country	City	Jan	Feb	Mar	Apr	May	Jun	Jul	Aug	Sep	Oct	Nov	Dec	Year	Ref.
Antigua and Barbuda	St. John's	25.4 (77.7)	25.2 (77.4)	25.6 (78.1)	26.3 (79.3)	27.2 (81.0)	27.9 (82.2)	28.2 (82.8)	28.3 (82.9)	28.1 (82.6)	27.5 (81.5)	26.8 (80.2)	25.9 (78.6)	26.9 (80.4)	
Aruba	Oranjestad	26.7 (80.1)	26.8 (80.2)	27.2 (81.0)	27.9 (82.2)	28.5 (83.3)	28.7 (83.7)	28.6 (83.5)	29.1 (84.4)	29.2 (84.6)	28.7 (83.7)	28.1 (82.6)	27.2 (81.0)	28.1 (82.6)	
The Bahamas	Nassau	21.1 (70.0)	21.1 (70.0)	22.2 (72.0)	23.4 (74.1)	25.3 (77.5)	26.9 (80.4)	27.9 (82.2)	27.9 (82.2)	27.3 (81.1)	25.9 (78.6)	23.8 (74.8)	21.9 (71.4)	24.6 (76.3)	
Barbados	Bridgetown	25.8 (78.4)	25.7 (78.3)	26.2 (79.2)	26.8 (80.2)	27.6 (81.7)	27.7 (81.9)	27.6 (81.7)	27.8 (82.0)	27.7 (81.9)	27.5 (81.5)	27.0 (80.6)	26.4 (79.5)	27.0 (80.6)	
Belize	Belize City	24.0 (75.2)	24.9 (76.8)	25.9 (78.6)	27.3 (81.1)	28.3 (82.9)	28.5 (83.3)	28.1 (82.6)	28.2 (82.8)	28.0 (82.4)	27.0 (80.6)	25.6 (78.1)	24.5 (76.1)	26.7 (80.1)	
Bermuda	Hamilton	18.3 (64.9)	18.0 (64.4)	18.2 (64.8)	19.6 (67.3)	22.0 (71.6)	25.0 (77.0)	27.2 (81.0)	27.6 (81.7)	26.6 (79.9)	24.4 (75.9)	21.6 (70.9)	19.5 (67.1)	22.3 (72.1)	
Canada	Alert	−30.7 (−23.3)	−31.4 (−24.5)	−31.0 (−23.8)	−23.3 (−9.9)	−11.1 (12.0)	−0.1 (31.8)	3.9 (39.0)	−1.2 (29.8)	−8.0 (17.6)	−17.2 (1.0)	−24.1 (−11.4)	−28.1 (−18.6)	−16.7 (1.9)	
Canada	Calgary	−7.6 (18.3)	−5.9 (21.4)	−2.2 (28.0)	4.5 (40.1)	9.9 (49.8)	13.7 (56.7)	16.9 (62.4)	16.2 (61.2)	11.5 (52.7)	4.9 (40.8)	−1.7 (28.9)	−6.3 (20.7)	4.5 (40.1)	
Canada	Edmonton	−10.3 (13.5)	−7.9 (17.8)	−3.1 (26.4)	4.9 (40.8)	11.6 (52.9)	15.6 (60.1)	18.1 (64.6)	17.0 (62.6)	11.9 (53.4)	5.0 (41.0)	−3.5 (25.7)	−9.0 (15.8)	4.2 (39.6)	
Canada	Gjoa Haven	−32.8 (−27.0)	−33.4 (−28.1)	−29.1 (−20.4)	−20.2 (−4.4)	−9.0 (15.8)	1.7 (35.1)	8.3 (46.9)	6.5 (43.7)	0.4 (32.7)	−8.4 (16.9)	−20.7 (−5.3)	−28.1 (−18.6)	−13.7 (7.3)	
Canada	Halifax	−5.7 (21.7)	−5.2 (22.6)	−0.9 (30.4)	4.5 (40.1)	10.1 (50.2)	15.2 (59.4)	19.2 (66.6)	19.2 (66.6)	15.2 (59.4)	9.2 (48.6)	3.8 (38.8)	−1.9 (28.6)	6.9 (44.4)	
Canada	Iqaluit	−26.0 (−14.8)	−27.0 (−16.6)	−22.4 (−8.3)	−13.5 (7.7)	−3.2 (26.2)	3.9 (39.0)	8.1 (46.6)	7.5 (45.5)	2.9 (37.2)	−3.2 (26.2)	−11.1 (12.0)	−18.9 (−2.0)	−8.6 (16.5)	
Canada	Moncton	−8.4 (16.9)	−7.6 (18.3)	−2.6 (27.3)	3.6 (38.5)	10.0 (50.0)	15.3 (59.5)	19.3 (66.7)	18.7 (65.7)	14.2 (57.6)	8.1 (46.6)	2.1 (35.8)	−4.4 (24.1)	5.7 (42.3)	
Canada	Montreal	−9.2 (15.4)	−8.0 (17.6)	−2.0 (28.4)	6.2 (43.2)	13.9 (57.0)	19.0 (66.2)	21.7 (71.1)	20.6 (69.1)	16.0 (60.8)	8.9 (48.0)	2.3 (36.1)	−5.0 (23.0)	7.0 (44.6)	
Canada	Ottawa	−9.6 (14.7)	−8.1 (17.4)	−2.2 (28.0)	6.2 (43.2)	13.8 (56.8)	18.8 (65.8)	21.3 (70.3)	20.1 (68.2)	15.6 (60.1)	8.8 (47.8)	2.0 (35.6)	−5.1 (22.8)	6.8 (44.2)	
Canada	Saskatoon	−15.4 (4.3)	−13.4 (7.9)	−6.1 (21.0)	3.9 (39.0)	10.9 (51.6)	15.6 (60.1)	18.3 (64.9)	17.4 (63.3)	11.9 (53.4)	3.7 (38.7)	−5.6 (21.9)	−13.0 (8.6)	2.4 (36.3)	
Canada	St. John's	−4.2 (24.4)	−4.7 (23.5)	−2.2 (28.0)	1.8 (35.2)	6.3 (43.3)	10.8 (51.4)	16.0 (60.8)	16.5 (61.7)	12.8 (55.0)	7.8 (46.0)	3.4 (38.1)	−1.0 (30.2)	5.3 (41.5)	
Canada	Toronto	−3.5 (25.7)	−2.7 (27.1)	1.7 (35.1)	7.8 (46.0)	14.5 (58.1)	19.8 (67.6)	22.5 (72.5)	21.9 (71.4)	17.9 (64.2)	11.2 (52.2)	5.2 (41.4)	−0.1 (31.8)	9.7 (49.5)	
Canada	Vancouver	4.1 (39.4)	4.7 (40.5)	6.7 (44.1)	9.4 (48.9)	13.0 (55.4)	15.8 (60.4)	18.2 (64.8)	18.2 (64.8)	15.2 (59.4)	10.3 (50.5)	6.4 (43.5)	3.9 (39.0)	10.5 (50.9)	
Canada	Winnipeg	−16.3 (2.7)	−14.1 (6.6)	−6.1 (21.0)	3.8 (38.8)	11.1 (52.0)	17.1 (62.8)	19.5 (67.1)	18.7 (65.7)	13.3 (55.9)	5.1 (41.2)	−4.4 (24.1)	−13.7 (7.3)	2.9 (37.2)	
Canada	Whitehorse	−15.0 (5.0)	−11.9 (10.6)	−6.7 (19.9)	1.6 (34.9)	7.9 (46.2)	12.8 (55.0)	14.5 (58.1)	12.9 (55.2)	7.5 (45.5)	0.8 (33.4)	−8.6 (16.5)	−12.8 (9.0)	0.2 (32.4)	
Canada	Yellowknife	−25.5 (−13.9)	−22.7 (−8.9)	−16.6 (2.1)	−5.5 (22.1)	5.3 (41.5)	13.8 (56.8)	17.1 (62.8)	14.5 (58.1)	7.6 (45.7)	−1.0 (30.2)	−12.6 (9.3)	−21.8 (−7.2)	−4.0 (24.8)	
Cayman Islands	George Town	25.8 (78.4)	26.1 (79.0)	26.6 (79.9)	27.6 (81.7)	28.5 (83.3)	29.2 (84.6)	29.6 (85.3)	29.7 (85.5)	29.3 (84.7)	28.5 (83.3)	27.5 (81.5)	26.2 (79.2)	27.9 (82.2)	
Costa Rica	San José	22.6 (72.7)	23.0 (73.4)	23.5 (74.3)	23.7 (74.7)	22.9 (73.2)	22.5 (72.5)	22.6 (72.7)	22.4 (72.3)	22.0 (71.6)	21.8 (71.2)	21.9 (71.4)	22.3 (72.1)	22.6 (72.7)	
Cuba	Havana	22.2 (72.0)	22.4 (72.3)	23.7 (74.7)	24.8 (76.6)	26.1 (79.0)	27.0 (80.6)	27.6 (81.7)	27.9 (82.2)	27.4 (81.3)	26.1 (79.0)	24.5 (76.1)	23.0 (73.4)	25.2 (77.4)	
Curaçao	Willemstad	26.6 (79.9)	26.7 (80.1)	27.2 (81.0)	27.8 (82.0)	28.4 (83.1)	28.6 (83.5)	28.5 (83.3)	28.9 (84.0)	29.1 (84.4)	28.6 (83.5)	28.0 (82.4)	27.2 (81.0)	28.0 (82.4)	
Dominica	Roseau	24.9 (76.8)	24.8 (76.6)	25.1 (77.2)	25.8 (78.4)	26.6 (79.9)	27.3 (81.1)	27.4 (81.3)	27.4 (81.3)	27.1 (80.8)	26.1 (79.0)	26.2 (79.2)	25.4 (77.7)	26.2 (79.2)	
Dominican Republic	Santo Domingo	24.4 (75.9)	24.4 (75.9)	24.9 (76.8)	25.6 (78.1)	26.3 (79.3)	26.9 (80.4)	27.0 (80.6)	27.1 (80.8)	27.0 (80.6)	26.7 (80.1)	26.0 (78.8)	24.9 (76.8)	25.9 (78.6)	
El Salvador	San Salvador	22.2 (72.0)	22.8 (73.0)	23.8 (74.8)	24.5 (76.1)	24.2 (75.6)	23.3 (73.9)	23.3 (73.9)	23.2 (73.8)	22.8 (73.0)	22.8 (73.0)	22.4 (72.3)	22.0 (71.6)	23.1 (73.6)	
Greenland	Nuuk	−7.4 (18.7)	−7.8 (18.0)	−8.0 (17.6)	−3.8 (25.2)	0.6 (33.1)	3.9 (39.0)	6.5 (43.7)	6.1 (43.0)	3.5 (38.3)	−0.7 (30.7)	−3.7 (25.3)	−6.2 (20.8)	−1.4 (29.5)	
Guatemala	Flores	23.0 (73.4)	24.4 (75.9)	25.7 (78.3)	28.2 (82.8)	28.8 (83.8)	28.2 (82.8)	27.6 (81.7)	28.0 (82.4)	27.9 (82.2)	26.6 (79.9)	24.9 (76.8)	23.6 (74.5)	26.4 (79.5)	
Guatemala	Guatemala City	17.7 (63.9)	20.7 (69.3)	20.7 (69.3)	23.4 (74.1)	23.9 (75.0)	21.0 (69.8)	20.8 (69.4)	21.0 (69.8)	20.7 (69.3)	20.3 (68.5)	19.4 (66.9)	17.5 (63.5)	20.4 (68.7)	
Honduras	La Ceiba	23.8 (74.8)	24.0 (75.2)	25.6 (78.1)	26.8 (80.2)	28.2 (82.8)	28.0 (82.4)	27.5 (81.5)	27.6 (81.7)	27.4 (81.3)	26.2 (79.2)	25.2 (77.4)	24.3 (75.7)	26.2 (79.2)	
Honduras	Tegucigalpa	19.5 (67.1)	20.4 (68.7)	22.1 (71.8)	23.4 (74.1)	23.6 (74.5)	22.6 (72.7)	22.1 (71.8)	22.4 (72.3)	22.2 (72.0)	21.5 (70.7)	20.4 (68.7)	19.7 (67.5)	21.7 (71.1)	
Jamaica	Kingston	25.8 (78.4)	25.9 (78.6)	26.4 (79.5)	26.9 (80.4)	27.8 (82.0)	28.5 (83.3)	28.9 (84.0)	28.7 (83.7)	28.4 (83.1)	27.7 (81.9)	27.2 (81.0)	26.7 (80.1)	27.4 (81.3)	
Mexico	Cabo San Lucas	19.2 (66.6)	19.3 (66.7)	20.2 (68.4)	22.2 (72.0)	23.8 (74.8)	25.3 (77.5)	28.1 (82.6)	29.0 (84.2)	28.4 (83.1)	26.7 (80.1)	23.5 (74.3)	20.6 (69.1)	23.9 (75.0)	
Mexico	Chihuahua	10.0 (50.0)	12.9 (55.2)	15.7 (60.3)	19.2 (66.6)	23.6 (74.5)	26.3 (79.3)	25.6 (78.1)	24.3 (75.7)	22.6 (72.7)	18.7 (65.7)	13.7 (56.7)	10.3 (50.5)	18.6 (65.5)	
Mexico	Guadalajara	17.1 (62.8)	18.4 (65.1)	20.7 (69.3)	22.8 (73.0)	24.5 (76.1)	23.9 (75.0)	22.0 (71.6)	21.9 (71.4)	21.8 (71.2)	21.0 (69.8)	19.2 (66.6)	17.5 (63.5)	20.9 (69.6)	
Mexico	La Paz	17.4 (63.3)	18.1 (64.6)	19.7 (67.5)	22.1 (71.8)	24.5 (76.1)	27.1 (80.8)	29.7 (85.5)	30.2 (86.4)	29.3 (84.7)	26.2 (79.2)	22.0 (71.6)	18.6 (65.5)	23.7 (74.7)	
Mexico	Mexicali	13.1 (55.6)	15.3 (59.5)	18.0 (64.4)	21.3 (70.3)	25.8 (78.4)	30.5 (86.9)	33.9 (93.0)	33.5 (92.3)	30.4 (86.7)	24.3 (75.7)	17.5 (63.5)	13.1 (55.6)	23.1 (73.6)	
Mexico	Mexico City	14.6 (58.3)	15.9 (60.6)	18.1 (64.6)	19.6 (67.3)	20.0 (68.0)	19.4 (66.9)	18.2 (64.8)	18.3 (64.9)	18.0 (64.4)	17.1 (62.8)	16.3 (61.3)	15.0 (59.0)	17.5 (63.5)	
Mexico	Monterrey	14.4 (57.9)	16.6 (61.9)	20 (68)	23.4 (74.1)	26.2 (79.2)	27.9 (82.2)	28.6 (83.5)	28.5 (83.3)	26.2 (79.2)	22.4 (72.3)	18.4 (65.1)	15.1 (59.2)	22.3 (72.1)	
Mexico	Tijuana	13.6 (56.5)	14.3 (57.7)	14.8 (58.6)	16.1 (61.0)	18.0 (64.4)	19.8 (67.6)	22.2 (72.0)	22.8 (73.0)	22.0 (71.6)	19.5 (67.1)	16.6 (61.9)	14.0 (57.2)	17.8 (64.0)	
Mexico	Toluca	8.9 (48.0)	10.1 (50.2)	11.8 (53.2)	13.5 (56.3)	14.7 (58.5)	14.8 (58.6)	14.0 (57.2)	14.0 (57.2)	13.9 (57.0)	12.4 (54.3)	10.8 (51.4)	9.5 (49.1)	12.4 (54.3)	
Mexico	Veracruz	21.5 (70.7)	21.9 (71.4)	24.0 (75.2)	25.8 (78.4)	27.8 (82.0)	28.1 (82.6)	27.5 (81.5)	27.6 (81.7)	27.2 (81.0)	26.2 (79.2)	24.2 (75.6)	22.6 (72.7)	25.4 (77.7)	
Mexico	Villahermosa	23.6 (74.5)	24.5 (76.1)	26.6 (79.9)	28.5 (83.3)	29.6 (85.3)	29.3 (84.7)	28.9 (84.0)	28.9 (84.0)	28.4 (83.1)	27.1 (80.8)	25.7 (78.3)	24.1 (75.4)	27.1 (80.8)	
Nicaragua	Managua	26.3 (79.3)	27.2 (81.0)	28.5 (83.3)	29.3 (84.7)	29.3 (84.7)	27.2 (81.0)	26.8 (80.2)	27.2 (81.0)	26.8 (80.2)	26.5 (79.7)	26.3 (79.3)	26.2 (79.2)	27.3 (81.1)	
Panama	Panama City	28.1 (82.6)	28.1 (82.6)	28.6 (83.5)	28.9 (84.0)	28.3 (82.9)	27.8 (82.0)	27.8 (82.0)	27.8 (82.0)	27.2 (81.0)	27.0 (80.6)	27.2 (81.0)	27.5 (81.5)	28.1 (82.6)	
Puerto Rico	San Juan	25.3 (77.6)	25.5 (77.9)	26.1 (78.9)	26.8 (80.3)	27.7 (81.9)	28.5 (83.3)	28.6 (83.4)	28.7 (83.7)	28.6 (83.5)	28.1 (82.6)	27.0 (80.6)	24.8 (76.7)	27.2 (81.0)	
Saint Pierre and Miquelon	Saint-Pierre	−2.6 (27.3)	−3.2 (26.2)	−1.4 (29.5)	2.0 (35.6)	5.6 (42.1)	9.6 (49.3)	14.1 (57.4)	16.2 (61.2)	13.5 (56.3)	8.9 (48.0)	4.5 (40.1)	0.4 (32.7)	5.7 (42.3)	
United States	Albuquerque	3.0 (37.4)	5.5 (41.9)	9.7 (49.5)	13.8 (56.8)	18.9 (66.1)	24.5 (76.1)	26.1 (78.9)	24.9 (76.9)	21.3 (70.3)	14.7 (58.4)	7.6 (45.7)	2.7 (36.9)	14.4 (57.9)	
United States	Anchorage	−8.4 (16.9)	−5.9 (21.3)	−3.4 (25.8)	3.1 (37.5)	8.9 (48.1)	13.3 (55.9)	15.3 (59.6)	14.2 (57.5)	9.6 (49.3)	2.4 (36.3)	−4.7 (23.6)	−7.0 (19.4)	3.1 (37.6)	
United States	Atlanta	7.1 (44.8)	9.2 (48.5)	13.1 (55.6)	17.3 (63.2)	21.8 (71.2)	25.5 (77.9)	27.2 (80.9)	26.8 (80.2)	23.8 (74.9)	18.2 (64.7)	12.3 (54.2)	8.5 (47.3)	17.6 (63.6)	
United States	Austin	11.2 (52.2)	13.4 (56.1)	17.1 (62.8)	20.9 (69.6)	24.9 (76.8)	28.3 (83.0)	29.9 (85.8)	30.3 (86.5)	27.1 (80.8)	22.0 (71.6)	16.1 (61.0)	12.0 (53.6)	21.1 (70.0)	
United States	Baltimore	1.3 (34.3)	2.6 (36.6)	6.8 (44.3)	12.8 (55.0)	18.0 (64.4)	23.1 (73.5)	25.7 (78.3)	24.6 (76.2)	20.7 (69.2)	14.1 (57.4)	8.3 (46.9)	3.7 (38.6)	13.4 (56.2)	
United States	Boise	0.1 (32.2)	3.1 (37.5)	7.3 (45.2)	10.5 (50.9)	15.5 (59.9)	19.9 (67.8)	25.2 (77.3)	24.3 (75.8)	19.1 (66.3)	11.8 (53.2)	4.6 (40.3)	0.1 (32.1)	11.8 (53.2)	
United States	Boston	−1.2 (29.9)	−0.1 (31.8)	3.5 (38.3)	9.2 (48.6)	14.7 (58.4)	20.0 (68.0)	23.4 (74.1)	22.6 (72.7)	18.7 (65.6)	12.7 (54.8)	7.1 (44.7)	2.1 (35.7)	11.1 (51.9)	
United States	Charlotte	5.6 (42.1)	7.6 (45.7)	11.5 (52.7)	16.2 (61.1)	20.6 (69.0)	24.8 (76.6)	26.7 (80.1)	25.9 (78.6)	22.6 (72.7)	16.6 (61.9)	10.8 (51.4)	7.1 (44.7)	16.3 (61.4)	
United States	Chicago	−3.2 (26.2)	−1.2 (29.9)	4.4 (39.9)	10.5 (50.9)	16.6 (61.9)	22.2 (71.9)	24.8 (76.7)	23.9 (75.0)	19.9 (67.8)	12.9 (55.3)	5.8 (42.4)	−0.3 (31.5)	11.3 (52.4)	
United States	Columbus	−1.3 (29.6)	0.3 (32.5)	5.3 (41.6)	11.8 (53.2)	17.4 (63.3)	22.2 (71.9)	24.1 (75.4)	23.3 (74.0)	19.6 (67.2)	12.9 (55.2)	6.4 (43.6)	1.4 (34.5)	11.9 (53.5)	
United States	Dallas	8.8 (47.8)	11.1 (52.0)	15.3 (59.6)	19.5 (67.1)	24.1 (75.4)	28.5 (83.3)	30.7 (87.3)	30.7 (87.3)	26.7 (80.1)	20.6 (69.1)	14.3 (57.8)	9.7 (49.5)	20.0 (68.0)	
United States	Denver	−0.2 (31.7)	0.4 (32.7)	5.3 (41.6)	8.8 (47.8)	14.1 (57.4)	20.1 (68.2)	23.9 (75.1)	22.7 (72.9)	18.2 (64.8)	10.6 (51.1)	4.1 (39.4)	−0.4 (31.2)	10.7 (51.2)	
United States	Detroit	−3.4 (25.8)	−2.2 (28.0)	2.9 (37.2)	9.4 (48.9)	15.7 (60.3)	21.1 (69.9)	23.4 (74.1)	22.4 (72.3)	18.3 (64.9)	11.7 (53.0)	5.1 (41.2)	−0.4 (31.3)	10.3 (50.6)	
United States	El Paso	8.1 (46.5)	10.8 (51.5)	14.8 (58.7)	19.2 (66.6)	24.1 (75.4)	28.8 (83.9)	29.1 (84.4)	28.3 (82.9)	24.9 (76.9)	19.3 (66.7)	12.5 (54.5)	7.8 (46.1)	19.0 (66.2)	
United States	Fairbanks	−22.4 (−8.3)	−17.7 (0.2)	−11.8 (10.7)	0.9 (33.7)	10.2 (50.3)	16.1 (61.0)	17.2 (62.9)	13.9 (57.0)	7.7 (45.8)	−3.2 (26.2)	−15.5 (4.1)	−20.2 (−4.3)	−2.1 (28.3)	
United States	Fresno	8.1 (46.6)	10.8 (51.5)	13.7 (56.6)	16.7 (62.0)	21.2 (70.1)	25.1 (77.2)	28.3 (83.0)	27.6 (81.7)	24.6 (76.2)	19.0 (66.2)	12.4 (54.3)	8.1 (46.5)	17.9 (64.3)	
United States	Houston	11.5 (52.7)	13.3 (56.0)	16.9 (62.4)	20.7 (69.2)	24.8 (76.6)	27.7 (81.9)	28.9 (84.0)	29.0 (84.2)	26.3 (79.4)	21.7 (71.1)	16.6 (61.9)	12.3 (54.1)	20.8 (69.4)	
United States	Indianapolis	−2.2 (28.1)	0.1 (32.2)	5.7 (42.3)	11.8 (53.2)	17.2 (62.9)	22.3 (72.2)	24.2 (75.5)	23.5 (74.3)	19.5 (67.1)	12.9 (55.2)	6.6 (43.8)	−0.1 (31.8)	11.8 (53.2)	
United States	Jacksonville	11.7 (53.1)	13.6 (56.4)	16.5 (61.7)	19.4 (66.9)	23.4 (74.1)	26.7 (80.0)	27.9 (82.3)	27.6 (81.7)	25.7 (78.2)	21.3 (70.4)	16.8 (62.2)	12.9 (55.2)	20.3 (68.5)	
United States	Kansas City	−1.8 (28.8)	0.8 (33.5)	6.8 (44.2)	12.7 (54.8)	18.1 (64.5)	23.1 (73.5)	25.7 (78.3)	25.0 (77.0)	20.1 (68.1)	13.5 (56.3)	6.4 (43.6)	−0.3 (31.4)	12.5 (54.5)	
United States	Las Vegas	8.8 (47.8)	11.1 (52.0)	15.0 (59.0)	19.1 (66.4)	24.7 (76.5)	29.9 (85.8)	33.2 (91.7)	32.1 (89.8)	27.6 (81.7)	20.4 (68.7)	13.1 (55.6)	8.2 (46.8)	20.3 (68.5)	
United States	Lake Havasu City	12.2 (54.0)	14.6 (58.3)	18.1 (64.5)	22.4 (72.4)	27.9 (82.2)	32.7 (90.9)	36.1 (96.9)	35.5 (95.9)	31.3 (88.3)	24.1 (75.3)	17.0 (62.6)	11.7 (53.0)	23.7 (74.6)	
United States	Los Angeles	14.4 (58.0)	14.9 (58.9)	15.9 (60.6)	17.3 (63.1)	18.8 (65.8)	20.7 (69.2)	22.9 (73.3)	23.5 (74.3)	22.8 (73.1)	20.3 (68.6)	16.9 (62.4)	14.2 (57.6)	18.6 (65.4)	
United States	Louisville	1.1 (34.0)	3.3 (37.9)	8.3 (46.9)	13.9 (57.0)	18.9 (66.1)	23.7 (74.6)	25.7 (78.2)	25.2 (77.3)	21.1 (70.0)	14.8 (58.6)	8.7 (47.7)	2.7 (36.9)	13.9 (57.1)	
United States	Memphis	5.2 (41.3)	7.5 (45.5)	12.2 (54.0)	17.2 (63.0)	22.1 (71.7)	26.4 (79.6)	28.2 (82.7)	27.8 (82.1)	24.0 (75.2)	17.8 (64.1)	11.8 (53.2)	6.4 (43.6)	17.2 (63.0)	
United States	Miami	19.9 (67.9)	21.1 (70.0)	22.4 (72.4)	24.2 (75.6)	26.5 (79.7)	28.1 (82.5)	28.8 (83.9)	28.9 (84.0)	28.2 (82.7)	26.4 (79.6)	23.7 (74.7)	21.2 (70.2)	24.9 (76.9)	
United States	Milwaukee	−5.2 (22.6)	−3.2 (26.3)	1.9 (35.4)	7.8 (46.0)	13.3 (56.0)	19.2 (66.6)	22.3 (72.1)	21.7 (71.0)	17.4 (63.3)	10.9 (51.6)	4.1 (39.3)	−2.9 (26.8)	8.9 (48.1)	
United States	Minneapolis	−9.1 (15.6)	−6.2 (20.8)	0.4 (32.7)	8.6 (47.5)	15.1 (59.1)	20.4 (68.7)	23.2 (73.7)	21.7 (71.1)	16.7 (62.0)	9.4 (48.9)	0.9 (33.7)	−6.8 (19.7)	7.8 (46.1)	
United States	Nashville	3.4 (38.1)	5.7 (42.2)	10.3 (50.5)	15.3 (59.5)	20.0 (68.0)	24.6 (76.2)	26.6 (79.9)	26.2 (79.2)	22.2 (72.0)	16.0 (60.8)	10.2 (50.3)	4.9 (40.9)	15.4 (59.8)	
United States	New Orleans	11.6 (52.9)	13.4 (56.2)	16.8 (62.2)	20.3 (68.6)	24.6 (76.2)	27.2 (81.0)	28.2 (82.8)	28.2 (82.8)	26.2 (79.2)	21.6 (70.8)	16.8 (62.2)	12.9 (55.2)	20.7 (69.2)	
United States	New York City	0.6 (33.0)	2.1 (35.7)	6.1 (42.9)	11.9 (53.4)	17.1 (62.8)	22.1 (71.8)	24.9 (76.9)	24.3 (75.7)	20.2 (68.4)	14.1 (57.3)	8.9 (48.1)	3.3 (37.9)	12.9 (55.3)	
United States	Oklahoma; City	3.6 (38.4)	6.1 (42.9)	10.7 (51.3)	15.6 (60.1)	20.6 (69.0)	25.1 (77.1)	27.8 (82.1)	27.6 (81.6)	22.8 (73.1)	16.5 (61.7)	9.9 (49.9)	4.3 (39.7)	15.9 (60.6)	
United States	Omaha	−4.6 (23.7)	−2.1 (28.3)	4.2 (39.5)	10.9 (51.7)	16.9 (62.5)	22.3 (72.2)	24.8 (76.7)	23.7 (74.6)	18.8 (65.9)	11.8 (53.3)	3.8 (38.9)	−3.3 (26.1)	10.6 (51.1)	
United States	Palm Springs	16.3 (61.3)	18.1 (64.5)	20.7 (69.2)	23.7 (74.6)	26.8 (80.3)	30.7 (87.3)	33.8 (92.8)	33.6 (92.5)	30.5 (86.9)	24.9 (76.8)	19.2 (66.6)	15.7 (60.2)	24.5 (76.1)	
United States	Philadelphia	0.5 (32.9)	2.0 (35.6)	6.4 (43.5)	12.2 (54.0)	17.7 (63.8)	22.9 (73.2)	25.6 (78.1)	24.7 (76.5)	20.6 (69.1)	14.2 (57.5)	8.7 (47.6)	3.0 (37.4)	13.2 (55.8)	
United States	Phoenix	13.6 (56.5)	15.4 (59.8)	18.5 (65.3)	22.7 (72.8)	27.8 (82.1)	32.7 (90.9)	34.9 (94.8)	34.2 (93.6)	31.3 (88.4)	24.8 (76.7)	17.9 (64.2)	13.1 (55.5)	23.9 (75.0)	
United States	Pittsburgh	−1.9 (28.5)	−0.4 (31.3)	4.3 (39.8)	10.6 (51.1)	15.7 (60.2)	20.5 (68.9)	22.7 (72.8)	22.0 (71.6)	17.9 (64.3)	11.6 (52.9)	6.2 (43.1)	0.3 (32.5)	10.8 (51.4)	
United States	Portland (OR)	5.2 (41.4)	6.6 (43.8)	8.9 (48.1)	11.3 (52.3)	14.6 (58.3)	17.6 (63.6)	20.7 (69.2)	20.9 (69.6)	18.1 (64.5)	12.7 (54.9)	8.1 (46.6)	4.7 (40.4)	12.4 (54.4)	
United States	Sacramento	8.1 (46.6)	10.6 (51.1)	12.7 (54.9)	15.0 (59.0)	18.8 (65.8)	22.1 (71.7)	24.2 (75.5)	23.8 (74.9)	22.1 (71.7)	17.9 (64.2)	11.9 (53.5)	8.0 (46.4)	16.3 (61.3)	
United States	Salt Lake; City	−1.3 (29.6)	1.3 (34.3)	6.6 (43.8)	10.4 (50.7)	15.5 (59.9)	21.1 (69.9)	26.1 (78.9)	25.1 (77.2)	19.1 (66.3)	11.8 (53.2)	4.6 (40.2)	−0.8 (30.5)	11.6 (52.9)	
United States	San Antonio	11.0 (51.8)	13.1 (55.6)	16.8 (62.2)	20.8 (69.5)	25.0 (77.0)	28.1 (82.5)	29.3 (84.7)	29.7 (85.4)	26.6 (79.8)	21.8 (71.3)	16.2 (61.2)	11.6 (52.9)	20.8 (69.5)	
United States	San Diego	14.2 (57.6)	14.7 (58.4)	15.5 (59.9)	16.8 (62.3)	18.1 (64.5)	19.4 (67.0)	21.4 (70.5)	22.2 (72.0)	21.7 (71.0)	19.6 (67.2)	16.6 (61.8)	13.9 (57.1)	17.8 (64.1)	
United States	San; Francisco	11.2 (52.1)	12.6 (54.7)	13.3 (56.0)	13.9 (57.1)	14.7 (58.5)	15.8 (60.5)	16.3 (61.3)	16.9 (62.5)	17.5 (63.5)	16.8 (62.3)	14.1 (57.4)	11.4 (52.5)	14.6 (58.2)	
United States	San Jose	10.8 (51.5)	12.5 (54.5)	13.8 (56.9)	15.2 (59.3)	17.8 (64.0)	20.2 (68.3)	21.6 (70.9)	21.8 (71.2)	20.7 (69.2)	17.9 (64.3)	13.9 (57.0)	10.6 (51.1)	16.4 (61.5)	
United States	Seattle	5.4 (41.8)	6.2 (43.2)	7.9 (46.3)	10.1 (50.2)	13.2 (55.8)	15.9 (60.7)	18.6 (65.5)	18.8 (65.9)	16.2 (61.1)	11.4 (52.6)	7.4 (45.3)	4.7 (40.4)	11.3 (52.4)	
United States	St. Louis	−0.1 (31.8)	2.4 (36.3)	7.9 (46.3)	14.1 (57.3)	19.3 (66.8)	24.4 (75.9)	26.7 (80.0)	25.9 (78.6)	21.3 (70.4)	14.8 (58.7)	8.2 (46.8)	1.6 (34.8)	13.9 (57.0)	
United States	Tampa	15.9 (60.6)	17.3 (63.2)	19.5 (67.1)	22.1 (71.7)	25.7 (78.2)	27.8 (82.0)	28.2 (82.8)	28.3 (83.0)	27.5 (81.5)	24.4 (76.0)	20.6 (69.0)	17.2 (63.0)	22.9 (73.2)	
United States	Tucson	11.6 (52.9)	13.1 (55.6)	15.8 (60.5)	19.7 (67.4)	24.6 (76.3)	29.6 (85.2)	30.8 (87.4)	29.8 (85.7)	27.7 (81.9)	21.9 (71.4)	15.6 (60.1)	11.3 (52.3)	20.9 (69.7)	
United States	Virginia; Beach	4.9 (40.8)	6.1 (43.0)	9.8 (49.7)	14.8 (58.6)	19.4 (67.0)	24.3 (75.7)	26.7 (80.0)	25.7 (78.3)	22.6 (72.6)	16.9 (62.4)	11.8 (53.2)	6.9 (44.5)	15.8 (60.5)	
United States	Washington, D.C.	2.3 (36.1)	3.9 (39.1)	8.3 (46.9)	13.8 (56.9)	18.9 (66.1)	24.1 (75.3)	26.6 (79.8)	25.7 (78.2)	21.7 (71.1)	15.3 (59.6)	9.8 (49.6)	4.3 (39.8)	14.6 (58.2)	
United States	Wichita	0.1 (32.2)	2.9 (37.2)	8.1 (46.5)	13.4 (56.1)	18.9 (66.0)	24.3 (75.8)	27.3 (81.1)	26.7 (80.0)	21.7 (71.0)	14.6 (58.3)	7.4 (45.4)	0.9 (33.7)	13.9 (57.0)	

== Oceania ==
Average temperatures for selected cities in Oceania °C (°F)
Country	City	Jan	Feb	Mar	Apr	May	Jun	Jul	Aug	Sep	Oct	Nov	Dec	Year	Ref.
Australia	Adelaide	23.8 (74.8)	23.6 (74.5)	21.0 (69.8)	17.9 (64.2)	14.6 (58.3)	12.3 (54.1)	11.7 (53.1)	12.4 (54.3)	14.6 (58.3)	17.1 (62.8)	19.8 (67.6)	21.7 (71.1)	17.5 (63.5)	
Australia	Alice Springs	29.7 (85.5)	28.5 (83.3)	25.7 (78.3)	21.1 (70.0)	15.8 (60.4)	12.4 (54.3)	12.3 (54.1)	14.7 (58.5)	20.0 (68.0)	23.4 (74.1)	26.4 (79.5)	28.2 (82.8)	21.5 (70.7)	
Australia	Brisbane	25.8 (78.4)	25.7 (78.3)	24.5 (76.1)	22.3 (72.1)	19.1 (66.4)	16.8 (62.2)	16.0 (60.8)	17.0 (62.6)	19.7 (67.5)	21.7 (71.1)	23.5 (74.3)	24.8 (76.6)	21.4 (70.5)	
Australia	Burnie	17.0 (62.6)	17.3 (63.1)	16.1 (61.0)	14.0 (57.2)	11.9 (53.4)	10.2 (50.4)	9.4 (48.9)	9.7 (49.5)	10.6 (51.1)	12.0 (53.6)	13.9 (57.0)	15.4 (59.7)	13.1 (55.6)	
Australia	Cairns	27.9 (82.2)	27.8 (82.0)	27.2 (81.0)	25.8 (78.4)	24.1 (75.4)	22.6 (72.7)	21.7 (71.1)	22.2 (72.0)	23.8 (74.8)	25.4 (77.7)	26.8 (80.2)	27.8 (82.0)	25.3 (77.5)	
Australia	Canberra	21.4 (70.5)	20.8 (69.4)	17.9 (64.2)	13.7 (56.7)	10.0 (50.0)	7.3 (45.1)	6.2 (43.2)	7.5 (45.5)	10.4 (50.7)	13.4 (56.1)	16.5 (61.7)	19.3 (66.7)	13.7 (56.7)	
Australia	Dampier	31.0 (87.8)	31.3 (88.3)	30.9 (87.6)	28.6 (83.5)	24.1 (75.4)	20.9 (69.6)	19.8 (67.6)	21.2 (70.2)	23.7 (74.7)	26.2 (79.2)	28.3 (82.9)	30.2 (86.4)	26.4 (79.5)	
Australia	Darwin	28.5 (83.3)	28.4 (83.1)	28.6 (83.5)	28.6 (83.5)	27.3 (81.1)	25.5 (77.9)	25.2 (77.4)	25.8 (78.4)	28.0 (82.4)	29.3 (84.7)	29.5 (85.1)	29.2 (84.6)	27.8 (82.0)	
Australia	Hobart	17.9 (64.2)	17.5 (63.5)	16.2 (61.2)	13.7 (56.7)	11.5 (52.7)	9.1 (48.4)	8.9 (48.0)	9.7 (49.5)	11.3 (52.3)	13.0 (55.4)	14.6 (58.3)	16.3 (61.3)	13.3 (55.9)	
Australia	Launceston	18.7 (65.7)	18.6 (65.5)	16.5 (61.7)	13.2 (55.8)	10.4 (50.7)	8.1 (46.6)	7.7 (45.9)	8.7 (47.7)	10.5 (50.9)	12.6 (54.7)	14.8 (58.6)	16.8 (62.2)	13.1 (55.6)	
Australia	Melbourne	20.6 (69.1)	20.6 (69.1)	18.6 (65.5)	15.4 (59.7)	12.5 (54.5)	10.2 (50.4)	9.6 (49.3)	10.4 (50.7)	12.1 (53.8)	14.3 (57.7)	16.6 (61.9)	18.5 (65.3)	14.9 (58.8)	
Australia	Perth	24.5 (76.1)	24.9 (76.8)	23.1 (73.6)	19.7 (67.5)	16.5 (61.7)	14.0 (57.2)	13.0 (55.4)	13.5 (56.3)	14.8 (58.6)	17.3 (63.1)	20.3 (68.5)	22.7 (72.9)	18.7 (65.7)	
Australia	Sydney	23.5 (74.3)	23.4 (74.1)	22.1 (71.8)	19.5 (67.1)	16.6 (61.9)	14.2 (57.6)	13.4 (56.1)	14.5 (58.1)	17.0 (62.6)	18.9 (66.0)	20.4 (68.7)	22.1 (71.8)	18.8 (65.8)	
Chile	Hanga Roa	23.3 (73.9)	23.7 (74.7)	23.1 (73.6)	21.9 (71.4)	20.1 (68.2)	18.9 (66.0)	18.0 (64.4)	17.9 (64.2)	18.3 (64.9)	19.0 (66.2)	20.4 (68.7)	21.8 (71.2)	20.5 (68.9)	
Fiji	Suva	27.4 (81.3)	27.6 (81.7)	26.4 (79.5)	26.6 (79.9)	25.4 (77.7)	24.6 (76.3)	23.8 (74.8)	23.7 (74.7)	24.1 (75.4)	25.1 (77.2)	26.1 (79.0)	26.9 (80.4)	25.6 (78.1)	
New Zealand	Alexandra	18.0 (64.4)	17.4 (63.3)	14.9 (58.8)	10.9 (51.6)	7.6 (45.7)	3.6 (38.5)	2.9 (37.2)	6.0 (42.8)	9.3 (48.7)	11.7 (53.1)	14.0 (57.2)	16.3 (61.3)	11.0 (51.8)	
New Zealand	Auckland	19.1 (66.4)	19.7 (67.5)	18.4 (65.1)	16.1 (61.0)	14.0 (57.2)	11.8 (53.2)	10.9 (51.6)	11.3 (52.3)	12.7 (54.9)	14.2 (57.6)	15.7 (60.3)	17.8 (64.0)	15.2 (59.4)	
New Zealand	Christchurch	17.5 (63.5)	17.2 (63.0)	15.5 (59.9)	12.7 (54.9)	9.8 (49.6)	7.1 (44.8)	6.6 (43.9)	7.9 (46.2)	10.3 (50.5)	12.2 (54.0)	14.1 (57.4)	16.1 (61.0)	12.2 (54.0)	
New Zealand	Dunedin	15.3 (59.5)	15.0 (59.0)	13.7 (56.7)	11.7 (53.1)	9.3 (48.7)	7.3 (45.1)	6.6 (43.9)	7.7 (45.9)	9.5 (49.1)	10.9 (51.6)	12.4 (54.3)	13.9 (57.0)	11.1 (52.0)	
New Zealand	Hamilton	18.4 (65.1)	18.8 (65.8)	17.1 (62.8)	14.5 (58.1)	11.9 (53.4)	9.5 (49.1)	8.9 (48.0)	9.8 (49.6)	11.6 (52.9)	13.2 (55.8)	14.9 (58.8)	16.9 (62.4)	13.8 (56.8)	
New Zealand	Lake Tekapo	15.2 (59.4)	14.8 (58.6)	12.4 (54.3)	9.2 (48.6)	5.9 (42.6)	2.6 (36.7)	1.4 (34.5)	3.6 (38.5)	6.5 (43.7)	8.8 (47.8)	11.1 (52.0)	13.2 (55.8)	8.7 (47.7)	
New Zealand	Napier	19.5 (67.1)	19.4 (66.9)	17.7 (63.9)	15.0 (59.0)	12.4 (54.3)	10.0 (50.0)	9.4 (48.9)	10.3 (50.5)	12.3 (54.1)	14.3 (57.7)	16.1 (61.0)	18.4 (65.1)	14.6 (58.3)	
New Zealand	Palmerston North	17.8 (64.0)	18.3 (64.9)	16.4 (61.5)	13.6 (56.5)	11.4 (52.5)	9.1 (48.4)	8.6 (47.5)	9.2 (48.6)	11.0 (51.8)	12.4 (54.3)	13.8 (56.8)	16.2 (61.2)	13.2 (55.8)	
New Zealand	Tauranga	19.4 (66.9)	19.6 (67.3)	18.0 (64.4)	15.5 (59.9)	13.2 (55.8)	10.8 (51.4)	10.2 (50.4)	10.7 (51.3)	12.3 (54.1)	13.9 (57.0)	15.8 (60.4)	18.0 (64.4)	14.8 (58.6)	
New Zealand	Wellington	16.9 (62.4)	17.2 (63.0)	15.8 (60.4)	13.7 (56.7)	11.7 (53.1)	9.7 (49.5)	8.9 (48.0)	9.4 (48.9)	10.8 (51.4)	12.0 (53.6)	13.5 (56.3)	15.4 (59.7)	12.9 (55.2)	
Papua New Guinea	Port Moresby	27.4 (81.3)	27.3 (81.1)	27.1 (80.8)	27.0 (80.6)	26.9 (80.4)	26.1 (79.0)	25.7 (78.3)	26.1 (79.0)	26.5 (79.7)	27.5 (81.5)	27.6 (81.7)	27.8 (82.0)	26.9 (80.4)	
Solomon Islands	Honiara	26.7 (80.1)	26.6 (79.9)	26.6 (79.9)	26.5 (79.7)	26.6 (79.9)	26.4 (79.5)	26.1 (79.0)	26.2 (79.2)	26.5 (79.7)	26.5 (79.7)	26.7 (80.1)	26.8 (80.2)	26.5 (79.7)	
United States	Honolulu	22.9 (73.2)	22.9 (73.2)	23.7 (74.7)	24.6 (76.3)	25.6 (78.1)	26.8 (80.2)	27.4 (81.3)	27.8 (82.0)	27.6 (81.7)	26.8 (80.2)	25.4 (77.7)	23.8 (74.8)	25.4 (77.7)	
Vanuatu	Port Vila	26.4 (79.5)	26.5 (79.7)	26.3 (79.3)	25.3 (77.5)	24.1 (75.4)	23.0 (73.4)	22.1 (71.8)	22.0 (71.6)	22.7 (72.9)	23.4 (74.1)	24.6 (76.3)	25.7 (78.3)	24.3 (75.7)	

== South America ==
Average temperatures for selected cities in South America °C (°F)
Country	City	Jan	Feb	Mar	Apr	May	Jun	Jul	Aug	Sep	Oct	Nov	Dec	Year	Ref.
Argentina	Bahía Blanca	23.6 (74.5)	22.1 (71.8)	19.4 (66.9)	14.9 (58.8)	11.1 (52.0)	8.1 (46.6)	7.5 (45.5)	9.4 (48.9)	11.6 (52.9)	15.1 (59.2)	18.7 (65.7)	22.0 (71.6)	15.3 (59.5)	
Argentina	Bariloche	15.0 (59.0)	14.8 (58.6)	11.9 (53.4)	7.9 (46.2)	4.9 (40.8)	2.9 (37.2)	2.1 (35.8)	3.0 (37.4)	5.1 (41.2)	8.0 (46.4)	10.8 (51.4)	13.5 (56.3)	8.3 (46.9)	
Argentina	Buenos Aires	24.9 (76.8)	23.6 (74.5)	21.9 (71.4)	17.9 (64.2)	14.5 (58.1)	11.7 (53.1)	11.0 (51.8)	12.8 (55.0)	14.6 (58.3)	17.9 (64.2)	20.7 (69.3)	23.3 (73.9)	17.9 (64.2)	
Argentina	Comodoro Rivadavia	19.7 (67.5)	18.8 (65.8)	16.3 (61.3)	13.1 (55.6)	9.6 (49.3)	6.9 (44.4)	6.6 (43.9)	7.9 (46.2)	10.1 (50.2)	13.0 (55.4)	15.9 (60.6)	18.2 (64.8)	13.0 (55.4)	
Argentina	Córdoba	24.9 (76.8)	23.1 (73.6)	21.7 (71.1)	18.0 (64.4)	14.5 (58.1)	11.4 (52.5)	10.8 (51.4)	13.3 (55.9)	15.7 (60.3)	19.5 (67.1)	21.8 (71.2)	23.7 (74.7)	18.2 (64.8)	
Argentina	Mar del Plata	20.4 (68.7)	19.8 (67.6)	18.2 (64.8)	14.5 (58.1)	11.2 (52.2)	8.4 (47.1)	7.5 (45.5)	8.8 (47.8)	10.4 (50.7)	13.3 (55.9)	15.9 (60.6)	18.5 (65.3)	13.9 (57.0)	
Argentina	Mendoza	25.5 (77.9)	24.0 (75.2)	21.3 (70.3)	16.2 (61.2)	11.8 (53.2)	8.4 (47.1)	7.9 (46.2)	10.6 (51.1)	13.9 (57.0)	18.8 (65.8)	22.2 (72.0)	24.9 (76.8)	17.1 (62.8)	
Argentina	Neuquén	23.7 (74.7)	22.3 (72.1)	18.9 (66.0)	13.4 (56.1)	9.2 (48.6)	6.6 (43.9)	5.8 (42.4)	8.1 (46.6)	11.4 (52.5)	15.6 (60.1)	19.4 (66.9)	22.4 (72.3)	14.7 (58.5)	
Argentina	Resistencia	26.8 (80.2)	25.9 (78.6)	24.6 (76.3)	21.2 (70.2)	17.6 (63.7)	15.4 (59.7)	14.8 (58.6)	16.7 (62.1)	18.5 (65.3)	21.8 (71.2)	23.6 (74.5)	25.8 (78.4)	21.1 (70.0)	
Argentina	Río Gallegos	13.8 (56.8)	13.2 (55.8)	10.8 (51.4)	7.6 (45.7)	4.2 (39.6)	1.4 (34.5)	1.2 (34.2)	3.1 (37.6)	5.7 (42.3)	8.4 (47.1)	11.1 (52.0)	12.8 (55.0)	7.8 (46.0)	
Argentina	Rosario	24.6 (76.3)	23.2 (73.8)	21.4 (70.5)	17.3 (63.1)	13.8 (56.8)	10.7 (51.3)	10.0 (50.0)	12.1 (53.8)	14.5 (58.1)	18.1 (64.6)	21.0 (69.8)	23.4 (74.1)	17.5 (63.5)	
Argentina	Salta	21.4 (70.5)	20.3 (68.5)	19.5 (67.1)	16.6 (61.9)	13.1 (55.6)	10.6 (51.1)	10.1 (50.2)	12.7 (54.9)	15.1 (59.2)	19.1 (66.4)	20.5 (68.9)	21.5 (70.7)	16.7 (62.1)	
Argentina	San Juan	27.1 (80.8)	25.5 (77.9)	22.8 (73.0)	17.2 (63.0)	12.2 (54.0)	8.3 (46.9)	7.7 (45.9)	10.6 (51.1)	14.4 (57.9)	19.8 (67.6)	23.4 (74.1)	26.3 (79.3)	17.9 (64.2)	
Argentina	San Miguel de Tucumán	25.2 (77.4)	24.0 (75.2)	22.6 (72.7)	19.2 (66.6)	15.7 (60.3)	12.7 (54.9)	12.2 (54.0)	14.9 (58.8)	17.8 (64.0)	21.8 (71.2)	23.4 (74.1)	24.9 (76.8)	19.5 (67.1)	
Argentina	Santiago del Estero	26.7 (80.1)	25.5 (77.9)	23.8 (74.8)	19.8 (67.6)	16.1 (61.0)	12.7 (54.9)	12.2 (54.0)	15.3 (59.5)	18.5 (65.3)	22.7 (72.9)	24.8 (76.6)	26.5 (79.7)	20.4 (68.7)	
Argentina	Ushuaia	9.5 (49.1)	9.4 (48.9)	8.4 (47.1)	6.2 (43.2)	4.3 (39.7)	2.5 (36.5)	2.3 (36.1)	2.9 (37.2)	4.3 (39.7)	6.2 (43.2)	7.4 (45.3)	8.6 (47.5)	6.0 (42.8)	
Argentina	Viedma	22.1 (71.8)	20.8 (69.4)	18.3 (64.9)	13.8 (56.8)	9.9 (49.8)	7.2 (45.0)	6.6 (43.9)	8.2 (46.8)	10.5 (50.9)	14.3 (57.7)	17.7 (63.9)	20.6 (69.1)	14.2 (57.6)	
Bolivia	La Paz	9.3 (48.7)	9.0 (48.2)	8.9 (48.0)	8.8 (47.8)	8.2 (46.8)	7.3 (45.1)	6.8 (44.2)	8.2 (46.8)	8.7 (47.7)	10.0 (50.0)	10.5 (50.9)	9.7 (49.5)	8.8 (47.8)	
Bolivia	Santa Cruz de la Sierra	26.8 (80.2)	26.6 (79.9)	26.2 (79.2)	24.7 (76.5)	22.8 (73.0)	20.4 (68.7)	21.1 (70.0)	23.0 (73.4)	25.2 (77.4)	26.4 (79.5)	27.1 (80.8)	27.0 (80.6)	24.8 (76.6)	
Bolivia	Sucre	16.2 (61.2)	15.7 (60.3)	15.8 (60.4)	15.5 (59.9)	14.9 (58.8)	13.8 (56.8)	13.9 (57.0)	14.9 (58.8)	16.2 (61.2)	16.9 (62.4)	17.3 (63.1)	16.7 (62.1)	15.6 (60.1)	
Brazil	Belém	25.6 (78.1)	25.4 (77.7)	25.5 (77.9)	25.6 (78.1)	25.8 (78.4)	26.0 (78.8)	25.7 (78.3)	26.0 (78.8)	26.0 (78.8)	26.4 (79.5)	26.5 (79.7)	26.2 (79.2)	25.9 (78.6)	
Brazil	Belo Horizonte	22.8 (73.0)	23.0 (73.4)	22.9 (73.2)	21.7 (71.1)	19.6 (67.3)	18.5 (65.3)	18.0 (64.4)	19.7 (67.5)	21.1 (70.0)	21.7 (71.1)	22.2 (72.0)	22.2 (72.0)	21.1 (70.0)	
Brazil	Brasília	21.2 (70.2)	21.3 (70.3)	21.5 (70.7)	20.9 (69.6)	19.6 (67.3)	18.5 (65.3)	18.3 (64.9)	20.3 (68.5)	21.7 (71.1)	21.6 (70.9)	21.1 (70.0)	21.0 (69.8)	20.6 (69.1)	
Brazil	Campos do Jordão	17.3 (63.1)	17.5 (63.5)	16.7 (62.1)	14.7 (58.5)	11.9 (53.4)	10.1 (50.2)	9.5 (49.1)	11.3 (52.3)	13.4 (56.1)	14.9 (58.8)	15.9 (60.6)	16.6 (61.9)	14.2 (57.6)	
Brazil	Curitiba	20.4 (68.7)	20.6 (69.1)	19.6 (67.3)	17.2 (63.0)	14.5 (58.1)	13.1 (55.6)	12.9 (55.2)	14.1 (57.4)	15.0 (59.0)	16.5 (61.7)	18.2 (64.8)	19.3 (66.7)	16.8 (62.2)	
Brazil	Florianópolis	24.9 (76.8)	25.1 (77.2)	24.5 (76.1)	22.2 (72.0)	19.2 (66.6)	17.2 (63.0)	16.4 (61.5)	17.0 (62.6)	18.3 (64.9)	20.3 (68.5)	22.2 (72.0)	24.0 (75.2)	20.9 (69.6)	
Brazil	Fortaleza	27.1 (80.8)	26.9 (80.4)	26.4 (79.5)	26.2 (79.2)	26.2 (79.2)	25.8 (78.4)	25.6 (78.1)	26.0 (78.8)	26.4 (79.5)	26.9 (80.4)	27.2 (81.0)	27.3 (81.1)	26.6 (79.9)	
Brazil	Goiânia	23.8 (74.8)	23.8 (74.8)	24.0 (75.2)	23.6 (74.5)	22.2 (72.0)	20.9 (69.6)	20.9 (69.6)	23.0 (73.4)	24.5 (76.1)	24.6 (76.3)	24.1 (75.4)	23.5 (74.3)	23.2 (73.8)	
Brazil	Manaus	26.1 (79.0)	25.9 (78.6)	26.0 (78.8)	26.2 (79.2)	26.2 (79.2)	26.4 (79.5)	26.5 (79.7)	27.3 (81.1)	27.7 (81.9)	27.7 (81.9)	27.2 (81.0)	26.6 (79.9)	26.7 (80.1)	
Brazil	Porto Alegre	24.6 (76.3)	24.6 (76.3)	23.1 (73.6)	19.9 (67.8)	16.9 (62.4)	14.3 (57.7)	14.4 (57.9)	15.2 (59.4)	16.8 (62.2)	19.1 (66.4)	21.2 (70.2)	23.3 (73.9)	19.5 (67.1)	
Brazil	Recife	26.5 (79.7)	26.5 (79.7)	26.4 (79.5)	25.9 (78.6)	25.2 (77.4)	24.5 (76.1)	23.9 (75.0)	23.9 (75.0)	24.6 (76.3)	25.5 (77.9)	26.1 (79.0)	26.4 (79.5)	25.5 (77.9)	
Brazil	Rio de Janeiro	26.3 (79.3)	26.6 (79.9)	26.0 (78.8)	24.4 (75.9)	22.8 (73.0)	21.8 (71.2)	21.3 (70.3)	21.8 (71.2)	22.2 (72.0)	22.9 (73.2)	24.0 (75.2)	25.3 (77.5)	23.8 (74.8)	
Brazil	Salvador	26.4 (79.5)	26.5 (79.7)	26.6 (79.9)	26.2 (79.2)	25.2 (77.4)	24.3 (75.7)	23.7 (74.7)	23.6 (74.5)	24.3 (75.7)	25.1 (77.2)	25.5 (77.9)	25.9 (78.6)	25.3 (77.5)	
Brazil	São Joaquim	16.8 (62.2)	17.1 (62.8)	15.9 (60.6)	13.2 (55.8)	11.4 (52.5)	9.7 (49.5)	9.8 (49.6)	10.7 (51.3)	12.0 (53.6)	12.8 (55.0)	14.4 (57.9)	16.0 (60.8)	13.3 (55.9)	
Brazil	São Paulo	22.1 (71.8)	22.4 (72.3)	21.8 (71.2)	19.7 (67.5)	17.4 (63.3)	16.3 (61.3)	15.8 (60.4)	17.1 (62.8)	17.9 (64.2)	19.0 (66.2)	20.2 (68.4)	21.1 (70.0)	19.2 (66.6)	
Brazil	Vitória	26.9 (80.4)	27.4 (81.3)	27.1 (80.8)	25.9 (78.6)	24 (75)	22.8 (73.0)	22.4 (72.3)	22.6 (72.7)	23.2 (73.8)	24.3 (75.7)	24.9 (76.8)	26 (79)	24.8 (76.6)	
Chile	Antofagasta	20.2 (68.4)	20.0 (68.0)	19.1 (66.4)	17.1 (62.8)	15.5 (59.9)	14.2 (57.6)	13.7 (56.7)	14.0 (57.2)	14.7 (58.5)	15.8 (60.4)	17.3 (63.1)	18.9 (66.0)	16.7 (62.1)	
Chile	Concepción	16.5 (61.7)	15.9 (60.6)	14.5 (58.1)	12.3 (54.1)	10.7 (51.3)	9.5 (49.1)	8.8 (47.8)	9.3 (48.7)	10.2 (50.4)	11.9 (53.4)	13.8 (56.8)	15.6 (60.1)	12.4 (54.3)	
Chile	La Serena	17.1 (62.8)	16.9 (62.4)	15.6 (60.1)	13.7 (56.7)	12.3 (54.1)	10.9 (51.6)	10.7 (51.3)	10.9 (51.6)	11.6 (52.9)	12.9 (55.2)	14.6 (58.3)	16.1 (61.0)	13.6 (56.5)	
Chile	Puerto Montt	17.3 (63.1)	19.9 (67.8)	14.5 (58.1)	10.5 (50.9)	8.0 (46.4)	4.9 (40.8)	1.5 (34.7)	3.0 (37.4)	8.2 (46.8)	9.7 (49.5)	13.5 (56.3)	15.3 (59.5)	10.5 (50.9)	
Chile	Punta Arenas	10.8 (51.4)	10.3 (50.5)	8.5 (47.3)	6.2 (43.2)	3.7 (38.7)	1.5 (34.7)	1.4 (34.5)	2.3 (36.1)	4.2 (39.6)	6.4 (43.5)	8.4 (47.1)	9.9 (49.8)	6.1 (43.0)	
Chile	Santiago	21.2 (70.2)	20.3 (68.5)	18.2 (64.8)	14.4 (57.9)	10.9 (51.6)	9.0 (48.2)	8.2 (46.8)	9.8 (49.6)	12.0 (53.6)	15.0 (59.0)	17.7 (63.9)	20.1 (68.2)	14.7 (58.5)	
Colombia	Bogotá	14.3 (57.7)	14.5 (58.1)	14.9 (58.8)	14.9 (58.8)	15.0 (59.0)	14.5 (58.1)	14.6 (58.3)	14.1 (57.4)	14.3 (57.7)	14.3 (57.7)	14.4 (57.9)	14.6 (58.3)	14.4 (57.9)	
Colombia	Barranquilla	26.5 (79.7)	26.7 (80.1)	27.0 (80.6)	27.5 (81.5)	28.1 (82.6)	28.1 (82.6)	27.9 (82.2)	27.9 (82.2)	27.6 (81.7)	27.2 (81.0)	27.4 (81.3)	26.9 (80.4)	27.4 (81.3)	
Colombia	Cali	23.9 (75.0)	23.8 (74.8)	24.1 (75.4)	24.0 (75.2)	24.1 (75.4)	23.7 (74.7)	23.8 (74.8)	23.9 (75.0)	24.1 (75.4)	24.1 (75.4)	24.0 (75.2)	23.8 (74.8)	23.9 (75.0)	
Colombia	Medellín	22.4 (72.3)	22.7 (72.9)	22.7 (72.9)	22.4 (72.3)	22.6 (72.7)	22.9 (73.2)	23.1 (73.6)	23.1 (73.6)	22.4 (72.3)	21.8 (71.2)	21.8 (71.2)	21.9 (71.4)	22.5 (72.5)	
Colombia	Valledupar	30.4 (86.7)	30.5 (86.9)	30.3 (86.5)	30.2 (86.4)	29.7 (85.5)	29.8 (85.6)	29.9 (85.8)	29.8 (85.6)	29.3 (84.7)	28.8 (83.8)	29.0 (84.2)	29.7 (85.5)	29.8 (85.6)	
Ecuador	Guayaquil	27.1 (80.8)	27.3 (81.1)	28.0 (82.4)	27.8 (82.0)	26.9 (80.4)	25.7 (78.3)	25.0 (77.0)	25.2 (77.4)	25.5 (77.9)	25.6 (78.1)	26.2 (79.2)	27.1 (80.8)	26.5 (79.7)	
Ecuador	Quito	14.2 (57.6)	14.0 (57.2)	14.3 (57.7)	14.3 (57.7)	14.5 (58.1)	14.5 (58.1)	14.6 (58.3)	15.0 (59.0)	14.8 (58.6)	14.3 (57.7)	14.3 (57.7)	14.4 (57.9)	14.4 (57.9)	
Falkland Islands	Stanley	9.5 (49.1)	8.9 (48.0)	8.1 (46.6)	6.1 (43.0)	3.9 (39.0)	2.2 (36.0)	1.9 (35.4)	2.2 (36.0)	3.9 (39.0)	5.3 (41.5)	7.0 (44.6)	8.1 (46.6)	5.6 (42.1)	
French Guiana	Cayenne	26.2 (79.2)	26.3 (79.3)	26.5 (79.7)	26.8 (80.2)	26.7 (80.1)	26.6 (79.9)	26.6 (79.9)	27.0 (80.6)	27.2 (81.0)	27.3 (81.1)	27.0 (80.6)	26.6 (79.9)	26.7 (80.1)	
Guyana	Georgetown	26.1 (79.0)	26.4 (79.5)	26.7 (80.1)	27.0 (80.6)	26.8 (80.2)	26.5 (79.7)	26.6 (79.9)	27.0 (80.6)	27.5 (81.5)	27.6 (81.7)	27.2 (81.0)	26.4 (79.5)	26.8 (80.2)	
Paraguay	Asunción	27.5 (81.5)	26.9 (80.4)	25.9 (78.6)	22.8 (73.0)	19.8 (67.6)	17.6 (63.7)	17.9 (64.2)	18.6 (65.5)	20.5 (68.9)	23.2 (73.8)	24.9 (76.8)	26.5 (79.7)	22.7 (72.9)	
Peru	Cusco	12.9 (55.2)	12.7 (54.9)	12.8 (55.0)	12.7 (54.9)	12.0 (53.6)	11.4 (52.5)	10.8 (51.4)	11.5 (52.7)	12.7 (54.9)	13.6 (56.5)	13.6 (56.5)	13.2 (55.8)	12.5 (54.5)	
Peru	Lima	22.1 (71.8)	22.7 (72.9)	22.2 (72.0)	20.6 (69.1)	18.8 (65.8)	17.5 (63.5)	16.7 (62.1)	16.2 (61.2)	16.4 (61.5)	17.3 (63.1)	18.7 (65.7)	20.7 (69.3)	19.2 (66.6)	
Peru	Piura	26.8 (80.2)	27.8 (82.0)	27.8 (82.0)	26.6 (79.9)	24.5 (76.1)	22.9 (73.2)	21.8 (71.2)	21.9 (71.4)	22.3 (72.1)	22.9 (73.2)	23.6 (74.5)	25.2 (77.4)	24.5 (76.1)	
Suriname	Paramaribo	26.0 (78.8)	26.0 (78.8)	26.2 (79.2)	26.7 (80.1)	26.5 (79.7)	26.5 (79.7)	26.7 (80.1)	27.4 (81.3)	27.8 (82.0)	27.9 (82.2)	27.3 (81.1)	26.4 (79.5)	26.8 (80.2)	
Uruguay	Montevideo	23.0 (73.4)	22.5 (72.5)	20.6 (69.1)	17.2 (63.0)	14.0 (57.2)	11.1 (52.0)	10.9 (51.6)	11.7 (53.1)	13.4 (56.1)	16.0 (60.8)	18.6 (65.5)	21.3 (70.3)	16.7 (62.1)	
Venezuela	Caracas	20.2 (68.4)	20.8 (69.4)	21.7 (71.1)	22.7 (72.9)	23.2 (73.8)	22.6 (72.7)	22.2 (72.0)	22.3 (72.1)	22.7 (72.9)	22.4 (72.3)	22.0 (71.6)	20.7 (69.3)	22.0 (71.6)	
Venezuela	Maracaibo	27.7 (81.9)	28.0 (82.4)	28.6 (83.5)	29.0 (84.2)	29.1 (84.4)	29.3 (84.7)	29.5 (85.1)	29.6 (85.3)	29.1 (84.4)	28.3 (82.9)	28.3 (82.9)	27.9 (82.2)	28.7 (83.7)	

== See also ==
- List of cities by sunshine duration
- List of cities by average precipitation
- List of weather records
