= Climate of Greece =

Köppen climate classification for Greece (Beck et al. 2023)

The climate in Greece is predominantly Mediterranean. However, due to the country's complex geography, Greece has a wide range of micro-climates and local variations. The Greek mainland is extremely mountainous, making Greece one of the most mountainous countries in Europe. According to the Köppen climate classification Greece has 11 climates, the most in Europe for its size.

To the west of the Pindus mountain range, the climate is generally wetter and has some maritime features. The east of the Pindus mountain range is generally drier and windier in summer. The highest peak is Mount Olympus, 2,918 metres (9,573 ft). The northern areas of Greece have a transitional climate between the continental, the Mediterranean and the humid subtropical climate while there are marginal mountainous areas with an alpine climate. Semi-arid climates are the second most common in Greece.

Average annual temperatures in Greece range from around +4 °C (39 °F) in Kaimaktsalan up to +22 °C (72 °F) in Lindos and Tris Ekklisies. The lowest average annual precipitation is recorded in Xerokampos with 219 mm while the highest is found in Theodoriana with 2529 mm. The highest temperature ever recorded was 48.0 °C (118.4 °F) in Tatoi and Elefsina while the lowest was −27.8 °C (−18.0 °F) in Ptolemaida (a -35.3 °C was recorded in a sinkhole in Kechroti). Hardiness zones in Greece vary from 11a to 6a (in sinkholes).

== Mediterranean climate ==
The climate of Greece can be divided into the following Mediterranean climate (Köppen climate classification: Cs) subtypes:

=== "True" Mediterranean ===
According to the Climate Atlas of Greece which was published by the Hellenic National Meteorological Service (H.N.M.S) the Mediterranean climate (Köppen climate classification: Csa) is the predominant climate found in Greece. This climate occurs in the North Aegean islands, some of the Cyclades and most of the Dodecanese, Evia, some low-lying areas of Attica, the Ionian Islands and most of the western coast of the country, the eastern and southern low-lying Peloponnese areas, and the low-lying areas of Crete. During the summer, the weather is most frequently sunny and dry, and any precipitation falls in the form of showers or thunderstorms from cumuliform clouds. The air is usually hot during the day and pleasantly warm at night, but there are some very windy days, especially in the Cyclades islands and around them. Heatwaves may occur, but they are usually quite mild at the coastal areas, where temperatures are moderated by the relatively cooler sea and the sea breeze. Winters are wet and any snow that falls does not last long, especially in the south-facing slopes. Rain in winter is often persistent: The west areas of this climate zone receive a relatively higher amount of precipitation. Warm-summer Mediterranean climate (Csb) exists in roughly the same areas but in higher elevations (>1,000 m.), such as mount Parnitha in Attica.

Climate data for Downtown Athens (1991–2020), Extremes (1890–present)
| Month | Jan | Feb | Mar | Apr | May | Jun | Jul | Aug | Sep | Oct | Nov | Dec | Year |
|---|---|---|---|---|---|---|---|---|---|---|---|---|---|
| Record high °C (°F) | 22.6 (72.7) | 25.3 (77.5) | 28.2 (82.8) | 32.2 (90.0) | 37.6 (99.7) | 44.8 (112.6) | 42.8 (109.0) | 43.9 (111.0) | 38.7 (101.7) | 36.5 (97.7) | 30.5 (86.9) | 22.9 (73.2) | 44.8 (112.6) |
| Mean daily maximum °C (°F) | 13.3 (55.9) | 14.2 (57.6) | 17.0 (62.6) | 21.1 (70.0) | 26.5 (79.7) | 31.6 (88.9) | 34.3 (93.7) | 34.3 (93.7) | 30.6 (87.1) | 24.4 (75.9) | 18.9 (66.0) | 14.4 (57.9) | 23.3 (73.9) |
| Daily mean °C (°F) | 10.2 (50.4) | 10.8 (51.4) | 13.1 (55.6) | 16.7 (62.1) | 21.8 (71.2) | 26.6 (79.9) | 29.3 (84.7) | 29.4 (84.9) | 25.0 (77.0) | 20.3 (68.5) | 15.6 (60.1) | 11.6 (52.9) | 19.2 (66.6) |
| Mean daily minimum °C (°F) | 7.1 (44.8) | 7.3 (45.1) | 9.2 (48.6) | 12.3 (54.1) | 17.0 (62.6) | 21.6 (70.9) | 24.2 (75.6) | 24.4 (75.9) | 20.4 (68.7) | 16.2 (61.2) | 12.2 (54.0) | 8.7 (47.7) | 15.0 (59.0) |
| Record low °C (°F) | −6.5 (20.3) | −5.7 (21.7) | −2.6 (27.3) | 1.7 (35.1) | 6.2 (43.2) | 11.8 (53.2) | 16 (61) | 15.5 (59.9) | 8.9 (48.0) | 5.9 (42.6) | −1.1 (30.0) | −4.0 (24.8) | −6.5 (20.3) |
| Average rainfall mm (inches) | 55.6 (2.19) | 44.4 (1.75) | 45.6 (1.80) | 27.6 (1.09) | 20.7 (0.81) | 11.6 (0.46) | 10.7 (0.42) | 5.4 (0.21) | 25.8 (1.02) | 38.6 (1.52) | 70.8 (2.79) | 76.3 (3.00) | 433.1 (17.06) |
| Average relative humidity (%) | 72.0 | 70.0 | 66.0 | 60.0 | 56.0 | 50.0 | 42.0 | 47.0 | 57.0 | 66.0 | 72.0 | 73.0 | 60.9 |
Source 1: Cosmos, scientific magazine of the National Observatory of Athens
Source 2: Meteoclub

Climate data for Araxos, Patras (1955–2010) 11 m. asl
| Month | Jan | Feb | Mar | Apr | May | Jun | Jul | Aug | Sep | Oct | Nov | Dec | Year |
|---|---|---|---|---|---|---|---|---|---|---|---|---|---|
| Mean daily maximum °C (°F) | 13.8 (56.8) | 14.2 (57.6) | 16.1 (61.0) | 19.3 (66.7) | 24.2 (75.6) | 28.5 (83.3) | 33.3 (91.9) | 33.6 (92.5) | 29.0 (84.2) | 23.5 (74.3) | 18.9 (66.0) | 15.2 (59.4) | 22.1 (71.8) |
| Daily mean °C (°F) | 10.2 (50.4) | 10.5 (50.9) | 12.3 (54.1) | 15.4 (59.7) | 20.0 (68.0) | 24.3 (75.7) | 26.9 (80.4) | 27.0 (80.6) | 23.4 (74.1) | 19.1 (66.4) | 14.8 (58.6) | 11.6 (52.9) | 18.0 (64.4) |
| Mean daily minimum °C (°F) | 6.2 (43.2) | 6.3 (43.3) | 7.6 (45.7) | 9.8 (49.6) | 13.3 (55.9) | 16.8 (62.2) | 19.0 (66.2) | 19.8 (67.6) | 17.2 (63.0) | 14.2 (57.6) | 10.6 (51.1) | 7.8 (46.0) | 12.4 (54.3) |
| Average rainfall mm (inches) | 93.2 (3.67) | 78.7 (3.10) | 61.8 (2.43) | 43.6 (1.72) | 20.1 (0.79) | 8.6 (0.34) | 4.1 (0.16) | 5.9 (0.23) | 33.1 (1.30) | 83.8 (3.30) | 129.9 (5.11) | 121.2 (4.77) | 684.0 (26.93) |
| Average rainy days | 13.7 | 12.4 | 11.6 | 9.1 | 6.0 | 2.6 | 0.9 | 1.2 | 5.1 | 9.4 | 12.6 | 15.9 | 100.5 |
Source: Hellenic National Meteorological Service

=== Alpine Mediterranean ===
In this climate type (Köppen climate classification: Csc) with much lower temperatures, the winter is harsh with abundant snowfalls, while the summers are cool with occasional thunderstorms. This climate is to be found on high mountains, like in the Pindus and Rhodope mountains, and predominantly the higher elevations of the mountains of Crete.

=== Transitional continental - Mediterranean ===
This climate is classified as between humid subtropical and continental (Köppen climate classification: Cfa and Dfa) with strong characteristics of both the continental and Mediterranean climate.

Climate data for Florina (1961–2010)
| Month | Jan | Feb | Mar | Apr | May | Jun | Jul | Aug | Sep | Oct | Nov | Dec | Year |
|---|---|---|---|---|---|---|---|---|---|---|---|---|---|
| Record high °C (°F) | 18.0 (64.4) | 23.0 (73.4) | 25.8 (78.4) | 31.2 (88.2) | 33.8 (92.8) | 39.0 (102.2) | 40.8 (105.4) | 38.6 (101.5) | 36.0 (96.8) | 32.2 (90.0) | 26.6 (79.9) | 21.0 (69.8) | 40.8 (105.4) |
| Mean daily maximum °C (°F) | 4.7 (40.5) | 7.4 (45.3) | 12.0 (53.6) | 16.8 (62.2) | 22.0 (71.6) | 26.4 (79.5) | 29.0 (84.2) | 29.0 (84.2) | 24.7 (76.5) | 19.0 (66.2) | 12.2 (54.0) | 5.9 (42.6) | 17.4 (63.4) |
| Daily mean °C (°F) | 0.6 (33.1) | 2.8 (37.0) | 7.0 (44.6) | 11.7 (53.1) | 16.9 (62.4) | 21.1 (70.0) | 23.4 (74.1) | 22.8 (73.0) | 18.2 (64.8) | 12.9 (55.2) | 7.2 (45.0) | 2.0 (35.6) | 12.2 (54.0) |
| Mean daily minimum °C (°F) | −3.1 (26.4) | −1.7 (28.9) | 1.5 (34.7) | 5.4 (41.7) | 9.5 (49.1) | 12.8 (55.0) | 14.8 (58.6) | 14.7 (58.5) | 11.4 (52.5) | 7.1 (44.8) | 2.6 (36.7) | −1.8 (28.8) | 6.1 (43.0) |
| Record low °C (°F) | −25.1 (−13.2) | −23.0 (−9.4) | −13.6 (7.5) | −5.0 (23.0) | 0.0 (32.0) | 2.4 (36.3) | 6.6 (43.9) | 4.0 (39.2) | −1.4 (29.5) | −5.0 (23.0) | −12.6 (9.3) | −18.6 (−1.5) | −25.1 (−13.2) |
| Average precipitation mm (inches) | 56.8 (2.24) | 51.1 (2.01) | 57.8 (2.28) | 60.4 (2.38) | 59.4 (2.34) | 37.3 (1.47) | 33.9 (1.33) | 30.6 (1.20) | 50.1 (1.97) | 69.2 (2.72) | 71.3 (2.81) | 85.6 (3.37) | 663.5 (26.12) |
| Average precipitation days | 11.0 | 10.6 | 11.1 | 10.6 | 10.7 | 7.2 | 5.5 | 5.3 | 6.5 | 7.6 | 9.7 | 11.8 | 107.6 |
| Average snowy days | 7.5 | 6.3 | 4.5 | 0.8 | 0.0 | 0.0 | 0.0 | 0.0 | 0.0 | 0.3 | 1.8 | 5.9 | 27.1 |
| Average relative humidity (%) | 81.2 | 76.4 | 68.8 | 63.2 | 62.8 | 58.6 | 55.4 | 56.9 | 63.3 | 71.4 | 77.8 | 81.7 | 68.1 |
Source: Hellenic National Meteorological Service

== Semi-arid climate ==
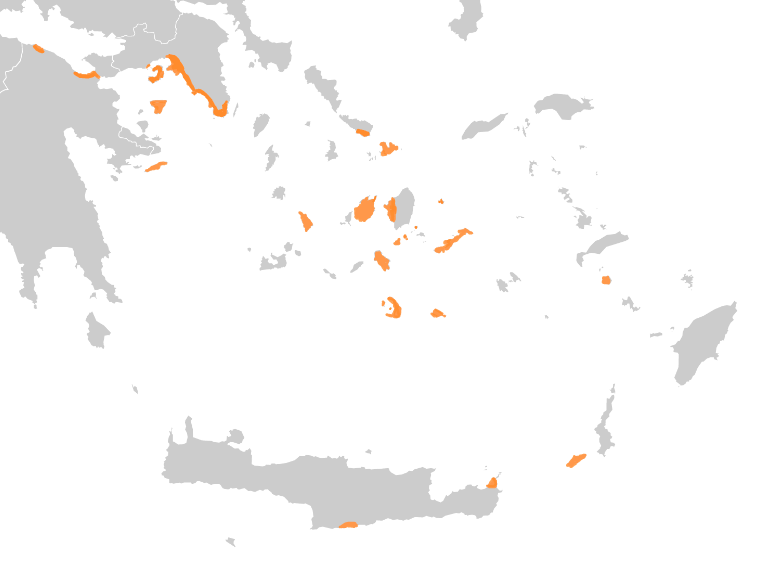
Hot semi-arid climate in Greece according to the National Observatory of Athens.

According to the Climate Atlas of Greece published by the Hellenic National Meteorological Service and the network of the National Observatory of Athens, a hot semi-arid climate (Köppen climate classification: BSh) is found primarily in Piraeus and much of the Athens Riviera (with Anavyssos being the driest area of mainland Greece), areas of West Attica (Aspropyrgos, Salamina, Vlychada) and the Gulf of Corinth, most of the Cyclades (with Schoinoussa being the driest area in Greece), some islands of the Argo-Saronic Gulf (Aigina, Hydra), some areas of Crete (Lentas, Psari Forada, Moni Toplou), Gavdos, some islands of the Dodecanese (Kasos, Nisyros, Karpathos) and locally in Chalkidiki (Neos Marmaras) and in downtown Thessaloniki.

Cold semi-arid climate (Köppen climate classification: BSk) is found in many areas of Macedonia and Thessaly, including the largest part of Thessaloniki, the second largest city in Greece.

Climate data for Piraeus Hellenic National Meteorological Service (1981-2010)
| Month | Jan | Feb | Mar | Apr | May | Jun | Jul | Aug | Sep | Oct | Nov | Dec | Year |
|---|---|---|---|---|---|---|---|---|---|---|---|---|---|
| Mean daily maximum °C (°F) | 14.1 (57.4) | 14.4 (57.9) | 16.6 (61.9) | 20.3 (68.5) | 25.1 (77.2) | 29.9 (85.8) | 32.8 (91.0) | 32.9 (91.2) | 29.1 (84.4) | 24.2 (75.6) | 18.9 (66.0) | 15.4 (59.7) | 22.81 (73.06) |
| Daily mean °C (°F) | 11.1 (52.0) | 11.2 (52.2) | 13.3 (55.9) | 16.9 (62.4) | 21.4 (70.5) | 26.3 (79.3) | 29.0 (84.2) | 28.8 (83.8) | 25.2 (77.4) | 20.6 (69.1) | 15.8 (60.4) | 12.6 (54.7) | 19.35 (66.83) |
| Mean daily minimum °C (°F) | 8.2 (46.8) | 7.9 (46.2) | 10.0 (50.0) | 13.4 (56.1) | 17.7 (63.9) | 22.2 (72.0) | 24.8 (76.6) | 25.0 (77.0) | 21.5 (70.7) | 17.4 (63.3) | 12.9 (55.2) | 9.7 (49.5) | 15.89 (60.60) |
| Average rainfall mm (inches) | 41.95 (1.65) | 36.26 (1.43) | 34.09 (1.34) | 30.34 (1.19) | 15.95 (0.63) | 5.08 (0.20) | 5.56 (0.22) | 3.07 (0.12) | 11.37 (0.45) | 30.5 (1.20) | 58.87 (2.32) | 58.84 (2.32) | 331.9 (13.07) |
Source: National Technical University of Athens

Climate data for Aristotle University of Thessaloniki 32 m asl, 1991 – 2020 normals (extremes 1930-present)
| Month | Jan | Feb | Mar | Apr | May | Jun | Jul | Aug | Sep | Oct | Nov | Dec | Year |
|---|---|---|---|---|---|---|---|---|---|---|---|---|---|
| Record high °C (°F) | 22.5 (72.5) | 25.1 (77.2) | 30.1 (86.2) | 32.2 (90.0) | 37.8 (100.0) | 41.2 (106.2) | 43.3 (109.9) | 41.6 (106.9) | 40.3 (104.5) | 33.4 (92.1) | 28.1 (82.6) | 24.4 (75.9) | 43.3 (109.9) |
| Mean daily maximum °C (°F) | 10.6 (51.1) | 12.4 (54.3) | 15.6 (60.1) | 19.7 (67.5) | 25.2 (77.4) | 30.0 (86.0) | 32.3 (90.1) | 32.3 (90.1) | 27.8 (82.0) | 22.1 (71.8) | 16.6 (61.9) | 11.8 (53.2) | 21.4 (70.5) |
| Daily mean °C (°F) | 7.0 (44.6) | 8.4 (47.1) | 11.2 (52.2) | 14.9 (58.8) | 20.0 (68.0) | 24.7 (76.5) | 27.0 (80.6) | 27.1 (80.8) | 22.7 (72.9) | 17.7 (63.9) | 12.8 (55.0) | 8.3 (46.9) | 16.8 (62.3) |
| Mean daily minimum °C (°F) | 3.4 (38.1) | 4.4 (39.9) | 6.8 (44.2) | 10.1 (50.2) | 14.9 (58.8) | 19.4 (66.9) | 21.8 (71.2) | 21.9 (71.4) | 17.6 (63.7) | 13.4 (56.1) | 9.0 (48.2) | 4.9 (40.8) | 12.3 (54.1) |
| Record low °C (°F) | −12.6 (9.3) | −8.9 (16.0) | −8.2 (17.2) | −0.4 (31.3) | 5.2 (41.4) | 8.6 (47.5) | 12.0 (53.6) | 10.3 (50.5) | 7.7 (45.9) | 1.4 (34.5) | −2.8 (27.0) | −8.2 (17.2) | −12.6 (9.3) |
| Average precipitation mm (inches) | 34.1 (1.34) | 33.6 (1.32) | 39.5 (1.56) | 37.5 (1.48) | 51.0 (2.01) | 31.6 (1.24) | 27.0 (1.06) | 25.1 (0.99) | 37.4 (1.47) | 43.7 (1.72) | 40.9 (1.61) | 48.2 (1.90) | 449.6 (17.7) |
Source: Aristotle University of Thessaloniki, World Meteorological Organization

== Temperature ==
- Abs. minimum temperature: −27.8 °C (−18.0 °F), Ptolemaida (-35.3 °C was recorded in a sinkhole in Kechroti).
- Abs. maximum temperature: 48.0 °C (118.4 °F), Elefsina

Various areas of the country have registered temperatures over 46.0 °C (114.8 °F) and below −21.0 °C (−5.8 °F). The 48.0 °C (118.4 °F) recorded by minimum/maximum thermometers in Tatoi and Elefsina on 10 July 1977 as reported by a communication of Dr. Athanasios D. Sarantopoulos was also the WMO record high temperature for Europe until 11 August 2021 (44 years). Average annual temperatures in Greece range from around +4 °C (39 °F) in Kaimaktsalan up to +22 °C (72 °F) in Lindos. Summer average highs in Greece are the highest in Skala, Messenia and the Evrotas Valley. Mainland Greece records a very high number of tropical nights reaching locally over 130 in Monemvasia while the islands can climb close to 160 tropical nights in Kastellorizo. Winter average temperatures locally reach over 15.0 °C (59.0 °F) in the Dodecanese and below −3.0 °C (26.6 °F) in mountainous areas.

Climate data for Lindos 65 m a.s.l.
| Month | Jan | Feb | Mar | Apr | May | Jun | Jul | Aug | Sep | Oct | Nov | Dec | Year |
|---|---|---|---|---|---|---|---|---|---|---|---|---|---|
| Record high °C (°F) | 21.9 (71.4) | 24.8 (76.6) | 25.9 (78.6) | 32.4 (90.3) | 36.2 (97.2) | 43.6 (110.5) | 43.6 (110.5) | 43.1 (109.6) | 39.8 (103.6) | 37.9 (100.2) | 27.2 (81.0) | 22.5 (72.5) | 43.6 (110.5) |
| Mean daily maximum °C (°F) | 16.4 (61.5) | 16.9 (62.4) | 18.6 (65.5) | 22.5 (72.5) | 26.9 (80.4) | 31.8 (89.2) | 35.5 (95.9) | 35.0 (95.0) | 31.6 (88.9) | 26.7 (80.1) | 22.0 (71.6) | 18.3 (64.9) | 25.2 (77.3) |
| Daily mean °C (°F) | 13.8 (56.8) | 14.2 (57.6) | 15.7 (60.3) | 19.1 (66.4) | 23.2 (73.8) | 27.9 (82.2) | 31.5 (88.7) | 31.4 (88.5) | 28.2 (82.8) | 23.7 (74.7) | 19.4 (66.9) | 15.8 (60.4) | 22.0 (71.6) |
| Mean daily minimum °C (°F) | 11.3 (52.3) | 11.6 (52.9) | 12.8 (55.0) | 15.7 (60.3) | 19.5 (67.1) | 24.1 (75.4) | 27.6 (81.7) | 27.8 (82.0) | 24.8 (76.6) | 20.7 (69.3) | 16.7 (62.1) | 13.2 (55.8) | 18.8 (65.9) |
| Record low °C (°F) | 1.1 (34.0) | 3.3 (37.9) | 3.1 (37.6) | 9.4 (48.9) | 13.8 (56.8) | 16.8 (62.2) | 21.1 (70.0) | 24.0 (75.2) | 16.3 (61.3) | 13.1 (55.6) | 8.8 (47.8) | 4.3 (39.7) | 1.1 (34.0) |
| Average rainfall mm (inches) | 107.2 (4.22) | 74.5 (2.93) | 45.1 (1.78) | 10.8 (0.43) | 11.0 (0.43) | 2.5 (0.10) | 1.4 (0.06) | 0.04 (0.00) | 6.1 (0.24) | 22.5 (0.89) | 77.0 (3.03) | 123.9 (4.88) | 482.04 (18.99) |
Source 1: National Observatory of Athens (May 2014-Feb 2025)
Source 2: World Meteorological Organization

Climate data for Kaimaktsalan Ski Center, Greece 2090 m a.s.l (2008-2023)
| Month | Jan | Feb | Mar | Apr | May | Jun | Jul | Aug | Sep | Oct | Nov | Dec | Year |
|---|---|---|---|---|---|---|---|---|---|---|---|---|---|
| Record high °C (°F) | 9.4 (48.9) | 11.0 (51.8) | 10.3 (50.5) | 18.0 (64.4) | 21.3 (70.3) | 23.1 (73.6) | 25.5 (77.9) | 24.6 (76.3) | 21.3 (70.3) | 17.4 (63.3) | 14.1 (57.4) | 11.3 (52.3) | 25.5 (77.9) |
| Mean daily maximum °C (°F) | −1.8 (28.8) | −1.0 (30.2) | 0.8 (33.4) | 4.4 (39.9) | 9.5 (49.1) | 13.6 (56.5) | 16.7 (62.1) | 16.6 (61.9) | 12.4 (54.3) | 7.9 (46.2) | 4.6 (40.3) | 0.1 (32.2) | 7.0 (44.6) |
| Daily mean °C (°F) | −4.2 (24.4) | −3.6 (25.5) | −1.9 (28.6) | 1.8 (35.2) | 6.5 (43.7) | 10.5 (50.9) | 13.2 (55.8) | 13.1 (55.6) | 9.3 (48.7) | 5.1 (41.2) | 2.1 (35.8) | −2.3 (27.9) | 4.1 (39.4) |
| Mean daily minimum °C (°F) | −6.6 (20.1) | −6.2 (20.8) | −4.5 (23.9) | −0.9 (30.4) | 3.5 (38.3) | 7.3 (45.1) | 9.6 (49.3) | 9.6 (49.3) | 6.2 (43.2) | 2.3 (36.1) | −0.5 (31.1) | −4.7 (23.5) | 1.3 (34.3) |
| Record low °C (°F) | −20.8 (−5.4) | −20.0 (−4.0) | −19.1 (−2.4) | −11.3 (11.7) | −4.6 (23.7) | −0.6 (30.9) | 2.6 (36.7) | 1.7 (35.1) | −4.5 (23.9) | −10.0 (14.0) | −12.1 (10.2) | −16.9 (1.6) | −20.8 (−5.4) |
| Average precipitation mm (inches) | 89.7 (3.53) | 57.6 (2.27) | 58.8 (2.31) | 63.5 (2.50) | 99.2 (3.91) | 90.6 (3.57) | 32.6 (1.28) | 59.6 (2.35) | 74.6 (2.94) | 89.0 (3.50) | 113.1 (4.45) | 88.4 (3.48) | 916.7 (36.09) |
| Average precipitation days (≥ 1.0 mm) | 9.1 | 8.4 | 8.9 | 9.4 | 10.5 | 9.4 | 5.4 | 5.9 | 8.1 | 6.7 | 7.1 | 8.6 | 97.4 |
Source 1: National Observatory of Athens Monthly Bulletins (Feb 2008 - Sep 2023)
Source 2: Kaimaktsalan N.O.A station and World Meteorological Organization

Climate data for Sparta (2009–2025)
| Month | Jan | Feb | Mar | Apr | May | Jun | Jul | Aug | Sep | Oct | Nov | Dec | Year |
|---|---|---|---|---|---|---|---|---|---|---|---|---|---|
| Record high °C (°F) | 23.5 (74.3) | 26.4 (79.5) | 27.2 (81.0) | 34.1 (93.4) | 40.7 (105.3) | 44.4 (111.9) | 44.2 (111.6) | 45.7 (114.3) | 40.3 (104.5) | 36.4 (97.5) | 30.8 (87.4) | 23.5 (74.3) | 45.7 (114.3) |
| Mean daily maximum °C (°F) | 14.6 (58.3) | 15.9 (60.6) | 18.6 (65.5) | 22.9 (73.2) | 27.8 (82.0) | 32.9 (91.2) | 36.3 (97.3) | 36.0 (96.8) | 31.3 (88.3) | 25.5 (77.9) | 20.2 (68.4) | 16.0 (60.8) | 24.8 (76.7) |
| Daily mean °C (°F) | 8.9 (48.0) | 9.9 (49.8) | 12.1 (53.8) | 15.5 (59.9) | 20.0 (68.0) | 24.9 (76.8) | 28.0 (82.4) | 27.8 (82.0) | 23.9 (75.0) | 18.6 (65.5) | 14.0 (57.2) | 10.2 (50.4) | 17.8 (64.1) |
| Mean daily minimum °C (°F) | 3.1 (37.6) | 3.9 (39.0) | 5.6 (42.1) | 8.1 (46.6) | 12.2 (54.0) | 16.9 (62.4) | 19.7 (67.5) | 19.7 (67.5) | 16.4 (61.5) | 11.7 (53.1) | 7.8 (46.0) | 4.4 (39.9) | 10.8 (51.4) |
| Record low °C (°F) | −5.3 (22.5) | −4.2 (24.4) | −4.6 (23.7) | −0.7 (30.7) | 6.2 (43.2) | 9.4 (48.9) | 14.2 (57.6) | 13.1 (55.6) | 9.1 (48.4) | 1.5 (34.7) | −1.7 (28.9) | −5.2 (22.6) | −5.3 (22.5) |
| Average rainfall mm (inches) | 124.6 (4.91) | 80.5 (3.17) | 59.9 (2.36) | 32.2 (1.27) | 25.1 (0.99) | 32.0 (1.26) | 10.4 (0.41) | 19.9 (0.78) | 51.2 (2.02) | 59.4 (2.34) | 91.9 (3.62) | 97.4 (3.83) | 684.5 (26.96) |
Source: National Observatory of Athens (Feb 2009 - Aug 2025), Sparta N.O.A station, World Meteorological Organization

=== Mean absolute minimum temperatures ===
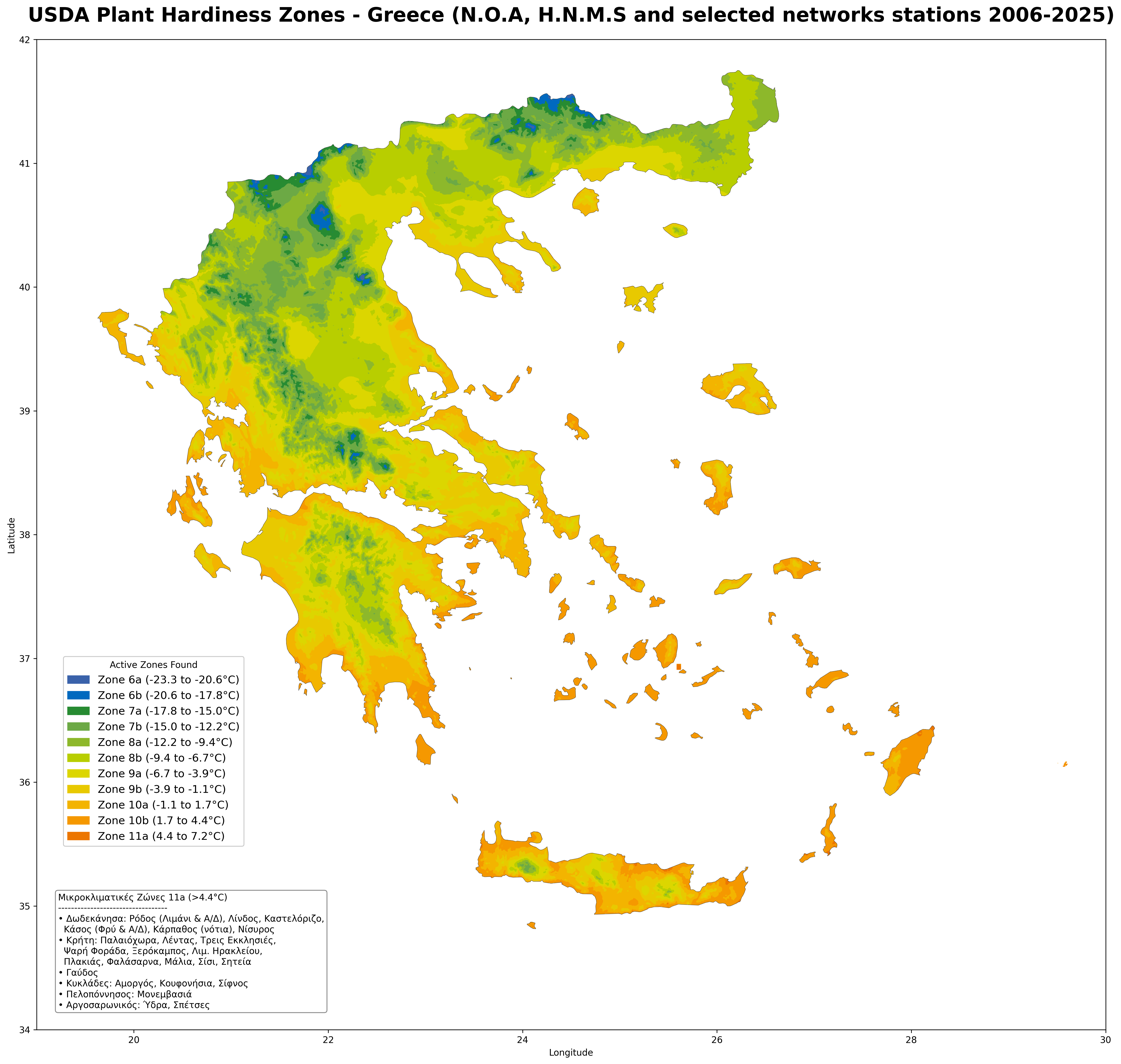
Hardiness zones in Greece.

Based on mean absolute minimum temperatures, plant hardiness zones in Greece vary from 6a to 11a. Downtown Athens falls in 10a zone while the Athens Riviera falls mostly in 10b zone. Thessaloniki straddles 9a/9b zones while areas in Macedonia may reach up to 10a zone (Great Lavra, Neos Marmaras). Zone 11a can be found in the Dodecanese, Crete, Cyclades and the Argo-Saronic Gulf, while Monemvasia in mainland Greece also falls in 11a zone. According to the Gouvas formula which adjusted USDA plant hardiness zones for Greece, Kasos also falls in 11b zone.

The table below provides USDA hardiness zones for selected areas from the data of the National Observatory of Athens and other public authorities.

| City | Zone |
|---|---|
| Kastellorizo | 11a |
| Kasos | 11a |
| Karpathos | 11a |
| Lindos | 11a |
| Gavdos | 11a |
| Psari Forada | 11a |
| Lentas | 11a |
| Palaiochora | 11a |
| Rhodes Port | 11a |
| Rhodes Airport | 11a |
| Falasarna | 11a |
| Heraklion Port | 11a |
| Plakias | 11a |
| Amorgos | 11a |
| Nisyros | 11a |
| Hydra | 11a |
| Monemvasia | 11a |
| Koufonisia | 11a |
| Spetses | 11a |
| Sisi | 11a |
| Sifnos | 11a |
| Sitia | 11a |
| Malia | 11a |
| Patmos | 10b |
| Naxos | 10b |
| Patras Port | 10b |
| Lavrio | 10b |
| Nea Smyrni | 10b |
| Palaio Faliro | 10b |
| Gazi, Athens | 10a |
| Kifissia | 10a |
| Arta | 10a |
| Great Lavra | 10a |
| Kalamaria | 9b |
| Ippokrateios Politeia | 9a |
| Nemea | 9a |
| Serres | 8b |
| Alexandroupolis | 8b |
| Kaimaktsalan | 7a |
| Vathistalos (doline) | 6a |

=== Average annual temperatures for selected areas ===
| Area | °C |
|---|---|
| Tris Ekklisies | 22.1 |
| Lindos | 22.0 |
| Kastellorizo | 21.9 |
| Psari Forada | 21.6 |
| Lentas | 21.0 |
| Piraeus Port | 21.0 |
| Rhodes Port | 20.9 |
| Palaiochora | 20.7 |
| Gavdos | 20.5 |
| Nea Smyrni | 20.5 |
| Moschato | 20.5 |
| Falasarna | 20.5 |
| Hydra | 20.4 |
| Monemvasia | 20.3 |
| Piraeus Pedagogiki | 20.3 |
| Neos Kosmos | 20.2 |
| Salamina | 20.2 |
| Palaio Faliro | 20.2 |
| Nikaia | 20.1 |
| Perama | 20.1 |
| Piraeus Kallipoli | 20.1 |
| Patisia | 20.0 |
| Kasos | 20.0 |

=== Heatwaves ===
According to HNMS the summer of 2024 was by far the warmest in the country's meteorological history, registering average summer temperatures as high as 32.0 °C. In fact, according to NOA Lindos recorded the highest average summer temperature in Europe with 32.0 °C (89.6 °F). In June 2024, both Sparta and Serres registered a record mean max temperature of 37.6 °C (99.7 °F) while temperatures soared as high as 44.5 °C (112.1 °F) on the island of Crete. According to the National Observatory of Athens, in July 2024 Greece experienced a 16-day heatwave, its longest in recorded history. Gavalou and Serres had 14 consecutive days with temperatures over 40 °C (104 °F), while minimum temperatures remained over 30 °C (86 °F) for 12 consecutive days in metropolitan Athens. In July 2024, the Hellenic National Meteorological Service station in Serres recorded a record mean maximum temperature of 39.1 °C (102.4 °F).

In July 2023, another long-lasting major heatwave struck the country with record-breaking temperatures mostly in the eastern part of the mainland. The World Meteorological Organization station in Gytheio, Peloponnese registered 46.4 °C (115.5 °F), the highest value a National Observatory of Athens station has measured since records begun in 2006, and one of the highest values ever recorded in the country by any official institution. As a result of this heatwave, devastating fires burned forested areas in southern Rhodes and Laconia

In 2021, the government officials announced that they were considering giving the heatwaves names that could help people better prepare for more extreme heat after one of the longest and most intense heat waves in recorded history affected the country from 26 July to 10 August of that year, during which many records that stood for decades broke. Other notable heatwaves include the 2007 European heat wave and that of July 1987.

=== Wildfires ===
Major wildfires, attributed to the effects of global heating, broke out in "practically every region" of Greece in 2023 when temperatures in mainland Greece reached 45 °C (113 °F). There were also major wildfires in 2024 (reaching the suburbs of Athens) and 2025.

== Precipitation ==
The lowest average annual precipitation in Greece is recorded in Xerokampos, Crete with 219 mm while the highest average annual precipitation in the country is recorded in Theodoriana, Epirus, with 2529 mm. According to Mariolopoulos (1938) the south east tip of Lasithi recorded a mean annual precipitation of only 207.1 mm (1915-1929) and showed a Mediterranean desert climate. Ioannina, the capital city of Epirus is considered to be the wettest city in mainland Greece with a population of over 50,000 inhabitants, receiving precipitation just short of 1,100 mm per year.

Climate data for Xerokampos 8 m a.s.l. Climate: Hot semi-arid climate (BSh) • USDA: 11a (5.64°C)
| Month | Jan | Feb | Mar | Apr | May | Jun | Jul | Aug | Sep | Oct | Nov | Dec | Year |
|---|---|---|---|---|---|---|---|---|---|---|---|---|---|
| Record high °C (°F) | 22.8 (73.0) | 22.8 (73.0) | 22.6 (72.7) | 27.6 (81.7) | 32.7 (90.9) | 36.4 (97.5) | 40.5 (104.9) | 36.1 (97.0) | 35.8 (96.4) | 30.6 (87.1) | 27.4 (81.3) | 25.1 (77.2) | 40.5 (104.9) |
| Mean daily maximum °C (°F) | 16.6 (61.9) | 16.2 (61.2) | 17.2 (63.0) | 20.3 (68.5) | 24.6 (76.3) | 28.8 (83.8) | 31.8 (89.2) | 30.9 (87.6) | 28.8 (83.8) | 25.0 (77.0) | 21.6 (70.9) | 18.4 (65.1) | 23.4 (74.1) |
| Daily mean °C (°F) | 14.5 (58.1) | 14.0 (57.2) | 14.9 (58.8) | 17.7 (63.9) | 21.6 (70.9) | 25.7 (78.3) | 28.8 (83.8) | 28.5 (83.3) | 26.4 (79.5) | 22.7 (72.9) | 19.5 (67.1) | 16.5 (61.7) | 20.9 (69.6) |
| Mean daily minimum °C (°F) | 12.4 (54.3) | 11.9 (53.4) | 12.5 (54.5) | 15.1 (59.2) | 18.6 (65.5) | 22.7 (72.9) | 25.8 (78.4) | 26.0 (78.8) | 24.0 (75.2) | 20.4 (68.7) | 17.4 (63.3) | 14.5 (58.1) | 18.5 (65.3) |
| Record low °C (°F) | 3.8 (38.8) | 5.1 (41.2) | 3.8 (38.8) | 9.4 (48.9) | 13.6 (56.5) | 17.6 (63.7) | 22.1 (71.8) | 23.3 (73.9) | 20.3 (68.5) | 14.8 (58.6) | 12.1 (53.8) | 9.7 (49.5) | 3.8 (38.8) |
| Average rainfall mm (inches) | 49.0 (1.93) | 39.2 (1.54) | 29.6 (1.17) | 7.6 (0.30) | 5.4 (0.21) | 5.5 (0.22) | 0.3 (0.01) | 0.7 (0.03) | 2.6 (0.10) | 21.6 (0.85) | 18.5 (0.73) | 39.5 (1.56) | 219.5 (8.65) |
Source: Xerokampos Davis station (Jan 2020– Mar 2026)

Climate data for East Ierapetra (1915-1929)
| Month | Jan | Feb | Mar | Apr | May | Jun | Jul | Aug | Sep | Oct | Nov | Dec | Year |
|---|---|---|---|---|---|---|---|---|---|---|---|---|---|
| Average rainfall mm (inches) | 52.3 (2.06) | 28.8 (1.13) | 17.3 (0.68) | 8.2 (0.32) | 4.4 (0.17) | 6.0 (0.24) | 0.0 (0.0) | 0.0 (0.0) | 5.1 (0.20) | 14.1 (0.56) | 31.2 (1.23) | 39.7 (1.56) | 207.1 (8.15) |

Climate data for Theodoriana 962 m a.s.l. (2009-2023)
| Month | Jan | Feb | Mar | Apr | May | Jun | Jul | Aug | Sep | Oct | Nov | Dec | Year |
|---|---|---|---|---|---|---|---|---|---|---|---|---|---|
| Mean daily maximum °C (°F) | 6.7 (44.1) | 8.6 (47.5) | 11.1 (52.0) | 15.7 (60.3) | 19.8 (67.6) | 24.6 (76.3) | 28.1 (82.6) | 28.4 (83.1) | 23.3 (73.9) | 18.1 (64.6) | 13.4 (56.1) | 9.0 (48.2) | 17.2 (63.0) |
| Daily mean °C (°F) | 3.1 (37.6) | 4.6 (40.3) | 6.5 (43.7) | 10.5 (50.9) | 14.3 (57.7) | 18.5 (65.3) | 21.4 (70.5) | 21.7 (71.1) | 17.6 (63.7) | 13.1 (55.6) | 9.3 (48.7) | 5.2 (41.4) | 12.2 (53.9) |
| Mean daily minimum °C (°F) | −0.5 (31.1) | 0.6 (33.1) | 1.9 (35.4) | 5.3 (41.5) | 8.8 (47.8) | 12.4 (54.3) | 14.7 (58.5) | 15.0 (59.0) | 11.8 (53.2) | 8.1 (46.6) | 5.1 (41.2) | 1.4 (34.5) | 7.1 (44.7) |
| Average precipitation mm (inches) | 413.8 (16.29) | 304.7 (12.00) | 225.8 (8.89) | 153.7 (6.05) | 131.7 (5.19) | 96.7 (3.81) | 45.5 (1.79) | 42.8 (1.69) | 138.4 (5.45) | 213.6 (8.41) | 381.6 (15.02) | 380.6 (14.98) | 2,528.9 (99.57) |
Source 1: National Observatory of Athens Monthly Bulletins (Dec 2009 - Dec 2023)
Source 2: Theodoriana N.O.A station and World Meteorological Organization

Climate data for Ioannina (475 m; 1956–2010)
| Month | Jan | Feb | Mar | Apr | May | Jun | Jul | Aug | Sep | Oct | Nov | Dec | Year |
|---|---|---|---|---|---|---|---|---|---|---|---|---|---|
| Mean daily maximum °C (°F) | 9.0 (48.2) | 10.4 (50.7) | 13.7 (56.7) | 17.5 (63.5) | 23.0 (73.4) | 27.7 (81.9) | 31.0 (87.8) | 31.0 (87.8) | 26.1 (79.0) | 20.6 (69.1) | 14.7 (58.5) | 10.0 (50.0) | 20.0 (68.0) |
| Daily mean °C (°F) | 4.7 (40.5) | 6.1 (43.0) | 8.8 (47.8) | 12.4 (54.3) | 17.4 (63.3) | 21.9 (71.4) | 24.8 (76.6) | 24.3 (75.7) | 20.1 (68.2) | 14.9 (58.8) | 9.7 (49.5) | 5.9 (42.6) | 14.3 (57.7) |
| Mean daily minimum °C (°F) | 0.2 (32.4) | 1.0 (33.8) | 3.2 (37.8) | 6.1 (43.0) | 9.8 (49.6) | 13.0 (55.4) | 15.2 (59.4) | 15.3 (59.5) | 12.2 (54.0) | 8.6 (47.5) | 4.8 (40.6) | 1.7 (35.1) | 7.5 (45.5) |
| Average precipitation mm (inches) | 122.5 (4.82) | 112.5 (4.43) | 94.9 (3.74) | 76.5 (3.01) | 66.9 (2.63) | 44.1 (1.74) | 31.7 (1.25) | 30.2 (1.19) | 62.4 (2.46) | 107.5 (4.23) | 168.8 (6.65) | 171.3 (6.74) | 1,089.3 (42.89) |
| Average precipitation days | 13.3 | 12.4 | 12.8 | 12.6 | 11.0 | 6.9 | 4.8 | 4.8 | 6.5 | 9.7 | 13.7 | 15.2 | 123.7 |
| Average relative humidity (%) | 76.9 | 73.7 | 69.5 | 67.9 | 65.9 | 59.1 | 52.4 | 54.4 | 63.6 | 70.8 | 79.8 | 81.5 | 68.0 |
| Mean monthly sunshine hours | 95.3 | 107.9 | 143.4 | 165.2 | 225.2 | 296.0 | 320.7 | 296.0 | 208.2 | 160.4 | 98.1 | 75.2 | 2,191.6 |
Source: Greek National Weather Service

=== Average precipitation for selected areas ===
| Area | mm/ year |
|---|---|
| Athens | 433.1 |
| Thessaloniki | 449.6 |
| Patras | 691.6 |
| Piraeus | 331.9 |
| Piraeus (Kallipoli) | 304.1 |
| Heraklion | 480.9 |
| Larissa | 412.6 |
| Volos | 428.8 |
| Santorini | 271.1 |
| Rhodes | 608.8 |
| Corfu | 1111.3 |
| Ioannina | 1089.3 |
| Alexandroupolis | 545.5 |
| Karpathos | 290.7 |
| Anavyssos | 291.5 |
| Kasos | 247.8 |
| Theodoriana | 2528.9 |
| Schoinoussa | 239.3 |
| Psari Forada | 274.4 |
| Gavdos | 391.6 |
| Xerokampos | 219.5 |

== Local winds ==
=== Etesians ===
Probably the most well known local winds in Greece are the etesians (also known as meltemia). With their name notating their annual fluctuation (έτος (étos) means year in Greek), these winds may blow from May to October, with their highest frequency being recorded in July and August. They keep temperatures and diurnal temperature fluctuations in the Aegean Sea lower than the respective ones found in the Ionian Sea or mainland Greece.

== Sunshine ==
According to the Climatic Atlas published by the Hellenic National Meteorological Service, Greece receives less than 1.600 hours of sunshine per year in mountainous areas of Epirus and more than 3.250 hours of sunshine per year in South Crete. Greece is one of the few remaining countries in the world to exclusively use Campbell-Stokes sunshine recorders which underestimate annual sunshine by around 200 hours compared to automatic heliographs.
