= Lenta =

Lenta can refer to:

- Lenta (retail), a Russian hyper- and supermarket chain
- Lenta, Piedmont, a municipality in Italy
- Lenta.ru, a Russian online newspaper
- a barley cultivar

== See also ==
- Lentas, a coastal village in Crete
