= Manolis Plionis =

Greek astrophysicist

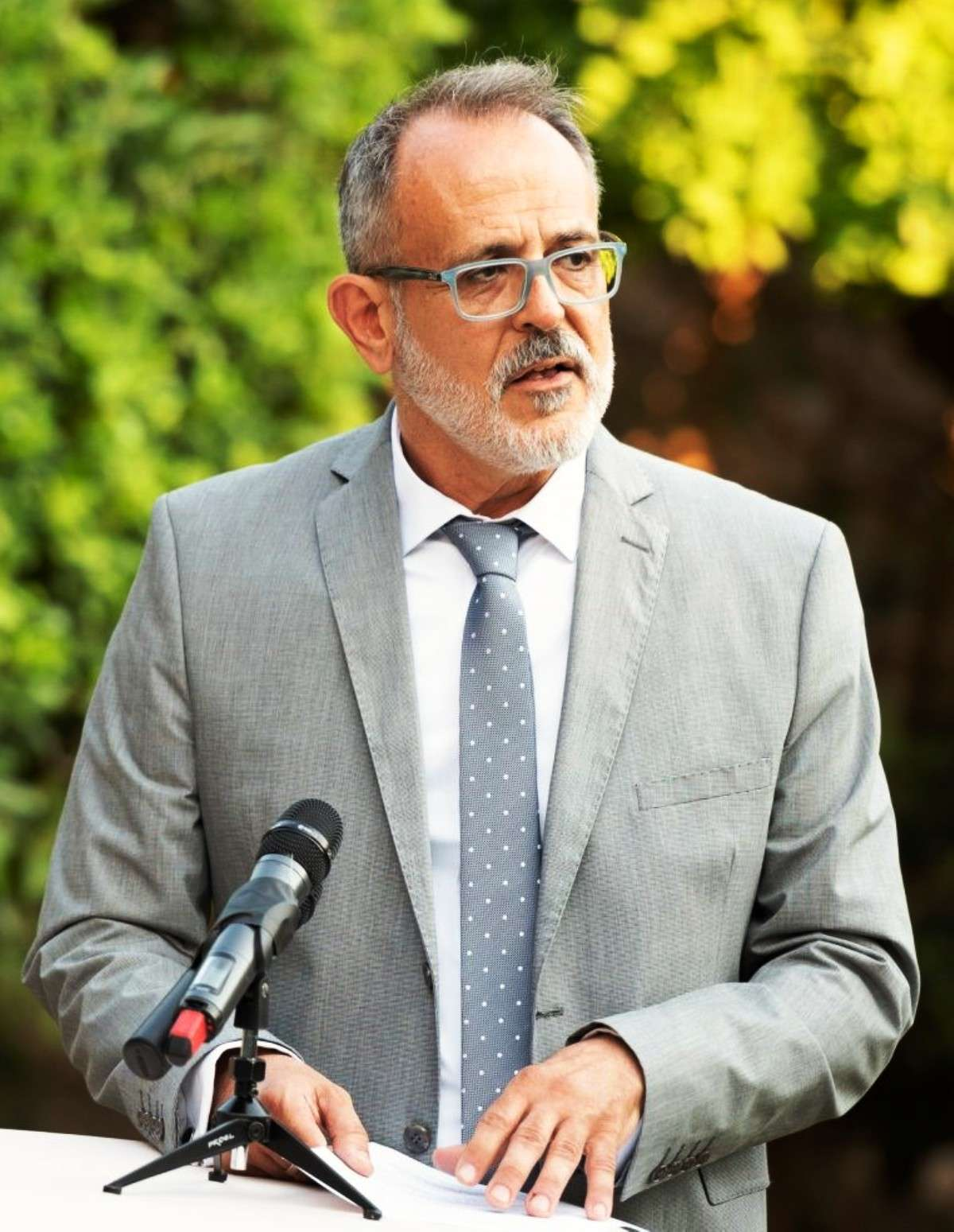
- Born: Athens
- Scientific career
- Fields: Observational and Theoretical Cosmology, Extragalactic Astrophysics, Climate Change and Natural Disaster management, legal aspects of Space endeavours
- Workplaces: University of Sussex, Aristotle University of Thessaloniki, National Institute of Astrophysics, Optics and Electronics of Mexico, National Observatory of Athens, European Univ. of Cyprus
- Thesis: Galaxy clustering and filaments
- Doctoral advisor: John D. Barrow

Manolis Plionis (Greek: Μανώλης Πλειώνης, born 13 July 1960.) is a Greek astrophysicist, known for his contributions to observational cosmology and extragalactic astrophysics. He has been a Professor at the Department of Physics of the Aristotelian University of Thessaloniki since 2012, and was the Director of the National Observatory of Athens.

== Biography ==
Manolis Plionis graduated in mathematics from the University of Crete. He then moved to the United Kingdom to pursue a scientific career focusing on large-scale structures of the universe, and in 1989 he earned his PhD from the University of Sussex. His doctoral research focused on the statistical distribution of galaxy clusters and the large-scale structures of the universe. He then spend several years in Italy as a postdoctoral researcher at the SISSA International Research Center. His scientific work received recognition through the award of the E.C. Marie Curie Fellowship. The following years he advanced his postdoctoral research activity in cosmology at the International Centre for Theoretical Physics before returning to Greece in 1995. There, he served as a researcher at the National Observatory of Athens (NAO) until 2012. In 2009, he was elected Full Professor at the Physics Department of the Aristotle University of Thessaloniki and in 2012 he officially assumed his role at the university.

In 2017 he was elected Director and President of the Board of Directors of the National Observatory of Athens. He directs a national network for climate change dubbed as the “CLIMPACT project”. The project has been nominated by the Institute for Sustainable Development of the European Public Law Organization for the 2022, 2023 and 2024 International EarthShot Prize.

During his career he also became, and remains until today, an adjunct Research Professor at the European University of Cyprus and for more than 13 years was a Visiting Researcher at the National Institute of Astrophysics, Optics and Electronics (INAOE) in Mexico.

== Research and scientific work ==
Plionis’s scientific interests span from observational cosmology to extragalactic astrophysics, to climate change and associated natural disasters as well as on space law. He is a member of the Editorial Board of the International Journal of Modern Physics D and of the Open Journal of Astrophysics.

He has also published several articles in newspapers and online concerning the legal aspects of space endeavours and the suggested legal regime for the application of rapidly expanding AI technologies in space exploration. He was the co-author of “Greek Space Law”, a book that provides an overview of the nomology/legislation that governs all space activity that falls under the jurisdiction of the Greek State.

== Awards, distinctions, nominations ==
- British Council Fellowship (1988-1989)
- Human Capital & Mobility Fellowship (early Marie Curie) - (1994-1996)
- Coordinator of the National Network for Climate Change-CLIMPACT
- Former President of the State Thematic Committee on Climate Change, Energy and Sustainable Mobility (2020-2022)
- Former Member of the European Space Science Committee (ESSC-ESF), (2017-2022)
- Member of the Greek National Committee for Astronomy
- President of the Hellenic Sectorial Scientific Council on the Environment, Energy and Sustainable Mobility
- Former Vice-President of the Bοard of Directors of NOHSIS Technology & Science Museum (2016-2019)
- Member of the International Astronomical Union (IAU)
- Certificate of Appreciation awarded European Space Agency for the recognition of his unique contribution to ESA's first deep -space optical communication link with the NASA PSYCHE spacecraft
