= Miamou =

Miamou Μιαμού
- Community
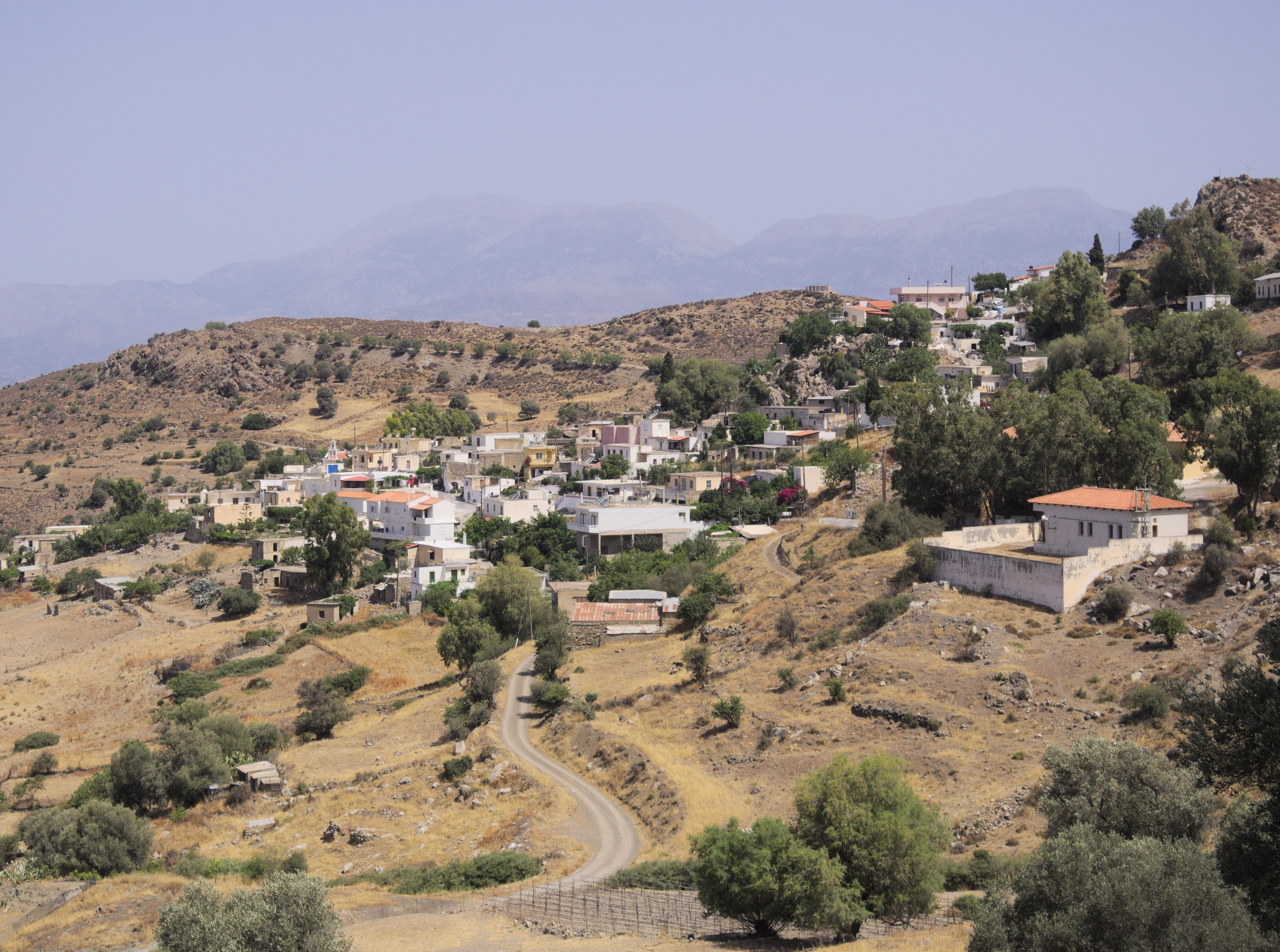
- View from SE

- Location within Greece
- Coordinates: 34°58′N 24°56′E
- Country: Greece
- Administrative region: Crete
- Regional unit: Heraklion
- Municipality: Gortyna
- Municipal unit: Gortyna

Population (2021)
  - Community: 252
- Time zone: UTC+2 (EET)
  - Summer (DST): UTC+3 (EEST)

Miamou (Greek: Μιαμού) is a mountain village and a community in Greece (elevation 353 metres) 60 km south of Heraklion, on the south of Crete. It belongs to the municipality of Gortyn. The community, which includes the villages Lentas, Dyskos, Krotos and Papadogiannis, had 252 inhabitants (2021). The Libyan Sea is 4 km to the south.

== History ==
Miamou was first inhabited during the end of the Neolithic period. The name Miamou comes from the Greek word mia which means "one" (Greek: μία) and the Greek word omou which means "team" (Greek: Ομού). The name of Miamou possibly derives from folklore tradition. It is said that during the Middle Ages there was an epidemic which forced several villagers to abandon their settlements and go to the village which was not affected by it. That village is now called Miamou. In 1583, it had 204 inhabitants (Kastrofylakas, vol. 12, pg. 103) and was known as Miamú.
