= Climate change in Greece =

The climate of Greece is changing by way of increased drought, flooding, wildfires and sea level rise. These extreme weather conditions are likely to become more frequent and as a result landscapes and biodiversity will be affected. Climate change will also cause human activities such as land-use change, urbanisation and soil degradation to further affect Greek's ecosystems. Ecosystems in Greece are already at their tipping point, close to their environmental limits. Policies and laws have been put in place by the Greek government to try to manage these issues.

== Greenhouse gas emissions ==
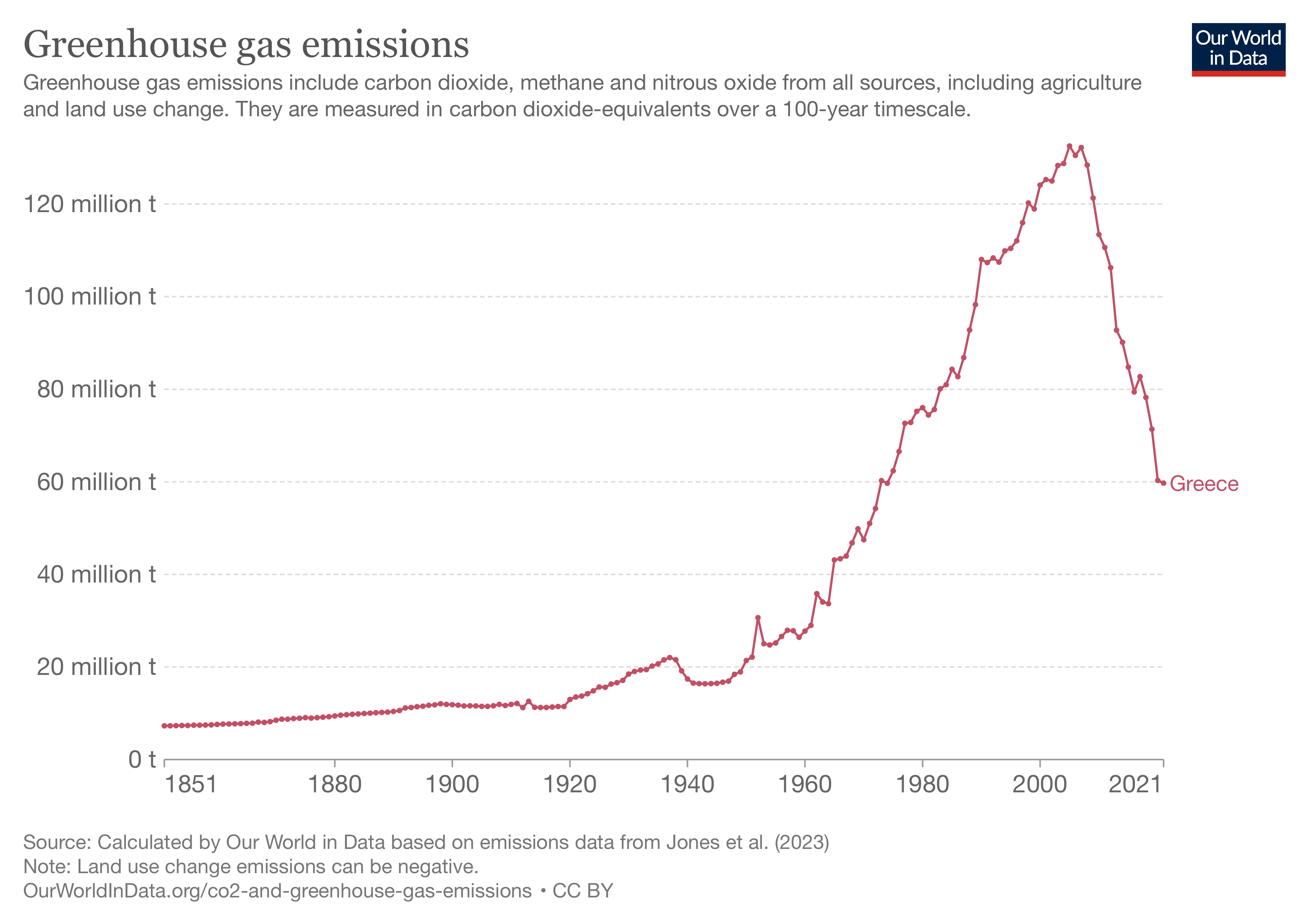
Total GHG emissions from 1851 to 2021 in Greece.

In 2021, Greece contributed 59.73 million tonnes of carbon dioxide equivalent greenhouse gas (GHG) emissions. From 2005 to 2021, the per capita carbon dioxide equivalent greenhouse gas (GHG) emissions coming from Greece decreased dramatically. In 2005, Greece hit their record high for GHG emissions, at 132.57 tonnes. Since then, the GHG emissions per capita more than halved. Greece's emissions per capita decreased at a faster rate than the overall EU per capita emissions from 2005 to 2015.

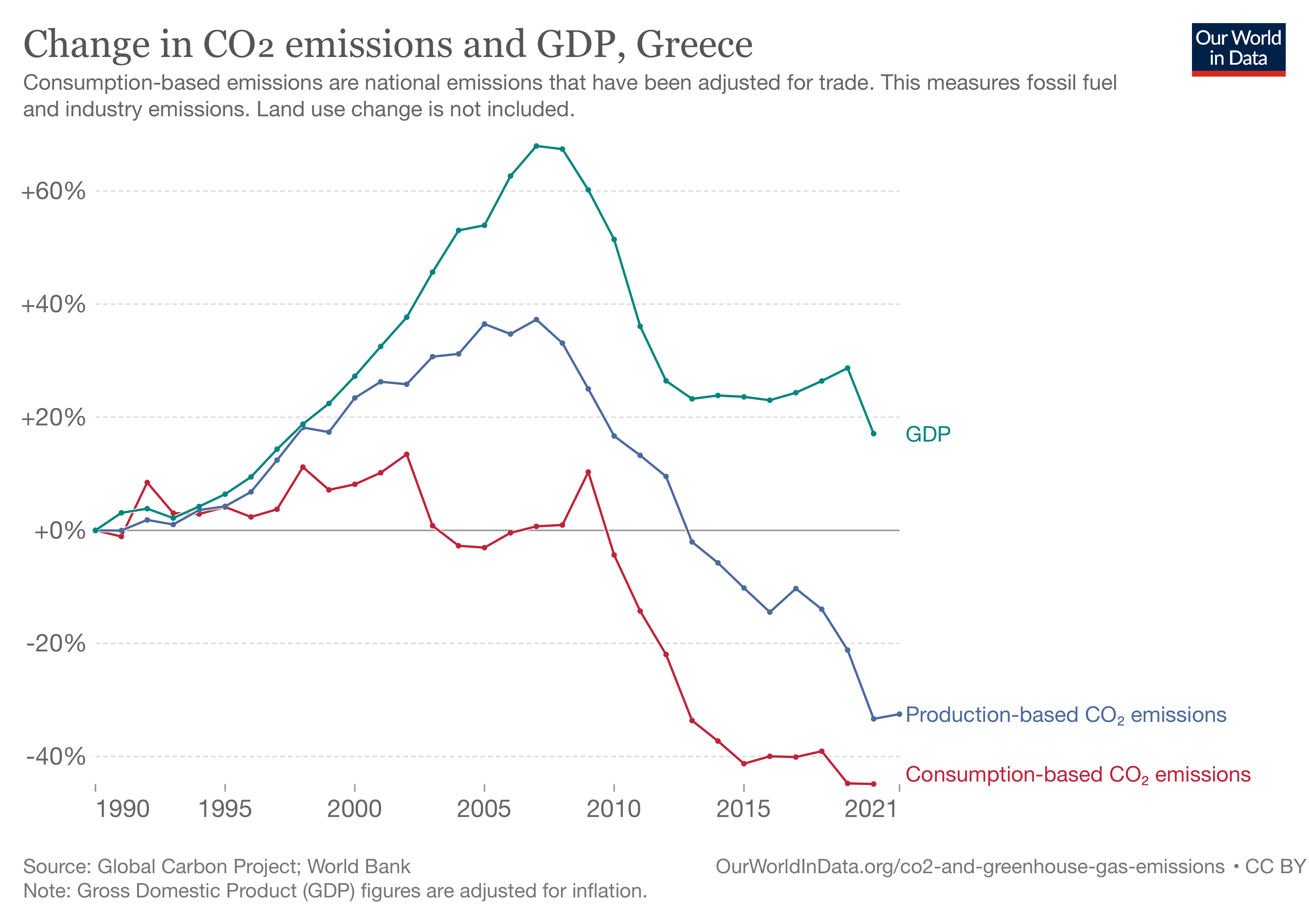
Greece's GDP growth in correlation with Greece's CO_{2} emissions.

The largest contributor to the GHG emissions in Greece is carbon dioxide (CO_{2}), followed by nitrous oxide (N_{2}O) and methane (CH_{4}). In 2021, CO_{2} emissions accounted for almost 95% of all of Greece's GHG emissions, at 56.31 million tonnes. In comparison to global emission levels, Greece emits 0.15% of the world's CO_{2} emissions whereas China, the highest contributor, emits 14.36%, as of 2021.

It has also been found that Greece's CO_{2} emissions are coupled with economic growth, so when Greece's CO_{2} emissions drop, so does the GDP. Greece is working towards decoupling their GDP growth with their emissions, as several other countries have done successfully in the past.

=== By sector ===
On the individual level, the per capita GHG emissions in Greece as of 2021 was 5.93 tonnes. By sector, the top three sources of GHG emissions include electricity and heat, transportation, and aviation and shipping.

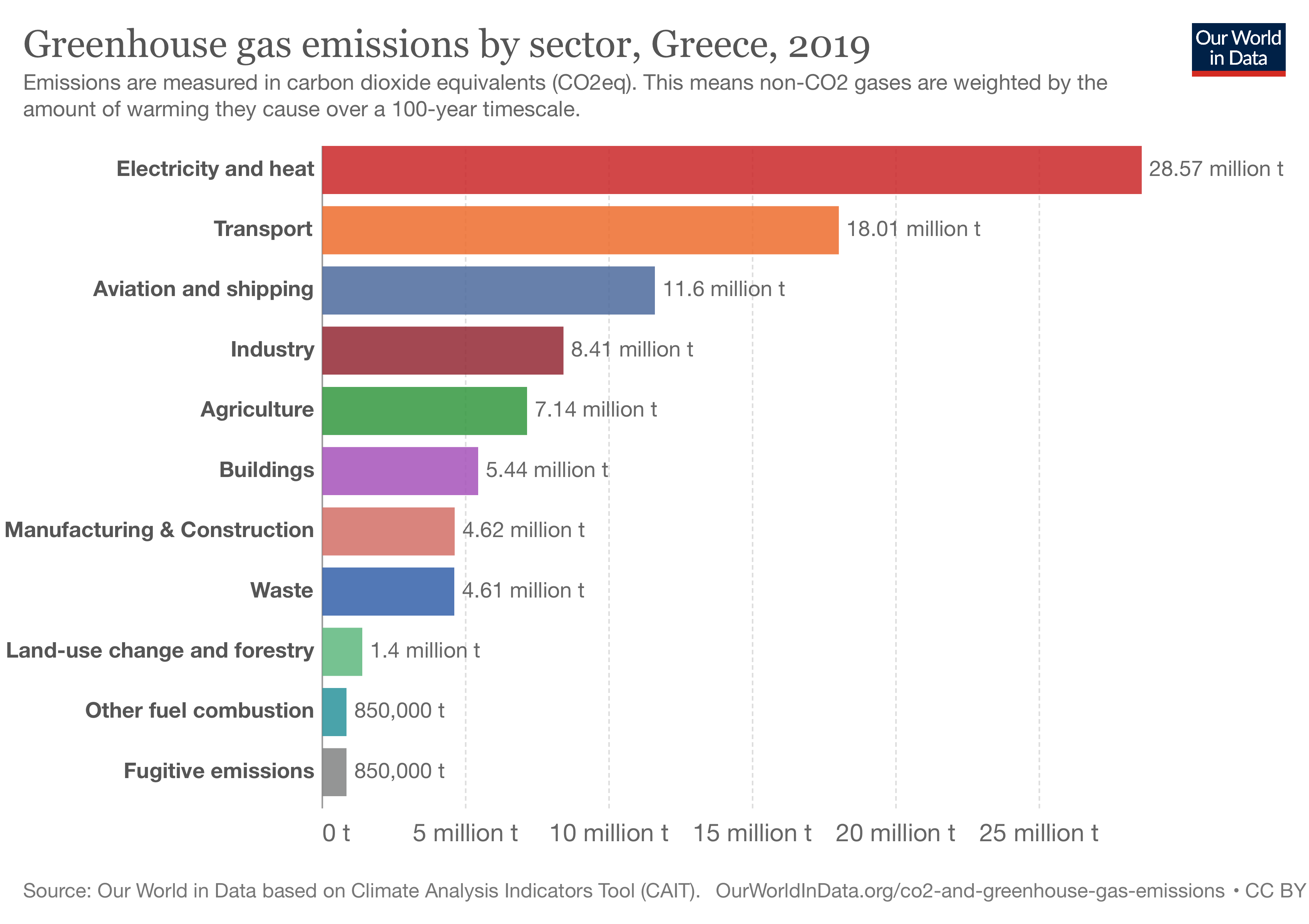
Different sectors in Greece and how much each contributes to Greece's GHG emissions

In most total energy consumption measurements, there are three components–heat, electricity, and transport. Those three components make up the largest sector releasing GHG emissions from 1990-2019 in Greece.

==== Electricity and heat ====
From 1990-2019, Greece's largest sector releasing GHG emissions was electricity and heat. In 2022, Greece consumed 52.44 terawatt hours of energy. These emissions are mainly made up of CO_{2} emissions. These emissions occur due to the burning of fossil fuels, such as coal, oil, and natural gases, for energy production. In 2021, it was found that 79.84% of Greece's energy comes from fossil fuels, and of that, over half comes from oil.

However, 19.39% of Greece's energy also comes from renewable energy sources, as of 2021. From 2007 to 2021, the share of primary energy coming from renewable sources increased by over 15%.

As of 2022, 56.69% of electricity production in Greece comes from fossil fuels. That means that 43.31% of electricity production comes from renewable energy technologies. Another way to reduce CO_{2} emissions and increase of air pollution would be to transition electricity towards another low-carbon source such as nuclear energy. However, Greece has not explored that energy option yet.

One of the larger obstacles to overcome when transitioning to renewable energy sources is the dilemma of the non-interconnected Greek Islands(NII). Currently, they obtain their electricity mainly from inefficient diesel generators. On average, electricity production cost in the NII is 2.5 times higher than in areas connected to a main electricity grid. Due to tourist seasonal demand, absence of storage space, and technical restrictions because of solar and wind's high chance of variability, installing renewable energy becomes increasingly more difficult on the NII. Thus, during the decade of 2021 to 2030, these islands are working to become interconnected with the mainland electricity system, reducing the need for oil imports. In June 2021, the power link between the mainland and the islands of Crete was completed. These connectivity offers a two benefits for the NII, as cheaper electricity can be supplied to the islands, and more renewables can be built because the interconnection allows for the balancing of energy amounts due to variable generation and varying demand.

==== Transport (incl. aviation and shipping) ====
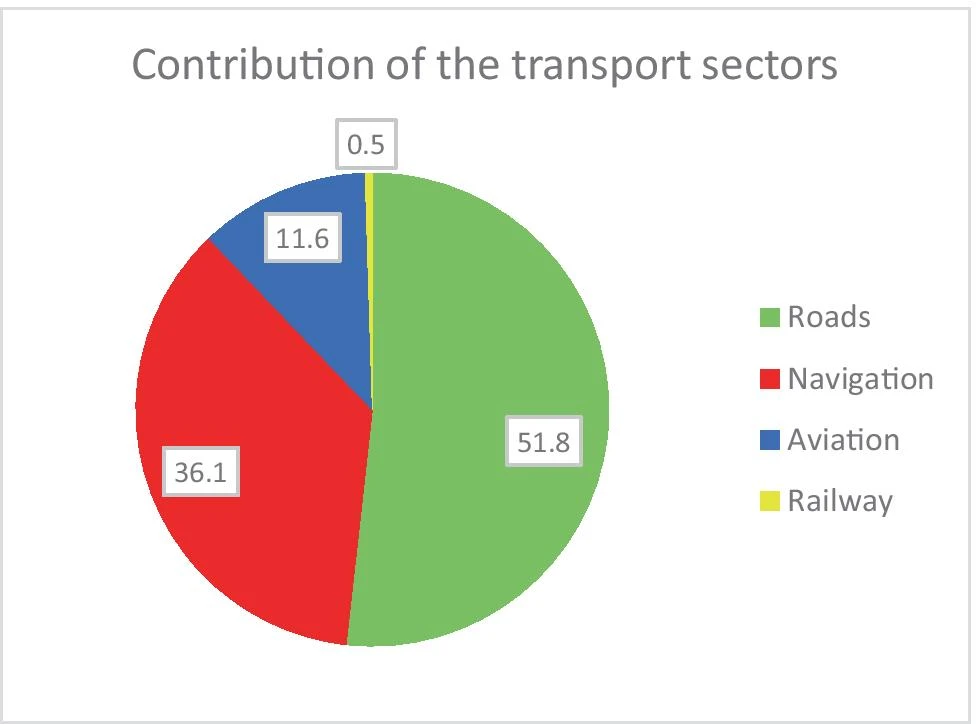
Contribution of CO_{2}-equivalent emissions from different transport sectors in Greece.

During the touristic periods of the year in Greece, which falls from May to August, emissions from transportation such as ships, cars, and airplanes are at their highest, which is becoming more and more evident in popular tourist destinations such as in the Mediterranean area.

In 2017, the road transport CO_{2}-equivalent emissions accounted for 22.6% of Greece's total emissions. In terms of Greece's transport specific emissions in 2017, road transport accounted for 51.8% of total CO_{2}-equivalent emissions. Between the year 1990 and the year 2017, the road sector's CO_{2}-equivalent emissions increased by almost 25%, from 12,000 to almost 15,000 kilo-tonnes (kt). Greece is also one of the countries with the oldest fleet of cars within the EU, with an average vehicle age of 13.5 years in 2015. These older cars contribute more to emissions than newer models due to the new models' low-emission technology and alternative fuels that can be utilized.

GHG emissions from aviation and shipping are also of increasing importance due to the global rise in domestic and international flights as well as sea cruises and traditional commercial navigation. In 2017, aviation contributed 11.6% of Greece's CO_{2}-equivalent transport emissions. All airlines flying in and out of Greece abide by the EU emissions trading systems (EU ETS), in which they are required to document and report their emissions to the EU and can buy certain levels of emission allowances, all of amount to a cap that the EU sets on how much CO_{2} can be emitted in a single year. Companies can then trade for higher or lower emission allowances. So far, this system has helped reduce the aviation sector's carbon footprint by over 17 million tonnes per year. In comparison, in 2017, navigation contributed up to 36.1% of Greece's CO_{2}-equivalent transport emissions. This section of transportation has been less regulated than road and aviation, but in 2018, the European Commission did make an amendment to the EU ETS to emphasize the need to take action to reduce emissions from shipping.

== Impacts on natural landscape ==
Köppen climate classification map for Greece for 1980–2016

2071–2100 map under the most intense climate change scenario. Mid-range scenarios are currently considered more likely

=== Temperature rise ===
Since the 1960s, Greece's average annual temperature has been rising. In addition, from 2000 to 2020, Greece's average annual temperature increase was 0.047°C, which is 0.011°C above the global average. Assuming the amount of global GHG emissions remain high, temperature increases in summer and autumn are produced to be higher than in spring, with the mainland regions experiencing more warming than the islands in all seasons except in autumn.

These temperature rises pose a threat to electricity supply, as the increased heat will put stress on thermal power plants, reducing the efficiency and increasing the need for cooling water. The population of Greece will be more likely to demand more electricity for air conditioning during extreme heat events which may result in power outages as seen in 2017 and 2020.

=== Extreme weather events ===
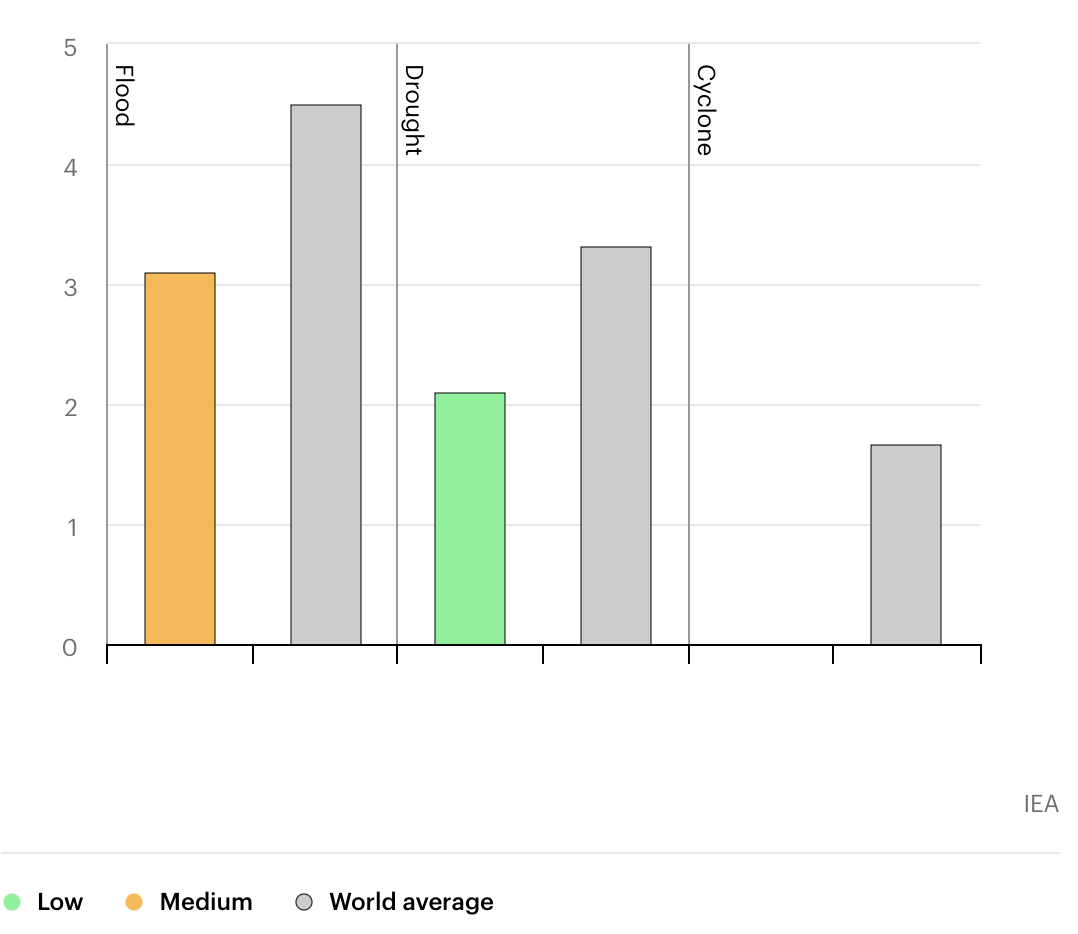
Level of floods, drought and tropical cyclones in Greece, 2000-2020

==== Fire ====
Most Greek forests are fire-adapted, however increase in fire due to climate change threatens the natural equilibrium of the ecosystem. Fire in Greek forests are natural, with most plants being fire-adapted and are a determining factor in the development of the Greek ecosystems. With rising temperatures, fires in Greece will become more common and severe, above the natural standard, leading to long-lasting damage. Climate change is furthering the likelihood of forest fires due to rising air temperatures, land use changes and lack of rainfall. There have been changes in the reduction of time between successive fires and the time of the fire season. The region is now seeing a longer fire season with higher frequency and intensity.

The fire season is expected to rise by 15% and 70%, with a drop of 10% to 30% days of rainfall. This, alongside increased chance of heatwaves will further cause disruption to the Greek forests, affecting the ecosystems.

==== Heat waves ====
By the year 2050 it is expected that Greece will be hit by 15-20 heatwaves in a year. A heatwave is defined as a day where the temperature becomes higher than the 90th percentile of temperatures for the region. This will contribute to 'Urban Heat Islands', causing areas in cities to have a difference in an estimated 8 to 10 degrees. This is due a lack of green areas and poor ventilation. Thus, Greek cities will feel extra pressure during climate change than rural areas. During the period of 1971-2000 the average number of heatwaves was 1.4, and this is expected to rise to an average of 6 over the next 25 years.

=== Sea level rise ===
The coastal zone of Greece is 18,400km in length for the mainland and 9,835km for the islands. The population among the coast is high, with 33% of the Greek population inhabiting coastal areas 1-2 km from the coast and 85% living 50km from the coast. The coastal zone provides for valuable goods and services from the natural resources. This area is highly productive for the economic activity of Greece with 80% of industrial activities, 90% of tourism and 35% of agriculture occurring in the coastal zones. Coastal erosion caused by sea level rise is a significant issue for Greece.

Greece is under threat from coastal erosion, being the 4th most vulnerable country in Europe with over 20% of Greece's coastline under threat (EUROSION, 2004). There is heightened vulnerability of this coastal erosion due to sea level rise. The impact of sea level rise will occur by inundation and erosion. The southern part of Greece will be more vulnerable to these impacts than the northern side due to the geography of the area. Beach erosion will be damaging to Greek beaches as the beaches are vulnerable due to their small size, climatic characteristics and the negative sediment budgets. In the Mediterranean Sea, studies are indicating a sea-level rise of 1.1 – 1.3 mm/yr. By the end of the century it is estimated that there will be a coastal retreat of more than 280m. In 1990 United Nations Environment Programme warned of these impacts stating that 'it is likely that the impact of climate change will first be felt in the Mediterranean water resource system'.

Sustainability of the beach tourism sector will be challenged; the increasing erosion and inundation will cause the carrying-capacity of these highly populous beaches to become sensitive. Not only will the tourism sector be affected, but so will the economies that rely on the coast such as agriculture. Estimates for the cost of sea level rise show a cost of 24.9 billion for a 0.5m rise and 265.2 billion for a 1m rise in the sea level.

=== Terrestrial ecosystems ===
Greece has one of the most biodiverse regions in the Earth, being a biodiversity hot spot. Greece is home to 22% of the biodiverse Mediterranean species and is home to 25 times more species than its landmass would suggest it could have. Greece's position in the Mediterranean basin is reason as to why the country has extremely high levels of biodiversity. An increase of 3.6 in the global temperature could cause a loss of over 50% of plant species in the Mediterranean.

However, Greece's position in the Mediterranean basin also make it one of the most vulnerable countries to climate change. Climate change has been steadily occurring in Greece for the last century with winters and summers slowly warming. Temperatures have been increasing, but the precipitation of the area has been slowly decreasing.

The Greek forests have many drought-tolerant tree species and so it has been thought that these trees would be favoured with the proposed increase in temperatures. However, a severe drought in eastern Greece killed many of the drought-tolerant Mediterranean pines. The increase in temperatures will affect how the disturbances of insect and pathogen outbreaks occur.

The bark beetle, which is of high abundance in the Parnitha National Park and Mount Taygetos, is known for causing the death of millions of Firtrees. The impact of climate change on these beetles will result in the expansion of these beetles. This expansion alongside the forest's susceptibility to disease is likely to result in more outbreaks. Changes in temperature and precipitation will allow the bark beetles to thrive in increased drought conditions, while increasing the trees susceptibility to being infested by the beetles. Droughts weaken tree vigour which leads to infections by diseases and / or heightened exposure to fires. Heightened insect infections alongside heightened susceptibility to fire promotes fuel leading to devastating effects of Greece's biodiverse forests.

=== Marine ecosystems ===
As of 2016, over 84% of Europe's aquaculture production comes from marine life that are farmed at sea, which are subject to the environmental conditions that are outside of human control. One of these farming locations is the Mediterranean Sea which surrounds Greece's mainland and all its islands. Aquaculture in the Mediterranean is important due to the overfishing that has occurred in the areas for several decades. More specifically, coastal hake, sole, and red mullet natural fisheries have been severely overexploited.

The most common Mediterranean aquaculture practice is marine cage farming, and 95% of the total production is made up of European seabass and gilthead seabream. Greece is the main EU producer for these two species of fish, with annual production exceeding 135,000 ton, accounting for 60% of the EU supply and 24% of the global supply. This industry is very significant towards Greece's economic wellbeing.

Due to low water exchange with large oceans and the unique nature of the Mediterranean Basin surrounding the sea, it is one of the areas that is highly affected by climate change. In Mediterranean sea, temperatures are increasing 20% faster than the global average. Increased temperatures due to climate change have been associated with changes in fish age at maturity, time of reproduction, and growth. At the individual level, fish may actually benefit from warmer temperatures in terms of reaching commercial sizes faster due to faster growth. However, at the population level, the increase of extreme weather events, such as floods, cyclones, and windstorms, could largely offset the benefits caused by the faster rate of growth. Regardless of the increased growth due to warmer temperatures, warm-water fish species are expected to perform range shifts and move northwards, and cold-water fish species will decline.

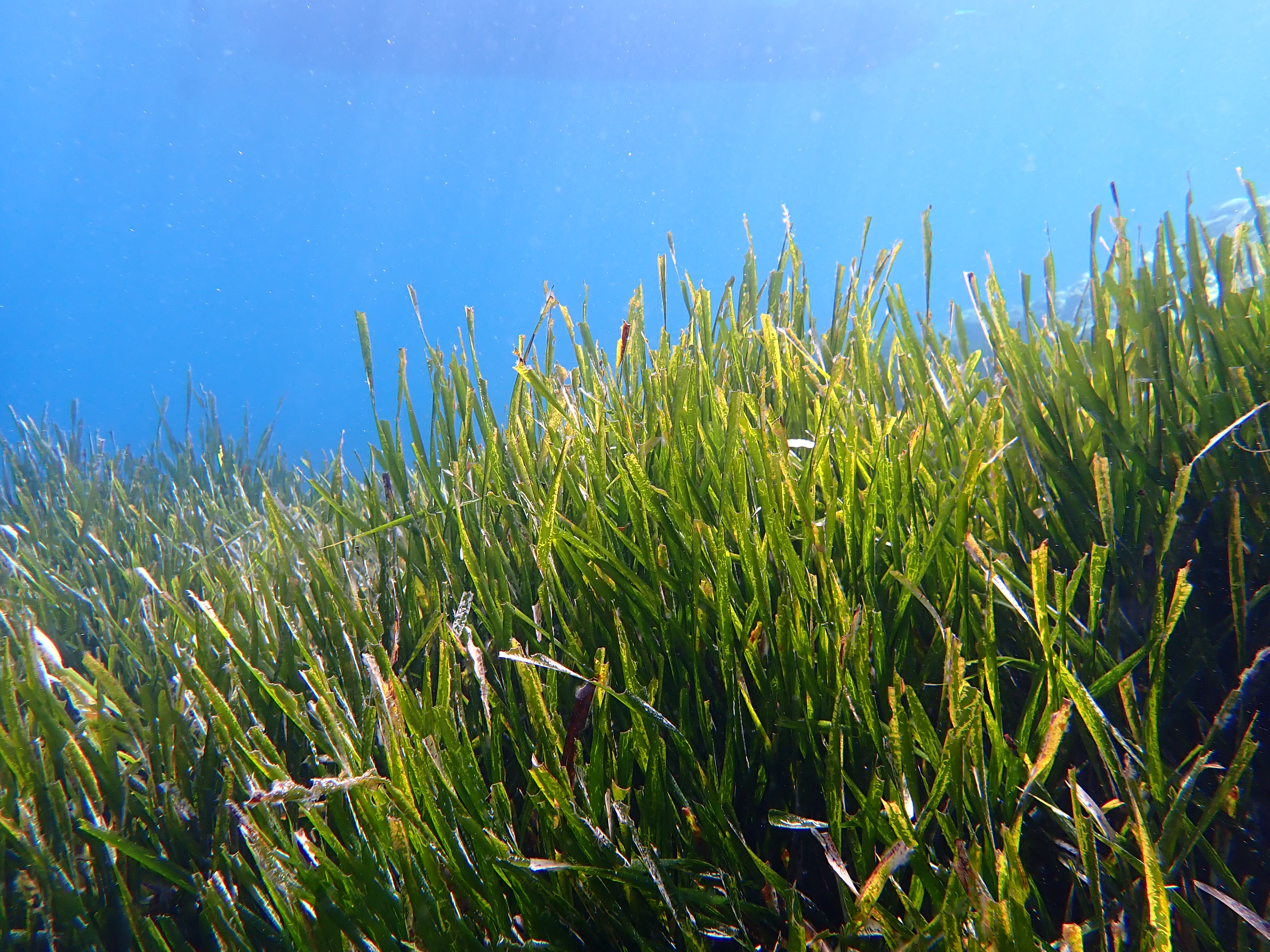
Image of posidonia oceanica.

Another aspect of the Mediterranean Sea marine life at risk includes species that act as carbon sinks such as posidonia oceanica, a type of seagrass that provides many benefits to the marine ecosystem. Posidonia meadows are estimated to store between 11-42% of the total CO_{2} emissions from the Mediterranean Basin since the Industrial Revolution. Posidonia oxygenates the ocean and provides a habitat for 20% of marine species in the Mediterranean. As storms and hurricanes become more frequent and severe, fields of posidonia reduce the power of the waves and currents, and in autumn, the dead leaves float up to the surface and protect again coastal erosion. However, climate change is causing a serious decline in the posidonia species. Due to increasing temperatures, posidonia is under stress and is changing its distribution in ocean waters. These higher temperatures also attract invasive algae species and herbivorous fish, which can leave posidonia meadows completely barren. The rising sea levels can negatively affect this species as well, causing a regression due to less light reaching the meadows for photosynthesis. The decline in this species creates a vicious cycle because as the meadows die due to warmer temperatures, the carbon they hold is exposed, releasing CO_{2} into the atmosphere and continues to fuel global warming.

Heat waves will likely cause mass mortality events of species lower on the food chain such as invertebrate organisms. Increased levels of CO_{2} in the water will also decrease calcium carbonate levels, which in turn will negatively affect the skeletal growth of key marine species, such as coral. Since these species are at the bottom of the food chain, their decline could greatly affect those higher up on the food chain who are depending on it.

== Impact on people ==
=== Agriculture ===
The agriculture sector in Greece accounts for 13% of the labour force in Greece, with one-third of exports in Greece being from agricultural products. Climate change is set to increase the mean average temperature leading to a positive increase in the number of hotter days and nights and frost days to decrease.

However, the entire agriculture sector as a whole is not expected to be entirely affected negatively by climate change. The extension of the growing season due to increased temperatures will allow further cultivation of certain crops. This will give certain crops the opportunity to expand, for example the cotton plantations as increased temperature will benefit their growth. Greece is one of the biggest cotton producers in Europe. Greece accounts for almost 80% of the European Union's total cotton production. Climate change is set to reduce the water balance of the Mediterranean region and lead to a higher chance of climatic events. These weather changes will lead cotton ball retention being curtailed. The rise of CO_{2} in the atmosphere due to climate change will lead to more fruiting structures and cotton bolls (i.e. more CO_{2} equals more plant growth), however other climatic variables such as droughts will negatively impact productivity overall.

Olives are important products in the agricultural sector in Greece. The olive tree is one of the most cultivated tree species in the Mediterranean region. Greece, as a country in the Mediterranean biome, is of a Temperate climate. This means that plant species require certain chill requirements to achieve regular crop yields. The olive tree is very resistant to drought, hence why it thrives in Greece. However because the winter will be more warm, there will be a lack of cold temperatures necessary for the olive trees to bloom. The olive tree is affected by temperature changes, flowering begins in the summer, then the colder conditions of the winter begins the dormancy phase. Post dormancy the olive tree must be exposed to higher temperatures to break its dormancy and activate the shoot growth. Without an adequate chilling phase, the quantity and quality of the flowering on the olive tree is negatively affected which will affect olive production. Climate change will have impacts on the growth of olive trees and subsequently affect the economy surrounding it.

=== Tourism ===
One of the most popular tourist destinations in Greece, Santorini, is set to experience a deterioration of optimal thermal comfort conditions. While the Mediterranean area is extremely popular with tourists, the area is also subject to be very vulnerable to climate change. The Greek islands typically has very favourable weather conditions with warm temperatures and sunny weather. However, studies are indicating that thermal comfort-based temperature may decrease in the summer period, but increase in spring, autumn and winter, which may alter the tourism industry. These studies have shown that there will be shifts into hot extreme weather in summer alongside an elongation of the warm and hot season. The days of discomfort due to extreme temperatures is set to increase most significantly in the coastal regions and islands. Based on the Tourism Climate Index is set to change to just acceptable conditions in the near future. With this deterioration of ideal days, the tourism sector can expect a redistribution in the tourism traffic during the current high season to earlier and later (shifting to spring and autumn). While the summer period may see a decrease in tourism, the elongation of ideal climate and the shift of it into spring, autumn and winter may actually increase the overall tourism in Greece.

The Mediterranean region is one of the most visited regions in the world, attracting 214.9 million tourists or 19% of tourism worldwide (UNWTO Tourism Highlights 2015). Greece combined with Spain and Turkey attracts 60% of the tourists worldwide. This makes the tourism industry of Greece susceptible to the vulnerability that climate change causes. The impacts of increasing temperatures on economies is therefore larger on Greece compared to other European countries. A decrease in tourism could also be expected due to the fact that climate "defines the length and quality of tourism seasons, affects tourism operations, and influences environmental conditions that both attract and deter visitors".

== Mitigation and adaptation ==
=== International commitments ===
==== Timeline of international conventions ====
In the order that Greece became a party to the convention or protocol, regardless of whether the convention or protocol had entered into force yet:

- 1975: Ramsar Convention on Wetlands
- 1988: Vienna Convention for the Protection of the Ozone Layer
- 1994: United Nations Framework Convention on Climate Change
- 1994: Basel Convention on the Control of Transboundary Movements of Hazardous Wastes and their Disposal
- 1995: Montreal Protocol on Substances that Deplete the Ozone Layer
- 1997: United Nations Convention to Combat Desertification
- 2002: Kyoto Protocol
- 2003: Rotterdam Convention on the Prior Informed Consent Procedure for Certain Hazardous Chemicals and Pesticides in International Trade
- 2004: Cartagena Protocol on Biosafety
- 2006: Stockholm Convention on Persistent Organic Pollutants
- 2016: Paris Agreement

==== Rio Convention ====
In 1992, the United Nations Framework Convention on Climate Change was adopted and opened for signature in Rio de Janeiro at the Rio Convention. This convention served as the first large scale agreement between signing countries and the UN to reduce the impact that climate change was predicted to have globally. Greece signed this convention in 1992 and ratified it in 1994, adopting the 1st National Programme for Climate Change in 1995. This program took into account both economic and social parameters and set a restriction for Greece to reduce their contribution to the increase of greenhouse gas emissions, mainly CO_{2}, N_{2}O and CH_{4}, by 15% by 2000.

In 2002, Greece adopted the 2nd National Programme for Climate Change, which added measures for Greece to meet the goal set by the Kyoto Protocol by setting restrictions on 3 more greenhouse gasses, hydrofluorocarbons (HFC), perfluorochemicals (PFC), and sulfur hexafluoride (SF_{6}). Greece was tasked with reducing their emissions from these 3 gasses, along with the three gasses from the 1st program, by 25%. The 2nd National Programme also expressed Greece's need to develop appropriate infrastructure to handle energy by natural gas and to further explore renewable energy sources that were able to be implemented.

==== Kyoto Protocol ====
The Kyoto Protocol was created in 1997, but wasn't fully ratified and put into motion until 2005. It is an agreement to follow the United Nations Framework Convention on Climate Change by setting goals for industrialized countries to limit their greenhouse gas emissions and reduce global warming. Industrialized countries are labeled as Annex 1 countries, whereas all other countries in the treaty are labeled as Non-Annex 1, and they are only required to report their emissions but not set to any limitations. Greece was categorized as an Annex 1 country. Greece ratified the protocol in 2002. By 2005, 192 countries ratified the agreement, and the protocol entered into force.

Countries could primarily use national measures to achieve their individual emissions target amount. However, a key part of the Kyoto Protocol was the introduction of market mechanisms based on the principle of trading emissions permits.

There have been two commitment periods of the Kyoto Protocol, one spanning from 2008 to 2012, and one spanning from 2013 to 2020.

==== Paris Agreement ====
The Paris Agreement is an international accord with the goal of significantly reducing GHG emissions to limit global temperature increase to 2°C, with a more ambitious goal to limit global temperature increase by 1.5°C. While the Kyoto Protocol is still technically in effect, the Paris Agreement has superseded the Kyoto Protocol as the main treaty guiding the global response to climate change.

This agreement requires member countries to annually send in their national climate plans, otherwise known as nationally determined contributions (NDCs), with every new NDC reflecting a higher level of change and emission reduction than the previous year. This allows countries to take action on their own accord in response to climate change as opposed to the Kyoto Protocol, which enforced limitations. NDCs are not legally binding, meaning that countries don't have to achieve every action in their NDC.

=== Domestic initiatives ===
Climate change legislation in Greece has been harmonised alongside relevant EU directives to ensure the country is aiming for similar changes to emission. The National Energy and Climate (ENCP) Plan is a ten-year plan that has been mandated by the European member states. The aim is for Europe to meet its overall greenhouse gases emissions targets. This plan targets carbon emissions, energy efficiency, energy security and innovation. As party to this Plan, Greece has introduced policies and laws to ensure the target of the plan will be meet.

==== National Strategy for Adaptation to Climate Change ====
The Greek National Adaptation Strategy (NAS) was finalised in April 2016 and was formally endorsed by the Parliament in August 2016. It is currently in its 10-year implementation horizon, to be followed by a review. The NAS is the principal document that defines goals, principles and priorities for climate adaption in Greece. This policy plan lists the potential adaptation measures for all sectors in Greece that are expected to be significantly affected by change. It is a strategic document, providing guidance in climate change adaptation. The NAS was developed in 13 Regional Adaptation Action Plans (RAAPs), each form including potential adaption measures at a regional level.

The Ministry of Environment and Energy (MEEN) is the competent authority to draft the NAS, the group that oversees and revises the strategies. The National Climate Change Adaptation Committee (NCCAC) has representatives from different areas of government, forming a group that develops and supports adapting policies. This committee group is the advisory to the MEEN.

==== National Climate Law ====
The National Climate Law of Greece was introduced in May 2022 and sets a long-term goal of the gradual transition of Greece to carbon neutrality by the year 2050. The goal is to achieve this in the most environmentally sustainable way possible. The law defines climate neutrality as the balance of anthropogenic greenhouse gas emissions from their sources and their absorptions by carbon sinks. This National Law intervenes with other legislative measures in the country to ensure the goal is meet. This is done by drafting and adopting the national strategy into regional plans. Further by establishing government institutions for a smooth transition towards climate neutrality, focusing on the establishment of a carbon budgeting mechanism. Lastly the goal is to be achieved by creating policies and measures that aim to mitigate emissions from high emission sectors such as building, transport and business.

The immediate objects are set to recede the net anthropogenic greenhouse's emissions by at least:

- 55% by the year 2030
- 80% by the year 2040

==== Sectoral policies and measures ====
There are specific sectoral measures of the National Climate Law that have been introduced and will be introduced to achieve the goal of climate neutrality which are as follows:

- Electricity Production
- Zero-Emission Vehicles
- Municipal Emission Reduction Plans
- Reduction of Emissions from Buildings
- Environment Permits
- Reduction of Emissions from Installations
- Reduction of Emissions from Businesses
- Transition of Islands to Climate Neutrality

==== National Energy and Climate Change Plan ====
The National Energy and Climate Change Plan (NECP) is the plan for strategic goals to attain specific energy and climate objectives by 2030. This plan outlines Greece's priorities and aims to serve as a key tool in drawing up the national energy and climate policy in the next decade. The objectives are as follows:

- (a) Greenhouse gas emissions reduced by more than 42% compared to 1990 emissions and more than 56% compared to 2005 emissions
- (b) Renewable energy sources (RES) to be at a minimum share of 35%. Provision has been made for RES share in electricity consumption to exceed 60%
- (c) Final object for energy consumption in 2030 to be lower than recorded in 2017.

There are seven themes under which the NECP aims to attain its object. These seven themes are: (1) Climate change, emissions and removals of greenhouse gases, (2) Renewable energy sources, (3) Improvement in energy efficiency, (4) Security of energy supply, (5) Energy market, (6) Agriculture, shipping, tourism and (7) Research, innovation and competitiveness.

==== National Recovery and Resilience Plan ====
Developed after the COVID-19 pandemic, the recovery and resilience plan encourages investments that will help Greece throughout the green and digital transition. The plan has 106 investment initiatives, 68 reforms and will receive grants of €17.77 billion and €12.73 billion.

Greece and the European Investment Bank agreed to establish a €5 billion fund in September 2021 to support the nation's sustainable recovery and growth in accordance with Greece's National Recovery and Resilience Plan and is backed by resources from the Recovery and Resilience Facility. These include both governmental and private investments in urban revitalization, sustainable transport, energy efficiency and renewable energy, to support the green and digital transformation.
