= Xerokampos, Lasithi =

Xerokampos Ξερόκαμπος
- Community
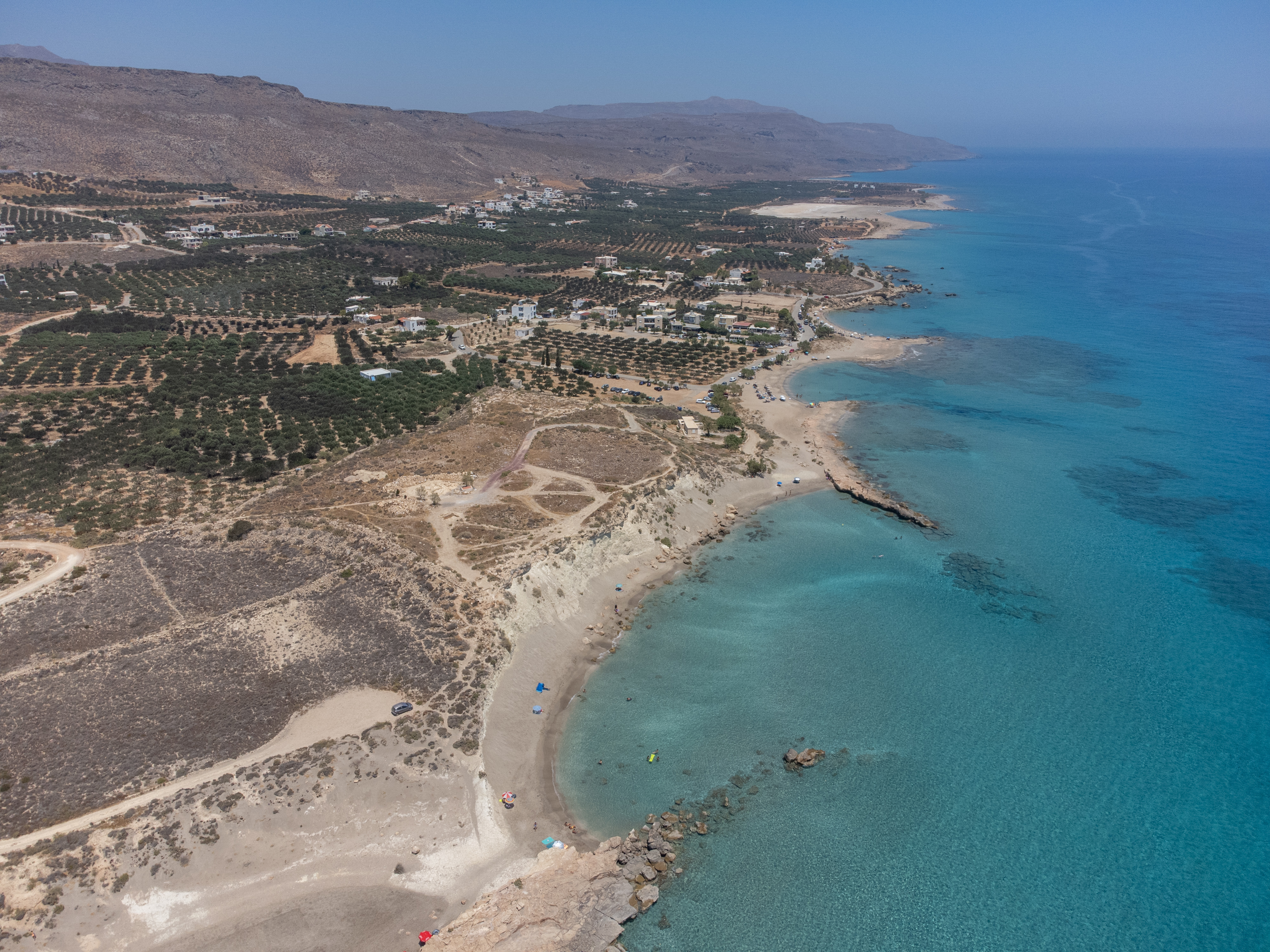
- Aerial view of Xerokampos

- Location within Greece
- Coordinates: 35°02′55″N 26°13′59″E
- Country: Greece
- Administrative region: Crete
- Regional unit: Lasithi
- Municipality: Sitia
- Municipal unit: Lefki

Population (2021)
  - Community: 83
- Time zone: UTC+2 (EET)
  - Summer (DST): UTC+3 (EEST)
- Postal code: 720 59
- Area code: 28430
- Vehicle registration: AN

Xerokampos (Greek: Ξερόκαμπος) is a coastal settlement in the municipality of Sitia, in the Lasithi regional unit on the southeastern coast of Crete, Greece. As of the 2021 census, it has a permanent population of 83 residents. The area is notable for its isolated, pristine beaches and its arid microclimate.

== Etymology ==
The extreme aridity of the region is reflected directly in the settlement's Greek toponym. In Greek, Xerokampos (Ξερόκαμπος) translates to "dry plain", derived from the words xeros (ξηρός), meaning "dry", and kampos (κάμπος), meaning "plain". This toponym describes the area's parched landscape and its hot, arid microclimate.

== Geography ==
Xerokampos is situated in the remote southeastern corner of Crete, in the Libyan Sea. The settlement is geographically isolated by the rugged mountains of Sitia and Thrypti to the north and west. This mountainous topography plays a crucial role in shaping the local environment, as it creates a strong rain shadow effect that blocks moisture-laden weather systems coming from the west and north.

== Climate ==
According to the Köppen climate classification, Xerokampos experiences a hot semi-arid climate (BSh), missing the hot desert climate (BWh) by around 10 mm. Xerokampos is also classified as a true desert according to the UNEP aridity index, as arid according to the De Martonne index, and as a subtropical desert scrub under the Holdridge life zones system. Furthermore, the Sitia UNESCO Global Geopark officially characterizes the adjacent protected zone as having a "semi-desert" climate that supports unique North African flora.

The settlement's location in the rain shadow of the surrounding mountains drastically reduces its annual rainfall. Meteorological data collected indicate an extremely low mean annual precipitation of approximately 219.0 mm, alongside a high mean annual temperature of 20.9 °C. These arid conditions make Xerokampos the driest area in Greece and according to Mariolopoulos (1938) the south east tip of Lasithi recorded a mean annual precipitation of only 207.1 mm (1915-1929) showing a Mediterranean desert climate. Xerokampos falls in 11a plant hardiness zone.

Climate data for Xerokampos 8 m a.s.l. Climate: Hot semi-arid climate (BSh) • USDA: 11a (5.64°C)
Month	Jan	Feb	Mar	Apr	May	Jun	Jul	Aug	Sep	Oct	Nov	Dec	Year
Record high °C (°F)	22.2 (72.0)	22.8 (73.0)	26.1 (79.0)	32.5 (90.5)	37.9 (100.2)	37.0 (98.6)	40.9 (105.6)	40.7 (105.3)	38.9 (102.0)	35.0 (95.0)	27.2 (81.0)	22.8 (73.0)	40.9 (105.6)
Mean daily maximum °C (°F)	16.6 (61.9)	16.2 (61.2)	17.2 (63.0)	20.3 (68.5)	24.6 (76.3)	28.8 (83.8)	31.8 (89.2)	30.9 (87.6)	28.8 (83.8)	25.0 (77.0)	21.6 (70.9)	18.4 (65.1)	23.4 (74.1)
Daily mean °C (°F)	14.5 (58.1)	14.0 (57.2)	14.9 (58.8)	17.7 (63.9)	21.6 (70.9)	25.7 (78.3)	28.8 (83.8)	28.5 (83.3)	26.4 (79.5)	22.7 (72.9)	19.5 (67.1)	16.5 (61.7)	20.9 (69.6)
Mean daily minimum °C (°F)	12.4 (54.3)	11.9 (53.4)	12.5 (54.5)	15.1 (59.2)	18.6 (65.5)	22.7 (72.9)	25.8 (78.4)	26.0 (78.8)	24.0 (75.2)	20.4 (68.7)	17.4 (63.3)	14.5 (58.1)	18.5 (65.3)
Record low °C (°F)	2.5 (36.5)	2.8 (37.0)	3.9 (39.0)	9.1 (48.4)	14.1 (57.4)	16.0 (60.8)	21.4 (70.5)	22.8 (73.0)	18.0 (64.4)	15.7 (60.3)	11.3 (52.3)	8.5 (47.3)	2.5 (36.5)
Average rainfall mm (inches)	49.0 (1.93)	39.2 (1.54)	29.6 (1.17)	7.6 (0.30)	5.4 (0.21)	5.5 (0.22)	0.3 (0.01)	0.7 (0.03)	2.6 (0.10)	21.6 (0.85)	18.5 (0.73)	39.5 (1.56)	219.5 (8.65)
Source: Xerokampos Davis station (Jan 2020– Mar 2026)

Climate data for Xerokampos (2004-2025 merged Oregon/Davis data)
Month	Jan	Feb	Mar	Apr	May	Jun	Jul	Aug	Sep	Oct	Nov	Dec	Year
Record high °C (°F)	27.0 (80.6)	27.8 (82.0)	31.0 (87.8)	36.0 (96.8)	37.9 (100.2)	45.0 (113.0)	43.0 (109.4)	43.0 (109.4)	41.0 (105.8)	38.0 (100.4)	34.0 (93.2)	30.0 (86.0)	45.0 (113.0)
Mean daily maximum °C (°F)	17.8 (64.0)	17.8 (64.0)	19.6 (67.3)	22.3 (72.1)	26.0 (78.8)	30.2 (86.4)	32.7 (90.9)	32.7 (90.9)	30.4 (86.7)	26.7 (80.1)	23.0 (73.4)	19.7 (67.5)	24.9 (76.8)
Daily mean °C (°F)	14.6 (58.3)	14.5 (58.1)	16.0 (60.8)	18.6 (65.5)	22.2 (72.0)	26.4 (79.5)	29.0 (84.2)	29.1 (84.4)	26.8 (80.2)	23.2 (73.8)	19.9 (67.8)	16.4 (61.5)	21.4 (70.5)
Mean daily minimum °C (°F)	11.3 (52.3)	11.3 (52.3)	12.5 (54.5)	14.9 (58.8)	18.4 (65.1)	22.7 (72.9)	25.3 (77.5)	25.6 (78.1)	23.2 (73.8)	19.8 (67.6)	16.7 (62.1)	13.2 (55.8)	17.9 (64.2)
Record low °C (°F)	2.5 (36.5)	1.9 (35.4)	3.1 (37.6)	8.3 (46.9)	13.0 (55.4)	16.4 (61.5)	19.9 (67.8)	21.5 (70.7)	16.6 (61.9)	12.3 (54.1)	7.0 (44.6)	4.0 (39.2)	1.9 (35.4)
Source: Xerokampos Oregon/Davis station (Jan 2004– Dec 2025)
