= Diapori chain =

Chain of islands in Greece

The Diapori chain is a chain of three uninhabited islands in the Argosaronikos Gulf of Greece. It includes St John's Island (Ayios Ioannis) in the north, Diapori Island (Tragonisi; not to be confused with Diapori, Lemnos) in the south, and St. Thomas Island (300 acres) (Ayios Thomas) in the middle. All are currently being offered for private sale.
