= Argo-Saronic Gulf =

Saronic Gulf and Argolic Gulf of Greece

- Αργοσαρωνικός Κόλπος (Greek)
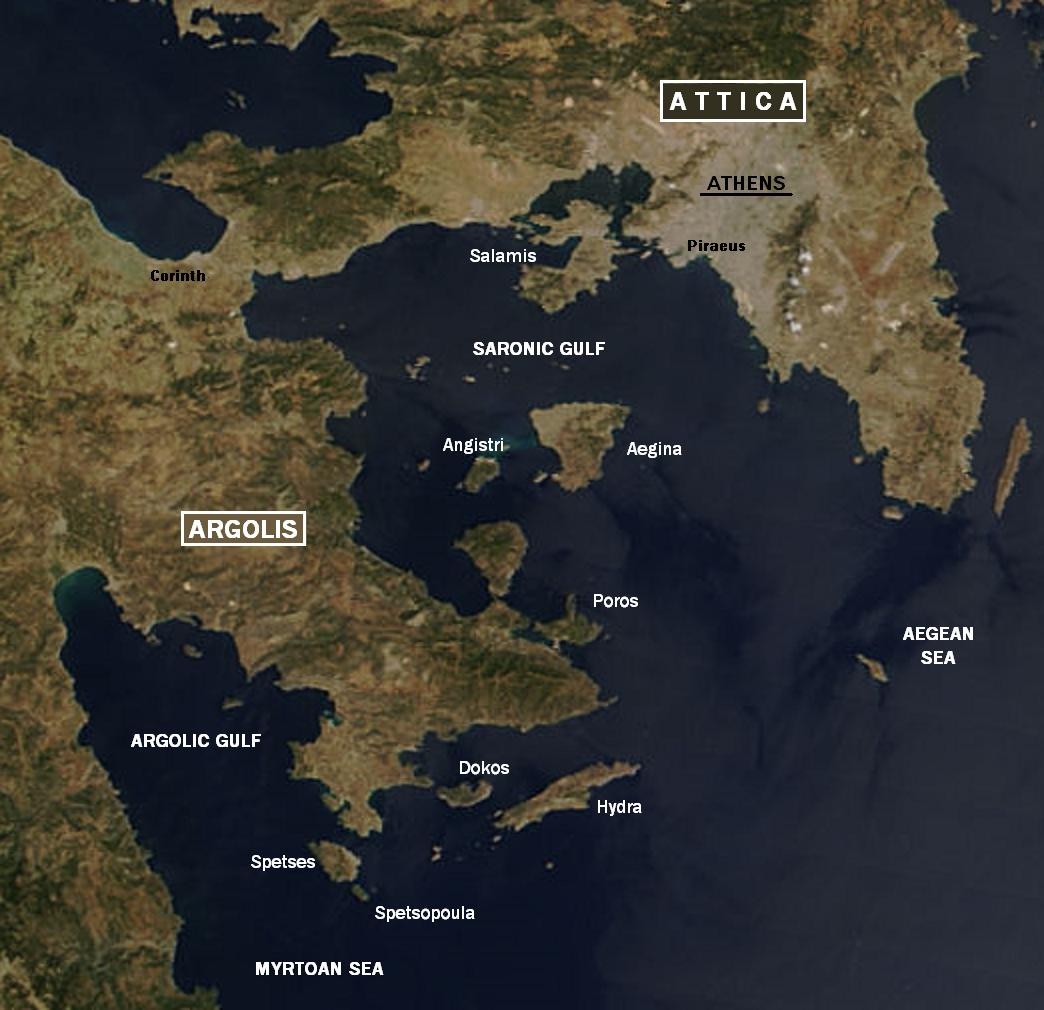
- The location of the Argo-Saronic Gulf
- Interactive map of Argo-Saronic Gulf
- Type: Gulf
- Etymology: Argolic Gulf + Saronic Gulf
- Part of: Aegean Sea
- Ocean/sea sources: Mediterranean Sea

Argo-Saronic Gulf (Greek: Αργοσαρωνικός Κόλπος) is a term used to combine the adjacent Saronic Gulf and Argolic Gulf of Greece. It contains the Argo-Saronic Islands, the Diapori chain and is located in the Attica region of Greece.
