= Psari Forada =

Psari Forada Ψαρή Φοράδα
- Settlement
- Location within Greece
- Country: Greece
- Administrative region: Crete
- Regional unit: Heraklion
- Municipality: Viannos
- Community: Kalami
- Elevation: 40 m (130 ft)

Population (2021)
  - Total: 95
- Time zone: UTC+2 (EET)
  - Summer (DST): UTC+3 (EEST)

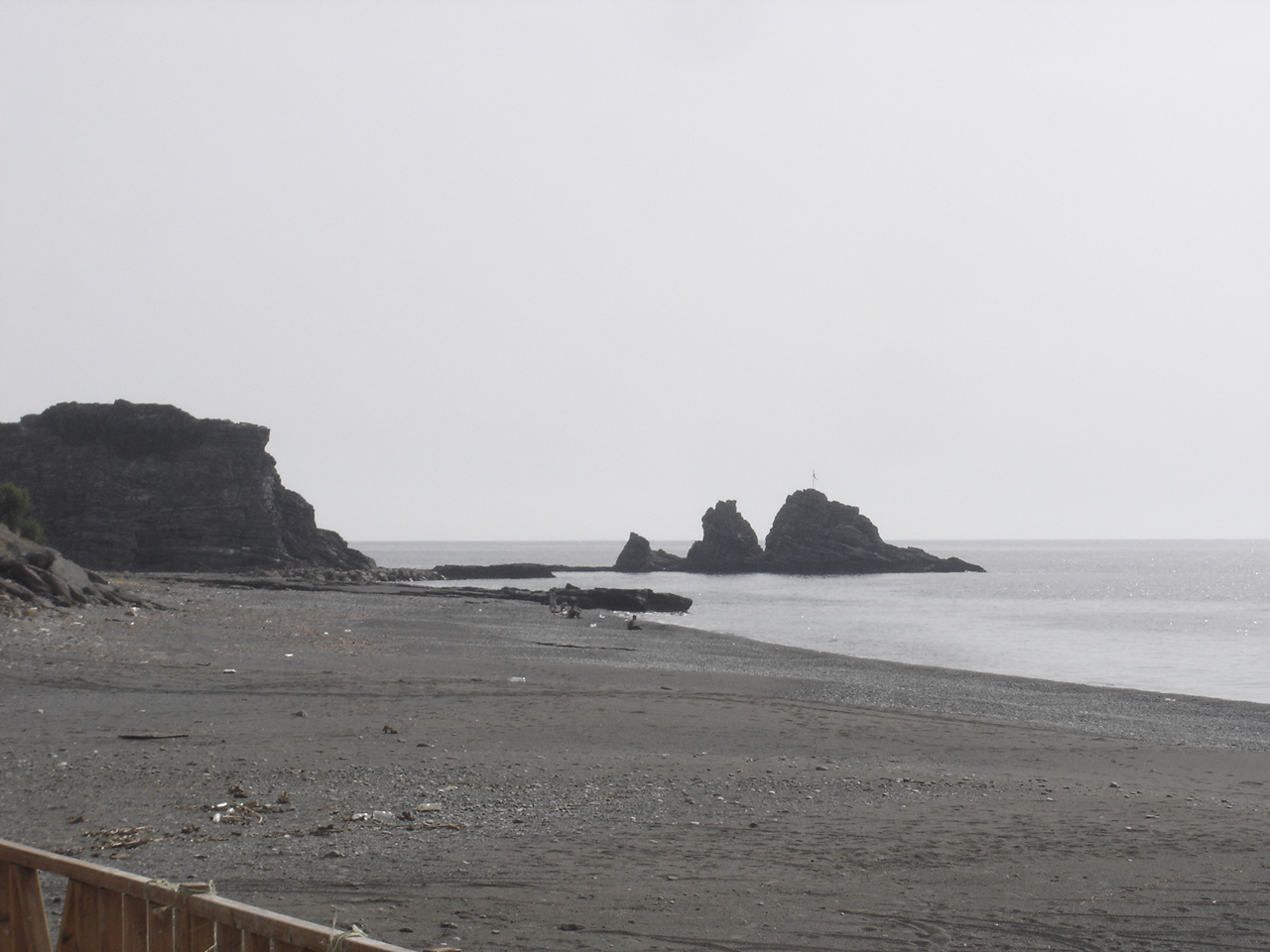
Psari Forada beach

Psari Forada is a seaside village in Heraklion regional unit, in Crete, Greece. It is situated in the Libyan Sea, 21 km west of Ierapetra. The local church is a tourist attraction. The seaside village of Sidonia is an extension of Psari Forada.

== History ==
The settlement was founded by residents of Kalamio, who initially came to this place for fishing only during the summer, as well as to oversee their crops. Today, it has become a permanent place of residence and has seen significant tourism growth recently. Regarding the name, Psari Forada belonged to an aga, who, to demonstrate his power, is said in legend to have hung his beloved gray mare at a specific spot. Another version suggests he tied the horse there and left it to die of hunger and thirst. This place, where the current settlement stands, took the name Psari Forada from this legend. Sidonia is identified with an ancient city of the same name.

== Location ==
The seaside village is surrounded by various hills which form the Psari Forada and Faflagkos plain. The village overlooks the Libyan Sea and is located between Lentas and Ierapetra along the south coast of Crete. Very close to the area is located the pine tree forest of Kato Symi.

== Climate ==
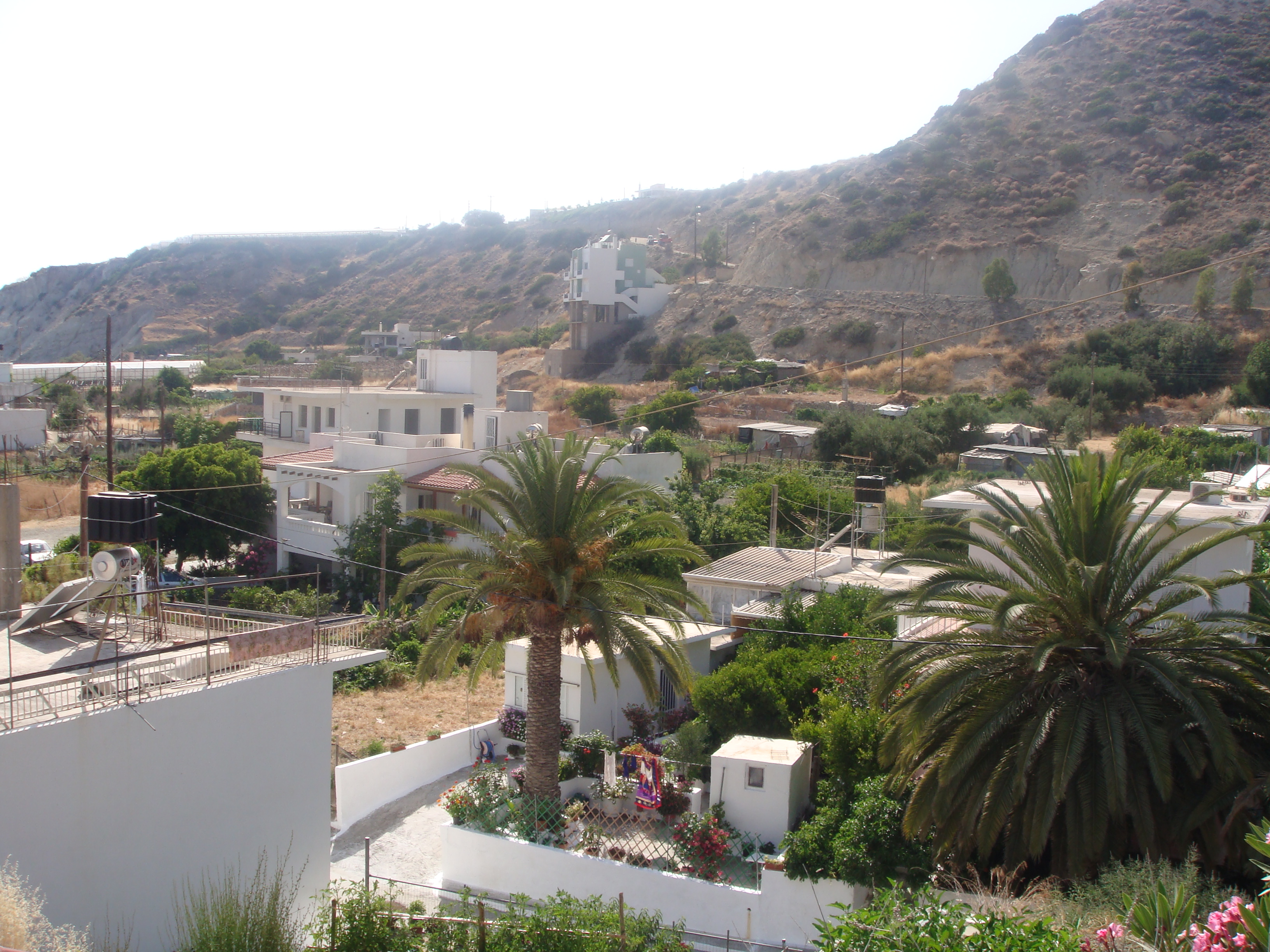
View of Psari Forada

According to the official Viannos Municipality meteorological station Psari Forada has a hot semi-arid climate (Köppen climate classification: BSh) with very mild winters and hot summers. Winters are wetter while summers can be particularly dry. Psari Forada falls in 11a hardiness zone. During the 2024 Greek drought Psari Forada was particularly hit with olive trees and various crops destroyed.

Climate data for Psari Forada 45 m a.s.l Climate: Hot semi-arid climate (BSh) • USDA: 11a (6.17°C)
Month	Jan	Feb	Mar	Apr	May	Jun	Jul	Aug	Sep	Oct	Nov	Dec	Year
Record high °C (°F)	23.1 (73.6)	25.5 (77.9)	27.2 (81.0)	30.2 (86.4)	37.7 (99.9)	40.8 (105.4)	40.9 (105.6)	38.4 (101.1)	35.4 (95.7)	33.6 (92.5)	27.7 (81.9)	23.8 (74.8)	40.9 (105.6)
Mean daily maximum °C (°F)	17.9 (64.2)	18.1 (64.6)	19.3 (66.7)	22.3 (72.1)	25.5 (77.9)	30.1 (86.2)	32.8 (91.0)	32.7 (90.9)	30.5 (86.9)	27.2 (81.0)	23.2 (73.8)	19.5 (67.1)	24.9 (76.9)
Daily mean °C (°F)	15.0 (59.0)	15.2 (59.4)	16.1 (61.0)	18.8 (65.8)	22.0 (71.6)	26.5 (79.7)	29.0 (84.2)	29.1 (84.4)	27.0 (80.6)	23.8 (74.8)	20.2 (68.4)	16.6 (61.9)	21.6 (70.9)
Mean daily minimum °C (°F)	12.1 (53.8)	12.3 (54.1)	12.9 (55.2)	15.4 (59.7)	18.4 (65.1)	22.9 (73.2)	25.3 (77.5)	25.5 (77.9)	23.5 (74.3)	20.4 (68.7)	17.2 (63.0)	13.8 (56.8)	18.3 (64.9)
Record low °C (°F)	3.1 (37.6)	3.2 (37.8)	4.5 (40.1)	10.5 (50.9)	13.4 (56.1)	17.4 (63.3)	21.4 (70.5)	22.7 (72.9)	16.6 (61.9)	14.9 (58.8)	12.4 (54.3)	5.9 (42.6)	3.1 (37.6)
Average rainfall mm (inches)	43.5 (1.71)	40.0 (1.57)	30.7 (1.21)	12.2 (0.48)	7.6 (0.30)	4.9 (0.19)	1.2 (0.05)	0.1 (0.00)	6.5 (0.26)	27.3 (1.07)	37.2 (1.46)	67.2 (2.65)	278.4 (10.95)
Source: Viannos Municipality (Feb 2016- Mar 2026)
