= Tris Ekklisies =

Tris Ekklisies Τρεις Εκκλησιές
- Community
- Location within Greece
- Country: Greece
- Administrative region: Crete
- Regional unit: Heraklion
- Municipality: Archanes-Asterousia
- Elevation: 1 m (3.3 ft)

Population (2021)
  - Community: 34
- Time zone: UTC+2 (EET)
  - Summer (DST): UTC+3 (EEST)

Tris Ekklisies (Greek: Τρεις Εκκλησιές) is a village located in the municipality of Archanes-Asterousia , Crete in Greece. It is situated in South Crete at the Libyan Sea, around 64 km south of Herakleion and at an altitude of around 10 meters.

== Geography ==
The village sits south of the Asterousia Mountains which separate the Messara Plain from the Libyan Sea.

== History ==
The village takes its name after the three Byzantine era churches that were built in the area during the 14th century. Evidence of ancient Cretan cultures have been found in excavations performed within sites contained in the Asterousia Mountains; moreover, one of the most significant Minoan sites on Crete has been excavated at nearby Phaistos to the north; apparently, the Phaistos palace was designed to permit views over the expansive Messara Plain and the Asterousi Mountains. A further historical name for this range is reported by Encyclopædia Britannica as the Kofinos Range, named after the highest peak of Asteroussia, Kofinas (1231 m).

== Climate ==
Tris Ekklisies enjoys a sunny and warm Mediterranean climate (Köppen: Csa) bordering a hot semi-arid climate (Köppen climate classification: BSh). According to the data of the Cultural Association of Tris Ekklisies station, winters are extremely mild by Greece's standards with a mean annual temperature of 22.1 °C (71.8 °F). In January 2025 it reached a mean minimum temperature of 14.7 °C (58.5 °F), which is the highest ever recorded in Greece during January. In November 2025 it reached a mean minimum temperature of 20.0 °C (68.0 °F) for the first 11 days.

Climate data for Tris Ekklisies (15 m a.s.l.) Climate: Hot-summer Mediterranean climate (Csa) • USDA: 11a (5.3°C)
Month	Jan	Feb	Mar	Apr	May	Jun	Jul	Aug	Sep	Oct	Nov	Dec	Year
Record high °C (°F)	21.5 (70.7)	20.9 (69.6)	25.6 (78.1)	26.8 (80.2)	32.3 (90.1)	41.4 (106.5)	42.1 (107.8)	39.0 (102.2)	36.8 (98.2)	29.8 (85.6)	27.8 (82.0)	22.6 (72.7)	42.1 (107.8)
Mean daily maximum °C (°F)	18.1 (64.6)	16.1 (61.0)	19.4 (66.9)	21.3 (70.3)	24.9 (76.8)	31.0 (87.8)	34.0 (93.2)	33.2 (91.8)	30.3 (86.5)	25.9 (78.6)	23.7 (74.7)	19.5 (67.1)	24.8 (76.6)
Daily mean °C (°F)	15.9 (60.6)	13.8 (56.8)	16.8 (62.2)	18.7 (65.7)	22.0 (71.6)	27.7 (81.9)	30.5 (86.9)	30.1 (86.2)	27.4 (81.3)	23.4 (74.1)	21.3 (70.3)	17.3 (63.1)	22.1 (71.7)
Mean daily minimum °C (°F)	13.7 (56.7)	11.4 (52.5)	14.2 (57.6)	16.0 (60.8)	19.0 (66.2)	24.4 (75.9)	27.0 (80.6)	26.9 (80.4)	24.5 (76.1)	20.9 (69.6)	18.9 (66.0)	15.0 (59.0)	19.3 (66.8)
Record low °C (°F)	5.6 (42.1)	4.4 (39.9)	9.6 (49.3)	9.5 (49.1)	14.3 (57.7)	17.7 (63.9)	21.4 (70.5)	23.9 (75.0)	18.8 (65.8)	17.8 (64.0)	12.6 (54.7)	9.9 (49.8)	4.4 (39.9)
Average rainfall mm (inches)	64.7 (2.55)	85.1 (3.35)	30.6 (1.20)	20.1 (0.79)	17.1 (0.67)	18.7 (0.74)	3.8 (0.15)	0.3 (0.01)	29.7 (1.17)	4.3 (0.17)	72.8 (2.87)	124.2 (4.89)	471.4 (18.56)
Source: Cultural Association of Tris Ekklisies, CW (Dec 2022-Aug 2026)
