= Lentas =

Coastal village in Crete, Greece

Coordinates: 34°56′N 24°55′E

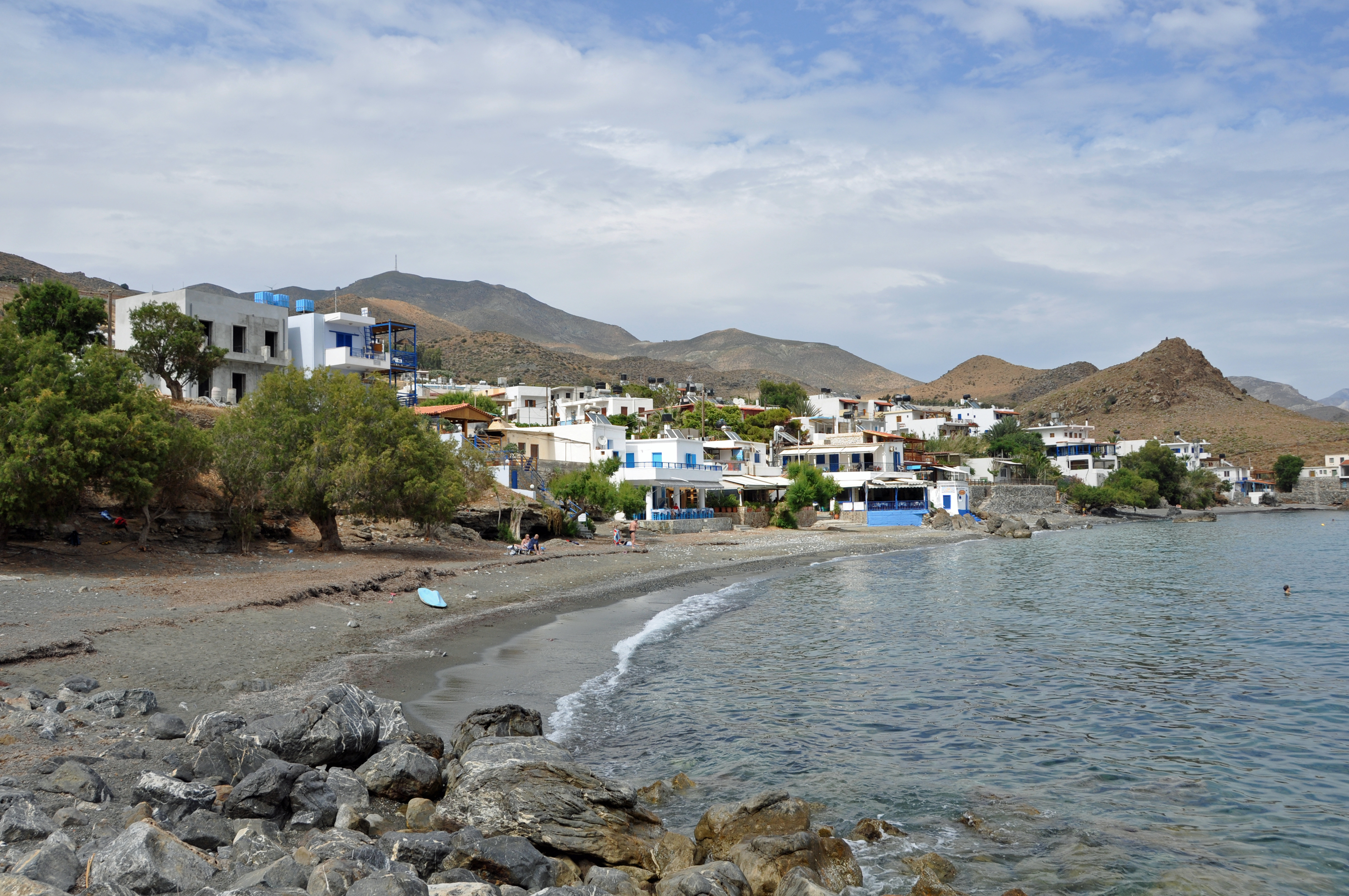
Lentas

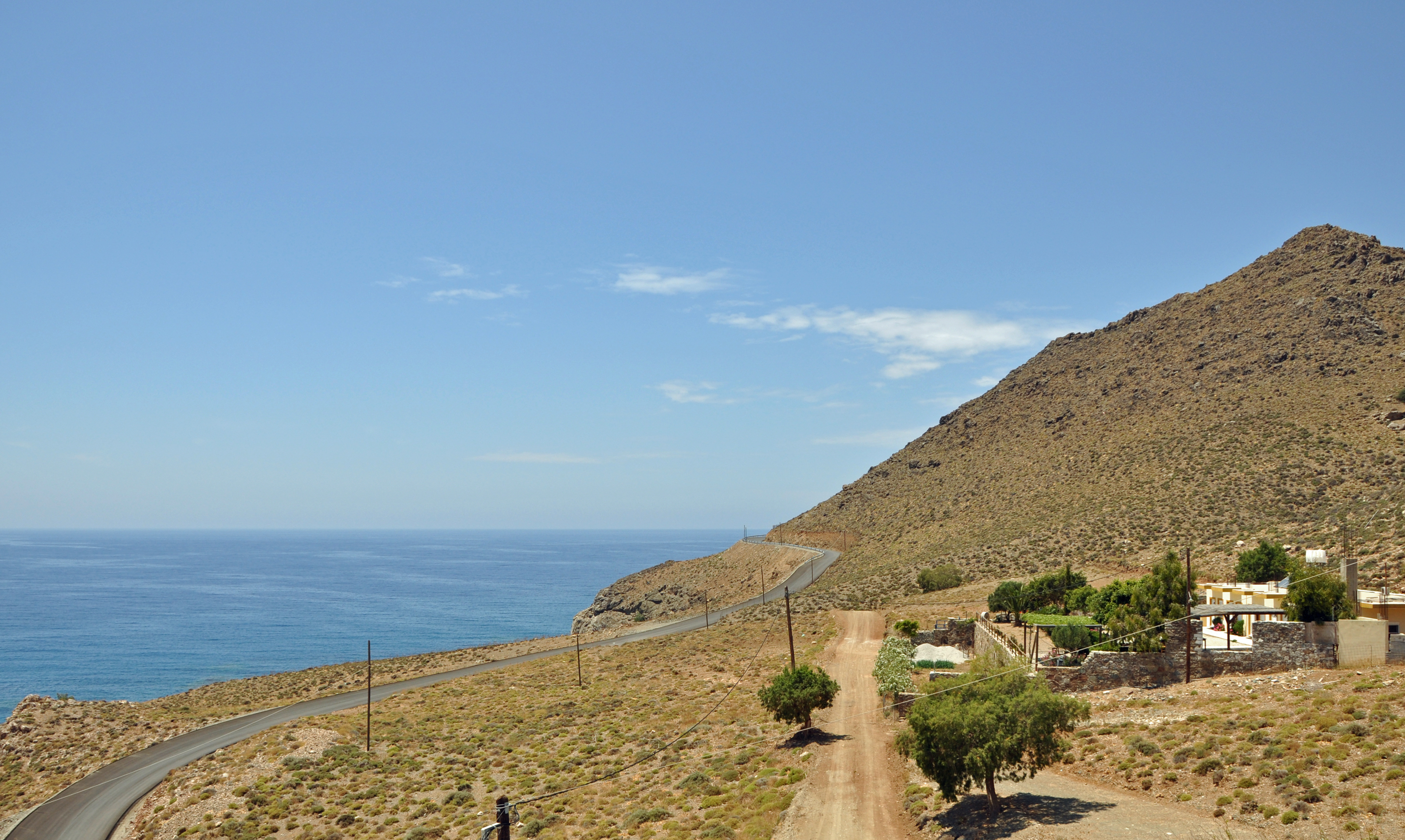
Bay of Loutra

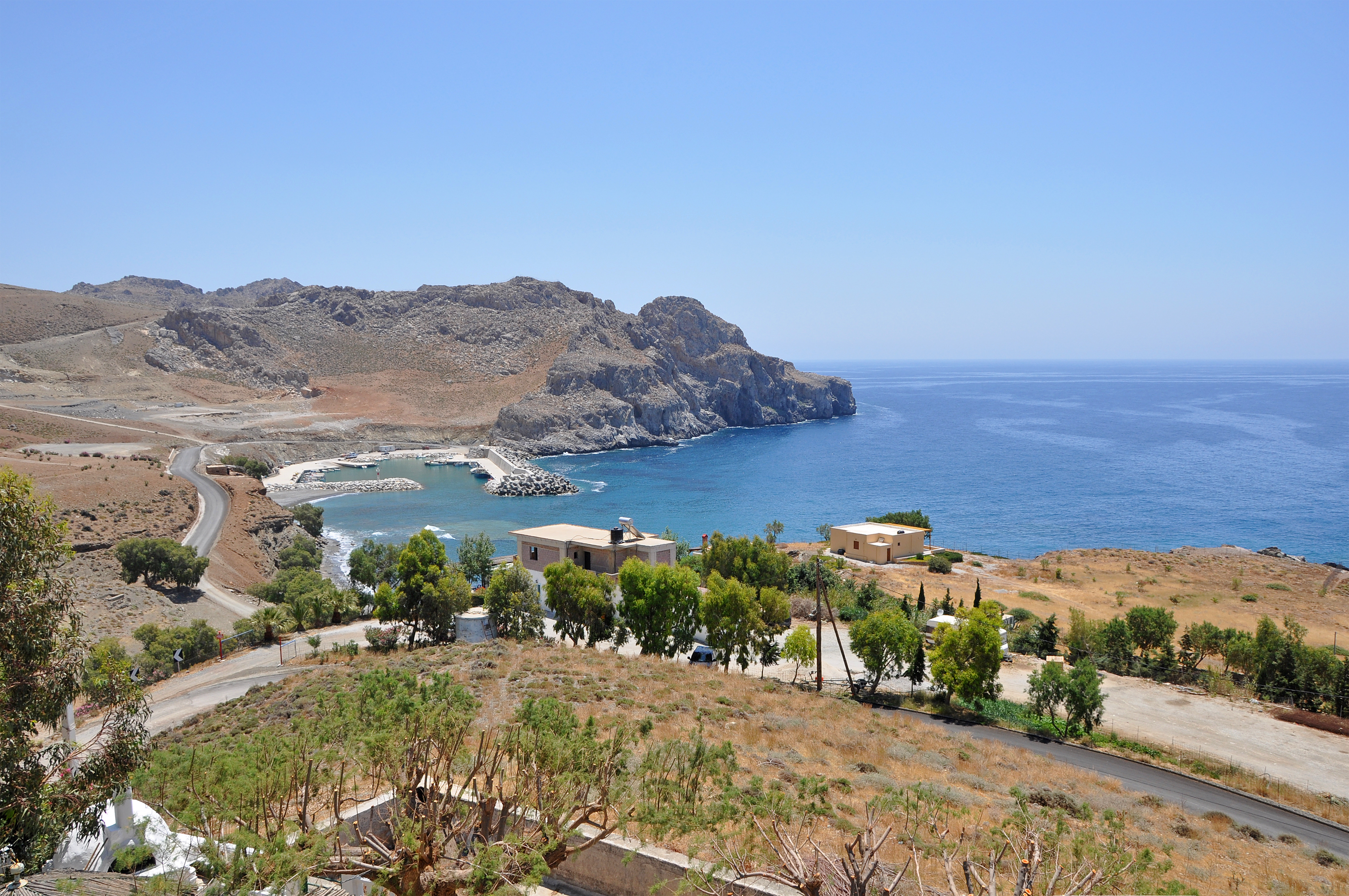
Loutra Bay and Marina

Lentas (Greek Λέντας) is a coastal village 75 km south of Heraklion, on the south coast of Crete in Greece. It belongs to the community of Miamou within the municipality of Gortyna.

== Origins of the name ==
The name of Lentas possibly derives from the Greek word Λέοντας (in English, "lion"). It refers to the lion-shaped cape that makes the small protected bay of Lentas. This cape is documented in medieval maps as Cape Liontas (Greek Ακρ. Λιώντας).

== Climate ==
According to the station of National Observatory of Athens, Lentas has a hot semi-arid climate (Köppen climate classification: BSh) with mild winters and hot summers. Lentas has an average annual temperature of around 21.0 °C and an average annual precipitation of around 360 mm. Lentas alongside Psari Forada are the warmest and driest areas of Crete. Also, Lentas falls in 11a plant hardiness zone.

Climate data for Lentas
Month	Jan	Feb	Mar	Apr	May	Jun	Jul	Aug	Sep	Oct	Nov	Dec	Year
Record high °C (°F)	21.9 (71.4)	25.2 (77.4)	24.2 (75.6)	29.7 (85.5)	36.7 (98.1)	39.6 (103.3)	43.3 (109.9)	42.7 (108.9)	36.7 (98.1)	33.2 (91.8)	27.2 (81.0)	23.3 (73.9)	43.3 (109.9)
Mean daily maximum °C (°F)	16.3 (61.3)	16.7 (62.1)	17.9 (64.2)	21.3 (70.3)	24.8 (76.6)	29.0 (84.2)	33.0 (91.4)	32.8 (91.0)	29.7 (85.5)	25.7 (78.3)	22.0 (71.6)	18.2 (64.8)	24.0 (75.1)
Daily mean °C (°F)	13.8 (56.8)	14.1 (57.4)	15.2 (59.4)	18.2 (64.8)	21.6 (70.9)	25.6 (78.1)	29.4 (84.9)	29.4 (84.9)	26.6 (79.9)	22.9 (73.2)	19.4 (66.9)	15.8 (60.4)	21.0 (69.8)
Mean daily minimum °C (°F)	11.3 (52.3)	11.6 (52.9)	12.4 (54.3)	15.1 (59.2)	18.3 (64.9)	22.2 (72.0)	25.8 (78.4)	26.1 (79.0)	23.5 (74.3)	20.0 (68.0)	16.9 (62.4)	13.3 (55.9)	18.0 (64.5)
Record low °C (°F)	2.3 (36.1)	2.3 (36.1)	3.9 (39.0)	7.8 (46.0)	12.8 (55.0)	16.3 (61.3)	20.8 (69.4)	22.3 (72.1)	15.2 (59.4)	14.3 (57.7)	10.2 (50.4)	5.3 (41.5)	2.3 (36.1)
Average rainfall mm (inches)	82.2 (3.24)	61.7 (2.43)	41.1 (1.62)	13.6 (0.54)	8.8 (0.35)	5.4 (0.21)	0.1 (0.00)	1.1 (0.04)	10.3 (0.41)	30.2 (1.19)	45.1 (1.78)	61.0 (2.40)	360.6 (14.21)
Source: National Observatory of Athens Monthly Bulletins (Dec 2011-Jan 2024) and World Meteorological Organization

== History ==
Lentas has been inhabited since the Neolithic and Early Minoan period (3rd millennium BC). Lentas (Ancient Greek: Λεβήνη, romanized: Lebene) was one of the two harbours of Gortyn, which became the most prominent city of Crete after the fall of Knossos. At the beginning of the 4th century BC, the Gortynians established a sanctuary of Asclepius at the harbour. An earthquake in 46 BC destroyed the city, but it was subsequently rebuilt. Gortyn became the capital of the province during the Roman era, which also comprised Cyrenaica (now eastern Libya). It is believed that Leben became a sanatorium where sick wealthy Romans, mainly from North Africa, received treatment. The treatment consisted of a diet with mineral water from an ancient spring near the temple of Asklepios, which was believed to have therapeutic properties and local fruits. In the early Christian and Byzantine periods, a small settlement developed and a basilica was erected. The small Byzantine church of St. John was built in the 14th century.

The archaeological investigation of the site started after the first visit of the English captain H. Spratt, in the middle of the 19th century. Excavations were carried out by the Italian Archaeological School at Athens in 1900, 1910, and 1912–13, and revealed the sanctuary and other buildings. Since then no excavation had taken place in the ancient city until recent years when the investigations of the Greek Archaeological Service brought to light the Minoan settlement and graves. The archaeological area comprises the sanctuary of Asclepius and the Byzantine church of St John.

Today, Lentas is a popular tourist destination and has rural and stock farming activities.
