= List of cities by average precipitation =

This is a selected list of cities around the world with their average monthly precipitation in millimetres (equivalently litres per square metre).

== Africa ==
Average monthly precipitation (in mm) for selected cities in Africa
City	Country	Year	Jan	Feb	Mar	Apr	May	Jun	Jul	Aug	Sep	Oct	Nov	Dec	Ref.
Algiers	Algeria	598.3	81.4	72.7	55.0	58.4	41.9	8.5	4.5	8.2	28.3	58.8	89.6	91.0	
Batna	Algeria	326.2	24.9	29.3	38.0	31.7	32.0	20.1	7.5	17.7	37.3	27.3	31.7	28.7	
Biskra	Algeria	129.1	16.0	8.4	14.7	16.6	11.1	3.4	0.7	2.7	16.2	15.3	14.8	9.2	
Skikda	Algeria	728.8	115.3	94.0	75.6	60.8	29.9	13.1	2.9	9.7	30.1	75.0	99.2	123.0	
Tamanrasset	Algeria	58.4	1.3	0.9	4.2	0.9	2.9	7.0	8.0	17.8	6.0	8.3	0.5	0.6	
Douala	Cameroon	3,602.7	34.2	54.5	155.2	241.2	276.2	354.1	681.4	687.5	561.2	406.6	123.1	27.5	
N'Djamena	Chad	510.3	0.0	0.0	0.3	10.3	25.8	51.0	143.8	174.4	84.3	20.3	0.1	0.0	
Brazzaville	Congo	1,394	160.0	137.0	167.0	191.0	118.0	8.0	3.0	4.0	34.0	139.0	261.0	172.0	
Cairo	Egypt	24.8	4.8	4.1	5.7	1.1	0.4	0.1	0.0	0.0	0.0	0.4	3.7	4.5	
Mbabane	Eswatini	1,441.7	253.2	224.6	151.6	87.9	33.8	19.4	20.1	35.1	69.4	141.9	197.8	206.9	
Cocobeach	Gabon	3,126	215.8	218.1	274.7	290.7	346.7	68.3	14.5	36.7	248.7	680.7	456.5	274.6	
Banjul	Gambia	839.2	0.7	0.9	0.0	0.0	2.5	44.7	174.8	303.6	244.1	66.4	1.3	0.2	
Accra	Ghana	798.5	11.8	25.5	61.1	87.8	151.4	189.6	63.0	21.0	42.9	80.0	37.2	27.2	
Conakry	Guinea	3,784	1.0	1.0	3.0	22.0	137.0	396.0	1130.0	1104.0	617.0	295.0	70.0	8.0	
Bissau	Guinea Bissau	2,022.8	0.5	0.8	0.5	0.8	17.3	174.8	472.5	682.5	434.9	194.8	41.4	2.0	
Abidjan	Ivory Coast	1,847.6	16.3	48.9	106.7	141.3	293.5	561.8	205.7	36.8	80.5	137.7	143.3	75.1	
Maseru	Lesotho	691	114.0	89.0	96.0	67.0	29.0	12.0	14.0	15.0	19.0	63.0	80.0	93.0	
Monrovia	Liberia	4,624	51.0	71.0	120.0	154.0	442.0	958.0	797.0	354.0	720.0	598.0	237.0	122.0	
Niamey	Niger	540.8	0.0	0.0	3.9	5.7	34.7	68.8	154.3	170.8	92.2	9.7	0.7	0.0	
Abeokuta	Nigeria	1,246.3	5.3	24.9	70.5	117.9	164.6	189.4	192.1	103.3	203.4	146.1	23.7	5.2	
Kaduna	Nigeria	1,280	0.5	2.0	13.0	66.0	157.0	178.0	206.0	290.0	277.0	86.0	5.0	0.0	
Kano	Nigeria	1,149.2	0.0	0.0	0.3	14.0	70.1	160.4	306.9	400.4	175.2	21.8	0.0	0.0	
Lagos	Nigeria	1,506.6	13.2	40.6	84.3	146.3	202.4	315.5	243.0	121.7	160.0	125.1	39.7	14.8	
Port Harcourt	Nigeria	2,286.5	22.1	59.7	114.6	159.2	260.9	310.1	357.9	290.2	354.0	251.7	87.2	19.0	
Yola	Nigeria	886.1	0.1	0.2	2.3	35.5	94.5	138.8	159.7	196.2	189.4	67.9	0.8	0.5	
Dakar	Senegal	392.5	1.2	0.4	0.1	0.0	0.0	7.0	52.8	165.6	138.4	26.3	0.3	0.4	
Kaolack	Senegal	630.6	0.9	0.6	0.0	0.0	1.7	36.0	117.9	238.5	190.5	43.6	0.9	0.0	
Kolda	Senegal	1,057.8	0.1	0.1	0.0	0.1	19.0	121.5	248.9	318.4	265.4	81.7	2.6	0.0	
Ziguinchor	Senegal	1,401.2	4.9	0.2	0.0	0.0	2.9	93.1	341.1	480.7	358.6	113.5	6.1	0.1	
Freetown	Sierra Leone	4,433	6.0	8.0	28.0	68.0	214.0	522.0	1190.0	1078.0	800.0	333.0	148.0	38.0	
Cape Town	South Africa	492.8	9.4	9.6	12.5	40.1	61.1	92.3	84.8	72.4	44.3	28.4	25.3	12.8	
Durban	South Africa	1,019	134.0	113.0	120.0	73.0	59.0	38.0	39.0	62.0	73.0	98.0	108.0	102.0	
Port Elizabeth	South Africa	591.5	33.0	39.3	46.2	48.5	46.9	51.7	51.4	72.1	47.3	56.2	56.6	42.2	
Ceuta	Spain	849	122.0	145.0	90.0	57.0	21.0	3.0	1.0	3.0	37.0	82.0	127.0	161.0	
Melilla	Spain	391	58.0	57.0	44.0	36.0	20.0	7.0	1.0	4.0	16.0	40.0	57.0	50.0	
Dar es Salaam	Tanzania	1,117.4	54.2	70.8	169.6	263.6	172.2	31.3	15.8	17.8	20.2	77.3	114.4	110.2	
Lomé	Togo	830.3	13.3	16.4	67.3	97.3	148.8	180.5	74.4	30.1	72.3	101.9	20.4	7.6	

== Asia ==
Average monthly precipitation (in mm) for selected cities in Asia
City	Country	Year	Jan	Feb	Mar	Apr	May	Jun	Jul	Aug	Sep	Oct	Nov	Dec	Ref.
Mawsynram	India	11,304.57	19.0	25.0	198.0	490.0	1436.0	3162.0	3300.0	2330.0	1050.0	331.0	48.0	4.0	
Sylhet	Bangladesh	7,377.30	5.1	11.2	215.40	588.6	712.10	1524.3	1348.5	1010.20	745.8	222.6	18.5	2	
Faizabad	Afghanistan	484.9	49.4	65.0	91.9	97.9	77.0	8.2	5.8	1.0	1.5	23.4	29.7	34.1	
Herat	Afghanistan	238.9	51.6	44.8	55.1	29.2	9.8	0.0	0.0	0.0	0.0	1.7	10.9	35.8	
Jalalabad	Afghanistan	181.9	18.1	24.3	39.2	36.4	16.0	1.4	6.9	7.7	8.3	3.2	8.3	12.1	
Kabul	Afghanistan	312.0	34.3	60.1	67.9	71.9	23.4	1.0	6.2	1.6	1.7	3.7	18.6	21.6	
Khost	Afghanistan	476.5	25.9	53.6	61.8	65.2	39.8	21.6	75.9	62.0	30.5	7.7	11.6	20.9	
Mazar-i-Sharif	Afghanistan	186.4	28.9	34.8	43.8	28.3	11.2	0.2	0.0	0.0	0.1	3.9	13.5	21.7	
Artashat	Armenia	245.0	17.1	18.8	23.9	43.6	37.9	21.8	10.5	5.8	9.1	18.0	22.3	16.2	
Vanadzor	Armenia	565.0	18.0	25.0	36.0	63.0	96.0	95.0	58.0	43.0	32.0	47.0	33.0	19.0	
Yerevan	Armenia	363.0	21.0	21.0	60.0	56.0	47.0	24.0	17.0	10.0	10.0	51.0	25.0	21.0	
Baguio	Philippines	3824.4	16.4	23.7	50.5	99.5	340.0	406.1	772.7	963.2	537.3	477.3	96.1	41.6	
Manama	Bahrain	70.8	14.6	16.0	13.9	10.0	1.1	0.0	0.0	0.0	0.0	0.5	3.8	10.9	
Sibsu	Bhutan	5,520.5	20.6	40.4	102.6	333.1	631.1	1069.1	1321.2	1075.2	665.9	213.8	32.9	14.3	
Thimphu	Bhutan	608.0	6.3	9.2	20.4	29.9	49.8	97.7	152.8	120.8	73.9	43.1	1.2	3.7	
Beijing	China	528.0	2.2	5.8	8.6	21.7	36.1	72.4	169.7	113.4	53.7	28.7	13.5	2.2	
Chengdu	China	923.0	7.0	10.0	21.0	47.0	87.0	103.0	231.0	224.0	132.0	120.3	39.0	17.0	
Hefei	China	1,042.8	47.4	52.8	76.3	83.7	90.1	158.5	185.1	138.7	70.3	51.6	54.6	33.7	
Hong Kong	China	2,431.3	33.2	38.9	75.3	153.0	290.6	491.5	385.8	453.2	321.4	120.3	39.3	28.8	
Shanghai	China	1,245.5	70.4	65.4	95.4	82.5	93.2	207.3	148.0	187.1	118.1	68.4	59.4	50.3	
Turpan	China	14.7	0.9	0.5	0.7	0.9	1.0	2.6	2.0	2.0	1.4	1.2	0.6	0.9	
Ürümqi	China	305.2	11.0	13.6	18.8	38.3	41.3	28.8	35.4	30.4	19.8	23.8	23.7	20.3	
Agra	India	760.7	12.4	12.1	8.8	12.3	22.6	81.7	214.9	230.2	129.6	29.4	3.4	3.5	
Delhi	India	758.9	19.2	21.5	19.1	12.5	29.4	80.6	195.8	226.8	128.0	14.1	4.1	8.0	
Guwahati	India	1,695.3	11.5	18.0	52.5	182.1	253.0	314.0	283.4	264.3	184.5	117.9	9.6	4.6	
Hyderabad	India	859.6	9.2	10.2	12.3	27.2	34.5	113.8	162.0	203.9	148.5	113.9	19.1	5.0	
Imphal	India	1,381.1	10.5	21.6	70.8	124.1	191.6	218.1	229.9	194.8	163.3	112.5	26.2	17.7	
Jammu	India	1,402.0	67.9	74.6	64.1	41.4	22.5	109.5	416.5	403.1	144.8	23.5	12.2	21.9	
Kolkata	India	1,813.3	15.4	24.6	36.8	55.0	118.5	276.7	371.6	372.1	325.0	179.6	32.6	5.6	
Kohima	India	1,727.6	12.1	28.5	48.6	100.1	188.5	248.3	334.7	344.0	268.2	125.2	22.9	6.4	
Mumbai	India	2,213.4	0.6	0.4	0.7	0.2	15.9	506.0	768.5	471.9	355.6	81.7	8.5	3.4	
Panaji	India	2,984.1	1.0	0.1	0.0	4.9	76.6	890.4	955.2	571.7	304.1	156.4	21.3	2.5	
Pondicherry	India	1,354.0	12.3	22.2	19.3	7.8	48.6	48.0	89.5	132.3	132.8	273.9	350.0	217.3	
Port Blair	India	2,968.3	32.1	16.8	32.5	75.8	368.8	448.2	442.5	446.4	458.3	301.4	242.4	103.2	
Shimla	India	1,487.3	79.6	82.6	78.6	58.3	82.2	191.8	328.3	351.3	164.5	30.3	13.6	26.2	
Srinagar	India	697.5	63.6	85.0	104.6	91.8	63.5	46.4	64.0	64.5	37.4	21.8	27.7	27.2	
Ahvaz	Iran	209.2	48.2	26.9	26.4	16.1	4.4	0.4	0.1	0.0	0.2	6.4	31.4	48.7	
Astara	Iran	1,345.0	87.5	92.3	111.2	80.5	63.7	45.9	46.7	77.8	230.6	243.4	157.4	108.0	
Bandar-e Anzali	Iran	1,713.8	151.8	115.0	89.8	62.4	31.5	44.1	50.0	108.8	277.8	288.0	301.3	194.1	
Gorgan	Iran	583.8	54.0	55.5	76.7	51.4	42.1	31.4	20.7	26.2	39.5	62.8	67.1	56.4	
Ilam	Iran	550.6	106.3	87.1	89.4	63.6	19.0	0.1	1.0	1.0	1.4	28.3	77.4	76.0	
Isfahan	Iran	175.0	29.7	25.5	31.6	29.9	8.5	1.2	1.6	0.3	0.1	3.7	13.0	29.9	
Kermanshah	Iran	439.2	60.0	58.5	80.3	64.7	29.2	1.2	0.5	0.3	2.1	25.5	55.9	61.0	
Mashhad	Iran	251.5	32.6	34.5	55.5	45.4	27.2	4.0	1.1	0.7	2.1	8.0	16.1	24.3	
Sanandaj	Iran	449.9	62.0	60.7	77.1	71.7	36.5	2.2	0.9	0.4	0.9	26.7	56.8	54.0	
Tabriz	Iran	283.8	22.0	24.2	40.0	51.6	41.1	16.4	5.6	3.3	7.9	22.5	27.1	22.1	
Tehran	Iran	231.6	33.3	33.5	38.4	30.9	14.4	2.7	2.5	1.8	1.0	12.5	27.5	33.1	
Yazd	Iran	52.2	11.2	6.2	10.6	5.6	3.6	0.4	0.0	0.0	0.0	0.9	4.6	9.1	
Baghdad	Iraq	124.7	24.6	16.6	15.7	16.2	3.3	0.0	0.0	0.0	0.1	7.6	23.6	17.0	
Mosul	Iraq	363.6	62.1	62.7	63.2	44.1	15.2	1.1	0.2	0.0	0.3	11.8	45.0	57.9	
Nagoya	Japan	1,535.4	48.4	65.6	121.8	124.8	156.5	201.0	203.6	126.3	234.4	128.3	79.7	45.0	
Owase	Japan	3,969.7	106.0	118.8	233.8	295.4	360.5	436.6	405.2	427.3	745.7	507.6	211.5	121.3	
Aktau	Kazakhstan	138.0	12.0	11.0	13.0	17.0	12.0	9.0	9.0	8.0	5.0	10.0	15.0	18.0	
Almaty	Kazakhstan	673.0	34.0	43.0	73.0	113.0	99.0	59.0	43.0	34.0	28.0	49.0	55.0	44.0	
Astana	Kazakhstan	338.0	18.0	17.0	20.0	22.0	33.0	40.0	56.0	31.0	21.0	26.0	29.0	25.0	
Labuan	Malaysia	3,244.8	233.1	122.9	109.9	195.7	297.8	287.6	284.8	283.5	351.3	390.8	377.9	309.5	
Ulaanbaatar	Mongolia	260.0	2.0	3.0	4.0	11.0	20.0	45.0	71.0	62.0	26.0	7.0	6.0	3.0	
Chongjin	North Korea	613.9	12.2	7.4	15.1	29.6	64.7	73.8	126.7	126.1	79.8	34.0	29.2	15.3	
Pyongyang	North Korea	936.4	9.6	14.5	23.9	44.8	74.7	90.2	274.7	209.6	90.8	47.2	38.4	18.0	
Muscat	Oman	100.3	12.8	24.5	15.9	17.1	7.0	0.9	0.2	0.8	0.0	1.0	6.8	13.3	
Islamabad	Pakistan	1,268.6	55.2	99.5	96.5	58.1	39.9	78.4	310.6	317.0	135.4	34.4	17.7	25.9	
Lahore	Pakistan	674.2	21.9	31.5	31.5	19.5	17.7	73.8	188.6	177.1	88.6	10.3	6.9	6.8	
Quetta	Pakistan	241.5	45.0	48.4	49.5	30.0	7.8	3.2	8.8	4.9	4.2	4.5	10.3	24.6	
Doha	Qatar	75.2	13.2	17.1	16.1	8.7	3.6	0.0	0.0	0.0	0.0	1.1	3.3	12.1	
Irkutsk	Russia	477.0	14.0	9.0	12.0	21.0	36.0	69.0	107.0	96.0	53.0	21.0	20.0	19.0	
Petropavlovsk- Kamchatsky	Russia	1177.0	110.0	75.0	103.0	88.0	58.0	57.0	66.0	91.0	105.0	154.0	156.0	115.0	
Vladivostok	Russia	862.0	12.0	16.0	27.0	43.0	97.0	105.0	159.0	176.0	103.0	67.0	36.0	19.0	
Jeju City	South Korea	1,502.3	67.5	57.2	90.6	87.9	95.6	171.2	210.2	272.3	227.8	95.1	69.5	55.6	
Seoul	South Korea	1,417.9	16.8	28.2	36.9	72.9	103.6	129.5	414.4	348.2	141.5	52.2	51.1	22.6	
Damascus	Syria	124.7	26.0	22.4	13.9	5.6	4.8	0.3	0.0	0.0	0.3	6.3	21.4	23.6	
Homs	Syria	429.4	95.1	76.5	56.4	33.3	13.0	2.6	0.2	0.0	2.4	21.1	48.1	80.7	
Kaohsiung	Taiwan	1998	40.9	38	46.6	96.6	253.2	371.8	318.1	407.4	226.8	93.4	59.6	45.8	
Taipei	Taiwan	2,368.5	93.8	129.4	157.8	151.4	245.2	354.6	214.2	336.5	336.8	162.6	89.3	96.9	
Taoyuan	Taiwan	1718	83.1	103.5	111.9	123.3	161.2	180	173.3	257.8	210.5	140.5	89.7	83.4	
Dushanbe	Tajikistan	654.0	100.0	95.0	102.0	112.0	75.0	17.0	4.0	1.0	4.0	29.0	55.0	60.0	
Khujand	Tajikistan	226.0	14.0	20.0	37.0	42.0	48.0	10.0	2.0	2.0	2.0	15.0	20.0	16.0	
Ankara	Turkey	413.6	38.6	36.6	46.9	44.5	51.0	40.2	14.8	14.6	17.9	33.4	31.9	43.2	
Antalya	Turkey	1070.4	214.3	110.7	105.3	64.2	39.6	8.4	2.4	2.2	19.6	81.6	147.6	274.5	
Bolu	Turkey	573.6	55.6	50.6	56.2	52.8	64.2	68.9	28.4	27.4	26.5	48.5	40.4	54.1	
Bursa	Turkey	719.1	79.2	78.2	74.9	68.6	47.9	42.8	14.3	17.5	50.1	84.4	67.3	93.9	
Erzurum	Turkey	429.3	21.6	25.9	35.4	54.5	72.6	48.5	26.8	17.9	24.2	47.1	32.9	21.9	
Giresun	Turkey	1290.5	129.2	100.7	99.1	75.0	68.1	77.1	79.9	90.6	129.5	162.7	151.3	127.3	
Kars	Turkey	506.0	22.9	23.2	30.0	48.8	82.7	76.7	56.3	43.9	29.4	41.9	27.3	22.9	
Konya	Turkey	325.3	35.9	23.1	27.4	34.2	38.2	27.8	6.5	6.5	15.9	29.7	34.5	45.6	
Rize	Turkey	2,309.5	223.1	170.5	154.0	90.5	96.6	148.4	163.4	192.5	265.1	307.3	246.0	252.1	
Trabzon	Turkey	828.0	83.1	63.9	59.7	56.5	52.2	51.8	35.5	48.2	78.9	113.6	99.6	85.0	
Urfa	Turkey	459.3	87.0	67.7	63.0	49.0	27.2	4.3	2.0	3.6	4.6	25.9	45.1	79.9	
Ashgabat	Turkmenistan	221.0	21.0	33.0	42.0	33.0	23.0	8.0	3.0	2.0	3.0	12.0	23.0	8.0	
Bukhara	Uzbekistan	132.4	16.5	24.1	25.1	22.3	11.1	1.8	0.4	0.3	0.8	2.7	14.5	12.8	

== Europe ==
Average monthly precipitation (in mm) for selected cities in Europe
City	Country	Year	Jan	Feb	Mar	Apr	May	Jun	Jul	Aug	Sep	Oct	Nov	Dec	Ref.
Tirana	Albania	1,266.0	143.0	132.0	115.0	104.0	103.0	68.0	42.0	46.0	78.0	114.0	172.0	148.0	
Vienna	Austria	673.1	42.1	38.1	51.6	41.8	78.9	70.0	77.7	69.1	64.1	46.9	46.0	46.8	
Bregenz	Austria	1,519.0	71.0	75.0	100.0	114.0	146.0	182.0	191.0	177.0	148.0	105.0	108.0	102.0	
Graz	Austria	854.2	19.8	28.9	34.6	51.6	93.2	121.3	124.1	128.7	93.8	63.8	54.4	40.0	
Minsk	Belarus	690.0	45.0	39.0	44.0	42.0	65.0	89.0	89.0	68.0	60.0	52.0	48.0	49.0	
Brussels	Belgium	848.0	75.2	61.6	69.5	51.0	65.1	72.1	73.6	76.8	69.6	75.0	77.0	81.4	
Banja Luka	Bosnia and Herzegovina	1,037.2	71.7	67.6	77.8	86.5	98.3	109.2	73.9	74.2	83.9	103.9	89.5	100.8	
Bihać	Bosnia and Herzegovina	1,308.8	85.8	90.8	99.2	115.0	116.3	109.0	105.9	109.5	107.9	109.6	146.2	113.6	
Mostar	Bosnia and Herzegovina	1,522.5	164.7	153.2	150.0	127.3	102.1	77.9	44.8	73.7	96.3	153.5	199.9	178.9	
Sarajevo	Bosnia and Herzegovina	928.0	68.0	64.0	70.0	77.0	72.0	90.0	72.0	66.0	91.0	86.0	85.0	86.0	
Sofia	Bulgaria	625.0	35.0	36.0	45.0	52.0	73.0	79.0	64.0	55.0	53.0	54.0	38.0	40.0	
Varna	Bulgaria	516.0	45.0	33.0	32.0	38.0	38.0	52.0	48.0	29.0	49.0	56.0	49.0	47.0	
Parg	Croatia	1,841.0	119.5	113.5	129.1	141.1	138.5	158.3	118.9	134.2	180.8	230.9	213.5	162.7	
Zagreb	Croatia	840.1	43.2	38.9	52.6	59.3	72.6	95.3	77.4	92.3	85.8	82.9	80.1	59.6	
Split	Croatia	782.8	73.7	61.2	63.4	61.9	61.6	47.3	25.5	44.8	68.9	82.1	101.7	90.8	
Nicosia	Cyprus	342.2	54.7	41.6	28.3	19.9	23.5	17.6	5.8	1.3	11.7	17.4	54.6	65.8	
Liberec	Czech Republic	845.3	64.9	53.8	61.4	41.3	75.6	89.0	107.1	99.7	69.0	58.8	58.7	66.2	
Prague	Czech Republic	587.0	34.0	30.0	40.0	34.0	63.0	70.0	82.0	75.0	47.0	34.0	40.0	38.0	
Copenhagen	Denmark	645.7	53.0	36.9	42.3	35.8	47.2	63.9	60.9	67.5	61.0	63.3	56.4	57.4	
Tallinn	Estonia	700.0	56.0	40.0	37.0	35.0	37.0	68.0	82.0	85.0	58.0	78.0	66.0	59.0	
Kurmangazy	Kazakhstan	149.8	9.1	6.3	11.6	16.2	18.2	16.4	14.1	11.7	13.8	12.9	10.4	9.0	
Tórshavn	Faroe Islands	1,321.3	157.7	115.2	131.6	89.5	63.3	57.5	74.3	96.0	119.5	147.4	139.3	135.3	
Helsinki	Finland	655.0	52.0	36.0	38.0	32.0	37.0	57.0	63.0	80.0	56.0	76.0	70.0	58.0	
Ajaccio	France	635.0	54.1	48.1	50.4	53.1	49.8	25.9	8.6	15.8	57.8	85.7	111.8	73.9	
Biarritz	France	1,473.6	139.6	110.4	102.8	117.7	116.1	99.2	77.3	87.5	118.2	147.3	206.9	150.6	
Bordeaux	France	924.9	86.9	66.9	63.3	75.6	71.1	70.4	48.6	56.7	81.2	83.3	114.5	106.4	
Lille	France	740.0	58.2	50.8	52.1	45.3	61.6	63.7	67.8	71.3	56.7	64.1	75.0	73.3	
Lyon	France	831.9	47.2	44.1	50.4	74.9	90.8	75.6	63.7	62.0	87.5	98.6	81.9	55.2	
Marseille	France	532.3	47.1	29.8	29.5	51.6	37.7	27.9	10.8	25.8	82.0	73.3	75.9	40.9	
Paris	France	637.4	51.0	41.2	47.6	51.8	63.2	49.6	62.3	52.7	47.6	61.5	51.1	57.8	
Saint-Étienne	France	728.3	38.3	30.3	33.9	55.0	81.5	80.8	77.2	72.8	70.3	76.2	73.0	39.0	
Toulouse	France	627.0	52.5	37.2	45.3	65.2	73.6	64.2	40.1	44.6	45.7	54.3	55.0	49.3	
Akhaltsikhe	Georgia	527.9	24.3	26.7	35.9	49.3	67.0	77.7	61.0	49.8	34.3	40.5	35.3	26.2	
Ambrolauri	Georgia	1112.4	96.5	70.8	77.1	84.2	98.7	96.0	84.8	79.8	86.4	115.9	108.7	100.3	
Batumi	Georgia	2,519.0	234.7	183.4	156.6	90.1	92.5	141.0	164.9	220.7	330.1	321.5	305.5	277.1	
Kutaisi	Georgia	1,461.0	164.7	121.4	129.6	88.0	91.3	110.0	98.0	96.6	114.6	148.4	145.8	152.5	
Poti	Georgia	2,068.3	154.6	122.1	128.2	84.9	95.1	161.5	227.3	256.7	270.2	232.1	173.5	162.1	
Tbilisi	Georgia	495.5	18.9	25.8	30.3	50.5	77.6	76.0	44.9	47.5	35.6	37.5	29.9	21.0	
Zugdidi	Georgia	1,951.8	151.3	139.7	163.1	126.3	153.7	220.7	178.9	159.3	139.5	186.0	169.4	144.3	
Bad Wiessee	Germany	2,388.9	162.2	160.3	192.3	160.9	243.4	281.6	254.6	253.9	184.0	154.0	160.7	181.0	
Berlin	Germany	515.2	37.2	30.1	39.3	33.7	52.6	60.2	52.5	53.0	39.5	32.2	37.8	46.1	
Cologne	Germany	802.1	61.7	53.8	55.0	48.2	62.1	86.3	87.4	83.3	66.9	64.7	63.5	69.2	
Frankfurt	Germany	598.5	44.0	38.6	38.7	36.6	60.4	55.4	63.5	61.4	47.7	50.4	47.3	54.5	
Hamburg	Germany	776.6	70.7	57.7	56.7	39.3	55.8	72.0	83.2	79.2	62.1	62.5	59.7	77.7	
Magdeburg	Germany	515.8	38.3	26.1	34.9	27.8	56.1	51.8	60.9	59.4	43.3	40.0	36.8	39.5	
Oberstdorf	Germany	1,801.2	125.8	111.8	127.6	121.0	139.9	210.1	229.1	199.8	145.2	114.6	141.8	134.5	
Athens	Greece	433.1	55.6	44.4	45.6	27.6	20.7	11.6	10.7	5.4	25.8	38.6	70.8	76.3	
Heraklion	Greece	483.2	90.1	67.6	58.2	28.5	14.2	3.5	1.0	0.6	17.7	64.9	59.0	77.9	
Kerkyra	Greece	1,097.3	136.6	124.6	98.1	66.7	37.0	14.1	9.2	19.0	81.3	137.7	187.4	185.6	
Thessaloniki	Greece	435.5	32.2	38.8	37.6	38.4	40.3	27.5	22.3	22.4	25.2	43.8	60.2	46.5	
Piraeus	Greece	331.9	42.0	36.3	34.1	30.3	16.0	5.1	5.6	3.1	11.4	30.5	58.9	58.8	
Xerokampos	Greece	219.5	49.0	39.2	29.6	7.6	5.4	5.5	0.3	0.7	2.6	21.6	18.5	39.5	
Budapest	Hungary	532.0	37.0	29.0	30.0	42.0	62.0	63.0	45.0	49.0	40.0	39.0	53.0	43.0	
Miskolc	Hungary	643.9	28.0	35.3	31.3	47.4	67.0	85.0	91.1	64.6	53.8	56.8	44.6	39.0	
Pécs	Hungary	670.9	31.2	37.4	33.6	43.6	81.3	82.8	69.4	63.5	71.6	57.3	51.8	47.4	
Reykjavík	Iceland	843.3	83.0	85.9	81.4	56.0	52.8	43.8	52.3	67.3	73.5	74.4	78.8	94.1	
Vík í Mýrdal	Iceland	2,252.5	203.1	178.6	184.7	155.9	137.7	171.7	151.7	211.0	214.4	242.2	195.3	206.2	
Dublin	Ireland	758.0	62.6	48.8	52.7	54.1	59.5	66.7	56.2	73.3	59.5	79.0	72.9	72.7	
Valentia Island	Ireland	1,557.4	173.8	123.7	123.8	96.7	93.5	95.3	99.0	114.9	125.4	177.1	169.3	164.9	
Bari	Italy	466.6	50.8	37.0	41.0	42.0	30.4	29.4	17.8	13.3	41.7	53.9	62.0	47.4	
Bolzano	Italy	711.5	23.5	22.8	36.9	50.2	75.2	84.6	92.3	86.2	70.9	84.4	49.9	34.6	
Cagliari	Italy	413.4	37.1	33.9	32.1	45.6	26.2	12.5	3.1	11.4	38.5	43.9	74.0	54.9	
Campobasso	Italy	673.5	66.4	51.2	57.3	62.4	58.2	49.8	34.9	39.3	57.5	58.6	76.8	61.0	
Florence	Italy	872.6	60.5	63.7	63.5	86.4	70.0	57.1	36.7	56.0	79.6	104.2	113.6	81.3	
Naples	Italy	1,008.2	92.1	95.3	77.9	98.6	59.0	32.8	28.5	35.5	88.9	135.5	152.1	112.0	
Palermo	Italy	855.4	97.5	109.9	78.2	65.1	36.2	17.9	6.7	31.8	65.3	105.6	117.5	123.7	
Pescara	Italy	639.2	49.6	46.2	54.6	46.0	30.6	47.2	31.1	41.6	63.0	69.0	85.0	75.3	
Rome	Italy	798.5	69.5	75.8	59.0	76.2	49.1	40.7	21.0	34.1	71.8	107.0	109.9	84.4	
Tarvisio	Italy	1,417.0	69.1	66.7	93.3	132.9	123.7	154.3	141.2	119.4	140.0	153.8	131.1	91.5	
Turin	Italy	981.0	47.8	47.1	72.5	113.3	145.3	104.3	70.5	76.1	83.8	106.1	69.1	45.1	
Riga	Latvia	620.9	33.7	27.0	27.9	41.1	42.5	59.9	74.3	73.1	78.9	60.2	57.3	46.0	
Vilnius	Lithuania	653.8	38.9	34.4	37.0	46.2	52.1	72.7	79.3	75.8	65.2	51.5	51.5	49.2	
Luxembourg City	Luxembourg	896.9	76.9	62.4	69.2	58.1	76.5	81.7	71.0	75.8	75.4	86.9	76.5	86.4	
Valletta	Malta	595.8	98.5	60.1	44.2	20.7	16.0	4.6	0.3	12.8	58.6	82.9	92.3	109.2	
Chișinău	Moldova	548.0	36.0	31.0	34.0	40.0	50.0	66.0	65.0	55.0	50.0	42.0	39.0	40.0	
Monaco	Monaco	743.6	67.7	48.4	41.2	71.3	49.0	32.6	13.7	26.5	72.5	128.7	103.2	88.8	
Podgorica	Montenegro	1,659.3	191.6	166.5	159.0	145.2	89.8	63.3	38.5	65.9	119.6	164.2	238.5	217.2	
Cetinje	Montenegro	3,303.1	429.5	351.1	368.9	277.3	157.4	100.6	66.3	112.3	191.0	293.0	499.9	455.8	
Amsterdam	Netherlands	838.2	66.6	50.6	60.6	40.9	55.6	66.0	76.5	85.9	82.4	89.6	87.2	76.3	
Skopje	North Macedonia	483.0	30.0	29.0	38.0	40.0	43.0	54.0	38.0	36.0	34.0	49.0	45.0	48.0	
Bergen	Norway	2,412.8	252.7	197.8	200.3	133.7	104.5	119.4	151.1	198.4	254.9	270.8	261.4	267.8	
Oslo	Norway	802.7	54.9	41.0	50.4	46.9	54.1	70.5	84.7	97.8	80.6	90.4	79.1	52.4	
Tromsø	Norway	1,090.6	108.3	96.7	96.7	71.1	56.5	58.0	72.5	88.0	111.3	127.4	94.4	109.7	
Warsaw	Poland	529.0	27.0	26.0	31.0	34.0	56.0	69.0	73.0	64.0	46.0	32.0	37.0	34.0	
Aveiro	Portugal	944.0	119.8	87.5	67.2	91.2	74.9	29.3	13.5	19.7	49.3	128.8	128.3	134.5	
Braga	Portugal	1,448.6	176.4	114.8	121.6	130.8	112.9	48.6	22.0	34.0	81.7	191.7	193.9	220.2	
Faro	Portugal	511.6	59.7	52.0	39.4	38.8	21.6	4.3	1.8	3.9	22.5	60.6	91.2	115.8	
Lisbon	Portugal	774.0	99.9	84.9	53.2	68.1	53.6	15.9	4.2	6.2	32.9	100.8	127.6	126.7	
Porto	Portugal	1,237.0	147.1	110.5	95.6	117.6	89.6	39.9	20.4	32.9	71.9	158.3	172.0	181.0	
Viana do Castelo	Portugal	1,466.3	180.8	131.0	112.5	125.9	99.0	52.0	29.1	38.5	94.5	190.0	199.9	213.3	
Bacău	Romania	618.4	24.3	24.8	33.4	49.9	72.5	99.3	97.3	49.0	52.3	50.9	33.1	31.6	
Bucharest	Romania	643.0	37.0	37.0	44.0	50.0	56.0	83.0	70.0	56.0	64.0	53.0	46.0	48.0	
Constanța	Romania	429.9	27.6	24.0	34.0	31.8	37.9	40.4	37.5	35.2	42.1	36.8	45.6	37.0	
Râmnicu Vâlcea	Romania	727.8	38.7	30.3	39.9	57.4	82.0	100.7	83.7	77.7	58.3	58.6	49.1	51.4	
Sulina	Romania	240.5	16.0	11.9	17.4	14.0	20.3	28.3	18.9	23.5	21.5	24.3	22.7	21.7	
Timișoara	Romania	593.0	40.0	36.0	37.0	48.0	65.0	76.0	64.0	50.0	40.0	39.0	48.0	50.0	
Astrakhan	Russia	231.0	15.0	12.0	17.0	25.0	28.0	25.0	22.0	17.0	16.0	19.0	17.0	18.0	
Kaliningrad	Russia	816.0	68.0	54.0	49.0	38.0	52.0	69.0	91.0	91.0	73.0	86.0	76.0	69.0	
Kazan	Russia	565.0	46.0	37.0	38.0	34.0	38.0	57.0	62.0	55.0	50.0	54.0	45.0	40.0	
Moscow	Russia	714.0	53.0	44.0	39.0	37.0	61.0	78.0	84.0	78.0	66.0	70.0	52.0	51.0	
Saint Petersburg	Russia	670.0	46.0	36.0	36.0	37.0	47.0	69.0	84.0	87.0	57.0	64.0	56.0	51.0	
Saratov	Russia	466.0	43.0	36.0	33.0	31.0	36.0	48.0	44.0	27.0	50.0	38.0	39.0	41.0	
Sochi	Russia	1,703.0	184.0	135.0	121.0	120.0	110.0	104.0	128.0	121.0	127.0	167.0	201.0	185.0	
Vladikavkaz	Russia	955.0	31.0	34.0	62.0	94.0	148.0	181.0	112.0	90.0	71.0	62.0	40.0	30.0	
Belgrade	Serbia	690.9	46.9	40.0	49.3	56.1	58.0	101.2	63.0	58.3	55.3	50.2	55.1	57.4	
Niš	Serbia	580.3	38.8	36.8	42.5	56.6	58.0	57.3	44.0	46.7	48.0	45.5	54.8	51.5	
Bratislava	Slovakia	565.0	39.0	37.0	38.0	34.0	55.0	57.0	53.0	59.0	55.0	38.0	54.0	46.0	
Košice	Slovakia	613.0	25.7	26.8	23.6	42.4	69.4	87.5	93.5	66.5	50.1	51.1	40.2	36.1	
Prešov	Slovakia	647.9	21.7	24.8	24.1	43.2	82.8	95.0	110.2	76.8	56.7	53.8	33.0	25.9	
Bovec	Slovenia	2,603.0	141.0	106.0	163.0	203.0	221.0	203.0	187.0	200.0	267.0	324.0	331.0	257.0	
Ljubljana	Slovenia	1,362.0	69.0	70.0	88.0	99.0	109.0	144.0	115.0	137.0	147.0	147.0	129.0	107.0	
Almería	Spain	200.0	24.0	25.0	16.0	17.0	12.0	5.0	1.0	1.0	14.0	27.0	28.0	30.0	
Barcelona	Spain	588.0	37.0	35.0	36.0	40.0	47.0	30.0	21.0	62.0	81.0	91.0	59.0	40.0	
Bilbao	Spain	1,134.0	120.0	86.0	90.0	107.0	78.0	60.0	50.0	76.0	73.0	111.0	147.0	122.0	
Madrid	Spain	423.0	33.0	35.0	25.0	45.0	51.0	21.0	12.0	10.0	22.0	60.0	58.0	51.0	
Santiago de Compostela	Spain	1,787.0	210.0	167.0	146.0	146.0	135.0	72.0	43.0	57.0	107.0	226.0	217.0	261.0	
Seville	Spain	539.0	66.0	50.0	36.0	54.0	31.0	10.0	2.0	5.0	27.0	68.0	91.0	99.0	
Valencia	Spain	475.0	37.0	36.0	33.0	38.0	39.0	22.0	8.0	20.0	70.0	77.0	47.0	48.0	
Zaragoza	Spain	322.0	21.0	22.0	19.0	39.0	44.0	26.0	17.0	17.0	30.0	36.0	30.0	21.0	
Gothenburg	Sweden	912.2	83.0	61.0	54.0	51.3	54.3	73.7	81.4	92.8	80.0	102.9	84.7	93.1	
Stockholm	Sweden	546.4	37.0	29.4	27.3	29.2	34.0	61.7	61.5	66.2	53.3	51.4	47.6	47.8	
Zürich	Switzerland	1,134.0	63.0	64.0	78.0	83.0	122.0	128.0	124.0	124.0	99.0	86.0	79.0	83.0	
Geneva	Switzerland	946.0	72.8	55.9	62.1	67.1	78.5	83.2	79.2	81.2	90.7	96.5	88.6	89.9	
Sion	Switzerland	583.0	51.8	40.4	36.9	33.7	52.0	48.2	61.9	59.6	37.6	42.8	50.4	67.7	
Lugano	Switzerland	1,566.6	65.5	61.3	75.5	138.0	177.6	171.5	157.9	158.2	164.9	149.7	166.6	79.9	
Locarno	Switzerland	1,855.1	69.6	64.5	94.9	166.3	189.6	186.8	162.9	211.6	203.1	209.5	207.7	88.6	
Camedo	Switzerland	2,284.7	80.7	72.8	115.7	229.5	244.5	210.3	157.9	226.4	278.2	290.1	284.7	93.9	
Edirne	Turkey	601.9	65.2	52.8	50.1	47.9	52.3	47.3	32.0	23.3	36.2	57.4	66.8	70.6	
Istanbul	Turkey	849.6	99.5	82.1	69.2	43.1	31.5	40.6	39.6	41.9	64.4	102.3	110.3	125.1	
Kyiv	Ukraine	620.7	35.7	38.6	36.4	46.2	58.1	82.7	71.8	60.4	58.2	39.7	48.8	44.1	
Belfast	United Kingdom	862.4	86.9	59.7	68.1	56.9	56.3	60.8	66.2	76.5	80.1	88.0	79.6	88.3	
Capel Curig	United Kingdom	2,697.1	309.6	258.2	213.4	155.8	142.0	144.1	157.6	189.7	206.3	274.0	300.4	346.0	
Cardiff	United Kingdom	1,203.5	127.0	93.0	85.3	72.1	78.5	73.5	83.6	104.8	86.3	129.1	130.7	139.6	
Edinburgh	United Kingdom	704.3	67.5	47.0	51.7	40.5	48.9	61.3	65.0	60.2	63.7	75.6	62.1	60.8	
Glasgow	United Kingdom	1,370.4	157.3	125.0	112.4	73.2	71.9	80.8	91.9	107.1	109.4	135.7	145.0	160.7	
Liverpool	United Kingdom	824.3	69.4	57.1	53.3	49.8	52.5	64.4	65.5	72.1	76.6	89.7	82.2	91.9	
London	United Kingdom	601.7	55.2	40.9	41.6	43.7	49.4	45.1	44.5	49.5	49.1	68.5	59.0	55.2	
Gibraltar	United Kingdom (Overseas territories)	740.8	97.5	93.6	83.4	68.8	26.9	8.5	0.7	1.1	25.6	84.9	99.1	150.7	
Simferopol	Crimea	501.0	42.0	34.0	36.0	33.0	40.0	58.0	39.0	47.0	40.0	45.0	44.0	43.0	

== North America ==
Average monthly precipitation (in mm) for selected cities in North America
City	Country	Year	Jan	Feb	Mar	Apr	May	Jun	Jul	Aug	Sep	Oct	Nov	Dec	Ref.
St. John's	Antigua and Barbuda	1049.4	56.5	44.9	46.0	72.0	89.6	62.0	86.5	99.4	131.6	142.2	135.1	83.4	
Oranjestad	Aruba	451.1	44.0	19.5	10.0	8.6	14.1	17.4	19.6	31.4	42.9	76.5	87.1	80.1	
Nassau	The Bahamas	1,426.0	45.0	48.0	54.0	74.0	139.0	220.0	158.0	211.0	196.0	151.0	87.0	43.0	
Hamilton	Bermuda	1,453.8	127.6	123.6	118.9	86.8	94.6	110.2	116.2	165.2	145.2	149.2	111.6	104.8	
Kingston	Jamaica	813.0	18.0	19.0	20.0	39.0	100.0	74.0	42.0	98.0	114.0	177.0	65.0	47.0	
Port Antonio	Jamaica	3,082.0	224.0	144.0	113.0	170.0	299.0	339.0	257.0	250.0	277.0	352.0	359.0	298.0	
Calgary	Canada	445.4	10.0	11.8	17.7	29.6	61.1	112.7	65.7	53.8	37.1	17.1	16.3	12.5	
Montreal	Canada	1,000.3	77.2	62.7	69.1	82.2	81.2	87.0	89.3	94.1	83.1	91.3	96.4	86.8	
Prince Rupert	Canada	2,619.1	276.3	185.6	199.6	172.4	137.6	108.8	118.7	169.1	266.3	373.6	317.0	294.2	
Vancouver	Canada	1189.0	168.4	104.6	113.9	88.5	65.0	53.8	35.6	36.7	50.9	120.8	188.9	161.9	
Acapulco	Mexico	1,336.8	14.8	5.8	2.2	3.2	26.1	263.3	246.9	295.2	309.6	138.8	20.1	10.8	
Monterrey	Mexico	666.6	21.8	17.3	29.1	33.6	53.2	62.6	59.9	72.7	199.7	64.1	30.0	22.5	
Tijuana	Mexico	230.9	43.8	36.5	42.7	17.6	4.4	0.7	0.7	0.9	5.0	7.8	33.8	37.0	
Toluca	Mexico	980.7	10.9	14.6	19.9	33.8	87.2	172.8	198.5	185.9	163.5	65.0	20.6	8.0	
Anchorage	United States	417.4	19.2	21.9	17.5	11.0	16.6	25.8	46.3	74.5	78.7	46.3	30.2	29.4	
Atlanta	United States	1252.6	108.9	117.1	124.5	95.8	79.2	113.1	123.0	100.6	89.4	85.7	99.4	115.9	
Austin	United States	920.6	67.0	48.0	73.2	61.4	128.1	93.4	49.7	69.5	87.7	99.4	74.2	69.0	
Chicago	United States	1,038.0	58.0	54.0	68.0	105.0	121.0	115.0	102.0	104.0	85.0	98.0	69.0	59.0	
Cincinnati	United States	1252.6	74.0	69.4	92.1	113.3	117.7	117.9	98.6	80.3	74.5	81.2	77.5	80.7	
Columbus (Ohio)	United States	1,056.0	76.0	61.0	92.0	98.0	101.0	110.0	119.0	95.0	80.0	74.0	71.0	80.0	
Dallas	United States	973.2	65.8	70.6	87.6	80.0	116.1	97.3	43.4	55.6	78.7	121.7	74.4	82.0	
Denver	United States	390.0	11.7	13.5	28.3	42.5	58.3	42.6	53.8	46.5	38.3	24.7	17.7	12.0	
Des Moines	United States	909.7	28.4	33.3	55.9	98.6	128.0	128.5	96.3	102.9	78.7	71.4	47.8	39.9	
Detroit	United States	872.0	57.0	53.0	62.0	83.0	94.0	84.0	89.0	83.0	82.0	64.0	65.0	57.0	
Los Angeles	United States	362.0	84.0	92.0	57.0	18.0	8.1	2.3	0.5	0.0	0.3	15.0	20.0	63.0	
Miami	United States	1,712.0	46.0	55.0	62.0	85.0	161.0	267.0	187.0	243.0	260.0	194.0	90.0	62.0	
Nashville	United States	1,283.0	102.0	114.0	115.0	120.0	128.0	111.0	106.0	96.0	96.0	85.0	98.0	113.0	
New York City	United States	1,258.0	92.0	81.0	109.0	104.0	101.0	115.0	117.0	116.0	109.0	111.0	91.0	111.0	
Phoenix	United States	183.0	22.0	22.0	21.0	5.5	3.3	0.5	23.0	24.0	14.0	14.0	14.0	19.0	
Portland	United States	938.0	128.0	93.0	101.0	73.0	64.0	41.0	13.0	14.0	39.0	87.0	138.0	147.0	
San Diego	United States	249.0	50.0	56.0	37.0	17.0	7.1	1.3	2.0	0.2	3.0	13.0	20.0	42.0	
San Francisco	United States	501.0	103.1	74.9	78.0	32.8	6.4	3.8	1.0	1.8	6.6	32.0	81.5	78.7	
Seattle	United States	945.0	136.7	101.3	89.9	59.2	43.2	38.1	19.3	29.0	47.8	82.0	148.1	150.1	

== Oceania ==
Average monthly precipitation (in mm) for selected cities in Oceania
City	Country	Year	Jan	Feb	Mar	Apr	May	Jun	Jul	Aug	Sep	Oct	Nov	Dec	Ref.
Adelaide	Australia	537.6	21.2	20.0	24.9	37.6	59.3	77.7	71.1	66.9	59.6	40.0	31.0	28.3	
Babinda	Australia	4,279.4	644.9	744.9	801.0	535.1	348.2	202.1	143.9	113.2	123.5	125.1	190.6	306.9	
Brisbane	Australia	1,040.5	138.1	185.2	131.6	61.3	61.1	63.8	27.5	34.2	26.6	86.3	95.7	129.1	
Canberra	Australia	668.3	62.0	59.7	67.2	63.0	49.9	31.9	48.2	52.2	54.1	64.3	67.3	49.7	
Coober Pedy	Australia	141.0	14.2	15.1	10.7	13.4	10.0	12.1	4.8	7.0	8.6	11.2	15.1	18.8	
Cairns	Australia	1,966.0	388.7	479.0	368.2	175.9	81.2	42.7	35.9	26.6	29.3	63.4	85.1	190.0	
Darwin	Australia	1,832.4	470.7	412.4	313.7	105.1	20.7	2.1	0.9	0.8	14.3	68.9	143.5	279.3	
Hobart	Australia	611.5	46.6	39.2	44.6	49.6	47.4	53.9	51.4	54.0	52.8	62.2	54.1	56.2	
Melbourne	Australia	515.4	39.3	41.4	37.5	42.1	34.3	41.5	32.8	39.3	46.1	48.5	60.1	52.5	
Perth	Australia	729.6	17.8	13.9	19.9	36.7	88.5	124.0	147.1	123.8	81.8	40.9	25.0	10.2	
Sydney	Australia	1,147.1	91.1	131.5	117.5	114.1	100.8	142.0	80.3	75.1	63.4	67.7	90.6	73.0	
Wyndham	Australia	925.4	217.5	216.9	147.9	40.2	8.1	4.7	0.2	0.1	1.5	26.1	57.0	205.2	
Norfolk Island	Australia	1,109.8	80.3	86.5	106.8	95.4	101.5	120.6	122.5	99.6	78.4	62.0	72.0	83.9	
Avarua	Cook Islands	2,206.0	256.0	229.0	219.0	246.0	199.0	128.0	112.0	141.0	138.0	121.0	171.0	246.0	
Rotuma (Ahau)	Fiji	3,489.0	345.0	368.0	348.0	284.0	295.0	246.0	213.0	224.0	236.0	300.0	318.0	312.0	
Suva	Fiji	3,023.0	371.0	265.0	374.0	366.0	270.0	163.0	136.0	158.0	177.0	221.0	245.0	277.0	
Afaʻahiti	French Polynesia	3,374.7	468.8	374.8	339.6	297.7	235.0	186.4	154.5	139.0	178.4	247.5	288.8	464.2	
Papeʻete	French Polynesia	2,065.1	317.5	277.7	240.2	143.1	149.5	80.8	62.7	56.4	64.3	120.9	155.2	396.8	
Rapa Iti	French Polynesia	2,435.9	227.2	204.9	256.3	234.8	172.2	215.4	237.5	209.0	148.1	177.8	143.1	209.6	
Dededo	Guam	2,572.5	133.4	114.3	80.0	93.5	113.1	206.9	310.7	442.3	348.1	318.2	245.6	166.4	
Kiritimati	Kiribati	1,050.9	142.8	84.7	147.5	189.9	91.4	81.6	77.1	50.9	32.2	56.2	36.5	60.1	
Tarawa	Kiribati	2,053.0	271.0	218.0	204.0	184.0	158.0	155.0	168.0	138.0	120.0	110.0	115.0	212.0	
Malem	Micronesia	5,447.0	402.0	490.0	504.0	586.0	493.0	454.0	448.0	416.0	383.0	344.0	415.0	512.0	
Kwajalein	Marshall Islands	2,593.0	115.8	82.0	104.1	191.8	253.5	244.3	265.2	256.8	300.5	302.5	270.8	205.7	
Majuro	Marshall Islands	3,334.0	209.0	194.0	220.0	282.0	272.0	282.0	278.0	284.0	320.0	350.0	341.0	302.0	
Palikir	Micronesia	5,202.0	377.0	279.0	353.0	462.0	502.0	464.0	504.0	515.0	464.0	469.0	421.0	392.0	
Nouméa	New Caledonia	1,034.3	107.2	134.0	167.7	124.2	86.0	82.1	71.8	70.3	38.4	39.1	44.4	68.4	
Yaté	New Caledonia	2,604.9	293.2	320.3	415.8	306.1	201.9	159.2	172.1	141.0	133.2	115.9	119.1	227.1	
Alexandra	New Zealand	359.4	50.1	32.8	29.0	22.0	27.4	31.6	24.2	17.6	20.9	28.7	30.6	44.5	
Auckland	New Zealand	1,212.5	73.3	66.1	87.3	99.4	112.6	126.4	145.1	118.4	105.1	100.2	85.8	92.8	
Hokitika	New Zealand	2,855.5	242.3	178.9	215.0	235.8	242.1	249.3	219.3	231.9	256.5	276.3	239.6	268.5	
Milford Sound	New Zealand	6,427.7	632.8	499.6	601.1	548.1	566.4	424.1	393.9	428.7	540.1	631.3	566.6	595.0	
Wellington	New Zealand	1,250.4	77.5	77.0	85.8	100.9	120.7	132.4	136.0	125.5	100.8	110.3	91.5	92.0	
Koror	Palau	3,758.3	271.8	231.6	208.3	220.2	304.5	438.7	458.2	379.7	301.2	352.3	287.5	304.3	
Daru	Papua New Guinea	2,099.0	302.0	264.0	318.0	320.0	239.0	97.0	76.0	56.0	46.0	58.0	117.0	206.0	
Ialibu	Papua New Guinea	3,539.0	318.0	332.0	367.0	319.0	234.0	189.0	233.0	237.0	315.0	346.0	305.0	344.0	
Kikori	Papua New Guinea	5,611.0	342.0	372.0	331.0	405.0	649.0	677.0	658.0	566.0	599.0	464.0	262.0	286.0	
Lae	Papua New Guinea	4,677.1	280.9	232.6	315.4	399.2	389.2	472.7	503.9	528.3	441.3	445.3	317.2	351.1	
Madang	Papua New Guinea	3,509.0	360.0	312.0	340.0	429.0	371.0	205.0	156.0	134.0	137.0	288.0	375.0	402.0	
Mount Hagen	Papua New Guinea	2,637.8	283.2	299.3	309.1	248.8	179.9	121.8	135.4	162.8	192.7	218.1	207.6	279.1	
Port Moresby	Papua New Guinea	1,170.0	184.0	193.0	212.0	137.0	72.0	48.0	26.0	31.0	33.0	37.0	67.0	130.0	
Apia	Samoa	2,965.0	489.0	368.0	352.1	211.2	192.6	120.8	120.7	113.2	153.9	224.3	261.7	357.5	
Pago Pago	American Samoa	3,259.0	387.0	348.0	278.0	286.0	298.0	162.0	191.0	176.0	203.0	260.0	306.0	364.0	
Gizo	Solomon Islands	3,669.0	413.0	353.0	385.0	292.0	272.0	258.0	367.0	285.0	267.0	247.0	246.0	284.0	
Honiara	Solomon Islands	2,177.0	277.0	287.0	362.0	214.0	141.0	97.0	100.0	92.0	95.0	154.0	141.0	217.0	
Nukuʻalofa	Tonga	1,721.0	174.0	210.0	206.0	165.0	111.0	95.0	95.0	117.0	122.0	128.0	123.0	175.0	
Funafuti	Tuvalu	3,513.6	413.7	360.6	324.3	255.8	259.8	216.6	253.1	275.9	217.5	266.5	275.9	393.9	
Hilo	United States	3,060.0	200.0	260.0	322.0	239.0	178.0	185.0	235.0	287.0	221.0	260.0	366.0	307.0	
Honolulu	United States	416.0	47.0	49.0	60.0	20.0	21.0	13.0	13.0	21.0	22.0	38.0	57.0	55.0	
Port Vila	Vanuatu	2,338.9	320.9	273.7	320.9	255.2	210.3	180.0	94.4	87.4	87.3	134.1	192.3	187.2	
Sola	Vanuatu	4,662.8	421.3	403.1	415.6	535.0	420.4	337.0	280.5	274.6	289.5	349.7	471.5	464.6	
Mata Utu	Wallis and Futuna	3,322.6	381.4	301.3	373.5	287.6	258.4	159.3	186.5	149.9	221.1	330.4	322.9	350.3	

== South America ==
Average monthly precipitation (in mm) for selected cities in South America
City	Country	Year	Jan	Feb	Mar	Apr	May	Jun	Jul	Aug	Sep	Oct	Nov	Dec	Ref.
Bahía Blanca	Argentina	651.2	67.1	67.1	75.2	54.5	41.2	31.5	31.1	34.5	51.6	73.3	56.8	67.3	
Bariloche	Argentina	1,096.5	31.2	29.3	61.7	82.2	173.4	200.8	167.8	129.0	83.1	43.0	51.9	43.1	
Bernardo de Irigoyen	Argentina	2,345.3	184.2	237.3	174.3	196.2	216.4	208.5	159.8	145.8	193.9	245.3	209.7	173.9	
Buenos Aires	Argentina	1,236.3	138.8	127.1	140.1	119.0	92.3	58.8	60.6	64.2	72.0	127.2	117.3	118.9	
Córdoba	Argentina	881.7	141.0	115.9	126.9	66.3	21.3	4.8	13.5	9.7	35.2	71.9	118.3	156.9	
El Calafate	Argentina	171.4	6.5	12.6	20.0	25.1	21.1	18.8	14.7	11.9	12.6	10.8	7.9	9.4	
Los Toldos	Argentina	1,829.2	356.6	310.1	287.7	86.7	27.4	10.5	9.5	12.3	37.2	134.3	221.0	335.9	
Mendoza	Argentina	238.0	47.2	40.8	31.6	18.5	11.0	5.7	5.0	7.9	12.3	11.2	22.1	24.7	
Neuquén	Argentina	200.9	12.9	11.9	23.6	15.3	21.1	23.5	15.9	11.4	19.3	20.3	14.5	11.2	
Puerto Blest	Argentina	3,327.4	118.3	94.9	150.4	255.5	488.6	589.3	463.9	401.7	250.9	218.6	154.6	140.7	
Resistencia	Argentina	1,432.9	161.1	165.6	174.4	202.3	78.4	63.8	30.6	38.0	68.9	134.7	168.2	146.9	
Río Gallegos	Argentina	268.3	27.7	27.1	26.7	26.7	26.9	18.3	19.2	16.9	13.3	16.9	22.7	25.9	
Rosario	Argentina	1,053.5	120.7	127.4	138.4	119.9	57.7	28.3	23.0	35.3	48.0	118.7	108.2	127.9	
San Juan	Argentina	90.7	15.7	18.9	11.2	4.4	4.4	1.6	3.5	3.2	5.6	3.6	7.0	11.6	
Orán	Argentina	1,045.9	216.6	183.7	184.2	70.9	19.8	6.3	4.5	5.4	16.3	60.0	108.1	170.1	
Ushuaia	Argentina	537.0	49.5	42.1	46.8	55.9	47.6	56.4	40.1	36.0	34.5	36.1	41.3	50.7	
Villa la Angostura	Argentina	1,848.3	63.7	44.5	77.8	141.3	207.8	362.4	249.6	226.3	144.3	139.8	123.1	67.7	
Cobija	Bolivia	1,978.6	301.8	314.8	285.0	179.3	112.0	29.5	23.1	47.9	79.5	141.2	201.1	263.4	
La Paz	Bolivia	602.5	133.7	104.7	71.7	31.7	14.3	5.1	7.1	15.2	35.5	38.1	50.5	94.9	
San Ignacio	Bolivia	2,417.6	392.8	387.1	264.5	185.2	145.5	78.7	70.4	39.0	103.1	144.9	242.7	363.7	
Santa Cruz	Bolivia	1,440.2	227.3	206.8	188.4	89.8	28.4	41.7	40.0	72.8	104.2	152.8	131.6	156.4	
Sucre	Bolivia	735.0	150.0	126.0	108.0	46.0	10.0	4.0	2.0	14.0	23.0	56.0	72.0	124.0	
Uyuni	Bolivia	186.9	79.3	37.7	28.5	2.3	0.8	1.8	0.0	1.7	1.8	2.8	3.8	26.4	
Villa Tunari	Bolivia	5,676.0	881.1	760.6	691.0	410.8	333.5	223.2	178.2	154.8	222.2	434.1	607.9	778.6	
Aracaju	Brazil	1,695.3	77.9	85.1	175.7	261.2	333.8	207.2	174.7	113.9	91.4	65.8	52.3	56.3	
Belém	Brazil	3,084.0	384.5	399.5	450.3	424.3	298.4	185.3	153.8	134.8	128.2	129.2	127.4	268.3	
Boa Vista	Brazil	1,754.0	29.1	32.2	39.2	146.5	347.3	335.7	308.1	220.7	98.1	67.1	69.6	60.4	
Brasília	Brazil	1,478.8	206.0	179.5	226.0	145.2	26.9	3.3	1.5	16.3	38.1	141.8	253.1	241.1	
Calçoene	Brazil	4,164.6	579.3	594.6	535.7	608.5	643.1	386.8	205.7	92.4	31.9	40.0	94.9	351.7	
Florianópolis	Brazil	1,768.6	250.6	201.6	179.7	123.5	132.5	75.7	118.0	74.0	141.0	148.9	150.6	172.5	
Fortaleza	Brazil	1,584.0	156.4	187.0	336.9	385.0	229.0	130.0	69.7	20.0	13.6	9.5	9.8	37.1	
João Pessoa	Brazil	2,145.3	75.8	108.4	252.2	349.8	307.3	346.1	346.2	183.5	87.2	35.4	24.9	28.5	
Macapá	Brazil	2,549.7	294.7	343.3	394.2	384.0	319.5	244.7	190.8	92.4	28.0	34.8	69.8	153.5	
Maceió	Brazil	1,867.4	83.0	72.9	117.4	207.5	296.9	353.8	265.2	201.5	120.2	61.6	46.9	40.5	
Manaus	Brazil	2,301.2	287.0	295.1	300.0	319.0	246.9	118.3	75.4	64.3	76.3	104.1	169.2	245.6	
Natal	Brazil	1,691.2	80.7	99.8	200.8	240.5	221.8	348.8	254.0	118.7	54.0	20.6	22.5	29.0	
Paranaguá	Brazil	2,284.3	363.3	304.6	270.7	164.9	121.2	99.8	112.2	82.5	162.8	171.0	196.7	234.6	
Parnaíba	Brazil	1,596.4	142.5	254.8	371.1	405.7	255.1	72.8	37.4	1.1	3.2	3.4	5.6	43.7	
Petrolândia	Brazil	428.1	49.8	69.1	112.0	68.2	22.1	11.0	14.1	2.4	3.2	10.4	14.8	51.0	
Porto Alegre	Brazil	1,425.2	110.1	106.5	92.2	107.3	118.8	141.3	141.3	117.4	141.5	138.3	110.9	99.6	
Porto Velho	Brazil	2,255.1	320.9	316.0	273.9	251.0	126.6	49.6	24.2	36.4	119.9	192.7	225.2	319.1	
Recife	Brazil	2,417.7	108.2	148.2	256.9	337.6	318.5	377.9	388.1	204.8	122.0	63.0	35.7	56.8	
Rio de Janeiro	Brazil	1,069.2	137.1	130.4	135.8	94.9	69.8	42.7	41.9	44.5	53.6	86.5	97.8	134.2	
Salvador	Brazil	2,144.1	138.0	142.0	151.6	309.7	359.9	243.7	175.0	127.4	102.0	114.9	137.1	142.8	
São Luís	Brazil	2,290.2	244.2	373.0	428.0	475.9	316.5	173.3	131.1	29.4	23.3	7.6	10.5	77.4	
São Paulo	Brazil	1,658.3	292.1	257.3	229.1	87.0	66.3	59.7	48.4	32.3	83.3	127.2	143.9	231.3	
Taracuá	Brazil	3,637.6	293.3	275.8	372.4	358.4	406.8	352.3	310.2	259.4	249.1	251.4	236.0	272.5	
Teresópolis	Brazil	2,774.4	401.9	322.6	263.3	226.3	120.7	69.8	83.4	101.3	143.7	264.5	351.5	425.4	
Vitória	Brazil	1,252.3	119.4	78.9	108.2	97.6	85.7	62.3	85.2	40.3	89.8	144.4	164.7	175.8	
Antofagasta	Chile	2.5	0.0	0.0	0.0	0.1	0.3	0.8	0.4	0.4	0.3	0.0	0.1	0.1	
Arica	Chile	1.8	0.3	0.2	0.3	0.0	0.1	0.2	0.4	0.1	0.1	0.0	0.0	0.1	
Armerillo, San Clemente	Chile	2,542.1	21.6	21.2	43.5	138.7	445.8	567.8	467.9	352.3	223.8	127.6	84.2	47.7	
Calama	Chile	5.9	0.4	0.8	0.2	0.1	1.2	2.0	0.6	0.3	0.2	0.1	0.0	0.0	
Caleta Chaihuín	Chile	3,695.1	121.8	105.8	174.5	316.5	538.0	635.3	529.8	454.4	281.9	232.3	171.3	133.5	
Chaitén	Chile	5,091.8	316.9	245.0	356.6	484.0	609.3	650.8	509.6	490.1	386.8	367.1	328.9	346.7	
Concepción	Chile	1,090.3	15.7	15.4	25.4	72.4	182.7	230.7	198.4	153.6	84.1	57.2	33.4	21.3	
Copiapó	Chile	18.8	0.0	0.1	1.2	1.0	1.5	5.6	5.6	3.4	0.3	0.1	0.0	0.0	
La Serena	Chile	86.8	0.2	0.1	0.8	0.9	11.1	20.9	32.3	15.3	3.1	1.6	0.3	0.2	
Puerto Aguirre	Chile	3,673.8	257.0	214.0	263.3	343.5	402.2	396.6	365.2	336.6	278.8	291.5	239.8	285.3	
Puerto Aysén	Chile	2,238.5	159.1	124.6	149.2	200.2	258.5	240.4	237.7	213.4	181.3	149.1	146.3	178.7	
Punta Arenas	Chile	408.2	42.4	30.7	42.2	44.7	40.8	29.4	30.4	32.1	27.1	28.8	28.0	31.6	
Quillagua	Chile	0.05	0.05	0.0	0.0	0.0	0.0	0.0	0.0	0.0	0.0	0.0	0.0	0.0	
Santiago	Chile	341.9	0.6	1.3	6.1	16.3	55.5	83.3	75.9	55.1	27.2	12.9	6.2	1.5	
San Pedro de Atacama	Chile	38.0	4.0	21.0	7.0	0.0	1.0	2.0	0.0	1.0	1.0	0.0	1.0	0.0	
Valdivia	Chile	1,752.9	49.8	38.6	69.6	131.8	256.0	336.0	261.7	226.5	130.0	109.1	84.0	59.8	
Villa Puerto Edén	Chile	5,745.0	507.5	523.1	532.2	525.2	508.7	482.8	499.7	419.2	377.9	447.2	456.7	464.8	
Visviri	Chile	336.0	112.0	87.0	54.0	15.0	2.0	0.0	0.0	1.0	1.0	12.0	16.0	36.0	
Aguadas	Colombia	2,905.1	109.9	131.3	234.1	333.0	356.2	210.8	180.9	195.1	292.2	367.9	303.5	190.2	
Arauca	Colombia	1,867.7	11.9	23.8	50.6	147.2	267.5	304.7	309.6	224.7	187.1	200.1	109.7	30.8	
Armenia	Colombia	2,159.6	166.0	137.8	229.9	253.0	203.9	85.0	67.6	86.5	140.8	253.7	313.1	222.3	
Bahía Solano	Colombia	5,408.6	273.9	170.0	195.0	339.0	482.5	454.2	475.0	571.5	565.0	770.0	639.8	472.7	
Barranquilla	Colombia	820.0	1.0	0.0	1.0	24.0	116.0	85.0	67.0	107.0	154.0	164.0	74.0	27.0	
Bogotá	Colombia	841.3	28.4	45.0	72.8	110.7	107.7	58.7	46.2	44.7	64.4	111.2	93.3	58.2	
Briceño, Antioquia	Colombia	6,528.7	162.3	245.4	297.1	576.5	776.8	732.9	791.8	752.7	684.4	723.4	511.5	273.9	
Buenaventura	Colombia	6,898.2	413.9	290.9	392.7	530.2	618.9	533.3	578.3	666.2	781.2	807.3	713.9	571.4	
Cali	Colombia	1,048.9	74.8	61.2	94.2	139.8	132.9	66.7	47.7	40.3	69.9	119.9	117.9	83.6	
Cartagena	Colombia	1,087.0	1.9	0.5	1.9	22.0	120.3	101.5	119.4	128.9	144.5	238.8	156.9	50.4	
Cúcuta	Colombia	904.2	51.2	42.8	68.3	114.1	85.0	40.2	39.2	45.9	68.2	137.6	131.7	80.1	
Ibagué	Colombia	1,691.6	86.5	109.1	138.2	227.1	228.2	110.6	75.9	78.2	149.9	205.6	173.7	108.6	
Inírida	Colombia	3,328.1	90.9	127.4	118.5	293.7	435.6	504.4	509.1	398.9	297.7	224.3	204.6	123.0	
Junín, Nariño	Colombia	8,811.0	811.5	660.9	779.5	945.0	896.8	720.0	561.7	448.9	614.1	846.2	686.7	839.7	
La Pedrera	Colombia	3,934.1	316.3	270.4	423.8	398.9	426.4	359.9	335.7	293.3	253.9	250.2	304.1	301.2	
La Raya	Colombia	4,590.9	0.9	77.6	105.4	310.1	525.2	487.6	545.7	606.1	498.7	631.4	537.8	264.4	
Leticia	Colombia	3,389.1	366.8	354.6	357.9	376.4	301.9	189.8	158.1	157.9	220.8	257.3	317.5	330.1	
López de Micay	Colombia	15,992.1	940.3	804.4	812.9	1399.0	1556.0	1301.6	997.9	935.5	1931.0	1641.9	1660.2	2011.3	
Manizales	Colombia	1,583.6	103.5	94.0	133.9	176.2	161.9	108.9	74.2	74.2	139.8	209.0	176.5	131.5	
Medellín	Colombia	1,752.3	63.2	81.4	129.1	170.7	213.5	149.4	133.1	139.7	181.8	226.7	158.9	104.8	
Mesopotamia	Colombia	3,506.2	160.3	209.3	258.3	319.3	392.4	356.6	357.2	334.3	394.9	307.0	226.9	189.7	
Mitú	Colombia	3,355.6	257.1	209.5	228.8	331.2	381.5	373.6	385.4	301.2	241.0	234.0	219.0	193.3	
Mocoa	Colombia	3,743.7	200.6	227.1	273.1	383.5	442.3	473.5	411.3	348.0	296.3	237.2	236.0	214.8	
Mutatá	Colombia	5,384.4	185.5	138.2	157.3	365.9	629.9	575.3	496.0	549.6	590.4	680.7	642.8	372.8	
Neiva	Colombia	1,384.3	100.4	123.6	162.5	149.5	94.9	34.8	31.3	19.9	60.5	204.2	232.3	165.9	
Pasto	Colombia	826.5	69.1	65.7	81.1	87.1	77.6	44.7	32.8	25.0	63.9	95.5	101.1	82.9	
Pereira	Colombia	2,424.5	132.7	132.6	220.2	249.3	257.4	196.1	133.5	129.0	195.9	290.5	287.9	199.4	
Popayán	Colombia	2,127.2	199.8	175.7	216.4	200.9	170.7	76.9	54.8	65.9	122.7	252.6	338.5	252.3	
Puerto Carreño	Colombia	2,328.6	11.1	17.0	45.4	156.1	285.3	466.3	487.9	340.9	208.5	167.5	108.8	33.8	
Puerto López	Colombia	249.5	1.9	2.1	2.2	0.4	15.9	7.2	12.3	21.5	27.7	70.4	60.4	27.5	
Quibdó	Colombia	8,130.5	579.3	505.4	526.1	654.6	776.2	761.6	802.6	851.7	702.4	654.0	728.1	588.5	
Restrepo, Meta	Colombia	8,000.7	187.8	220.8	384.4	814.7	1169.1	1028.1	881.8	649.9	702.0	792.8	675.9	493.4	
Riohacha	Colombia	634.0	3.7	1.6	5.5	31.3	75.9	51.2	16.8	50.0	142.6	148.8	75.6	31.0	
San Antonio de Yurumangui	Colombia	9,444.5	684.8	567.2	587.6	819.1	878.3	825.7	780.6	787.8	904.3	950.0	850.5	808.6	
San José del Guaviare	Colombia	2,725.5	44.6	94.0	153.2	319.7	353.6	355.0	334.9	273.1	237.1	235.4	225.0	99.9	
Santa Marta	Colombia	545.2	3.1	2.0	2.3	14.1	55.4	60.7	59.6	70.0	88.3	111.0	63.5	15.2	
Sincelejo	Colombia	1,288.3	20.4	23.1	21.8	119.0	180.0	145.4	124.3	157.6	170.2	164.0	103.9	58.6	
Tumaco	Colombia	2,658.4	341.8	276.8	286.9	330.8	360.1	217.8	166.4	97.1	125.5	113.9	136.2	205.1	
Tutunendo	Colombia	11,596.1	874.2	743.8	764.8	962.8	1062.9	1003.5	1070.9	1092.5	1073.7	1019.4	1020.6	907.2	
Valledupar	Colombia	1,308.2	6.8	28.5	78.1	125.9	181.3	119.1	114.4	140.7	154.8	169.7	148.9	40.0	
Villavicencio	Colombia	4,537.9	63.0	132.2	230.4	520.2	673.8	541.6	460.6	399.6	406.8	498.9	424.5	186.3	
Yopal	Colombia	2,390.1	9.6	53.7	101.3	262.6	360.1	324.5	330.4	276.5	270.3	238.7	134.2	28.2	
Alto Tambo	Ecuador	6,850.4	579.0	550.8	656.8	786.4	814.1	638.9	498.8	377.4	494.9	475.6	438.1	539.6	
El Coca	Ecuador	3,319.0	243.0	279.0	235.0	374.0	329.0	293.0	241.0	185.0	252.0	308.0	309.0	271.0	
Esmeraldas	Ecuador	738.0	134.0	157.0	123.0	81.0	62.0	52.0	27.0	18.0	23.0	16.0	13.0	32.0	
Guayaquil	Ecuador	1,273.7	200.7	332.0	315.7	207.7	62.6	34.0	15.6	1.2	1.5	5.6	29.1	68.0	
Latacunga	Ecuador	515.0	33.0	55.0	61.0	70.0	42.0	30.0	18.0	17.0	31.0	59.0	56.0	43.0	
Loja	Ecuador	892.5	91.8	113.1	126.9	87.8	55.3	57.0	57.7	47.1	47.1	72.7	58.7	77.3	
Macas	Ecuador	2,914.3	216.1	226.2	255.5	318.1	291.2	275.4	224.7	193.6	217.9	242.8	221.9	230.9	
Machala	Ecuador	489.0	71.0	111.0	116.0	69.0	24.0	14.0	12.0	11.0	11.0	16.0	13.0	21.0	
Manta	Ecuador	253.8	40.6	96.5	68.6	25.4	2.5	5.1	5.1	0.8	0.8	0.8	2.5	5.1	
Nanegalito	Ecuador	3,389.1	351.3	371.3	468.1	485.2	330.6	186.9	104.5	103.8	198.5	227.7	257.0	304.2	
Nueva Loja	Ecuador	3,477.0	215.0	228.0	308.0	381.0	360.0	342.0	302.0	223.0	264.0	309.0	299.0	246.0	
Puerto Baquerizo Moreno	Ecuador	577.7	83.4	107.4	106.3	94.9	41.9	32.5	18.8	9.8	7.6	11.0	12.6	51.5	
Puyo	Ecuador	4,536.0	301.0	298.0	429.0	465.0	408.0	457.0	389.0	346.0	365.0	382.0	364.0	332.0	
Quito	Ecuador	1,098.2	82.5	111.0	146.6	171.2	105.5	39.5	21.5	27.7	68.9	114.9	108.5	100.4	
Salinas	Ecuador	117.0	16.0	41.0	37.0	16.0	2.0	1.0	0.0	1.0	1.0	1.0	0.0	1.0	
San Francisco de Borja	Ecuador	3,319.8	263.2	258.2	318.0	339.9	306.7	264.6	251.0	206.0	226.7	279.5	301.1	304.9	
San Lorenzo	Ecuador	2,879.0	269.5	279.1	294.5	368.7	378.0	285.2	230.4	146.1	172.8	143.7	124.3	186.7	
Santo Domingo	Ecuador	3,174.3	459.4	565.8	577.4	572.6	282.1	122.6	76.7	48.9	84.0	81.3	93.9	209.6	
Tena	Ecuador	4,552.6	363.4	342.3	377.9	441.9	421.3	434.4	380.4	290.6	302.5	358.5	411.7	427.7	
Tulcán	Ecuador	941.0	75.0	80.0	92.0	106.0	78.0	58.0	37.0	37.0	51.0	113.0	120.0	94.0	
Cayenne	French Guiana	3,488.2	399.4	334.8	315.4	443.2	600.0	392.2	262.2	135.4	63.2	54.9	135.2	352.3	
Charvein	French Guiana	2,837.8	264.9	240.5	209.1	347.4	446.8	352.0	248.7	165.5	81.9	68.3	140.6	272.1	
Ouanary	French Guiana	3,896.5	492.8	399.1	356.2	501.4	671.3	485.7	233.4	120.5	50.8	71.5	137.1	376.7	
Saül	French Guiana	2,522.7	241.2	259.7	263.1	328.0	351.7	264.9	200.5	135.2	72.1	71.1	125.6	209.6	
Georgetown	Guyana	2,260.3	185.2	88.5	111.0	140.5	285.5	327.7	268.0	201.4	97.5	107.2	185.9	261.9	
Linden	Guyana	3,058.0	207.4	85.5	136.8	264.7	371.6	422.1	390.7	254.0	196.9	196.4	242.1	289.8	
Asunción	Paraguay	1,401.2	147.2	129.2	117.9	166.0	113.3	82.4	39.4	72.6	87.7	130.8	164.4	150.3	
Encarnación	Paraguay	1,759.7	152.2	160.6	142.4	162.2	144.2	135.8	102.7	116.9	149.5	181.7	161.5	150.0	
Filadelfia	Paraguay	724.0	104.0	91.0	73.0	81.0	40.0	28.0	19.0	6.0	27.0	79.0	81.0	85.0	
Arequipa	Peru	96.5	27.5	39.9	20.6	0.6	0.1	0.1	0.0	1.0	0.8	0.2	1.0	4.7	
Cerro de Pasco	Peru	918.0	119.0	139.0	139.0	69.0	33.0	17.0	15.0	17.0	46.0	96.0	101.0	127.0	
Chiclayo	Peru	26.9	5.9	2.4	8.8	4.0	1.3	0.4	0.0	0.3	0.6	0.8	1.9	0.5	
Chontachaca	Peru	5,469.0	677.0	595.0	639.0	492.0	370.0	318.0	277.0	278.0	317.0	488.0	454.0	564.0	
Cusco	Peru	737.0	160.0	132.9	108.4	44.4	8.6	2.4	3.9	8.0	22.4	47.3	78.6	120.1	
Ilo	Peru	1.2	0.1	0.2	0.1	0.0	0.1	0.1	0.2	0.1	0.2	0.0	0.1	0.0	
Iquitos	Peru	2,878.3	279.0	226.7	279.0	309.8	273.7	190.1	181.9	164.6	189.0	241.9	260.2	282.4	
San Gaban District	Peru	6,629.0	966.0	876.0	770.0	458.0	327.0	312.0	384.0	309.0	342.0	488.0	578.0	819.0	
Lima	Peru	6.4	0.8	0.4	0.4	0.1	0.3	0.7	1.0	1.5	0.7	0.2	0.1	0.2	
Piura	Peru	116.4	16.9	19.0	32.4	24.4	15.1	5.0	0.5	0.0	0.0	1.1	0.8	1.2	
Pongo de Caynarachi	Peru	4,496.0	397.0	443.0	510.0	464.0	380.0	297.0	212.0	210.0	278.0	399.0	456.0	450.0	
Pucallpa	Peru	1,667.0	158.0	183.0	217.0	178.0	111.0	78.0	49.0	67.0	105.0	165.0	190.0	166.0	
Puerto Maldonado	Peru	2,167.0	342.6	333.4	274.9	154.2	105.5	57.6	56.8	63.3	98.1	164.4	236.9	279.3	
Quince Mil	Peru	7,353.9	1149.6	915.3	757.7	504.5	392.3	400.2	394.0	304.2	314.5	618.9	689.0	913.7	
Sandia	Peru	2,289.4	364.8	318.5	250.0	171.6	121.2	88.5	78.5	81.9	116.6	181.6	217.7	298.5	
Tacna	Peru	29.3	0.9	0.8	0.2	0.4	1.5	2.3	4.4	5.6	8.8	3.4	0.5	0.5	
Trujillo	Peru	4.3	1.2	0.8	1.8	0.1	0.1	0.0	0.0	0.0	0.0	0.2	0.0	0.1	
Paramaribo	Suriname	2,192.2	207.9	123.9	113.5	202.5	307.5	318.4	241.3	168.2	116.9	94.1	120.8	177.2	
Montevideo	Uruguay	1,142.0	94.0	95.0	106.0	111.0	83.0	89.0	93.0	90.0	92.0	102.0	96.0	91.0	
Rivera	Uruguay	1,604.9	136.4	160.4	133.1	181.9	148.3	110.7	91.2	87.0	130.9	149.4	150.4	125.2	
Barinas	Venezuela	1,647.6	16.4	19.2	46.6	132.6	201.3	275.4	208.4	213.7	221.9	182.9	102.1	27.1	
Caracas	Venezuela	912.8	15.3	13.2	11.4	59.2	81.7	134.1	118.4	123.8	115.4	126.3	72.6	41.4	
Casigua-El Cubo	Venezuela	3,545.9	117.0	125.7	152.1	362.4	398.8	291.4	310.8	340.3	354.4	443.8	392.7	256.5	
Colonia Tovar	Venezuela	1,447.6	23.5	24.8	22.5	93.3	159.1	163.2	185.5	213.4	189.1	182.4	137.1	53.7	
Maracaibo	Venezuela	580.4	5.1	2.7	5.9	52.1	66.8	55.4	26.5	60.0	104.0	114.4	70.6	16.9	
Maracay	Venezuela	925.5	4.9	7.9	19.1	58.9	99.0	106.7	142.6	172.0	143.6	105.3	51.2	14.3	
Mérida	Venezuela	1,784.7	39.8	48.0	62.9	177.4	236.1	163.8	119.4	151.7	228.8	283.5	194.5	78.8	
Mucuchíes	Venezuela	823.0	14.0	13.0	24.0	103.0	117.0	98.0	89.0	92.0	88.0	103.0	64.0	18.0	
Puerto Ayacucho	Venezuela	2,288.6	31.0	43.0	72.4	174.2	300.0	410.2	391.7	303.3	215.8	166.4	137.5	43.1	
San Fernando de Apure	Venezuela	1,414.6	3.0	11.3	21.2	97.5	174.7	251.5	281.7	243.0	163.7	111.8	44.8	10.4	
San Juan de los Morros	Venezuela	1,681.1	54.4	31.1	27.1	86.5	141.4	193.2	230.7	245.4	202.1	208.1	154.1	107.0	
Urimán	Venezuela	3,535.1	82.3	77.3	86.6	231.0	431.1	586.7	581.9	480.4	338.9	258.9	223.9	156.1	
Valencia	Venezuela	1,404.5	55.1	32.5	26.4	71.8	116.0	135.9	183.1	187.1	185.1	194.9	130.6	86.0	

== See also ==
- List of cities by average temperature
- List of cities by sunshine duration
- List of weather records
