= Mesopotamia (disambiguation) =

Mesopotamia is the historical region between the Tigris and Euphrates rivers, largely corresponding with the territory of modern Iraq.

Mesopotamia may also refer to:

== Places ==
=== Middle East ===
- Geographically, the Tigris–Euphrates river system
  - Upper Mesopotamia
  - Lower Mesopotamia
- Mesopotamia (Roman province), a Roman province extant in the 2nd through 7th centuries
- Mesopotamia (theme), a Byzantine province extant in the 10th and 11th centuries
- Mandatory Mesopotamia, the geopolitical entity created in Mesopotamia (Iraq) under British administration in 1920–1921

=== Other locations ===
- Mesopotamia, Argentina, the name of the northeast region of Argentina located between the rivers Paraná and Uruguay
- Mesopotamia, Antioquia, a district in La Unión municipality in Antioquia Department, Colombia.
- Mesopotamia Township, Trumbull County, Ohio, United States
- Mesopotam, a village in Albania
- Mesopotamia, Kastoria, a former municipality in Greece
- Mesopotamia, New Zealand, an area at the head of the Rangitata River
  - Mesopotamia Station, a historic high country farm at Mesopotamia, New Zealand
- Mesopotamia, Oxford, the name of land between two rivers in the Oxford University Parks, England
- Mesopotamia, Saint Vincent and the Grenadines, a village in Saint Vincent and the Grenadines
- Mesopotamia (Belize House constituency), a Belize City-based electoral constituency

== In popular culture ==
- Mesopotamia (EP), an EP by The B-52's; or the title track of that album
- "Mesopotamia", the first track from the album Cruel Melody by Black Light Burns
- "The Mesopotamians", the last track in the album The Else by They Might Be Giants
- "Mesopotamia", the book by Serhii Zhadan

== Other uses ==
- Mesopotamian crow, a bird native to the region of Mesopotamia
- "Mesopotamia", the Japanese name for the 1991 video game Somer Assault
