= San Antonio, Buenaventura =

San Antonio
- Populated center
- Location in Valle del Cauca and Colombia San Antonio (Colombia)
- Coordinates: 3°15′38.4″N 77°15′33.3″W
- Country: Colombia
- Department: Valle del Cauca
- Municipality: Buenaventura municipality
- Elevation: 230 ft (70 m)

Population (2005)
  - Total: 320
- Time zone: UTC-5 (Colombia Standard Time)

San Antonio is a populated center of Colombia in Buenaventura Municipality, Valle del Cauca Department in Colombia. It is surrounded by a very dense tropical rainforest.

== Climate ==
San Antonio has an extremely wet tropical rainforest climate (Af). It is one of the wettest places in the department of Valle del Cauca and one of the wettest in Colombia and in the world.

Climate data for San Antonio
Month	Jan	Feb	Mar	Apr	May	Jun	Jul	Aug	Sep	Oct	Nov	Dec	Year
Mean daily maximum °C (°F)	29.8 (85.6)	30.4 (86.7)	30.5 (86.9)	30.6 (87.1)	30.4 (86.7)	30.1 (86.2)	30.0 (86.0)	30.0 (86.0)	29.8 (85.6)	29.6 (85.3)	29.5 (85.1)	29.6 (85.3)	30.0 (86.0)
Daily mean °C (°F)	25.7 (78.3)	26.0 (78.8)	26.1 (79.0)	26.1 (79.0)	26.1 (79.0)	25.8 (78.4)	25.8 (78.4)	25.7 (78.3)	25.5 (77.9)	25.4 (77.7)	25.5 (77.9)	25.6 (78.1)	25.8 (78.4)
Mean daily minimum °C (°F)	22.5 (72.5)	22.7 (72.9)	22.7 (72.9)	22.8 (73.0)	22.7 (72.9)	22.6 (72.7)	22.4 (72.3)	22.5 (72.5)	22.4 (72.3)	22.3 (72.1)	22.5 (72.5)	22.5 (72.5)	22.6 (72.6)
Average rainfall mm (inches)	684.8 (26.96)	567.2 (22.33)	587.6 (23.13)	819.1 (32.25)	878.3 (34.58)	825.7 (32.51)	780.6 (30.73)	787.8 (31.02)	904.3 (35.60)	950.0 (37.40)	850.5 (33.48)	808.6 (31.83)	9,444.5 (371.82)
Average rainy days	24	19	20	25	27	26	25	26	26	27	25	25	295
