= Los Toldos, Salta =

Coordinates: 22°18′S 64°41′W

Los Toldos (Salta)
- Municipality and village
- Interactive map of Los Toldos (Salta)
- Country: Argentina
- Province: Salta Province
- Time zone: UTC−3 (ART)

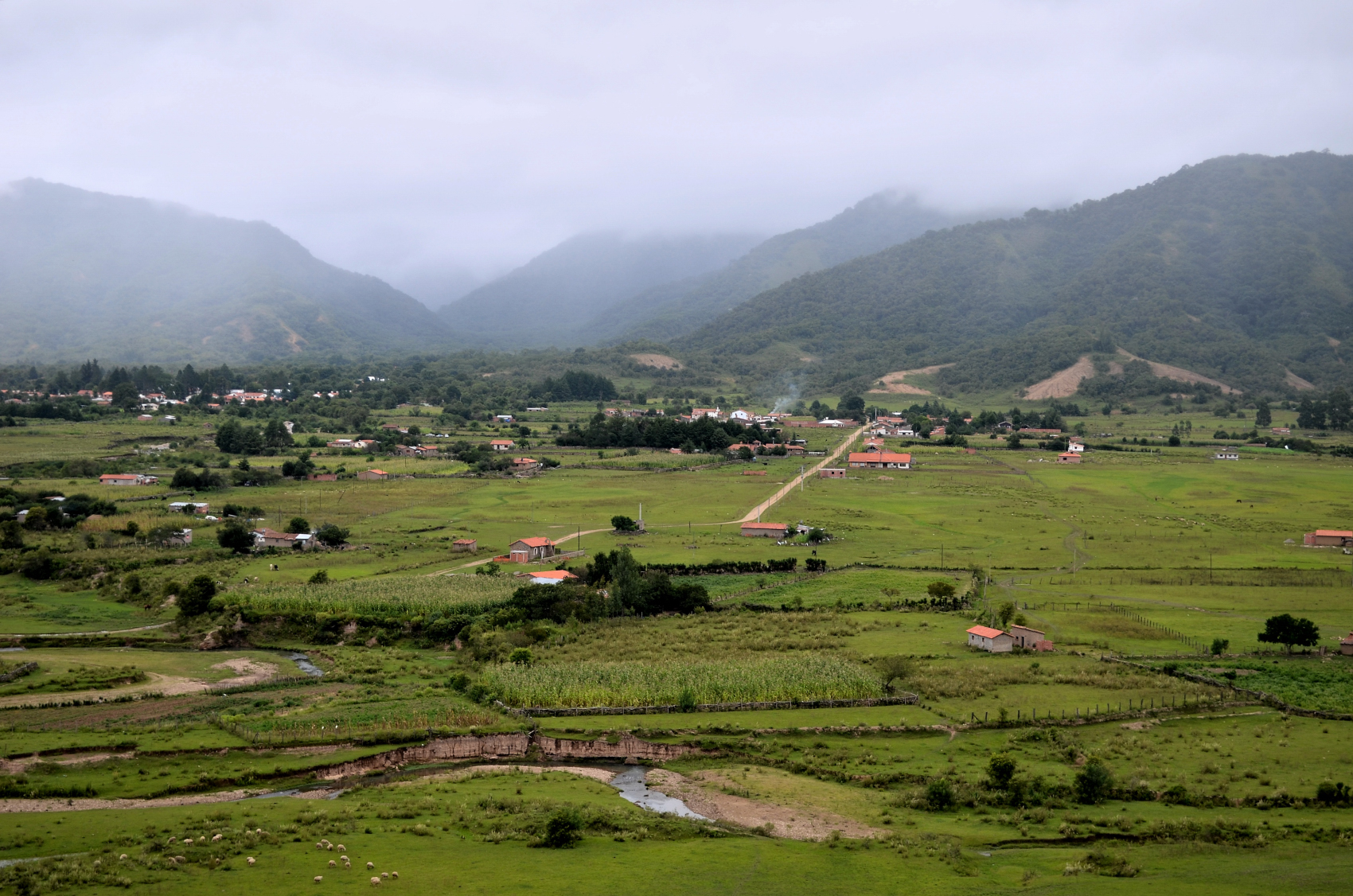
Los Toldos

Los Toldos (Salta) is a village and rural municipality in Salta Province in northwestern Argentina.

== Climate ==
Climate data for Los Toldos, Salta
Month	Jan	Feb	Mar	Apr	May	Jun	Jul	Aug	Sep	Oct	Nov	Dec	Year
Record high °C (°F)	30.6 (87.1)	30.2 (86.4)	30.4 (86.7)	30.6 (87.1)	33.0 (91.4)	33.2 (91.8)	34.7 (94.5)	35.4 (95.7)	35.6 (96.1)	36.0 (96.8)	38.5 (101.3)	31.5 (88.7)	38.5 (101.3)
Mean daily maximum °C (°F)	24.4 (75.9)	23.9 (75.0)	23.1 (73.6)	20.9 (69.6)	18.7 (65.7)	18.7 (65.7)	18.6 (65.5)	20.4 (68.7)	20.6 (69.1)	23.3 (73.9)	23.8 (74.8)	24.6 (76.3)	21.8 (71.1)
Mean daily minimum °C (°F)	14.4 (57.9)	13.9 (57.0)	13.5 (56.3)	10.6 (51.1)	5.4 (41.7)	2.5 (36.5)	1.6 (34.9)	3.4 (38.1)	5.6 (42.1)	9.3 (48.7)	11.9 (53.4)	13.9 (57.0)	8.8 (47.9)
Record low °C (°F)	6.1 (43.0)	7.2 (45.0)	0.4 (32.7)	2.0 (35.6)	−3.6 (25.5)	−7.7 (18.1)	−7.6 (18.3)	−7.0 (19.4)	−6.8 (19.8)	−1.5 (29.3)	2.1 (35.8)	6.8 (44.2)	−7.7 (18.1)
Average precipitation mm (inches)	277.5 (10.93)	261.5 (10.30)	198.8 (7.83)	69.9 (2.75)	16.5 (0.65)	6.7 (0.26)	5.6 (0.22)	7.6 (0.30)	16.3 (0.64)	70.7 (2.78)	130.1 (5.12)	247.1 (9.73)	1,308.3 (51.51)
Average relative humidity (%)	86	85	87	88	86	81	78	77	77	79	82	87	82
Source: Instituto Nacional de Tecnología Agropecuaria
