= Mesopotamia, New Zealand =

Coordinates: 43°38′26.65″S 170°53′48.13″E

Mesopotamia is an area of land at the head of the Rangitata River, east of the Southern Alps and inland from Peel Forest. The area is home to the well known Mesopotamia Station which was established by influential novelist Samuel Butler in 1860 after arriving from England. The name Mesopotamia means "between two rivers."

Much of the station is now managed by the Department of Conservation. Local activities include hunting, tramping, safaris, four wheel driving and jet boating. The area was used as a backdrop for the film series The Lord of the Rings.

== History ==
=== Mesopotamia Station ===
While many attribute the formation of the station with Butler, most parts of the station had been allotted several years before to various individuals. Butler arrived in New Zealand in 1860 and after taking several trips into the Canterbury High Country finally settled on and successfully applied for Run No. 367 in this area. He spent the following winter on the run with his stock, constructing his hut several miles up Forest Creek. The location of where the hut was situated is marked by a plaque today. Butler expanded his holdings over the following years by acquiring neighboring runs and establishing the station. Butler ran the station for approximately four years before selling and returning to England with double his initial investment (£8,000).

The station was sold on numerous occasions to various owners including William Parkerson, Michael and General J. R. Campbell, George McMillan, George Gerard, William Nosworthy. Mesopotamia Station was placed under tenure review in 2003, with 20,863 hectares out of the present 26,115 hectares becoming public conservation land. The remaining land (5,252 hectares) was freeholded to the leaseholder. The current holders of the pastoral lease is the Prouting family who have held it since 1945.

=== Dr. Andrew Sinclair ===
Notable botanist and Colonial Secretary to New Zealand, Doctor Andrew Sinclair drowned while crossing the Rangitata River in 1861. Sinclair is buried on Mesopotamia Station in a marked grave near the river.

=== War memorial ===
Located at the station is a memorial to members of Mesopotamia Station who fought in the Great War. At the breakout of the war the farm manager, the mustering gang, and one of the wagoneers left, with only two of the eight returning. At the 1960 centennial celebration, the Vicar of Geraldine Bob Lowe was approached about a dedicating a memorial plaque to Butler. Knowing the writer's views on Christianity, he gave the committee a book on Butler, which they returned a week later, saying "Think we'd better change that dedication deal, Reverend. We've decided to make it a memorial to those who fell in the First World War." So, as Lowe speculates, "It might have some claim to being the last memorial ever erected to the fallen of the 1914–18 war."

== Buildings ==
A school was constructed at the station in 1956 but closed in 1999.

The remains of Butler's cob cottage can be found beside the former school.

Throughout the area are numerous private and public huts, as well as the remnants of past huts.

== Climate ==
Climate data for Mesopotamia, elevation 516 m (1,693 ft), (1991–2020)
Month	Jan	Feb	Mar	Apr	May	Jun	Jul	Aug	Sep	Oct	Nov	Dec	Year
Average rainfall mm (inches)	70.0 (2.76)	50.4 (1.98)	52.9 (2.08)	64.0 (2.52)	85.7 (3.37)	87.1 (3.43)	72.7 (2.86)	83.7 (3.30)	94.1 (3.70)	103.6 (4.08)	66.4 (2.61)	73.8 (2.91)	904.4 (35.6)
Source: NIWA
