= Mesopotamia, Antioquia =

Mesopotamia
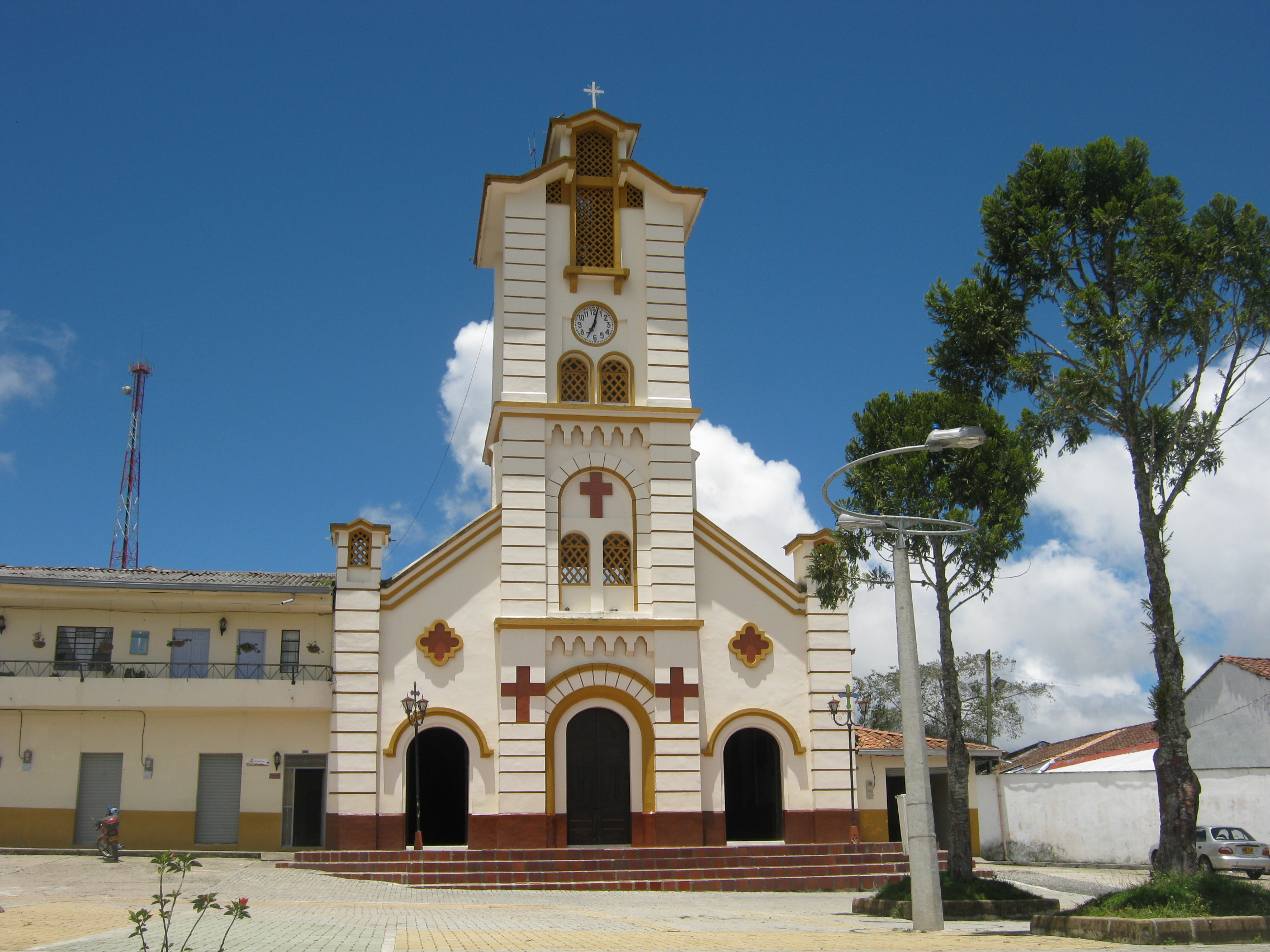
- Church of Mesopotamia, La Unión

- Location in Colombia
- Coordinates: 5°53′10.9″N 75°19′7.1″W
- Country: Colombia
- Department: Antioquia Department
- Municipality: La Unión, Antioquia
- Elevation: 7,592 ft (2,314 m)
- Time zone: UTC-5

Mesopotamia is a district of the municipality of La Unión in the department of Antioquia in Colombia.

Mesopotamia was formed on the site where an inn was established for the muleteers, on the old road that led from Sonsón to La Ceja. It was founded as a fraction in 1865 and belonged to La Ceja. In 1871 it was created as a vice-parish, it was elevated to the category of fraction, it was part of the Department of the South, whose capital was Salamis. This fraction did not come into operation and in 1873, it was created as a Police inspection, later suppressed and re-established in 1881. In 1878, it had been erected as a district of La Ceja. For 1884, Manuel Uribe Ángel describes it like this: "On the back of a hill, between the waters of the Ox and San Miguel rivers, is the hamlet head of the Mesopotamia Fraction".

In 1911, when the Municipality of La Unión was created, it was annexed.

== General ==
It has a police station, a chapel and a house of culture.

It is located approximately 25 kilometers from the main park of the municipality of La Unión, and 2 hours by car from the city of Medellín; the road is entirely paved. Several waterfalls on the edge of the road are the prelude to reaching the township with a biblical name.

It has 4 sidewalks Cardal, Minitas, El Buey, San Miguel Abajo and the populated center.

Vereda Cardal: 22 km from the municipal capital, the road is paved, its terrain is undulating, the predominant economy is potatoes and blackberry crops. It has a school and tourist sites such as the natural baths of the Cardal River.

Vereda Minitas: 18 km from the municipal seat, the road is in solid material or 21 km paved, its land is steep, the potato is the predominant economy.

Vereda San Miguel Abajo: 16 km from the municipal seat, the road is in solid material, its terrain is undulating and steep, the economy predominantly potato and cape gooseberry. It has a school, community booth, and chapel under construction.

== Communication routes ==
It is communicated by paved road with the municipalities of La Unión and Sonsón .

And by uncovered road with the municipalities of Abejorral (by 2 routes), with the municipality of La Ceja, the municipality of La Unión and with the township of San José and the hamlet of La Honda.

== Climate ==
Mesopotamia has a relatively cold subtropical highland climate (Cfb). It has very heavy rainfall year-round.

Climate data for Mesopotamia
Month	Jan	Feb	Mar	Apr	May	Jun	Jul	Aug	Sep	Oct	Nov	Dec	Year
Mean daily maximum °C (°F)	20.0 (68.0)	20.3 (68.5)	20.5 (68.9)	20.6 (69.1)	20.8 (69.4)	20.5 (68.9)	20.4 (68.7)	20.6 (69.1)	20.5 (68.9)	20.3 (68.5)	20.2 (68.4)	20.1 (68.2)	20.4 (68.7)
Daily mean °C (°F)	14.5 (58.1)	14.8 (58.6)	14.9 (58.8)	15.2 (59.4)	15.3 (59.5)	15.2 (59.4)	14.9 (58.8)	15.0 (59.0)	14.9 (58.8)	14.7 (58.5)	14.6 (58.3)	14.6 (58.3)	14.9 (58.8)
Mean daily minimum °C (°F)	9.9 (49.8)	10.2 (50.4)	10.4 (50.7)	10.6 (51.1)	10.6 (51.1)	9.9 (49.8)	9.6 (49.3)	9.7 (49.5)	10.1 (50.2)	10.2 (50.4)	10.2 (50.4)	10.1 (50.2)	10.1 (50.2)
Average rainfall mm (inches)	160.3 (6.31)	209.3 (8.24)	258.3 (10.17)	319.3 (12.57)	392.4 (15.45)	356.6 (14.04)	357.2 (14.06)	334.3 (13.16)	394.9 (15.55)	307.0 (12.09)	226.9 (8.93)	189.7 (7.47)	3,506.2 (138.04)
Average rainy days	20.7	19.6	23.3	25.2	25.8	21.9	19.9	20.6	24.7	25.6	24.7	21.9	273.9
Average relative humidity (%)	87	87	87	88	87	85	84	83	86	87	88	88	86
Mean monthly sunshine hours	170.5	143.9	136.4	117.0	145.7	171.0	217.0	207.7	165.0	124.0	123.0	148.8	1,870
Mean daily sunshine hours	5.5	5.1	4.4	3.9	4.7	5.7	7.0	6.7	5.5	4.0	4.1	4.8	5.1
Source: IDEAM
