= Climate of Europe =

Köppen-Geiger climate classification map of Europe 1991–2020 (Note: The 0 °C (32 °F) coldest-month isotherm is being used for dividing C and D climates in this map.)

Europe is generally characterized by a temperate climate. Most of Western Europe has an oceanic climate, in the Köppen climate classification, featuring cool to warm summers and cool winters with frequent overcast skies. Southern Europe has a distinctively Mediterranean climate, which features warm to hot, dry summers and cool to mild winters and frequent sunny skies. Central-eastern Europe is classified as having a humid continental climate, which features warm to hot summers and cold winters.

The coastal lowlands of the Mediterranean Basin have more of a wet winter and dry summer season pattern, the winter season extends from October to February while the summer season is mainly noticeable in the dry months where precipitation can, in some years, become extremely scarce. A very small area in the continent features the desert climate which exists in the south-eastern coasts of Spain making them the only places in Europe that have an arid climate.

== Gulf Stream ==
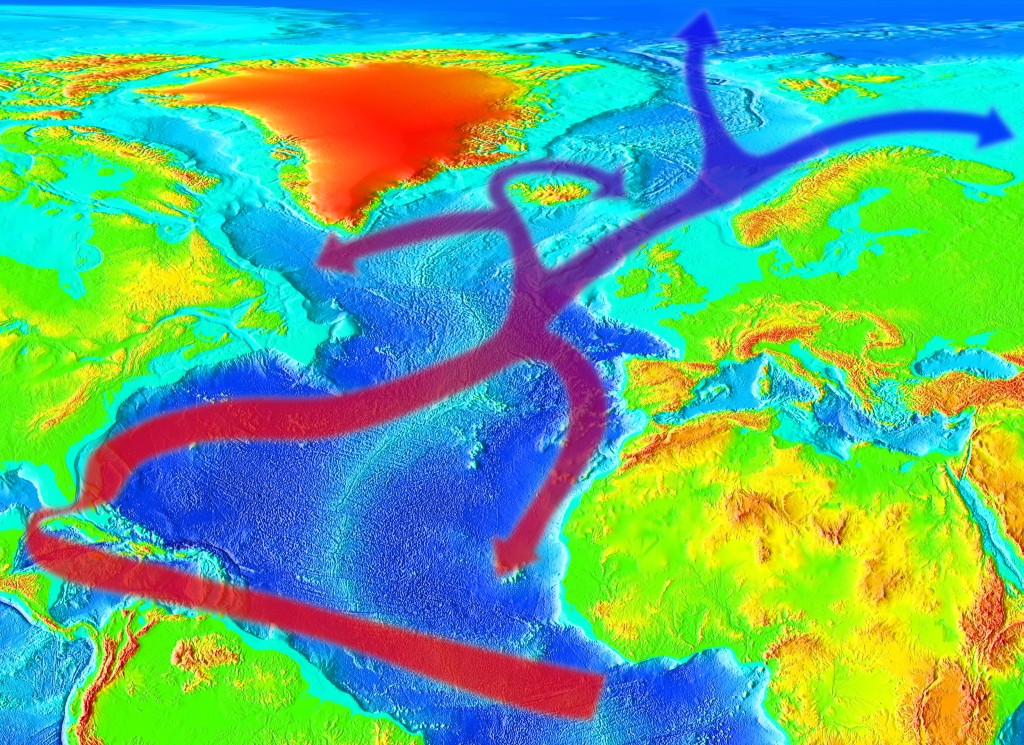
An image of the Gulf Stream's path and its related branches

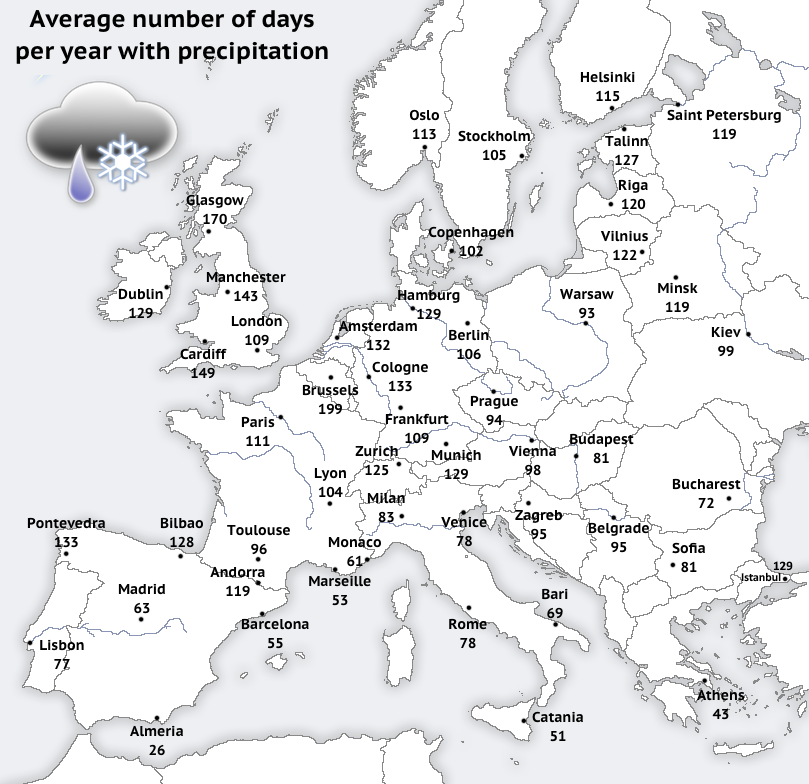
The average number of days per year with precipitation

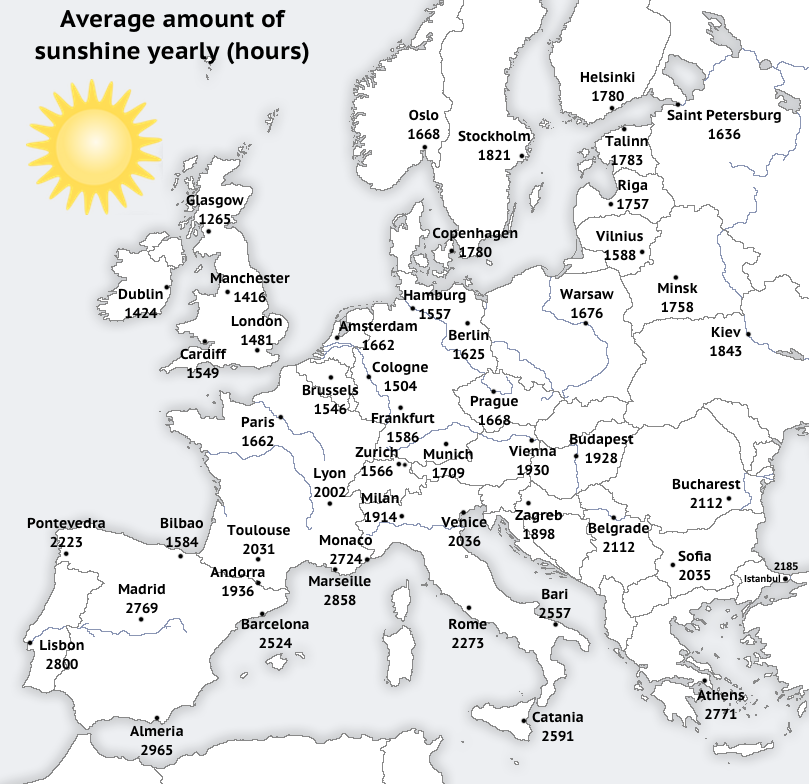
The average amount of sunshine yearly (hours)

The climate of western Europe is strongly conditioned by the Gulf Stream, which keeps mild air (for the latitude) over Northwestern Europe in the winter months, especially in Ireland, the United Kingdom and coastal Norway. In terms of monthly sunshine averages, much of temperate Europe sees considerably less than the northern United States and eastern Asia.

The climate of Western Europe is milder in comparison to other areas of the same latitude around the globe due to the influence of the Gulf Stream. Western Europe is at the same latitude as parts of Canada and Russia, thus solar insulation is weak much of the year. Mediterranean waters are not as deep as the large oceans, allowing it to become a heat storage tempering winters along its coastlines, but because the Atlantic Ocean is largely influenced by the gulf stream, this effect is reduced when compared to that of the Atlantic waters. The Gulf Stream is nicknamed "Europe's central heating", because it makes Europe's climate warmer and wetter than it would otherwise be.

Compared to areas located in the higher middle latitudes, parts of western Europe have milder winters and higher annual temperatures (though summers are cooler than locations at the same latitude). Berlin, Germany; Calgary, Canada; and Irkutsk, in the Asian part of Russia, lie on around the same latitude; January temperatures in Berlin average around 8 °C (15 °F) higher than those in Calgary (although Calgary sits 1200m higher in altitude), and they are almost 22 °C (40 °F) higher than average temperatures in Irkutsk.

This difference is even larger on the northern part of the continent. The January average in Brønnøysund, Norway, is almost 15 °C warmer than the January average in Nome, Alaska, both towns are situated upwind on the west coast of the continents at 65°N, and as much as 42 °C warmer than the January average in Yakutsk which is actually slightly further south.

Within mainland Spain, the arid climate appears predominantly in Almería. This climate extends to the Andarax and Almanzora river valleys, the Punta Entinas-Sabinar Natural Park and the Cabo de Gata-Níjar Natural Park, which are also known for having also a hot desert climate (Köppen: BWh) and a hot semi-desert climate (Köppen: BSh), with a precipitation amount of 156 mm (6.1 in) and an average temperature of 19.1 °C (66 °F) which is reportedly the driest place in Europe.

== Temperature ==
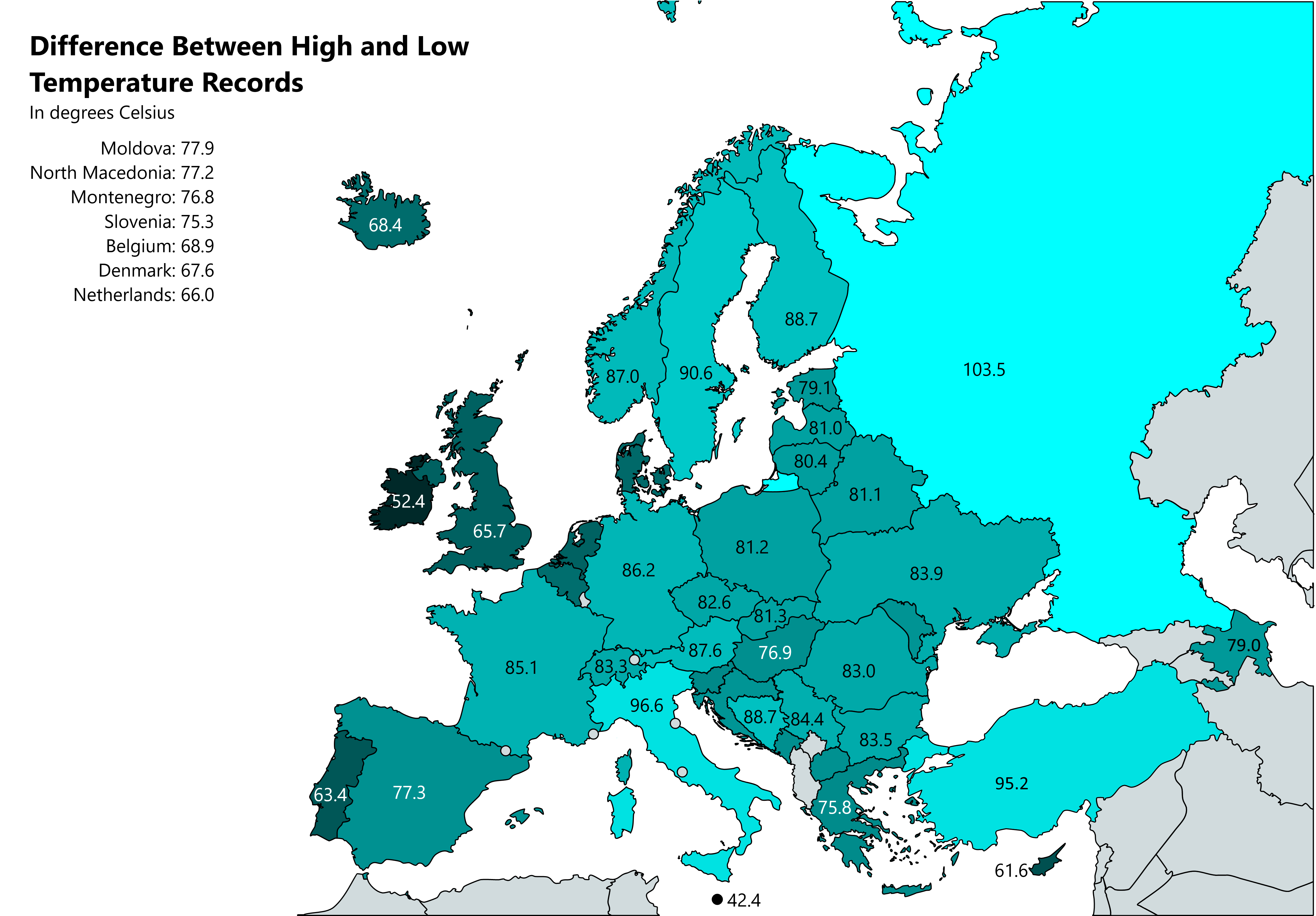
Difference between high and low temperature records

Most of Europe sees seasonal temperatures consistent with temperate climates in other parts of the world, though summers north of the Mediterranean Sea are cooler than most temperate climates experience in summer (for example summers in the temperate sector of the northern United States are much hotter than in Europe). Among the cities with a population over 100,000 people in Europe, the coldest winters are mostly found in Russia, with daily highs in winter averaging 0 °C (32 °F), while the mildest winters in the continent are in southern Portugal, southern Spain, in Sicily (Italy) and southern Greek islands such as Crete, Rhodes, Karpathos and Kasos.

The hottest summers on the continent occur in cities and towns in the interior of southern Spain, located within the Guadalquivir Valley. Average highs in July and August varies from 36 °C (97 °F) in the city of Seville to above 37 °C (99 °F) in Córdoba and up to 39 °C (102 °F) in Montoro, also in the province of Córdoba.

The highest extreme temperatures have been recorded in Syracuse, Italy, with 48.8 °C (119.8 °F). Athens and Elefsina, Greece, with 48.0 °C (118.4 °F)

=== Heat waves ===
Heat waves across the continent can be deadly and consequential events, capable of contracting the European economy by 0.3–0.5%. In the summer of 2003, there was a severe heatwave across Europe, considered the warmest summer on the continent since 1540. The heat and drought killed 72,210 people across 15 countries, making it the sixth deadliest disaster worldwide in the first two decades of the 21st century. Most of the deaths occurred in Italy and France. Several nationwide temperature records were broken during the heatwave, with a peak temperature of 44.1 °C (111.4 °F) recorded in France on August 12.

== Climate change ==
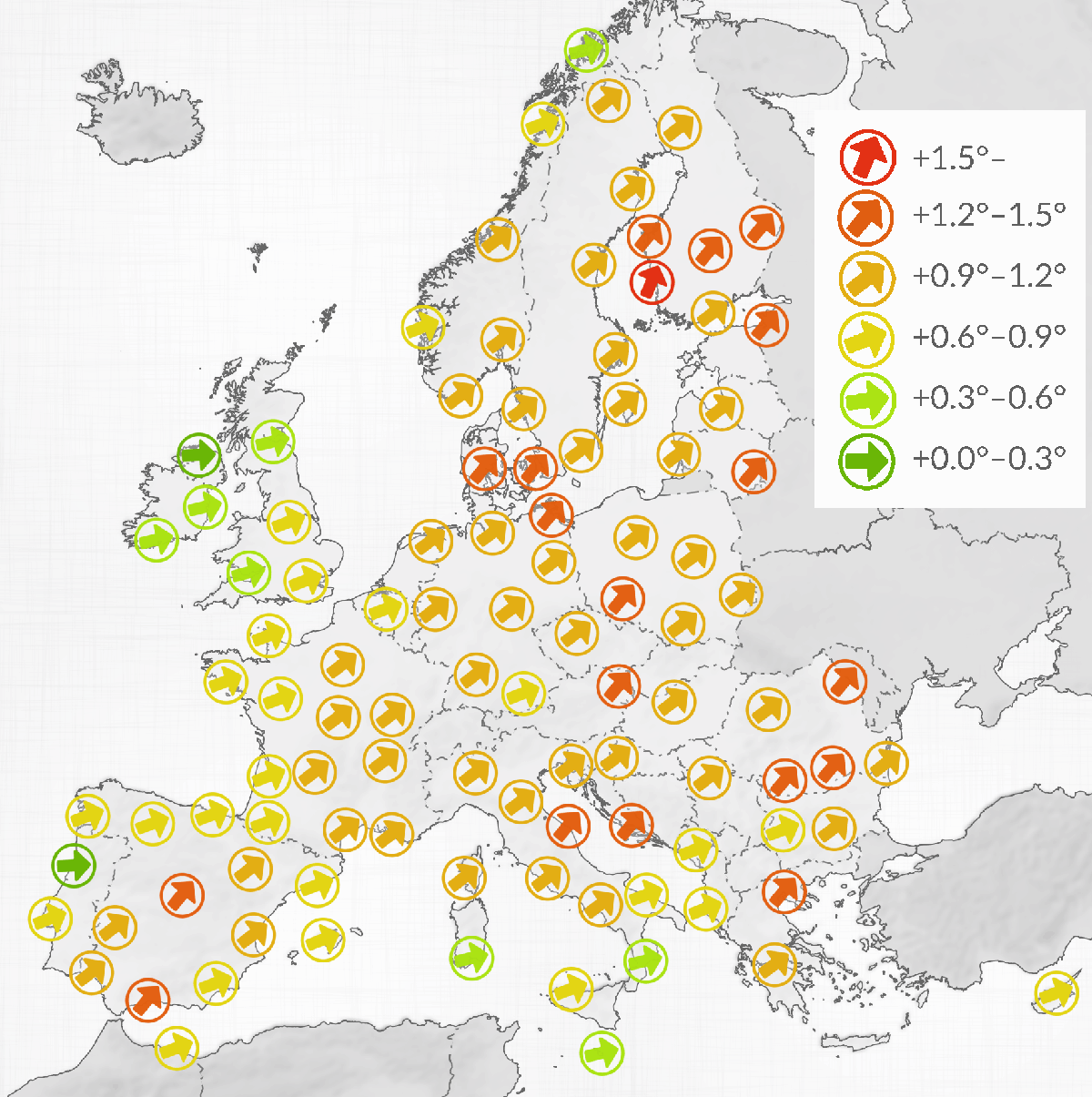
Increase of average yearly temperature (2000–2017) above the 20th century average in selected cities in Europe

Climate change has resulted in an increase in temperature of 2.3 °C (4.14 °F) (2022) in Europe compared to pre-industrial levels. Europe is the fastest-warming continent in the world. Europe's climate is getting warmer due to anthropogenic activity. According to international climate experts, global temperature rise should not exceed 2 °C to prevent the most dangerous consequences of climate change; without reduction in greenhouse gas emissions, this could happen before 2050. Climate change has implications for all regions of Europe, with the extent and nature of effects varying across the continent.

Effects on European countries include warmer weather and increasing frequency and intensity of extreme weather such as heat waves, bringing health risks and effects on ecosystems, for example, the 2026 European drought. European countries are major contributors to global greenhouse gas emissions; however, the European Union and governments of several countries have outlined plans to implement climate change mitigation and an energy transition in the 21st century, the European Green Deal being one of these.

Public opinion in Europe shows concern about climate change; in the European Investment Bank's Climate Survey of 2020, 90% of Europeans believe their children will experience the effects of climate change in their daily lives. Climate change activism and businesses shifting their practices has taken place in Europe.

== Severe weather ==
=== Tornadoes ===
The Netherlands has the highest average number of recorded tornadoes per area of any country in the world (more than 20, or 0.0005 per km^{2}), annually), followed by the UK (around 33, or 0.0001 per km^{2}), per year), but most are small and cause minor damage. In absolute number of events, ignoring area, the UK experiences more tornadoes than any other European country, excluding waterspouts. Europe uses its own tornado scale, known as the TORRO scale, which ranges from a T0 for extremely weak tornadoes to T11 for the most powerful known tornadoes.

=== Tropical cyclones ===
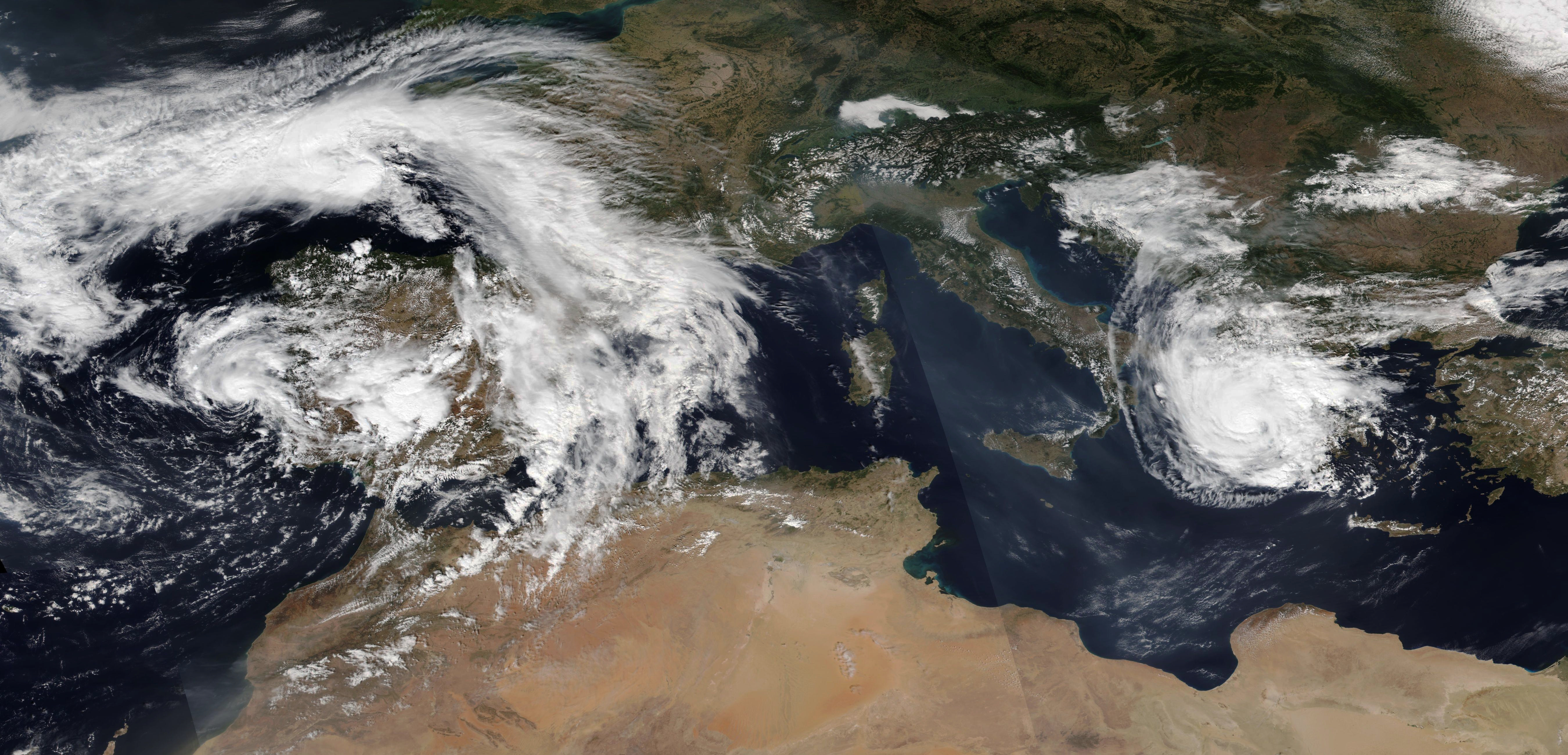
Subtropical Storm Alpha (left) and Cyclone Ianos (right) both affecting Europe in September 2020

Atlantic hurricanes regularly affect Europe after they enter the midlatitudes and transition into an extratropical cyclone. As Post-tropical cyclones, they are typically more intense than other European windstorms that affect the continent. In September 1961, former Hurricane Debbie produced wind gusts of 181 km/h (113 mph) at Malin Head in Ireland, which was the highest-ever wind gust on the island. On two occasions, a tropical or subtropical cyclone made landfall on the European mainland. In October 2005, Tropical Depression Vince hit southern Spain, producing wind gusts as strong as 77 km/h (48 mph) in Rota, Cádiz, while rainfall reached 84 mm (3.3 in) in Córdoba Province. In September 2020, Subtropical Storm Alpha struck Portugal, causing one death, and damage estimated at €20 million (US$24.2 million). Occasionally, tropical-like cyclones in the Mediterranean affect southern Europe. In September 2020 while Alpha was approaching Portugal, Cyclone Ianos struck Greece, producing wind gusts of 195 km/h (121 mph), and damage estimated at €85 million (U$100 million). In September 2023, rains from Storm Daniel caused severe flooding across Greece, killing 17 people and leaving severe damage estimated at €2 billion (US$2.17 billion).

== See also ==
- Arctic oscillation
- North Atlantic oscillation
- Cold drop
- Climate change in Europe
  - 2003 European heat wave
  - 2018 European heat wave
- List of European cities by average temperature
- List of cities in Europe by precipitation
- List of cities in Europe by sunshine duration
- Late December 1999 European storms
