= List of cities in Europe by sunshine duration =

Below is a list of cities located in Europe, excluding countries that are politically or culturally linked to Europe but lie wholly outside its geographic boundaries, along with their monthly and annual sunshine duration.

Sunshine hours for selected cities in Europe
Country	City	Jan	Feb	Mar	Apr	May	Jun	Jul	Aug	Sep	Oct	Nov	Dec	Year	Ref.
Albania	Tirana	124	125	165	191	263	298	354	327	264	218	127	88	2,544	
Albania	Vlorë	133	148	173	225	273	318	369	344	279	211	117	99	2,690	
Albania	Durrës	133	135	173	207	279	318	375	325	261	217	147	124	2,696	
Albania	Lezhë	130	131	173	201	270	306	363	322	258	208	138	118	2,617	
Armenia	Yerevan	104.5	136.8	186.5	206.5	267.1	326.6	353.9	333.7	291.5	217.0	138	91.0	2,675	
Austria	Vienna	70	104	155	217	249	259	273	266	194	133	71	57	2,048	
Austria	Innsbruck	103	126	179	198	209	213	230	221	187	163	102	91	2,048	
Azerbaijan	Baku	79	75	117	195	281	300	312	284	215	145	92	94	2,187	
Belarus	Minsk	34	72	133	185	270	267	271	251	154	103	39	28	1,807	
Belgium	Brussels	59	77	114	159	191	188	201	190	143	113	66	45	1,546	
Bosnia and Herzegovina	Banja Luka	65.1	73.5	133.3	171	226.3	252	282.1	263.5	180	136.4	75	58.9	1,899.3	
Bosnia and Herzegovina	Sarajevo	82.2	101.6	144.8	157.6	193.8	231.4	255.7	239.9	176.6	155.2	94.5	62.1	1,895.4	
Bulgaria	Sofia	88	114	160	182	230	258	302	288	220	164	106	66	2,177	
Bulgaria	Varna	99	119	154	204	259	278	318	318	236	163	105	92	2,345	
Croatia	Zagreb	59	96	140	175	234	244	281	256	187	131	66	45	1,913	
Croatia	Split	133	153	186	210	273	306	347	320	246	192	135	130	2,631	
Czech Republic	Prague	50	72	125	168	214	218	226	212	161	121	54	47	1,668	
Denmark	Aarhus	54	72	148	213	260	251	242	211	161	101	60	49	1,821	
Denmark	Copenhagen	56	83	152	226	271	260	246	231	175	107	60	45	1,912	
Denmark	Rønne	43	76	152	247	311	315	282	252	192	104	53	37	2,063	
Estonia	Tallinn	30	59	148	217	306	294	312	256	162	88	29	20	1,923	
Estonia	Vilsandi	37	69	150	226	316	314	330	271	176	100	38	24	2,066	
Faroe Islands	Tórshavn	14	36	71	106	124	125	111	98	80	49	20	6	840	
Finland	Helsinki	38	70	138	194	284	297	291	238	150	93	36	29	1,858	
France	Lyon	74	101	170	191	221	254	283	253	195	130	76	54	2,002	
France	Marseille	150	156	215	245	293	326	366	327	254	205	156	143	2,836	
France	Nice	156.7	166.1	218.0	229.2	270.9	309.8	349.3	223.2	249.8	191.1	151.5	145.2	2,760.5	
France	Paris	63	79	129	166	194	202	212	212	168	118	68	51	1,662	
Georgia	Tbilisi	99	102	142	171	213	249	256	248	206	164	103	93	2,046	
Germany	Berlin	47	74	121	159	220	222	217	211	156	112	51	37	1,626	
Germany	Frankfurt	50	80	121	178	211	219	233	219	156	103	51	41	1,662	
Germany	Dresden	62.0	82.1	127.0	187.3	222.0	221.3	233.8	222.8	164.2	103	67.9	60.0	1,770.4	
Greece	Athens	130	134	183	231	291	336	363	341	276	208	153	127	2,773	
Greece	Heraklion	119.9	132.3	181.5	234.8	298.5	356.2	368.3	343.5	303.8	275.8	206.9	115.4	2778.6	
Greece	Mytilene	115.4	129.3	185.6	226.2	295.0	355.7	382.9	352.0	289.2	219.8	144.4	95.7	2,791.2	
Greece	Rhodes	145.2	161.0	214.8	244.9	310.7	358.1	368.8	343.6	296.2	244.8	174.7	131.1	2993.9	
Greece	Samos	140.1	148.2	201.1	241.4	310.4	370.7	394.6	373.8	303.8	241.0	170.5	126.4	3022.0	
Greece	Ierapetra	155.6	158.8	208.3	240.2	319.1	355.4	384.7	367.7	307.5	235.9	201.3	167.0	3101.5	
Hungary	Budapest	62	93	137	177	234	250	271	255	187	141	69	52	1,988	
Hungary	Debrecen	57.6	85	146.8	190.3	251.4	266.4	295.3	274.3	201.7	155.1	72.2	47	2,043.1	
Hungary	Miskolc	40.8	69.5	128.3	177.2	224	224.2	254.5	236.4	180.8	141.6	53.2	36	1,766.5	
Iceland	Reykjavík	20	60	109	164	201	174	168	155	120	93	41	22	1,326.2	
Ireland	Dublin	59	75	109	160	195	179	164	157	129	103	71	53	1,453.2	
Italy	Cagliari	150	163	209	218	270	311	342	321	243	209	150	127	2,726	
Italy	Milan	59	96	152	177	211	243	285	251	186	130	66	59	1,915	
Italy	Naples	115	128	158	189	245	279	313	295	234	189	126	105	2,375	
Italy	Rome	121	133	167	201	264	285	332	298	237	195	129	112	2,473	
Latvia	Riga	31	62	127	183	264	288	264	229	153	93	39	22	1,754	
Lithuania	Vilnius	32	57	121	179	252	246	260	237	154	95	35	23	1,691	
Luxembourg	Luxembourg	43	82	118	165	208	210	232.5	208	159	108.5	57	43	1,634	
Malta	Valletta	169	178	227	254	310	337	377	352	270	224	195	161	3,054	
Moldova	Chișinău	75	80	125	187	254	283	299	295	226	169	75	58	2,126	
Monaco	Monaco	149.8	158.9	185.5	210	248.1	281.1	329.3	296.7	224.7	199	155.2	136.5	2,575	
Montenegro	Podgorica	123	126	170	194	251	276	340	314	252	201	126	109	2,481	
Netherlands	Amsterdam	69	94	146	197	230	217	225	203	154	116	66	58	1,779	
Netherlands	Eindhoven	69.0	87.9	139.8	186.4	214.4	209.0	213.2	199.1	161.0	122.4	73.4	56.5	1732.1	
North Macedonia	Skopje	87	113	161	198	245	276	323	305	248	188	115	80	2,339	
Norway	Bergen	32	69	109	215	254	239	230	196	116	88	43	22	1,613	
Norway	Oslo	40	76	126	178	220	250	246	216	144	86	51	35	1,668	
Norway	Tromsø	3	32	112	160	218	221	205	167	92	49	6	0	1,265	
Poland	Warsaw	44.6	66.5	139.4	210.1	272.4	288.8	295.4	280.2	193.1	122.6	50.6	33.6	1,997.1	
Portugal	Faro	182.1	172.0	242.6	253.6	305.0	326.9	360.6	344.9	279.1	227.0	191.6	159.0	3,044.4	
Portugal	Lisbon	143	157	208	234	291	303	353	344	261	214	156	143	2,806	
Portugal	Portimão	158.7	168.7	202.4	264.7	319.9	337.1	382.8	356.3	265.2	219.8	174.9	168.3	3,018.8	
Portugal	Porto	124	129	192	217	258	274	308	295	224	184	139	124	2,468	
Portugal	Tavira	170.8	193.4	206.0	277.4	334.6	358.1	395.3	370.4	290.5	243.0	172.5	164.9	3,176.9	
Romania	Bucharest	71	85	140	186	245	267	288	282	225	177	87	62	2,115	
Russia	Moscow	37	65	142	213	274	299	323	242	171	88	33	14	1,901	
Russia	Saint Petersburg	18.9	45.5	120.5	177.9	255.6	254.3	267.7	228.1	134.8	61.8	23.0	8.1	1,596.2	
Russia	Vladikavkaz	106	119	133	159	194	205	220	208	167	148	114	103	1,876	
Russia	Arkhangelsk	14.2	50.6	129.3	189.1	252.8	291.0	298.0	200.9	111.3	50.3	14.9	1.8	1,604.2	
Russia	Sochi	96	107	146	162	220	258	279	282	225	195	120	87	2,178	
Serbia	Belgrade	72	102	153	188	242	261	291	274	204	163	97	65	2,112	
Serbia	Niš	65	93	148	171	221	251	287	274	202	151	86	49	1,998	
Slovakia	Bratislava	65.5	99.3	153.7	218.6	258.1	269.4	286.5	273.3	194.5	134.6	69.5	51.9	2,074.9	
Slovenia	Ljubljana	71	114	149	178	235	246	293	264	183	120	66	56	1,974	
Spain	Alicante	181	180	227	247	277	302	330	304	250	217	173	164	2,851	
Spain	Almería	194	191	232	261	297	325	342	315	256	218	183	178	2,994	
Spain	Badajoz	146	163	226	244	292	335	376	342	260	206	155	114	2,860	
Spain	Barcelona	158	171	206	239	258	287	293	264	229	196	153	137	2,591	
Spain	Cáceres	156	175	232	247	297	336	379	348	261	205	158	129	2,922	
Spain	Cádiz	184	197	228	255	307	331	354	335	252	228	187	166	3,024	
Spain	Córdoba	174	186	218	235	289	323	363	336	248	205	180	148	2,905	
Spain	Huelva	165	171	229	255	296	341	367	340	268	211	176	151	2,970	
Spain	Málaga	171	179	212	238	289	327	343	310	248	209	166	152	2,842	
Spain	Madrid	148	157	214	231	272	310	359	335	261	198	157	124	2,769	
Spain	Murcia	189	190	223	256	289	323	353	317	239	217	186	172	2,967	
Spain	Seville	202.0	212.2	246.3	270.2	324.9	357.3	388.1	364.3	278.4	244.4	205.3	185.9	3,279.3	
Spain	Valencia	171	171	215	234	259	276	315	288	235	202	167	155	2,696	
Sweden	Gothenburg	44	69	167	211	239	256	234	196	168	99	47	32	1,762	
Sweden	Stockholm	40	72	139	185	254	292	260	221	154	99	54	33	1,803	
Switzerland	Zurich	48	77	125	159	186	204	230	208	151	93	50	35	1,566	
Switzerland	Geneva	61	96	161	187	212	246	269	242	184	116	65	48	1,887	
Switzerland	Sion	93	131	188	210	229	254	271	250	208	160	96	68	2,158	
Switzerland	Lugano	124	142	192	182	200	229	260	245	192	141	105	107	2,120	
Turkey	Istanbul	71	88	133	180	251	300	322	295	243	164	102	68	2,218	
Ukraine	Kyiv	31	57	124	180	279	270	310	248	210	155	60	31	1,955	
United Kingdom	Belfast	40.1	65.2	97.7	157.1	185.1	151.1	146.3	141.9	112.0	92.4	52.9	35.3	1,277.0	
United Kingdom	Cardiff	53.5	76.2	116.6	177	198.4	195.2	199.6	185.3	151.9	103.9	65	50.4	1,573	
United Kingdom	Edinburgh	53.5	78.5	114.8	144.6	188.4	165.9	172.2	161.5	128.8	101.2	71	46.2	1,426.6	
United Kingdom	Inverness	40.4	74.3	110.1	143.9	183.6	142.8	139.2	135.8	117.2	82.4	52.2	27.7	1,249.6	
United Kingdom	Kingston upon Hull	55.5	79	117.7	159.1	200.2	189.4	197.1	183.2	147.4	109.2	65.7	55.3	1,558.8	
United Kingdom	London	61.1	78.9	124.5	176.7	207.5	208.4	217.8	202.1	157.1	115.2	70.7	55.0	1,674.8	
United Kingdom	Manchester	32	50	99	153	175	153	171	154	116	79	42	43	1,265	
United Kingdom	Southampton	63.4	82.7	125.1	181.6	215.5	211.7	223.8	205.8	152	112.7	76.3	55.3	1,705.9	

== See also ==
- List of cities by sunshine duration
