= List of cities by sunshine duration =

The following is a list of cities by sunshine duration. Sunshine duration is a climatological indicator, measuring duration of sunshine in given period (usually, a day or a year) for a given location on Earth, typically expressed as an averaged value over several years. It is a general indicator of cloudiness of a location, and thus differs from insolation, which measures the total energy delivered by sunlight over a given period.

Sunshine duration is usually expressed in hours per year, or in (average) hours per day. The first measure indicates the general sunniness of a location compared with other places, while the latter allows for comparison of sunshine in various seasons in the same location. Another often-used measure is percentage ratio of recorded bright sunshine duration and daylight duration in the observed period.

== Africa ==
Sunshine hours for selected cities in Africa
Country	City	Jan	Feb	Mar	Apr	May	Jun	Jul	Aug	Sep	Oct	Nov	Dec	Year	Ref.
Ivory Coast	Gagnoa	180.0	196.0	188.0	181.0	118.0	97.0	80.0	110.0	183.0	155.0	171.0	164.0	1,823.0	
Ivory Coast	Bouaké	242.0	224.0	219.0	194.0	208.0	145.0	104.0	82.0	115.0	170.0	191.0	198.0	2,092.0	
Ivory Coast	Abidjan	223.0	223.0	239.0	214.0	205.0	128.0	137.0	125.0	139.0	215.0	224.0	224.0	2,296.0	
Ivory Coast	Odienné	242.0	220.2	217.3	214.7	248.8	221.8	183.5	174.5	185.4	235.8	252.0	242.6	2,638.6	
Ivory Coast	Ferké	279.0	249.0	253.0	229.0	251.0	221.0	183.0	151.0	173.0	245.0	261.0	262.0	2,757.0	
Benin	Cotonou	213.9	210.0	223.2	219.0	213.9	141.0	136.4	148.8	165.0	207.7	243.0	223.2	2,345.2	
Benin	Parakou	261.0	243.0	252.0	230.0	239.0	193.0	133.0	104.0	129.0	217.0	252.0	248.0	2,501.0	
Benin	Kandi	279.0	257.6	260.4	255.0	272.8	252.0	223.2	195.3	213.0	275.9	282.0	279.0	3,045.2	
Togo	Lomé	217.5	214.0	227.9	201.9	208.6	146.0	141.6	148.8	152.5	205.5	234.0	235.6	2,333.9	
Togo	Mango	285.0	254.0	270.0	241.0	261.0	219.0	168.0	131.0	161.0	273.0	284.0	279.0	2,826.0	
Ghana	Accra	217.0	226.0	217.0	210.0	217.0	150.0	155.0	155.0	180.0	217.0	240.0	248.0	2,432.0	
Ghana	Tamale	265.6	235.7	249.6	229.0	248.0	212.0	171.5	139.0	161.0	260.9	283.0	263.5	2,718.7	
Ghana	Kumasi	186.6	187.2	205.4	204.0	204.7	146.3	101.2	77.0	106.2	161.4	193.8	178.0	1,951.8	
Cameroon	Garoua	275.0	252.6	260.1	245.4	256.7	224.4	194.0	187.2	204.5	261.5	279.2	286.5	2,927.1	
Cameroon	N'Gaoundéré	286.4	258.7	235.4	195.5	195.4	165.7	128.0	127.8	139.0	184.0	264.1	291.4	2,471.4	
Cameroon	Douala	184.0	179.0	170.0	174.0	169.0	107.0	55.0	46.0	79.0	120.0	160.0	175.0	1,618.0	
Cameroon	Yaoundé	177.0	172.0	149.0	153.0	158.0	112.0	85.0	83.0	97.0	120.0	159.0	179.0	1,644.0	
Gabon	Libreville	175.2	176.8	176.9	176.8	159.5	130.6	119.2	90.4	95.9	112.9	134.6	167.8	1,716.6	
Gabon	Port-Gentil	150.4	160.8	154.5	151.5	147.8	156.3	163.1	135.3	125.7	116.1	115.1	147.2	1,723.8	
Nigeria	Lagos	164.3	169.5	173.6	180.0	176.7	114.0	99.2	108.5	114.0	167.4	186.0	192.2	1,845.4	
Nigeria	Makurdi	236.0	226.0	223.0	216.0	223.0	177.0	143.0	118.0	144.0	198.0	228.0	248.0	2,380.0	
Nigeria	Jos	307.0	274.0	260.0	220.0	208.0	201.0	151.0	127.0	171.0	242.0	294.0	313.0	2,768.0	
Nigeria	Kano	275.0	255.0	267.0	252.0	273.0	261.0	233.0	186.0	237.0	295.0	297.0	285.0	3,114.0	
Nigeria	Sokoto	279.0	269.0	282.0	255.0	279.0	282.0	229.0	208.0	243.0	307.0	297.0	288.0	3,238.0	
Sudan	Port Sudan	214.0	230.0	282.0	312.0	338.0	309.0	307.0	298.0	300.0	307.0	249.0	236.0	3,382.0	
Sudan	Khartoum	341.0	311.0	310.0	330.0	300.0	300.0	279.0	279.0	300.0	310.0	330.0	341.0	3,737.1	
Eritrea	Asmara	304.7	289.1	300.7	300.5	298.5	271.5	217.9	220.1	260.4	301.0	292.5	299.1	3,361.0	
Burkina Faso	Ouagadougou	287.0	263.0	264.0	256.0	277.0	264.0	240.0	223.0	217.0	273.0	288.0	284.0	3,136.0	
Burkina Faso	Ouahigouya	291.0	267.0	280.0	268.0	284.0	272.0	258.0	253.0	261.0	280.0	288.0	280.0	3,282.0	
Niger	Niamey	297.6	263.2	269.7	252.0	279.0	267.0	257.3	235.6	235.6	282.6	282.0	279.0	3,203.2	
Chad	N'Djamena	297.6	277.2	282.1	273.0	285.2	258.0	213.9	201.5	228.0	285.2	300.0	303.8	3,205.5	
Chad	Abéché	316.2	291.2	300.7	300.0	313.1	300.0	254.2	226.3	261.0	306.9	312.0	319.3	3,500.9	
Gambia	Banjul	279.0	282.0	310.0	300.0	310.0	270.0	186.0	186.0	180.0	248.0	240.0	279.0	3,070.0	
Senegal	Dakar	253.0	249.0	303.0	301.0	299.0	259.0	233.0	204.0	219.0	254.0	256.0	249.0	3,078.0	
Senegal	Thiès	267.0	260.0	325.0	332.0	324.0	276.0	226.0	188.0	221.0	267.0	271.0	257.0	3,214.0	
Somalia	Mogadishu	268.0	251.0	282.0	260.0	273.0	218.0	226.0	253.0	265.0	267.0	261.0	259.0	3,082.0	
Somalia	Buloburde	290.0	283.0	293.0	249.0	287.0	261.0	216.0	238.0	262.0	230.0	246.0	268.0	3,124.0	
Djibouti	Djibouti City	254.0	249.0	279.0	279.0	310.0	237.0	236.0	276.0	282.0	310.0	291.0	276.0	3,279.0	
Mali	Ségou	292.0	276.0	292.0	263.0	274.0	266.0	254.0	223.0	242.0	283.0	287.0	287.0	3,239.0	
Mali	Timbuktu	263.9	249.6	269.9	254.6	275.3	234.7	248.6	255.3	248.9	273.0	274.0	258.7	3,106.5	
Mali	Bamako	277.4	253.0	268.1	230.4	242.6	233.6	216.6	218.3	221.7	253.7	270.7	268.9	2,954.1	
Algeria	Algiers	149.0	165.0	202.0	258.0	319.0	318.0	350.0	319.0	237.0	229.0	165.0	136.0	2,847.0	
Algeria	Tamanrasset	297.6	275.5	322.4	327.0	328.6	306.0	356.5	331.7	288.0	310.0	285.0	272.8	3,686.0	
Tunisia	Tunis	145.7	165.3	198.4	225.0	282.1	309.0	356.5	328.6	258.0	217.0	174.0	148.8	2,808.4	
Tunisia	Gabes	220.1	215.6	251.1	267.0	313.1	321.0	372.0	353.4	279.0	260.4	228.0	210.8	3,291.5	
Morocco	Rabat	179.8	183.6	232.5	255.0	291.4	288.0	316.2	306.9	261.0	235.6	189.0	179.8	2,918.8	
Morocco	Marrakesh	220.1	211.8	248.0	255.0	288.3	315.0	334.8	316.2	264.0	244.9	213.0	220.1	3,131.2	
Morocco	Ouarzazate	251.8	244.9	297.2	315.2	332.7	335.0	317.7	293.2	266.4	271.3	242.9	248.1	3,416.4	
Egypt	Alexandria	217.0	226.2	279.0	318.0	337.9	357.0	372.0	368.9	333.0	306.9	246.0	207.7	3,579.5	
Egypt	Cairo	229.4	234.9	279.0	306.0	331.7	363.0	372.0	356.5	318.0	294.5	246.0	210.8	3,541.8	
Egypt	Marsa Alam	279.0	283.0	310.0	330.0	372.0	390.0	403.0	372.0	330.0	310.0	300.0	279.0	3,958.0	
Libya	Tripoli	206.0	214.0	237.0	250.0	315.0	312.0	376.0	352.0	271.0	244.0	212.0	198.0	3,187.0	
Libya	Benghazi	179.8	192.0	232.5	252.0	319.3	327.0	381.3	365.8	288.0	251.1	213.0	167.4	3,169.2	
Kenya	Mombasa	269.7	257.1	269.7	225.0	204.6	207.0	210.8	244.9	246.0	272.8	264.0	260.4	2,932.0	
Kenya	Nairobi	288.3	266.0	267.0	204.0	189.1	159.0	130.2	127.1	180.0	226.3	198.0	257.3	2,492.3	
Kenya	Garissa	251.1	235.2	263.5	273.0	282.1	255.0	254.2	257.3	270.0	279.0	252.0	241.8	3,114.2	
Kenya	Lodwar	319.0	280.0	282.0	279.0	307.0	297.0	279.0	310.0	321.0	316.0	282.0	310.0	3,582.0	
Angola	Luanda	219.0	208.0	213.0	199.0	233.0	223.0	175.0	150.0	145.0	164.0	199.0	212.0	2,341.0	
South Sudan	Juba	288.3	237.8	220.1	195.0	241.8	225.0	182.9	213.9	225.0	235.6	237.0	251.1	2,753.5	
South Sudan	Wau	300.7	269.7	260.4	228.0	254.2	237.0	176.7	192.2	210.0	229.4	267.0	303.8	2,929.1	
Tanzania	Dar-es-Salaam	251.0	241.0	217.0	156.0	192.0	231.0	251.0	242.0	243.0	254.0	270.0	287.0	2,815.0	
Tanzania	Zanzibar	251.0	243.0	213.0	180.0	210.0	220.0	235.0	253.0	254.0	270.0	250.0	259.0	2,838.0	
Tanzania	Tabora	216.0	218.0	219.0	227.0	283.0	303.0	310.0	297.0	312.0	301.0	240.0	217.0	3,143.0	
Tanzania	Dodoma	241.8	217.5	241.8	240.0	279.0	294.0	341.0	297.6	300.0	310.0	303.0	269.7	3,335.4	
Ethiopia	Mekelle	294.2	276.7	279.9	277.2	303.2	230.1	165.5	166.5	248.7	291.1	292.8	303.5	3,129.4	
Ethiopia	Addis Abeba	269.7	246.5	248.0	213.0	217.0	156.0	111.6	133.3	138.0	266.6	267.0	266.6	2,440.3	
Congo	Brazzaville	168.0	152.0	194.0	185.0	188.0	153.0	127.0	149.0	145.0	150.0	157.0	147.0	1,915.0	
Republic of the Congo	Pointe-Noire	157.0	156.0	164.0	160.0	150.0	132.0	119.0	106.0	70.0	93.0	123.0	144.0	1,574.0	
Republic of the Congo	Dolisie	153.0	164.0	159.0	152.0	151.0	136.0	119.0	105.0	91.0	116.0	128.0	133.0	1,607.0	
Democratic Republic of the Congo	Kinshasa	124.0	140.0	155.0	150.0	155.0	120.0	124.0	155.0	120.0	155.0	150.0	124.0	1,672.0	
Democratic Republic of the Congo	Lubumbashi	129.0	120.0	174.0	234.0	291.0	295.0	315.0	318.0	294.0	282.0	194.0	132.0	2,778.0	
Mauritania	Nouadhibou	271.0	248.0	300.0	295.0	315.0	303.0	275.0	281.0	261.0	260.0	257.0	264.0	3,332.0	
Mauritania	Nouakchott	267.0	250.0	302.0	311.0	320.0	284.0	271.0	265.0	266.0	263.0	268.0	267.0	3,333.0	
South Africa	Pretoria	261.0	235.0	254.0	246.6	283.0	271.0	289.0	296.0	284.0	275.0	254.0	272.0	3,220.0	
South Africa	Cape Town	337.9	297.4	292.9	233.5	205.3	175.4	193.1	212.1	224.7	277.7	309.8	334.2	3,094.0	
South Africa	Johannesburg	250.1	224.8	238.8	236.9	276.0	266.9	283.9	284.1	280.8	269.5	248.7	263.9	3,124.4	
South Africa	Bloemfontein	296.3	247.9	258.6	250.2	266.0	249.9	272.6	285.9	278.0	290.9	296.5	319.5	3,312.3	
South Africa	Upington	352.9	298.7	297.5	283.5	290.5	270.3	289.8	307.3	300.2	328.9	345.2	367.0	3,731.8	
South Africa	Durban	184.0	178.8	201.6	206.4	223.6	224.9	230.4	217.0	173.3	169.4	166.1	189.9	2,365.4	
Botswana	Maun	245.0	207.0	257.0	282.0	310.0	300.0	313.0	332.0	315.0	291.0	264.0	214.0	3,330.0	
Botswana	Gaborone	280.6	261.5	264.4	260.5	284.2	260.0	292.4	313.6	308.4	295.4	265.5	285.2	3,371.0	
Botswana	Ghanzi	295.0	280.0	313.0	282.0	316.0	306.0	316.0	319.0	305.0	279.0	300.0	267.0	3,579.0	
Zambia	Ndola	151.9	142.8	192.2	243.0	279.0	276.0	297.6	297.6	279.0	269.7	207.0	158.1	2,793.9	
Zambia	Lusaka	176.7	168.0	220.1	246.0	275.9	270.0	294.5	303.8	291.0	272.8	234.0	182.9	2,935.7	
Zambia	Livingstone	213.9	196.0	251.1	273.0	303.8	288.0	310.0	319.3	297.0	279.0	228.0	207.7	3,166.8	
Zimbabwe	Harare	217.0	190.4	232.5	249.0	269.7	264.0	279.0	300.7	294.0	285.2	231.0	198.4	3,010.9	
Zimbabwe	Bulawayo	244.9	212.8	251.1	252.0	279.0	267.0	288.3	300.7	288.0	272.8	237.0	226.3	3,119.9	
Malawi	Karonga	176.7	170.8	207.7	222.0	254.2	264.0	285.2	306.9	306.0	319.3	273.0	213.9	2,999.7	
Malawi	Blantyre	198.4	182.0	217.0	237.0	260.4	237.0	232.3	260.4	270.0	275.9	228.0	198.4	2,797.0	
Malawi	Mzuzu	145.7	142.1	164.3	171.0	217.0	219.0	238.5	275.9	288.0	300.7	252.0	176.7	2,590.9	
Madagascar	Fianarantsoa	191.1	171.0	175.4	184.8	186.0	165.9	163.5	191.1	220.5	230.4	208.0	190.1	2,277.8	
Madagascar	Toamasina	224.7	198.2	191.0	196.9	192.1	162.5	162.8	184.6	209.7	232.7	236.0	219.2	2,410.4	
Madagascar	Antananarivo	210.5	178.0	199.1	220.5	228.8	206.1	213.9	235.0	249.5	251.0	232.7	201.1	2,626.2	
Madagascar	Antsiranana	189.2	170.0	214.9	256.4	284.8	256.5	273.1	283.6	293.3	306.8	281.5	228.9	3,039.0	
Madagascar	Mahajanga	209.0	184.9	244.8	269.9	294.9	282.9	291.5	303.1	307.0	319.7	288.2	227.3	3,223.2	
Madagascar	Toliara	305.0	285.0	296.0	302.0	306.0	277.0	291.0	298.0	307.0	324.0	313.0	306.0	3,610.0	
Mozambique	Maputo	248.0	226.0	248.0	240.0	248.0	240.0	248.0	248.0	248.0	217.0	210.0	217.0	2,838.0	
Central African Republic	Bangui	217.0	196.0	186.0	180.0	186.0	180.0	124.0	124.0	150.0	155.0	180.0	217.0	2,095.0	
Central African Republic	Birao	289.6	275.0	270.6	248.1	255.7	216.9	190.7	186.5	210.0	267.2	290.3	297.4	2,998.0	
Uganda	Kampala	238.0	193.0	189.0	195.0	187.0	189.0	139.0	168.0	157.0	172.0	178.0	205.0	2,210.0	
Uganda	Entebbe	233.0	204.0	205.0	180.0	192.0	186.0	198.0	195.0	195.0	201.0	198.0	211.0	2,398.0	
Burundi	Bujumbura	167.4	158.2	176.7	165.0	210.8	255.0	272.8	251.1	213.0	189.1	150.0	164.3	2,373.4	
Guinea	Conakry	223.0	224.0	251.0	222.0	208.0	153.0	109.0	87.0	135.0	189.0	207.0	214.0	2,222.0	
Guinea	Kankan	262.0	236.0	249.0	220.0	234.0	216.0	169.0	159.0	191.0	221.0	241.0	260.0	2,658.0	
Guinea-Bissau	Bissau	248.0	226.0	279.0	270.0	248.0	210.0	186.0	155.0	180.0	217.0	240.0	248.0	2,707.0	
Equatorial Guinea	Bata	201.5	192.1	173.6	177.0	189.1	147.0	142.6	142.6	114.0	114.7	141.0	186.0	1,921.2	
Equatorial Guinea	Malabo	148.8	152.5	108.5	120.0	117.8	69.0	46.5	58.9	48.0	68.2	99.0	139.5	1,176.7	

== Asia ==
Sunshine hours for selected cities in Asia
Country	City	Jan	Feb	Mar	Apr	May	Jun	Jul	Aug	Sep	Oct	Nov	Dec	Year	Ref.
Afghanistan	Kabul	177.2	178.6	204.5	232.5	310.3	353.4	356.8	339.7	303.9	282.6	253.2	182.4	3,175.1	
Afghanistan	Fayzabad	117.3	116.7	149.2	186.2	256.9	313.6	324.5	305.2	279.1	224.2	176.4	127.3	2,576.6	
Afghanistan	Kandahar	199.9	180.6	234.6	254.7	346.1	369.7	342.2	338.5	322.9	306.7	263.8	216.1	3,375.8	
Afghanistan	Kunduz	114.4	114.6	158.9	201.0	276.5	332.1	340.2	315.5	289.7	221.8	169.3	118.3	2,652.3	
Lebanon	Beirut	131	143	191	243	310	348	360	334	288	245	200	147	2,940	
Bangladesh	Dhaka	220.3	225.3	256.3	237.8	220.9	142.2	131.5	140.6	152.7	228.6	236.3	242.6	2,435.1	
China	Beijing	194.1	194.7	231.8	251.9	283.4	261.4	212.4	220.9	232.1	222.1	185.3	180.7	2,670.8	
China	Chengdu	53.3	51.4	83.1	113.9	121.7	117.2	131.9	155.0	77.6	59.4	57.2	51.6	1,073.3	
China	Chongqing	16.6	32.9	72.8	105.8	109.7	98.7	169.3	175.2	102.6	46.6	35.0	18.0	983.2	
China	Fuzhou	101.6	79.2	89.1	111.0	114.4	141.9	225.6	199.2	153.7	144.2	120.3	126.9	1,607.1	
China	Guangzhou	118.5	71.6	62.4	65.1	104.0	140.2	202.0	173.5	170.2	181.8	172.7	166.0	1,628.0	
China	Hong Kong	143.0	94.2	90.8	101.7	140.4	146.1	212.0	188.9	172.3	193.9	180.1	172.2	1,835.6	
China	Lhasa	250.9	226.7	246.1	248.9	276.6	257.3	227.4	219.6	229.0	281.7	267.4	258.6	2,990.2	
China	Macau	127.4	79.4	71.5	85.3	136.4	155.3	223.2	195.4	176.5	192.3	172.2	159.1	1,773.9	
China	Nanjing	124.7	120.3	144.7	169.2	194.2	162.8	196.7	201.6	164.0	164.2	147.4	137.1	1,926.9	
China	Ningbo	123.7	108.4	121.7	142.4	156.7	147.8	243.8	238.0	171.5	166.5	143.4	146.1	1,910.0	
China	Qingdao	186.0	180.8	220.1	222.0	244.9	219.0	182.9	223.2	219.0	220.1	189.0	182.9	2,489.9	
China	Shanghai	114.3	119.9	128.5	148.5	169.8	130.9	190.8	185.7	167.5	161.4	131.1	127.4	1,775.8	
China	Tianjin	170.1	170.2	202.4	223.8	249.0	226.9	206.4	204.4	205.3	196.1	163.0	157.6	2,375.2	
China	Ürümqi	101.6	128.8	180.5	248.0	283.3	282.7	298.7	301.0	262.6	224.4	127.4	84.3	2,523.3	
China	Wuhan	101.9	97.0	121.8	152.8	181.0	170.9	220.2	226.4	175.8	151.9	139.3	126.5	1,775.8	
China	Xiamen	133.3	88.3	89.6	105.6	132.6	163.8	234.6	211.6	178.9	188.4	163.0	163.5	1,853.2	
India	Delhi	214.6	216.1	239.1	261.0	263.1	196.5	165.9	177.0	219.0	269.3	247.2	215.8	2,684.6	
India	Kolkata	203.9	201.2	225.8	235.4	227.1	123.1	93.1	104.9	116.2	182.6	190.8	203.4	2,107.5	
India	Mumbai	269.5	257.6	274.3	283.7	296.2	148.6	73.4	75.9	165.1	240.2	245.8	253.2	2,583.5	
India	Bangalore	262.0	248.0	271.0	257.0	241.0	137.0	112.0	114.0	144.0	173.0	190.0	212.0	2,361.0	
India	Chennai	232.5	240.1	291.4	294.0	300.7	234.0	142.6	189.1	195.0	257.3	261.0	210.8	2,848.5	
Indonesia	Denpasar	173.1	174.0	210.7	224.7	242.9	228.1	246.8	261.7	251.3	252.5	224.4	176.4	2,666.6	
Indonesia	Jakarta	189.1	180.8	238.7	255.0	260.4	255.0	282.1	294.5	300.7	279.0	231.0	217.0	2,983.3	
Indonesia	Makassar	155	168	186	240	248	241	270	298	300	305	280	158	2,849	
Indonesia	Medan	129.6	141.0	153.1	131.2	134.8	157.9	153.9	143.9	123.1	116.3	104.8	98.1	1,587.7	
Iran	Bandar Abbas	222.8	210.8	227.0	254.9	312.9	303.5	270.2	271.6	265.9	281.9	251.4	227.6	3,242.3	
Iran	Gorgan	147	132	145	166	226	248	243	256	217	206	159	142	2,287	
Iran	Isfahan	204.6	216.6	246.4	250.9	308.3	348.8	349.3	341.1	312.5	281.3	223.7	196.3	3279.8	
Iran	Mashhad	148.3	147.5	163.3	200.4	280.4	343.2	366.9	359.7	305.2	249.5	188.3	151.6	2,904.3	
Iran	Rasht	91.7	86.7	91.2	122.0	174.0	213.2	222.1	187.7	140.2	118.3	100.2	89.6	1636.9	
Iran	Tabriz	123.5	146.1	179.5	201.3	269.5	336.7	353.6	339.5	303.3	231.8	177.3	132.	2794.3	
Iran	Tehran	137.2	151.1	186.0	219.1	279.8	328.7	336.6	336.8	300.5	246.8	169.4	134.1	2,826.1	
Iran	Qom	185.0	194.0	221.5	233.3	296.6	351.5	354.5	347.3	309.9	263.4	204.9	172.7	3,134.6	
Iraq	Baghdad	192.2	203.3	244.9	255.0	300.7	348.0	347.2	353.4	315.0	272.8	213.0	195.3	3,240.8	
Israel	Tel Aviv	192.2	200.1	235.6	270.0	328.6	357.0	368.9	356.5	300.0	279.0	234.0	189.1	3,311.0	
Japan	Sapporo	92.5	104.0	146.6	176.5	198.4	187.8	164.9	171.0	160.5	152.3	100.0	85.9	1,740.4	
Japan	Sendai	149.0	154.7	178.6	193.7	191.9	143.7	126.3	144.5	128.0	147.0	143.4	136.3	1,836.9	
Japan	Tokyo	184.5	165.8	163.1	176.9	167.8	125.4	146.4	169.0	120.9	131.0	147.9	178.0	1,876.7	
Japan	Kanazawa	62.3	86.5	144.8	184.8	207.2	162.5	167.2	215.9	153.6	152.0	108.6	68.9	1,714.1	
Japan	Nagoya	174.5	175.5	199.7	200.2	205.5	151.8	166.0	201.3	159.6	168.9	167.1	170.3	2,141	
Jordan	Amman	179.8	182.0	226.3	266.6	328.6	369.0	387.5	365.8	312.0	275.9	225.0	179.8	3,289.7	
Kazakhstan	Almaty	118	119	147	194	241	280	306	294	245	184	127	101	2,356	
Kazakhstan	Astana	103	147	192	238	301	336	336	294	230	136	100	94	2,507	
Mongolia	Ulaanbaatar	179.1	204.8	265.2	262.5	299.3	269.0	249.3	258.3	245.7	227.5	177.4	156.4	2,791.5	
North Korea	Pyongyang	184	197	231	237	263	229	181	204	222	214	165	165	2,492	
Oman	Muscat	268.6	244.8	278.3	292.5	347.4	325.7	277.7	278.6	303.9	316.9	291.9	267.0	3,493.3	
Oman	Masirah	287.2	259.1	297.3	311.2	346.6	268.6	238.1	248	283.6	317.9	299.5	288.9	3,446.0	
Oman	Salalah	289.6	256.8	297.6	308.3	335.1	199.5	43.9	42.4	188	314.7	304.7	296.8	2,877.4	
Pakistan	Islamabad	195.7	187.1	202.3	252.4	319.0	300.1	264.4	250.7	262.2	275.5	247.9	195.6	2952.9	
Pakistan	Karachi	270.7	249.4	271.6	277.4	299.1	231.8	155.0	147.7	218.8	283.5	273.3	272.0	2,950.3	
Pakistan	Lahore	218.8	215.0	245.8	276.6	308.3	269.0	227.5	234.9	265.6	290.0	259.6	222.9	3,034.0	
Pakistan	Quetta	229.1	209.95	232.5	273.0	334.8	327.0	313.1	313.1	294.0	306.9	279.0	238.7	3,341.25	
Philippines	Manila	176.7	197.8	225.8	258.0	222.7	162.0	132.8	132.8	132.0	157.6	153.0	151.9	2,103.1	
Russia	Dikson	0.0	22.6	127.1	237.0	189.1	141.0	223.2	139.5	60.0	24.8	0.0	0.0	1,164.3	
Russia	Irkutsk	93	149	207	223	266	264	243	218	182	152	93	62	2,142	
Russia	Omsk	68	125	184	235	284	319	321	248	180	105	71	61	2,201	
Russia	Petropavlovsk- Kamchatsky	105.4	115.8	176.7	192.0	192.2	192.0	170.5	176.7	177.0	158.1	123.0	93.0	1,872.4	
Russia	Vladivostok	178	184	216	192	199	130	122	149	197	205	168	156	2,096	
Russia	Yakutsk	18.6	98.0	232.5	273.0	303.8	333.0	347.2	272.8	174.0	105.4	60.0	9.3	2,227.6	
Saudi Arabia	Abha	266.6	265.6	294.5	282.0	288.3	276.0	232.5	238.7	273.0	291.4	273.0	266.6	3,248.2	
Saudi Arabia	Riyadh	212.4	226.6	219.8	242.3	287.7	328.2	332.1	309.2	271.6	311.4	269.2	214.3	3,224.8	
Singapore	Singapore	172.4	183.2	192.7	173.6	179.8	177.7	187.9	180.6	156.2	155.2	129.6	133.5	2,022.4	
South Korea	Busan	199.0	182.5	193.0	210.0	221.7	179.7	165.8	200.9	167.2	208.9	194.4	204.3	2,327.3	
South Korea	Seoul	160.3	163.3	189.0	205.0	213.0	182.0	120.0	152.5	176.2	198.8	153.2	152.6	2,066.0	
Sri Lanka	Colombo	248.0	246.4	275.9	234.0	201.5	195.0	201.5	201.5	189.0	201.5	210.0	217.0	2,621.3	
Taiwan	Tainan	179	158	178	172	186	181	210	189	179	196	172	195	2,195	
Taiwan	Taipei	76.1	79.3	95.1	96.9	113.6	114.8	176.9	182.8	151.7	114.7	93.3	78.6	1,373.8	
Taiwan	Taoyuan	76	78	96	97	113	121	179	188	153	124	99	80	1,404	
Thailand	Bangkok	272.5	249.9	269.0	256.7	216.4	178.0	171.8	160.3	154.9	198.1	234.2	262.0	2,623.8	
Thailand	Chiang Mai	272.8	257.1	294.5	279.0	198.4	156.0	120.9	117.8	144.0	201.5	216.0	254.2	2,512.2	
Thailand	Hat Yai	182.9	166.7	186.0	144.0	114.7	111.0	114.7	114.7	108.0	111.6	105.0	108.5	1,567.8	
Thailand	Nakhon Ratchasima	226.3	211.9	201.5	186.0	155.0	114.0	117.8	117.8	108.0	145.7	186.0	226.3	1,996.3	
Turkey	Ankara	77.5	98.9	161.2	189.0	260.4	306.0	350.3	328.6	276.0	198.4	132.0	71.3	2,449.6	
Turkey	Adana	132.7	144.2	180.2	206.1	265.6	296.4	311.5	292.4	259.4	223.3	169.3	122.2	2,603.2	
Turkey	Denizli	111.6	130.0	173.6	207.0	272.8	321.0	359.6	325.5	264.0	207.7	147.0	102.3	2,622.1	
Turkey	Trabzon	71.3	84.8	99.2	135.0	170.5	192.0	176.6	151.9	147.0	127.1	105.0	65.1	1,525.6	
United Arab; Emirates	Dubai	254.2	229.6	254.2	294.0	344.1	342.0	322.4	316.2	309.0	303.8	285.0	254.2	3,508.7	
Uzbekistan	Andijan	62.1	95.1	153.2	217.1	291.2	331.0	357.7	339.0	282.9	210.8	116.4	64.4	2,520.9	
Uzbekistan	Tashkent	117.8	127.1	164.3	216.0	303.8	363.0	384.4	365.8	300.0	226.3	150.0	105.4	2,823.9	
Vietnam	Da Lat	255	234	255	202	190	147	157	136	133	140	172	215	2,238	
Vietnam	Da Nang	139	145	188	209	246	239	253	218	176	145	120	103	2,182	
Vietnam	Hanoi	68.7	48.1	45.5	87.4	173.7	167.0	181.1	163.0	162.4	150.3	131.6	113.0	1,488.5	
Vietnam	Ho Chi Minh City	245	246	272	239	195	171	180	172	162	182	200	226	2,489	

== Europe ==
Sunshine hours for selected cities in Europe
Country	City	Jan	Feb	Mar	Apr	May	Jun	Jul	Aug	Sep	Oct	Nov	Dec	Year	Ref.
Albania	Tirana	124	125	165	191	263	298	354	327	264	218	127	88	2,544	
Albania	Vlorë	133	148	173	225	273	318	369	344	279	211	117	99	2,690	
Albania	Durrës	133	135	173	207	279	318	375	325	261	217	147	124	2,696	
Albania	Lezhë	130	131	173	201	270	306	363	322	258	208	138	118	2,617	
Armenia	Yerevan	104.5	136.8	186.5	206.5	267.1	326.6	353.9	333.7	291.5	217.0	138	91.0	2,675	
Austria	Vienna	70	104	155	217	249	259	273	266	194	133	71	57	2,048	
Austria	Innsbruck	103	126	179	198	209	213	230	221	187	163	102	91	2,048	
Azerbaijan	Baku	79	75	117	195	281	300	312	284	215	145	92	94	2,187	
Belarus	Minsk	34	72	133	185	270	267	271	251	154	103	39	28	1,807	
Belgium	Brussels	59	77	114	159	191	188	201	190	143	113	66	45	1,546	
Bosnia and Herzegovina	Banja Luka	65.1	73.5	133.3	171	226.3	252	282.1	263.5	180	136.4	75	58.9	1,899.3	
Bosnia and Herzegovina	Sarajevo	82.2	101.6	144.8	157.6	193.8	231.4	255.7	239.9	176.6	155.2	94.5	62.1	1,895.4	
Bulgaria	Sofia	88	114	160	182	230	258	302	288	220	164	106	66	2,177	
Bulgaria	Varna	99	119	154	204	259	278	318	318	236	163	105	92	2,345	
Croatia	Zagreb	59	96	140	175	234	244	281	256	187	131	66	45	1,913	
Croatia	Split	133	153	186	210	273	306	347	320	246	192	135	130	2,631	
Czech Republic	Prague	50	72	125	168	214	218	226	212	161	121	54	47	1,668	
Denmark	Aarhus	54	72	148	213	260	251	242	211	161	101	60	49	1,821	
Denmark	Copenhagen	56	83	152	226	271	260	246	231	175	107	60	45	1,912	
Denmark	Rønne	43	76	152	247	311	315	282	252	192	104	53	37	2,063	
Estonia	Tallinn	30	59	148	217	306	294	312	256	162	88	29	20	1,923	
Estonia	Vilsandi	37	69	150	226	316	314	330	271	176	100	38	24	2,066	
Faroe Islands	Tórshavn	14	36	71	106	124	125	111	98	80	49	20	6	840	
Finland	Helsinki	38	70	138	194	284	297	291	238	150	93	36	29	1,858	
France	Lyon	74	101	170	191	221	254	283	253	195	130	76	54	2,002	
France	Marseille	150	156	215	245	293	326	366	327	254	205	156	143	2,836	
France	Nice	156.7	166.1	218.0	229.2	270.9	309.8	349.3	223.2	249.8	191.1	151.5	145.2	2,760.5	
France	Paris	63	79	129	166	194	202	212	212	168	118	68	51	1,662	
Georgia	Tbilisi	99	102	142	171	213	249	256	248	206	164	103	93	2,046	
Germany	Berlin	47	74	121	159	220	222	217	211	156	112	51	37	1,626	
Germany	Frankfurt	50	80	121	178	211	219	233	219	156	103	51	41	1,662	
Germany	Dresden	62.0	82.1	127.0	187.3	222.0	221.3	233.8	222.8	164.2	103	67.9	60.0	1,770.4	
Greece	Athens	130	134	183	231	291	336	363	341	276	208	153	127	2,773	
Greece	Heraklion	119.9	132.3	181.5	234.8	298.5	356.2	368.3	343.5	303.8	275.8	206.9	115.4	2778.6	
Greece	Mytilene	115.4	129.3	185.6	226.2	295.0	355.7	382.9	352.0	289.2	219.8	144.4	95.7	2,791.2	
Greece	Rhodes	145.2	161.0	214.8	244.9	310.7	358.1	368.8	343.6	296.2	244.8	174.7	131.1	2993.9	
Greece	Samos	140.1	148.2	201.1	241.4	310.4	370.7	394.6	373.8	303.8	241.0	170.5	126.4	3022.0	
Greece	Ierapetra	155.6	158.8	208.3	240.2	319.1	355.4	384.7	367.7	307.5	235.9	201.3	167.0	3101.5	
Hungary	Budapest	62	93	137	177	234	250	271	255	187	141	69	52	1,988	
Hungary	Debrecen	57.6	85	146.8	190.3	251.4	266.4	295.3	274.3	201.7	155.1	72.2	47	2,043.1	
Hungary	Miskolc	40.8	69.5	128.3	177.2	224	224.2	254.5	236.4	180.8	141.6	53.2	36	1,766.5	
Iceland	Reykjavík	20	60	109	164	201	174	168	155	120	93	41	22	1,326.2	
Ireland	Dublin	59	75	109	160	195	179	164	157	129	103	71	53	1,453.2	
Italy	Cagliari	150	163	209	218	270	311	342	321	243	209	150	127	2,726	
Italy	Milan	59	96	152	177	211	243	285	251	186	130	66	59	1,915	
Italy	Naples	115	128	158	189	245	279	313	295	234	189	126	105	2,375	
Italy	Rome	121	133	167	201	264	285	332	298	237	195	129	112	2,473	
Latvia	Riga	31	62	127	183	264	288	264	229	153	93	39	22	1,754	
Lithuania	Vilnius	32	57	121	179	252	246	260	237	154	95	35	23	1,691	
Luxembourg	Luxembourg	43	82	118	165	208	210	232.5	208	159	108.5	57	43	1,634	
Malta	Valletta	169	178	227	254	310	337	377	352	270	224	195	161	3,054	
Moldova	Chișinău	75	80	125	187	254	283	299	295	226	169	75	58	2,126	
Monaco	Monaco	149.8	158.9	185.5	210	248.1	281.1	329.3	296.7	224.7	199	155.2	136.5	2,575	
Montenegro	Podgorica	123	126	170	194	251	276	340	314	252	201	126	109	2,481	
Netherlands	Amsterdam	69	94	146	197	230	217	225	203	154	116	66	58	1,779	
Netherlands	Eindhoven	69.0	87.9	139.8	186.4	214.4	209.0	213.2	199.1	161.0	122.4	73.4	56.5	1732.1	
North Macedonia	Skopje	87	113	161	198	245	276	323	305	248	188	115	80	2,339	
Norway	Bergen	32	69	109	215	254	239	230	196	116	88	43	22	1,613	
Norway	Oslo	40	76	126	178	220	250	246	216	144	86	51	35	1,668	
Norway	Tromsø	3	32	112	160	218	221	205	167	92	49	6	0	1,265	
Poland	Warsaw	44.6	66.5	139.4	210.1	272.4	288.8	295.4	280.2	193.1	122.6	50.6	33.6	1,997.1	
Portugal	Faro	182.1	172.0	242.6	253.6	305.0	326.9	360.6	344.9	279.1	227.0	191.6	159.0	3,044.4	
Portugal	Lisbon	143	157	208	234	291	303	353	344	261	214	156	143	2,806	
Portugal	Portimão	158.7	168.7	202.4	264.7	319.9	337.1	382.8	356.3	265.2	219.8	174.9	168.3	3,018.8	
Portugal	Porto	124	129	192	217	258	274	308	295	224	184	139	124	2,468	
Portugal	Tavira	170.8	193.4	206.0	277.4	334.6	358.1	395.3	370.4	290.5	243.0	172.5	164.9	3,176.9	
Romania	Bucharest	71	85	140	186	245	267	288	282	225	177	87	62	2,115	
Russia	Moscow	37	65	142	213	274	299	323	242	171	88	33	14	1,901	
Russia	Saint Petersburg	18.9	45.5	120.5	177.9	255.6	254.3	267.7	228.1	134.8	61.8	23.0	8.1	1,596.2	
Russia	Vladikavkaz	106	119	133	159	194	205	220	208	167	148	114	103	1,876	
Russia	Arkhangelsk	14.2	50.6	129.3	189.1	252.8	291.0	298.0	200.9	111.3	50.3	14.9	1.8	1,604.2	
Russia	Sochi	96	107	146	162	220	258	279	282	225	195	120	87	2,178	
Serbia	Belgrade	72	102	153	188	242	261	291	274	204	163	97	65	2,112	
Serbia	Niš	65	93	148	171	221	251	287	274	202	151	86	49	1,998	
Slovakia	Bratislava	65.5	99.3	153.7	218.6	258.1	269.4	286.5	273.3	194.5	134.6	69.5	51.9	2,074.9	
Slovenia	Ljubljana	71	114	149	178	235	246	293	264	183	120	66	56	1,974	
Spain	Alicante	181	180	227	247	277	302	330	304	250	217	173	164	2,851	
Spain	Almería	194	191	232	261	297	325	342	315	256	218	183	178	2,994	
Spain	Badajoz	146	163	226	244	292	335	376	342	260	206	155	114	2,860	
Spain	Barcelona	158	171	206	239	258	287	293	264	229	196	153	137	2,591	
Spain	Cáceres	156	175	232	247	297	336	379	348	261	205	158	129	2,922	
Spain	Cádiz	184	197	228	255	307	331	354	335	252	228	187	166	3,024	
Spain	Córdoba	174	186	218	235	289	323	363	336	248	205	180	148	2,905	
Spain	Huelva	165	171	229	255	296	341	367	340	268	211	176	151	2,970	
Spain	Málaga	171	179	212	238	289	327	343	310	248	209	166	152	2,842	
Spain	Madrid	148	157	214	231	272	310	359	335	261	198	157	124	2,769	
Spain	Murcia	189	190	223	256	289	323	353	317	239	217	186	172	2,967	
Spain	Seville	202.0	212.2	246.3	270.2	324.9	357.3	388.1	364.3	278.4	244.4	205.3	185.9	3,279.3	
Spain	Valencia	171	171	215	234	259	276	315	288	235	202	167	155	2,696	
Sweden	Gothenburg	44	69	167	211	239	256	234	196	168	99	47	32	1,762	
Sweden	Stockholm	40	72	139	185	254	292	260	221	154	99	54	33	1,803	
Switzerland	Zurich	48	77	125	159	186	204	230	208	151	93	50	35	1,566	
Switzerland	Geneva	61	96	161	187	212	246	269	242	184	116	65	48	1,887	
Switzerland	Sion	93	131	188	210	229	254	271	250	208	160	96	68	2,158	
Switzerland	Lugano	124	142	192	182	200	229	260	245	192	141	105	107	2,120	
Turkey	Istanbul	71	88	133	180	251	300	322	295	243	164	102	68	2,218	
Ukraine	Kyiv	31	57	124	180	279	270	310	248	210	155	60	31	1,955	
United Kingdom	Belfast	40.1	65.2	97.7	157.1	185.1	151.1	146.3	141.9	112.0	92.4	52.9	35.3	1,277.0	
United Kingdom	Cardiff	53.5	76.2	116.6	177	198.4	195.2	199.6	185.3	151.9	103.9	65	50.4	1,573	
United Kingdom	Edinburgh	53.5	78.5	114.8	144.6	188.4	165.9	172.2	161.5	128.8	101.2	71	46.2	1,426.6	
United Kingdom	Inverness	40.4	74.3	110.1	143.9	183.6	142.8	139.2	135.8	117.2	82.4	52.2	27.7	1,249.6	
United Kingdom	Kingston upon Hull	55.5	79	117.7	159.1	200.2	189.4	197.1	183.2	147.4	109.2	65.7	55.3	1,558.8	
United Kingdom	London	61.1	78.9	124.5	176.7	207.5	208.4	217.8	202.1	157.1	115.2	70.7	55.0	1,674.8	
United Kingdom	Manchester	32	50	99	153	175	153	171	154	116	79	42	43	1,265	
United Kingdom	Southampton	63.4	82.7	125.1	181.6	215.5	211.7	223.8	205.8	152	112.7	76.3	55.3	1,705.9	

== North America ==
Sunshine hours for selected cities in North America and Central America
Country	City	Jan	Feb	Mar	Apr	May	Jun	Jul	Aug	Sep	Oct	Nov	Dec	Year	Ref.
Canada	Calgary	119.5	144.6	177.2	220.2	249.4	269.9	314.1	284.0	207.0	175.4	121.1	114.0	2,396.3	
Canada	Churchill	79.7	117.7	177.8	198.2	197.0	243.0	281.7	225.9	112.0	58.1	55.3	53.1	1,799.5	
Canada	Edmonton	100.8	121.7	176.3	244.2	279.9	285.9	307.5	282.3	192.7	170.8	98.4	84.5	2,344.8	
Canada	Iqaluit	32.4	94.0	172.2	216.5	180.5	200.2	236.8	156.8	87.9	51.4	35.6	12.6	1,476.8	
Canada	Montreal	101.0	128.0	164.0	178.0	229.0	240.0	272.0	246.0	182.0	144.0	84.0	84.0	2,051.0	
Canada	Prince Rupert	40.1	65.2	103.0	145.8	171.1	154.5	149.7	149.7	115.7	72.4	43.0	32.1	1,242.1	
Canada	Toronto	85.9	111.3	161.0	180.0	227.7	259.6	279.6	245.6	194.4	154.3	88.9	78.1	2,066.4	
Canada	Vancouver	60.1	91.0	134.8	185.0	222.5	226.9	289.8	277.1	212.8	120.7	60.4	56.5	1,937.6	
Canada	Whitehorse	43.8	105.5	163.2	238.5	251.1	266.7	247.6	226.5	132.7	84.9	39.8	26.8	1,827.1	
Canada	Winnipeg	114.7	133.9	181.9	241.4	285.3	276.3	308.3	281.4	189.0	147.4	93.9	99.5	2,352.9	
Honduras	La Ceiba	170.5	192.1	217.0	234.0	213.9	192.0	201.5	217.0	174.0	151.9	144.0	151.9	2,259.8	
Mexico	La Paz	200	234	271	292	332	322	287	258	257	272	233	190	3,148	
Mexico	Mexico City	240	234	268	232	225	183	176	176	157	194	232	236	2,555	
Mexico	Monterrey	142	154	195	193	192	206	249	242	200	170	163	133	2,239	
Mexico	Villahermosa	168	185	252	215	278	217	252	245	167	150	170	144	2,443	
Nicaragua	Managua	263.5	254.2	291.4	276.0	229.4	186.0	151.9	195.3	210.0	223.2	231.0	248.0	2,759.9	
Panama	Panama City	228.9	245.2	183.9	173.1	108.5	116.3	106.1	118.1	99.2	103.9	139.8	120.5	1,743.5	
Puerto Rico	San Juan	237.4	231.2	282.0	268.3	255.2	259.4	280.8	267.8	234.7	227.2	202.4	217.4	2,963.8	
El Salvador	San Salvador	301	277	294	243	220	174	239	257	180	211	267	294	2,957	
Saint Pierre and Miquelon	Saint-Pierre	49.6	70.2	115.5	131.9	165.8	172.6	164.8	173.5	156.1	119.0	63.0	45.4	1,427.3	
United States	Albuquerque	234.2	225.3	270.2	304.6	347.4	359.3	335.0	314.2	286.7	281.4	233.8	223.3	3,415.4	
United States	Anchorage	82.9	120.5	195.8	235.3	288.7	274.7	250.1	203.9	159.8	117.1	80.6	51.8	2,061.2	
United States	Atlanta	164.0	171.7	220.5	261.2	288.6	284.8	273.8	258.6	227.5	238.5	185.1	164.0	2,738.3	
United States	Austin	163.8	169.3	205.9	205.8	227.1	285.5	317.2	297.9	233.8	215.6	168.3	153.5	2,643.7	
United States	Baltimore	155.4	164.0	215.0	230.7	254.5	277.3	290.1	264.4	221.8	205.5	158.5	144.5	2,581.7	
United States	Boise	109.3	151.9	238.6	281.4	335.5	351.6	399.8	358.8	303.6	238.1	119.6	105.2	2,993.4	
United States	Boston	163.4	168.4	213.7	227.2	267.3	286.5	300.9	277.3	237.1	206.3	143.2	142.3	2,633.6	
United States	Charlotte	173.3	180.3	234.8	269.6	292.1	289.2	290.0	272.9	241.4	230.5	178.4	168.5	2,821.0	
United States	Chicago	135.8	136.2	187.0	215.3	281.9	311.4	318.4	283.0	226.6	193.2	113.3	106.3	2,508.4	
United States	Cleveland	101.0	122.3	167.0	216.0	263.6	294.6	307.2	262.2	219.0	169.5	89.8	67.8	2,280.0	
United States	Columbus	110.6	126.3	162.0	201.8	243.4	258.1	260.9	235.9	212.0	183.1	104.2	84.3	2,182.6	
United States	Dallas	183.5	178.3	227.7	236.0	258.4	297.8	332.4	304.5	246.2	228.1	183.8	173.0	2,849.7	
United States	Denver	215.3	211.1	255.6	276.2	290.0	315.3	325.0	306.4	272.3	249.2	194.3	195.9	3,106.6	
United States	Detroit	119.9	138.3	184.9	217.0	275.9	301.8	317.0	283.5	227.6	176.0	106.3	87.7	2,435.9	
United States	El Paso	254.5	263.0	326.0	348.0	384.7	384.1	360.2	335.4	304.1	298.6	257.6	246.3	3,762.5	
United States	Fresno	141.5	196.9	286.2	335.5	398.9	412.2	428.2	399.6	345.9	302.3	189.9	127.1	3,564.2	
United States	Honolulu	213.5	212.7	259.2	251.8	280.6	286.1	306.2	303.1	278.8	244.0	200.4	199.5	3,035.9	
United States	Houston	143.4	155.0	192.5	209.8	249.2	281.3	293.9	270.5	236.5	228.8	168.3	148.7	2,577.9	
United States	Indianapolis	132.1	145.7	178.3	214.8	264.7	287.2	295.2	273.7	232.6	196.6	117.1	102.4	2,440.4	
United States	Jacksonville	189.4	193.8	257.9	286.4	303.9	283.6	282.0	262.4	228.2	214.6	193.9	183.6	2,879.7	
United States	Kansas City	183.7	174.3	223.9	257.8	285.0	305.5	329.3	293.9	240.5	213.6	155.3	147.1	2,809.9	
United States	Las Vegas	245.2	246.7	314.6	346.1	388.1	401.7	390.9	368.5	337.1	304.4	246.0	236.0	3,825.3	
United States	Los Angeles	225.3	222.5	267.0	303.5	276.2	275.8	364.1	349.5	278.5	255.1	217.3	219.4	3,254.2	
United States	Louisville	140.5	148.9	188.6	221.1	263.4	288.9	293.6	272.6	234.3	208.5	135.7	118.3	2,514.4	
United States	Memphis	166.6	173.8	215.3	254.6	301.5	320.6	326.9	307.0	251.2	245.9	173.0	151.9	2,888.3	
United States	Miami	219.8	216.9	277.2	293.8	301.3	288.7	308.7	288.3	262.2	260.2	220.8	216.1	3,154.0	
United States	Milwaukee	140.2	151.5	185.4	213.5	275.5	304.5	321.1	281.2	215.1	178.0	112.8	104.8	2,483.6	
United States	Minneapolis	156.7	178.3	217.5	242.1	295.2	321.9	350.5	307.2	233.2	181.0	112.8	114.3	2,710.7	
United States	Nashville	139.6	145.2	191.3	231.5	261.8	277.7	279.0	262.1	226.4	216.8	148.1	130.6	2,510.1	
United States	New Orleans	153.0	161.5	219.4	251.9	278.9	274.3	257.1	251.9	228.7	242.6	171.8	157.8	2,648.9	
United States	New York City	162.7	163.1	212.5	225.6	256.6	257.3	268.2	268.2	219.3	211.2	151.0	139.0	2,534.7	
United States	Nome	62.2	140.1	205.0	245.3	290.3	275.3	250.3	178.1	153.6	116.7	66.4	53.0	2,036.3	
United States	Oklahoma; City	200.8	189.7	244.2	271.3	295.2	326.1	356.6	329.3	263.7	245.1	186.5	180.9	3,089.4	
United States	Omaha	167.8	157.6	206.4	230.1	277.1	314.0	332.5	296.3	245.5	217.5	148.0	134.1	2,726.9	
United States	Philadelphia	155.7	154.7	202.8	217.0	245.1	271.2	275.6	260.1	219.3	204.5	154.7	137.7	2,498.4	
United States	Phoenix	256.0	257.2	318.4	353.6	401.0	407.8	378.5	360.8	328.6	308.9	256.0	244.8	3,871.6	
United States	Pittsburgh	93.9	108.5	155.4	182.8	217.4	242.2	254.9	228.4	196.7	167.3	99.4	74.4	2,021.3	
United States	Portland (OR)	85.6	116.4	191.1	221.1	276.1	290.2	331.9	298.1	235.7	151.7	79.3	63.7	2,340.9	
United States	Raleigh	163.8	173.1	228.9	250.7	258.4	267.7	259.5	239.6	217.6	215.4	174.0	157.6	2,606.3	
United States	Richmond (VA)	172.5	179.7	233.3	261.6	288.0	306.4	301.4	278.9	237.9	222.8	183.5	163.0	2,829.0	
United States	Sacramento	145.5	201.3	278.0	329.6	406.3	419.5	440.2	406.9	347.8	296.7	194.9	141.1	3,607.8	
United States	Salt Lake City	127.4	163.1	241.9	269.1	321.7	360.5	380.5	352.5	301.1	248.1	150.4	113.1	3,029.4	
United States	San Antonio	159.4	169.7	215.5	209.7	221.8	275.9	308.8	293.9	234.9	218.0	171.9	149.7	2,629.2	
United States	San Diego	239.3	227.4	261.0	276.2	250.5	242.4	304.7	295.0	253.3	243.4	230.1	231.3	3,054.6	
United States	San Francisco	185.9	207.7	269.1	309.3	325.1	311.4	313.3	287.4	271.4	247.1	173.4	160.6	3,061.7	
United States	Seattle	69.8	108.8	178.4	207.3	253.7	268.4	312.0	281.4	221.7	142.6	72.7	52.9	2,169.7	
United States	St. Louis	161.2	158.3	198.3	223.5	266.5	291.9	308.9	269.8	236.1	208.4	140.9	129.9	2,593.7	
United States	Tampa	199.9	202.7	267.5	299.1	314.5	277.8	265.3	249.5	223.0	233.9	201.7	191.6	2,926.5	
United States	Tucson	259.9	258.2	320.7	357.2	400.8	396.9	342.7	335.6	316.4	307.4	264.4	245.8	3,806.0	
United States	Tulsa	175.8	171.7	219.6	244.4	266.7	294.8	334.7	305.3	232.5	218.6	161.1	160.8	2,786.0	
United States	Virginia Beach	171.5	175.2	229.3	252.8	271.7	280.1	278.3	260.4	231.4	208.3	175.7	160.4	2,695.1	
United States	Washington, D.C.	144.6	151.8	204.0	228.2	260.5	283.2	280.5	263.1	225.0	203.6	150.2	133.0	2,527.7	
United States	Wichita	190.9	186.4	230.4	257.8	289.8	305.0	342.1	309.2	245.6	226.3	170.2	168.7	2,922.4	
United States	Yuma	268.4	270.8	335.5	365.5	407.4	415.4	392.6	375.6	341.7	319.6	270.1	252.7	4,015.3	

== South America ==
Sunshine hours for selected cities in South America
Country	City	Jan	Feb	Mar	Apr	May	Jun	Jul	Aug	Sep	Oct	Nov	Dec	Year	Ref.
Argentina	Buenos Aires	279.0	240.8	229.0	220.0	173.6	132.0	142.6	173.6	189.0	227.0	252.0	266.6	2525.2	
Argentina	Córdoba	257.3	229.6	204.6	189.0	170.5	150.0	170.5	204.6	213.0	238.7	255.0	251.1	2533.9	
Argentina	La Plata	251.1	229.6	210.8	186.0	155.0	120.0	127.1	161.2	171.0	207.7	225.0	238.7	2283.2	
Argentina	Mendoza	297.6	257.6	235.6	219.0	195.3	168.0	182.9	229.4	225.0	282.1	294.0	285.2	2871.7	
Argentina	Salta	164.3	134.4	105.4	117.0	136.4	120.0	173.6	195.3	162.0	182.9	171.0	164.3	1826.6	
Argentina	Ushuaia	180.2	150.4	124.9	92.7	78.0	50.3	35.0	58.3	87.6	113.0	140.0	170.8	1281.2	
Bolivia	La Paz	182.9	152.6	148.8	165.0	222.7	240.0	235.6	217.0	189.0	179.8	171.0	186.0	2288.9	
Brazil	Belém	130.3	103.1	111.1	132.8	186.7	228.7	250.8	266.4	242.4	231.8	191.7	159.1	2234.9	
Brazil	Belo Horizonte	176.0	190.8	194.9	210.7	221.2	229.9	240.5	241.5	202.5	196.5	166.9	153.3	2424.7	
Brazil	Brasília	150.9	158.9	166.5	204.6	239.5	254.3	268.9	264.4	210.5	183.1	139.9	126.8	2368.3	
Brazil	Curitiba	160.5	151.3	163.1	155.5	148.8	141.3	162.1	173.0	124.3	136.7	163.5	164.7	1844.8	
Brazil	Fortaleza	222.0	181.2	157.0	147.1	201.3	215.5	259.4	288.3	284.4	294.1	288.5	265.4	2804.2	
Brazil	Manaus	112.7	93.4	95.8	107.3	144.2	186.8	218.5	215.7	183.8	158.1	140.0	118.5	1774.8	
Brazil	Porto Alegre	227.2	195.2	202.4	166.0	146.9	115.6	131.4	145.3	145.8	178.0	215.2	232.4	2101.4	
Brazil	Rio de Janeiro	194.3	199.8	189.3	194.0	190.0	202.1	196.0	199.7	135.7	156.0	163.7	166.7	2187.3	
Brazil	Recife	233.0	210.5	227.6	198.3	186.0	161.1	175.2	195.2	215.6	242.6	245.4	246.0	2536.5	
Brazil	Salvador	246.9	215.0	227.2	194.1	165.8	147.8	169.1	189.1	211.4	235.5	210.9	230.2	2443.0	
Brazil	São Paulo	139.1	153.5	161.6	169.3	167.6	160.0	169.0	173.1	144.5	157.9	152.8	145.1	1893.5	
Chile	Antofagasta	319.3	291.0	294.5	252.0	229.4	207.0	204.6	213.9	219.0	260.4	276.0	310.0	3077.1	
Chile	Calama	353.4	305.1	319.3	312.0	306.9	297.0	310.0	316.2	321.0	356.5	363.0	365.8	3926.2	
Chile	Concepción	341.0	278.0	255.0	191.0	133.0	114.0	129.0	162.0	197.0	254.0	296.0	331.0	2681.0	
Chile	Santiago	362.7	302.3	272.8	201.0	155.0	120.0	145.7	161.2	186.0	248.0	306.0	347.2	2807.9	
Chile	Valdivia	257.3	228.8	204.6	123.0	68.2	45.0	65.1	89.9	111.0	127.1	189.0	207.7	1716.7	
Colombia	Barranquilla	283.0	245.0	241.0	211.0	187.0	194.0	217.0	208.0	166.0	167.0	191.0	252.0	2561.0	
Colombia	Bogotá	156.0	128.0	107.0	88.0	83.0	94.0	114.0	117.0	109.0	96.0	103.0	138.0	1328.0	
Colombia	Cali	183.0	155.8	166.5	139.0	147.1	153.1	189.9	175.1	157.4	151.1	153.8	170.1	1941.9	
Colombia	Medellín	175.5	149.0	154.2	127.9	138.9	173.0	203.2	191.6	153.4	132.9	136.4	156.2	1892.2	
Ecuador	Guayaquil	102.3	101.7	139.5	150.0	167.4	123.0	127.1	133.3	144.0	136.4	120.0	136.4	1581.1	
Ecuador	Quito	197.0	140.0	122.0	136.0	164.0	189.0	249.0	256.0	196.0	177.0	197.0	215.0	2238.0	
Falkland Islands	Stanley	198.0	161.0	169.0	115.0	77.0	57.0	69.0	90.0	128.0	189.0	200.0	198.0	1651.0	
French Guiana	Cayenne	94.3	89.9	119.0	118.1	118.8	148.6	196.5	229.8	255.2	251.1	217.3	137.5	1976.0	
Guyana	Georgetown	201.0	208.6	219.7	197.9	178.8	156.7	201.6	233.7	229.8	235.3	210.9	186.6	2460.6	
Paraguay	Asunción	276.0	246.0	254.0	228.0	205.0	165.0	195.0	223.0	204.0	242.0	270.0	295.0	2803.0	
Peru	Arequipa	223.2	189.3	244.9	294.0	288.3	291.0	291.4	310.0	297.0	303.8	309.0	291.4	3333.3	
Peru	Iquitos	167.4	149.7	151.9	159.0	173.6	189.0	213.9	226.3	213.0	198.4	180.0	158.1	2,180.3	
Peru	Lima	179.1	169.0	139.2	184.0	116.4	50.6	28.6	32.3	37.3	65.3	89.0	139.2	1230.0	
Uruguay	Montevideo	294.9	230.6	222.8	179.6	164.2	129.7	139.7	164.4	182.3	239.0	248.9	285.3	2481.4	
Venezuela	Caracas	229.4	217.5	235.6	183.0	182.9	183.0	210.8	217.0	213.0	210.8	210.0	213.9	2506.9	
Venezuela	Maracaibo	300.0	279.0	286.0	257.0	243.0	253.0	301.0	279.0	272.5	283.0	258.0	273.0	3284.2	
Venezuela	Maracay	279.2	268.8	288.3	225	207.7	201	220.1	229.4	228	235.6	246	269.7	2904.8	
Venezuela	Ciudad Bolívar	248.0	235.2	263.5	234.0	226.3	201.0	232.5	248.0	252.0	260.4	249.0	244.9	2,894.8	

== Oceania ==
Sunshine hours for selected cities in Oceania
Country	City	Jan	Feb	Mar	Apr	May	Jun	Jul	Aug	Sep	Oct	Nov	Dec	Year	Ref.
Australia	Tennant Creek	285.2	257.1	285.2	294.0	300.7	294.0	316.2	328.6	306.0	313.1	294.0	291.4	3,565.5	
Australia	Oodnadatta	337.9	315.0	313.1	273.0	244.9	231.0	254.2	275.9	291.0	316.2	321.0	341.0	3,514.2	
Australia	Broome	257.3	212.8	263.5	294.0	291.4	282.0	306.9	325.5	312.0	337.9	336.0	291.4	3,510.7	
Australia	Alice Springs	306.0	276.8	300.7	285.0	263.5	252.0	282.1	306.9	300.0	313.1	303.0	310.0	3,499.1	
Australia	Perth	356.5	314.9	295.5	246.0	211.7	180.6	188.4	219.8	232.4	299.8	320.4	359.4	3,229.5	
Australia	Townsville	254.2	211.9	244.9	243.9	244.9	231.0	263.5	279.0	291.0	306.9	291.0	288.3	3,141.1	
Australia	Darwin	176.7	162.4	210.8	261.0	297.6	297.0	313.1	319.3	297.0	291.4	252.0	213.9	3,092.2	
Australia	Brisbane	263.5	223.2	232.5	234.0	235.6	198.0	238.7	266.6	270.0	275.9	270.0	265.4	2,968.4	
Australia	Canberra	294.5	254.3	251.1	219.0	186.0	156.0	179.8	217.0	231.0	266.6	267.0	291.4	2,813.7	
Australia	Adelaide	325.5	285.3	266.6	219.0	167.4	138.0	148.8	186.0	204.0	257.3	273.0	294.5	2,765.4	
Australia	Cairns	210.8	173.6	201.5	204.0	210.8	216.0	229.4	251.1	261.0	272.8	255.0	232.5	2,718.5	
Australia	Sydney	232.5	201.6	210.8	207.0	198.4	180.0	207.7	244.9	240.0	244.9	231.0	241.8	2,628.0	
Australia	Launceston	285.2	256.9	241.8	198.0	155.0	135.0	142.6	170.5	201.0	254.2	267.0	282.1	2,589.3	
Australia	Norfolk Island	238.7	203.4	204.6	198.0	189.1	168.0	186.0	223.2	219.0	241.8	249.0	241.8	2,556.8	
Australia	Melbourne	269.7	226.8	223.2	177.0	145.7	123.0	136.4	167.4	186.0	223.2	222.0	260.4	2,373.0	
Australia	Hobart	254.2	221.2	207.7	174.0	142.6	129.0	148.8	176.7	189.0	226.3	222.0	244.9	2,336.0	
Papua New Guinea	Port Moresby	182	158	184	200	211	200	203	222	213	231	243	216	2,463	
Solomon Islands	Honiara	186.0	155.4	198.4	192.0	210.8	198.0	186.0	204.6	192.0	226.3	216.0	164.3	2,330.0	
New Zealand	Christchurch	224.4	190.5	177.4	155.6	133.3	117.7	124.8	149.0	166.6	201.3	215.3	214.3	2,070.2	
New Zealand	Wellington	240.3	205.0	194.7	153.8	126.0	102.3	111.4	137.2	163.2	191.1	210.8	222.9	2,058.7	
New Zealand	Hamilton	229.8	192.9	193.3	165.1	138.3	112.8	126.4	144.1	147.5	174.8	187.1	207.6	2,019.6	
New Zealand	Auckland	228.8	194.9	189.2	157.3	139.8	110.3	128.1	142.9	148.6	178.1	188.1	197.2	2,003.1	
New Zealand	Dunedin	179.6	158.0	146.1	125.9	108.4	95.3	110.6	122.2	136.8	165.5	166.9	168.3	1,683.7	
Fiji	Suva	192.2	178	170.5	153.0	145.7	141.0	136.4	142.6	135.0	164.3	168.0	195.3	1,922.0	
USA (American Samoa)	Pago Pago	165.3	150.3	179.2	132.2	123.3	113.7	148.0	168.0	135.0	196.0	159.6	156.8	1,849.1	

Antarctica Place Annual sunshine hours Vostok Station: 3,761 Esperanza Base: 1,126

== See also ==
- List of cities by average temperature
- List of cities by average precipitation
- List of weather records
