= List of settlements in Lasithi =

These are a list of settlements in Lasithi, Crete, Greece.

- Achladia
- Agia Triada
- Agios Antonios
- Agios Georgios, Oropedio Lasithiou
- Agios Georgios, Siteia
- Agios Ioannis
- Agios Konstantinos
- Agios Nikolaos
- Agios Stefanos
- Anatoli
- Apidia
- Armenoi
- Avrakontes
- Chamezi
- Chandras
- Choumeriakos
- Chrysopigi
- Elounta
- Episkopi
- Exo Lakkonia
- Exo Mouliana
- Exo Potamoi
- Ferma
- Fourni
- Gdochia
- Goudouras
- Gra Lygia
- Ierapetra
- Kalamafka
- Kalo Chorio
- Kaminaki
- Karydi, Agios Nikolaos
- Karydi, Itanos
- Kastelli
- Kato Chorio
- Kato Metochi
- Katsidoni
- Kavousi
- Koutsouras
- Kritsa
- Kroustas
- Krya
- Lagou
- Lastros
- Latsida
- Limnes
- Lithines
- Loumas
- Makry Gialos
- Makrylia
- Males
- Marmaketo
- Maronia
- Mesa Lakkonia
- Mesa Lasithi
- Mesa Mouliana
- Meseleroi
- Milatos
- Mitato
- Mochlos
- Monastiraki
- Mournies
- Myrsini
- Myrtos
- Mythoi
- Neapoli
- Nikithianos
- Oreino
- Pacheia Ammos
- Palaikastro
- Pappagiannades
- Pefkoi
- Perivolakia
- Piskokefalo
- Plati
- Praisos
- Prina
- Psychro
- Riza
- Roussa Ekklisia
- Schinokapsala
- Sfaka
- Siteia
- Skinias
- Skopi
- Stavrochori
- Stavromenos
- Tourloti
- Tzermiado
- Vainia
- Vasiliki
- Voulismeni
- Vrachasi
- Vrouchas
- Vryses
- Xerokambos
- Zakros
- Zenia
- Ziros

== See also ==
- List of towns and villages in Greece
