= Kyrbas =

Greek mythological figure

In Greek mythology, Kyrbas was a hero whose main achievement was the foundation of Ierapetra in Crete.
