= Myrsini (disambiguation) =

Myrsini is a town in Elis, Greece.

Myrsini (Greek: Μυρσίνη) can also refer to:

- Myrsini, Laconia
- Myrsini, Lasithi, a village in Lasithi
- Myrsini, Preveza, a village in the Preveza regional unit
- Myrsini, Tinos, a village in the island of Tinos

== See also ==
- Myrsina, or Myrtle, a Greek fairy tale
- Myrsina, Grevena
- Myrsine (mythology), a woman in Greek mythology
