= Episkopi =

Episkopi (Greek: Επισκοπή), or Latinised forms Episcopia or Piscopia, may refer to the following places:

Cyprus

- Episkopi Bay, on the southeast coast
- Episkopi, Limassol, a village on Episkopi Bay
- Episkopi Cantonment, a British military base on Episkopi Bay
- Episkopi, Paphos, a village in the southwest interior
- Episcopia or Piscopia, former names for Bellapais Abbey in Northern Cyprus

Greece

- Episkopi, Heraklion, a town in Crete
- Episkopi, Lasithi, a town in Crete
- Episkopi, Rethymno, a town in Rethymno, Crete

Italy

- Episcopia, Italy, a town and comune in Potenza in Basilicata

== See also ==
- Cornaro Piscopia, a branch of the Venetian Cornaro family named after Episkopi, Limassol
