= Livadi Beach =

Beach in Crete, Greece

Coordinates: 35.0184°N 25.8584°E

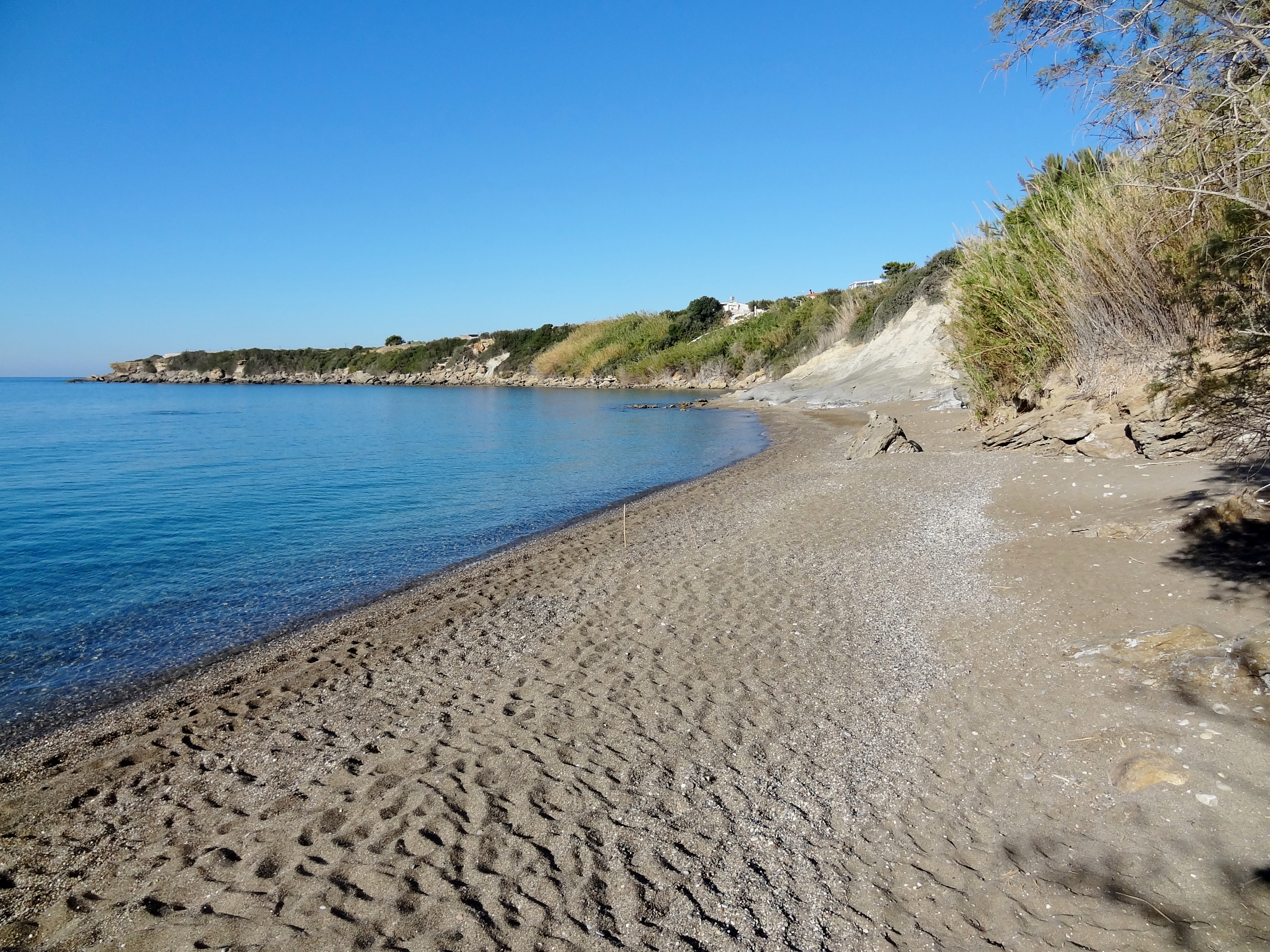
Livadi beach

Livadi beach is located in Ferma, 10 kilometers east of Ierapetra, in Crete. Next to the beach are the most hotels.

Livadi is a small cove with pebbles and crystal clear waters. It is semi-organized beach with an amazing landscape of lush vegetation, tall cliffs and steep cliffs.
