= Agios Ioannis, Lasithi =

Agios Ioannis Άγιος Ιωάννης
- Community
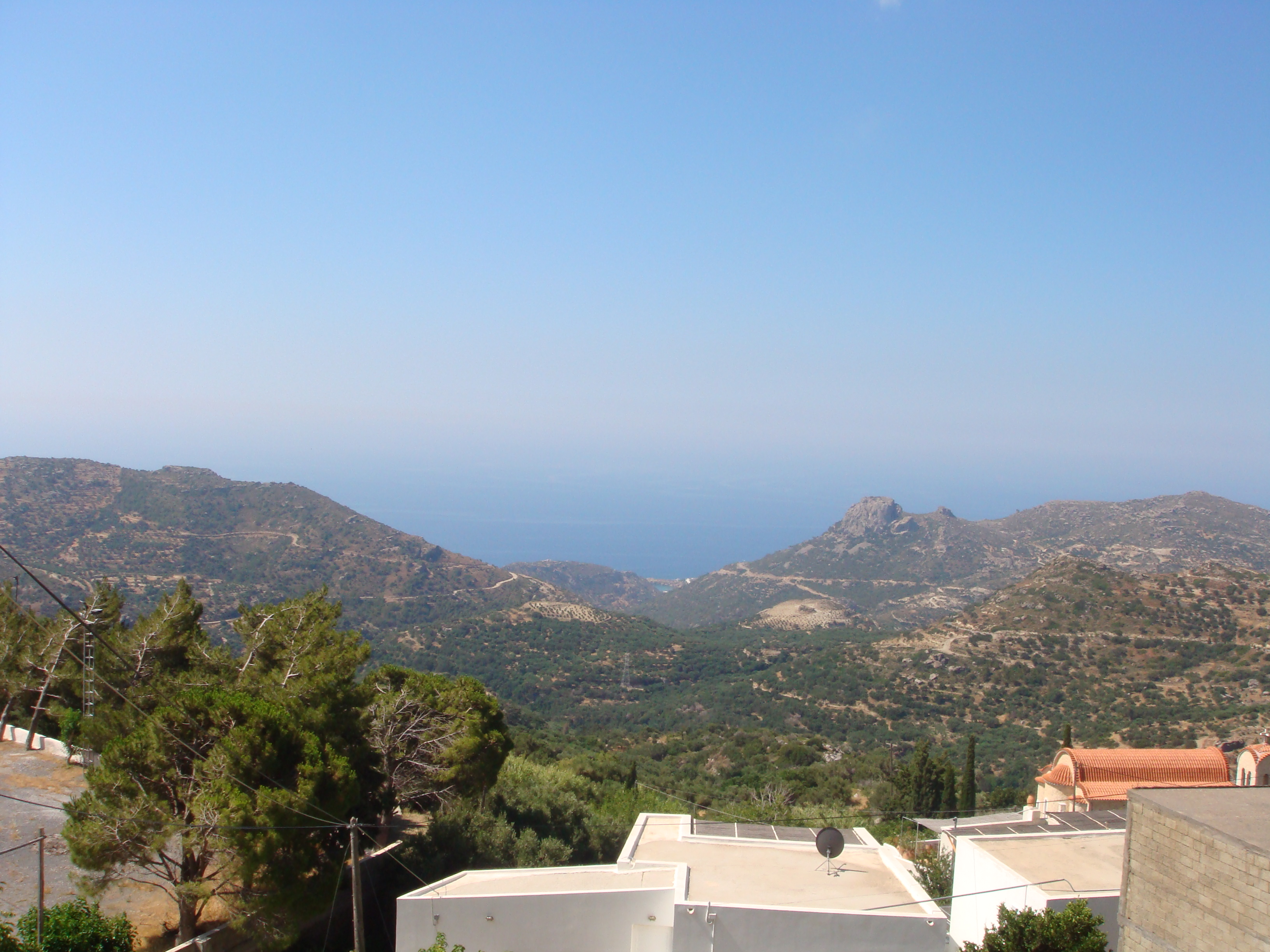

- Location within Greece
- Coordinates: 35°03′10″N 25°50′46″E
- Country: Greece
- Administrative region: Crete
- Regional unit: Lasithi
- Municipality: Ierapetra
- Municipal unit: Ierapetra

Population (2021)
  - Community: 1,154
- Time zone: UTC+2 (EET)
  - Summer (DST): UTC+3 (EEST)

Agios Ioannis is a village of Lasithi prefecture, in the municipality of Ierapetra, Crete, Greece. It lies 17 kilometers north-east of Ierapetra, 7 kilometers west of Schinokapsala, and 9 kilometers from the sea (Koutsounari settlement). It is south of Thripti mountain. The majority of the people that lived here have moved during the last three decades to the beach settlements of Koutsounari and Ferma, or to Ierapetra. The water from the springs follows a route across "Milonas gorge" and ends in the sea some 7 kilometers further. In the Aghios Ioannis area there are also a number of beaches, including the Long beach and Aghia Fotia.

The community of Agios Ioannis is represented by a five-member council headed by the Emmanouil Kidonakis. The community office is located in Koutsounari.
