= Pachia Ammos Beach =

Beach in Crete, Greece

Coordinates: 35°06′35″N 25°48′26″E

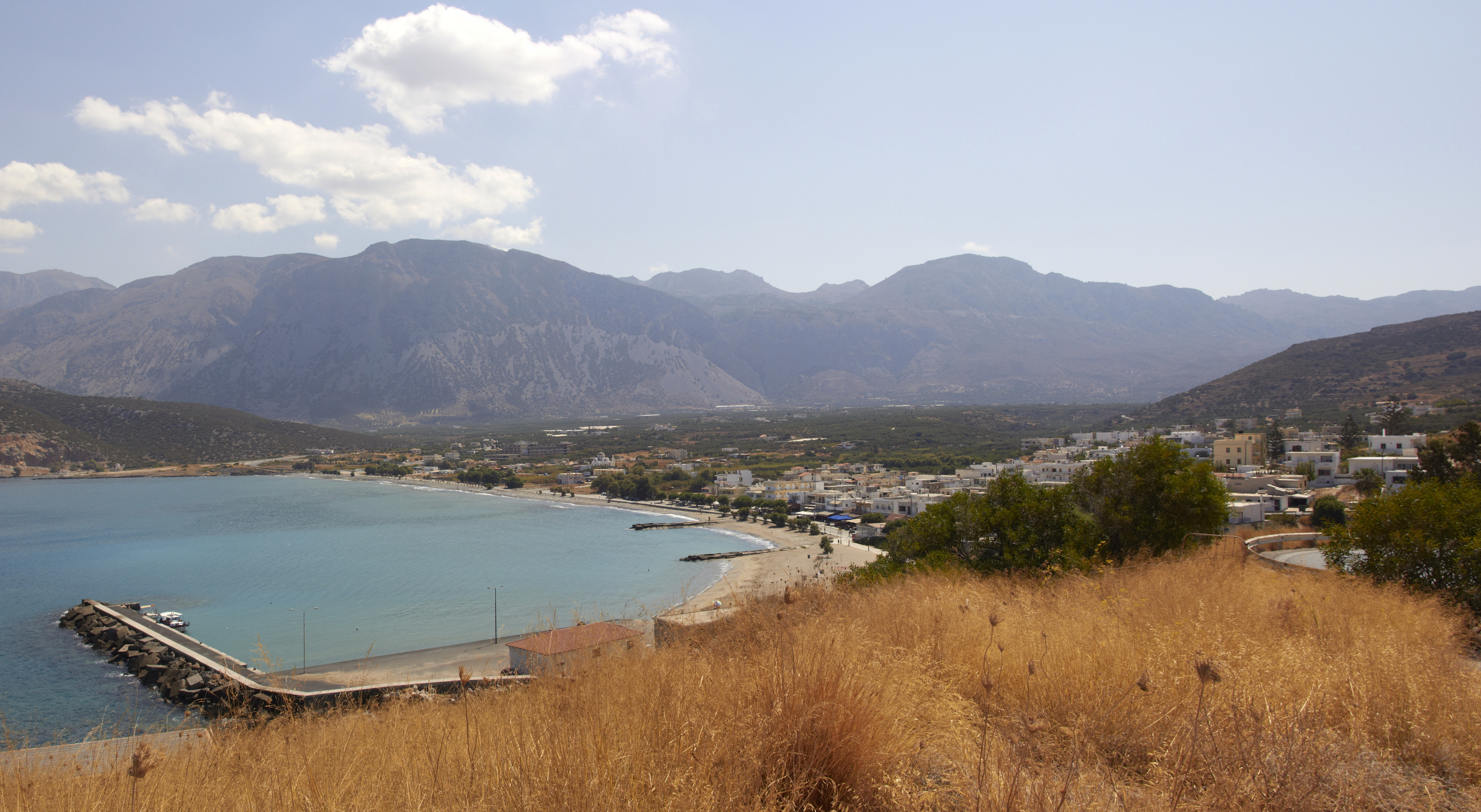
Pachia Ammos

The beach Pachia Ammos, located 20 km east of Agios Nikolaos and about 10 km from Ierapetra, in front of the village Pachia Ammos in Crete.

It is a beach with thick sand and pebbles, which is exposed to winds. The western part of the beach, however, is protected by the breakwater of the harbor that is there, when the sea is calm and clear. The beach at this point, is organized with umbrellas and sunbeds.
