= Kalamaki beach =

Kalamaki beach can mean:

- Kalamaki beach (Crete), a beach on the Greek island of Crete
- Kalamaki beach, a beach on the Greek island of Zakythos that is part of the Zakynthos Marine Park
- Kalamaki beach (Peleponnese), a beach in the Greek Peleponnese region
