= Koutsounari Long Beach =

Beach in Greece

Coordinates: 35.0050°N 25.8196°E

Koutsounari Long Beach is located 5 km (3.1 mi) east of the village Koutsounari near Ierapetra. Extends for 5 km (3.1 mi) so called Long beach. The development of the beach began after 1970 and it was mild. The beach is not organized, except for a small part of which has sun loungers, umbrellas and a canteen. The eastern part of the beach, located beneath known tavern and is also very organized. Along the rest of the beach, trees provide shade to visitors. All along, the beach has small pebbles in some places relatively shallow waters. Due to its length, the long beach is ideal for water sports.
