= Stomio =

Stomio may refer to the following places in Greece:

- Stomio, Larissa
- Stomio, Lasithi
