= Aghios Andreas Beach =

Beach in Crete, Greece

Coordinates: 37.663780°N 21.310219°E

The beach of Agios Andreas is just outside the town center of Ierapetra in Crete.

It is a sandy beach with a rocky coastline and crystal clear waters, like all beaches in Ierapetra. Also, the beach is ideal for snorkelling.
