= Ierapetra Mosque =

Former mosque in Ierapetra, Greece

- Τζαμί της Ιεράπετρας
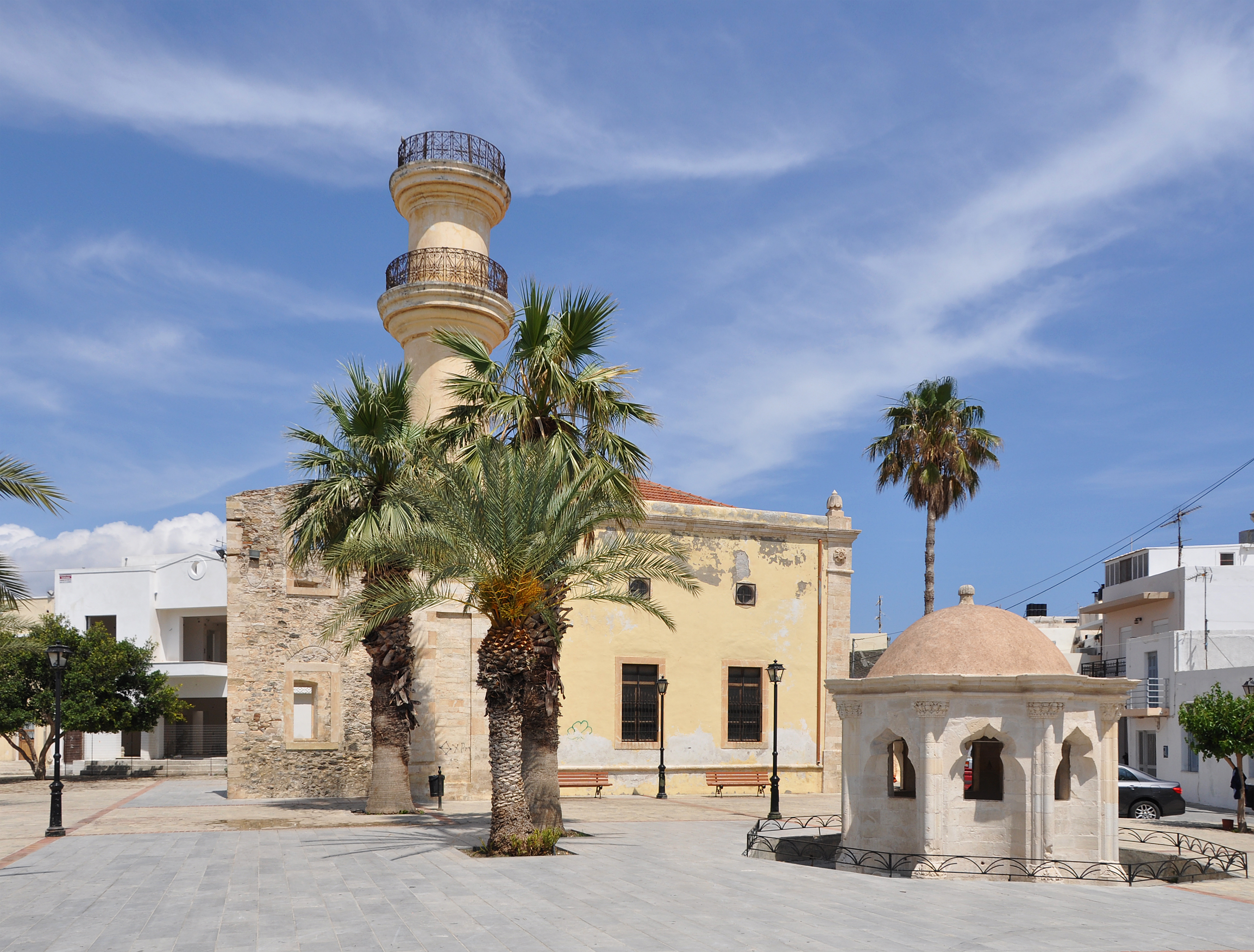
- The former mosque, with its şadırvan in the foreground

- Location of the former mosque in Greece

Religion
- Affiliation: Islam (former)
- Ecclesiastical or organizational status: Mosque (c. 1892–1910s)
- Status: Abandoned (as a mosque); Partially preserved

Location
- Location: Ierapetra, Crete
- Country: Greece
- Interactive map of Ierapetra Mosque
- Coordinates: 35°00′20″N 25°44′08″E

Architecture
- Type: Mosque
- Style: Ottoman
- Completed: c. 1892

Specifications
- Minaret: 1 (partially collapsed)
- Materials: Stone; brick; timber; tiles

The Mosque of Ierapetra (Greek: Τζαμί της Ιεράπετρας), formerly known as the Hamidiye Mosque (Turkish: Hamidiye Camii), is a former mosque located in the town of Ierapetra, on the island of Crete, Greece. Built in c. 1892, during the Ottoman era, the mosque was abandoned during the 1910s.

== Overview ==
Based on inscription found in the mosque itself, it was erected around 1891-1892, perhaps on the site of a previous mosque or perhaps a church dedicated to Saint John. The upper part of the minaret collapsed during the 1953 earthquake.

Ierapetra's Mosque is a square building with a wooden, hipped roof covered with tiles. Its architecture style features elements derived from the neoclassical and eclectic trends that reached Crete during the last decades of the 19th century.

The mihrab, or praying niche, is found on the southeast inner side of the building. It is surrounded by a carved painted panel with a pedimented finial on the tympanum of which is placed an inverted medal bearing an Arabic inscription. The minaret, now roofless, stands on the northwestern corner of the mosque. Surviving up to the second balcony, its uppermost part fell in the 1953 earthquake, and was subsequently partially restored.

The Ottoman fountain is located to the southwest of the mosque, and together they once constituted a remarkable complex of Ottoman architecture in Crete. The fountain is an octagonal building with domed roofs, made with worked stones of various sizes. The outflow holes, as well as water collection troughs on all sides, are preserved.

== See also ==
- Islam in Greece
- List of former mosques in Greece
- Ottoman Crete
