= Males, Crete =

Males Μάλες
- Community
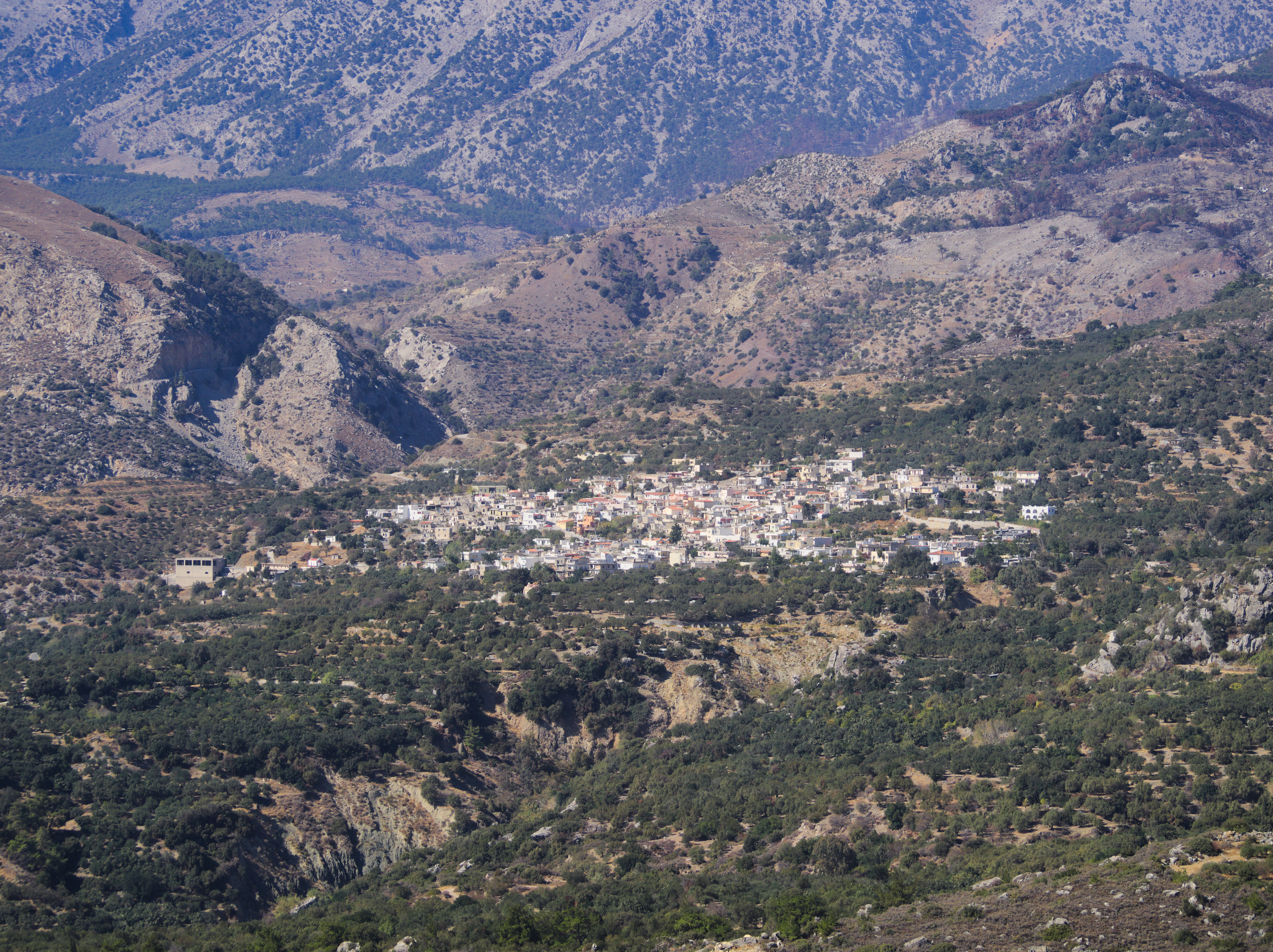
- View of Males from southeast

- Location within Greece
- Coordinates: 35°05′N 25°35′E
- Country: Greece
- Administrative region: Crete
- Regional unit: Lasithi
- Municipality: Ierapetra
- Municipal unit: Ierapetra

Population (2021)
  - Community: 388
- Time zone: UTC+2 (EET)
  - Summer (DST): UTC+3 (EEST)

Males is a historic village in the municipality of Ierapetra in Lasithi prefecture on Crete. It is situated 25 kilometers north-west of Ierapetra, 40 from Agios Nikolaos and 12 kilometers away from the sea (Myrtos village). Together with nearby hamlets Hristos and Metaxohori Males until recently formed the Nea Mala municipality. It is built 550 meters above sea level, south east of Dikti mountain, in an area rich in vegetation. It is built where the ancient city of Mala was.

In the Venetian period it was the most populous village of Ierapetra. The village has many interesting churches from the Byzantine and Venetian period. The forest surrounding of Males is unique on Crete, despite the fires that have destroyed much of the ecosystem of this place in recent years. The forest Selakano is still mostly undisturbed. It is the most important forest of Crete, some 4 kilometers away in the north western part of the village. Three kilometers from the settlement on the road to Ierapetra lies "Panagia Exacousti" monastery.
