= Milona Gorge =

Geography
- Coordinates: 35.035547°N 25.8499°E
- Interactive map of Milona Gorge

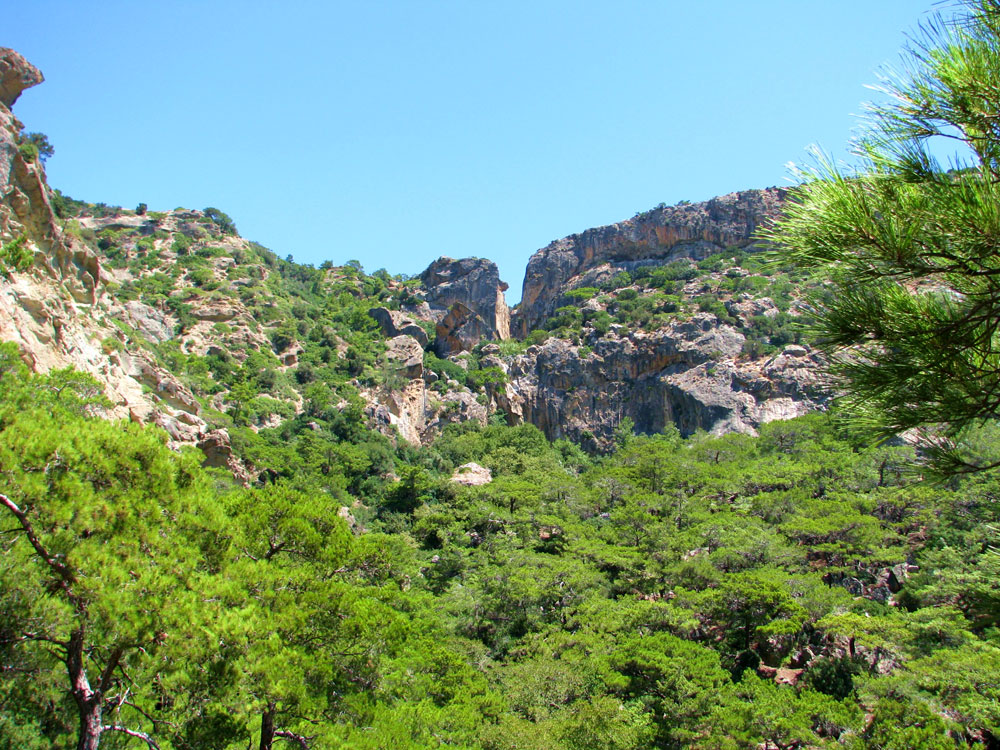
The gorge of Milona in Summer

The Milona Gorge is a gorge, situated near the village of Agios Ioannis, in the municipally of Ierapetra in Crete. There is a 10- to 15-minute drive from the town of Ierapetra to the gorge. It has a large waterfall at the end of the walking path. The walking path is only a 20-minute walk from the road, and it is quite easy to follow. At the end of the path is the 40-metre height fall of Milona. The best season to cross the path is in spring, since the waterfall will have plenty water, while in summer, although nice as well it can be much drier. However, there is a second, shorter path beside it, so one can switch paths if necessary.

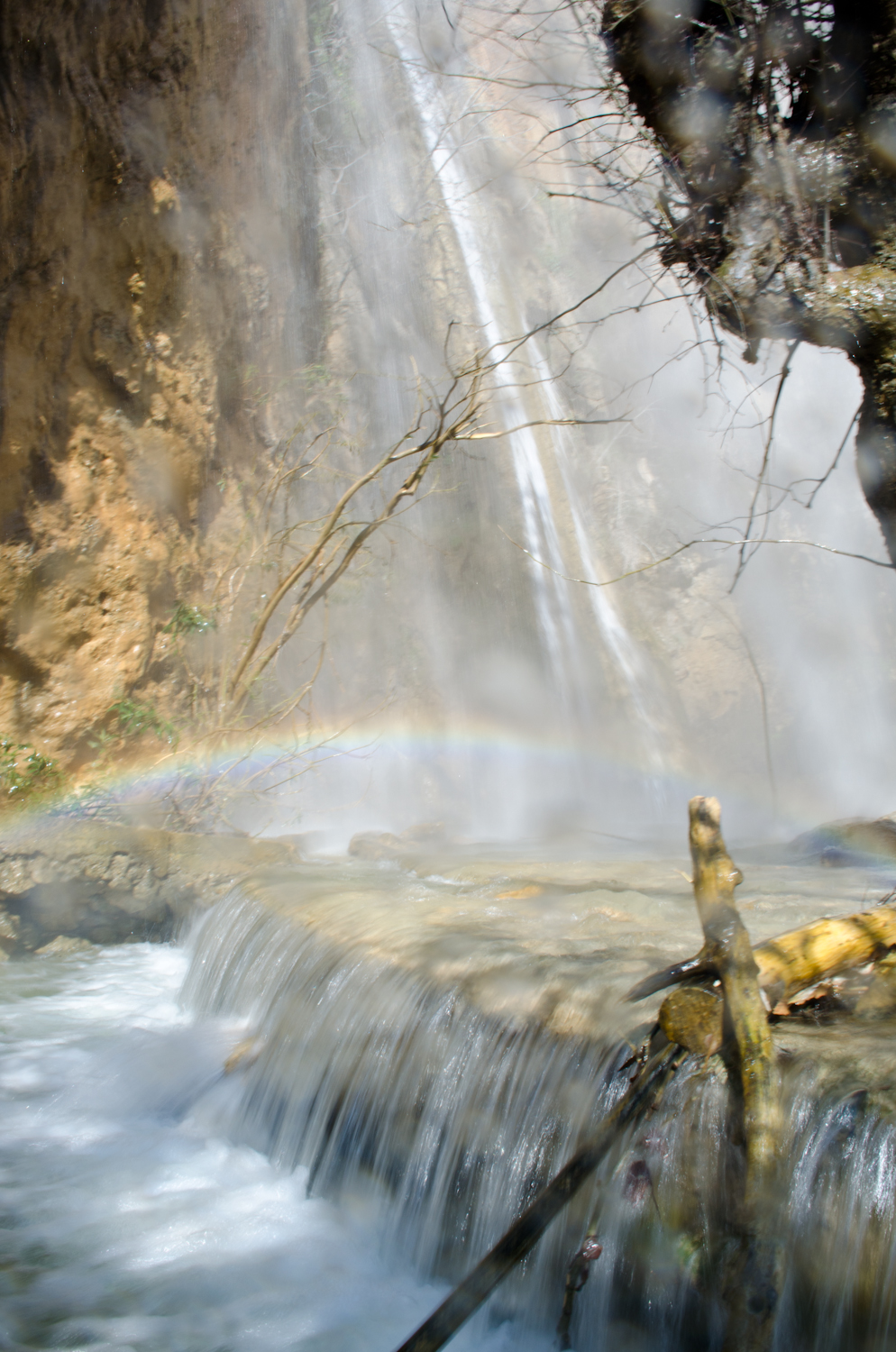
Inside the main waterfall of Milonas Gorge in Spring
