= Ano Simi =

Ano Simi Epano Simi
- Village
- Location in Greece
- Coordinates: 35°02′49″N 25°29′51″E
- Country: Greece
- Prefecture: Lasithi
- Municipality: Ierapetra
- Elevation: 900 m (3,000 ft)
- Time zone: UTC+2 (Eastern European Time)
  - Summer (DST): UTC+3 (Eastern European Summer Time)

Ano Simi is a village on Crete in the prefecture of Lasithi. It is part of Ierapetra municipality and borders Viannos municipality. It lies about 900 meters above sea level, south of Mount Dikti in what is probably the most wooded area of Crete. It is about 1 kilometer from Kato Simi, and 32 kilometers from Ierapetra.
