= Agia Fotia =

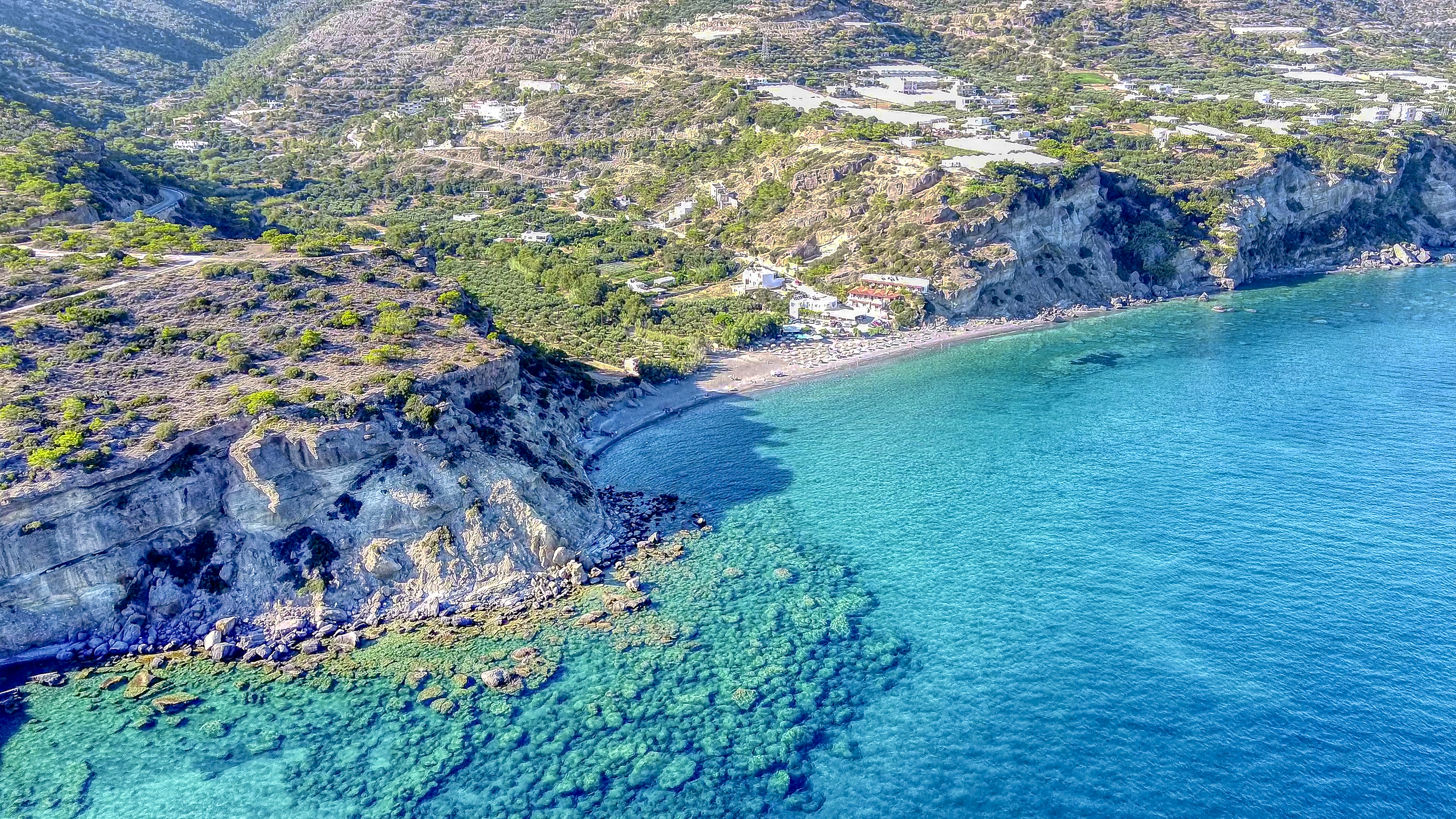
- Agia Fotia beach

- Location within Greece
- Coordinates: 35.026°N 25.875°E
- Country: Greece
- Region: Crete
- Regional unit: Lasithi

Agia Fotia is a settlement on Crete in the prefecture of Lasithi. It is situated ~14 km (8.7 mi) east of Ierapetra and is known for the Agia Fotia beach (also spelled as Aghia Fotia beach) and the Church of Agia Foteini.
