= Stomio, Lasithi =

Village in Greece

Coordinates: 35°00′45″N 25°39′48″E

Stomio is a village in the Cretan municipality of Ierapetra located 1.2 km west of Gra Lygia. Stomio's residents are called "Stomiotes".
