= Myrtos Beach (Myrtos) =

Beach in Crete, Greece

Coordinates: 35.0040°N 25.5840°E

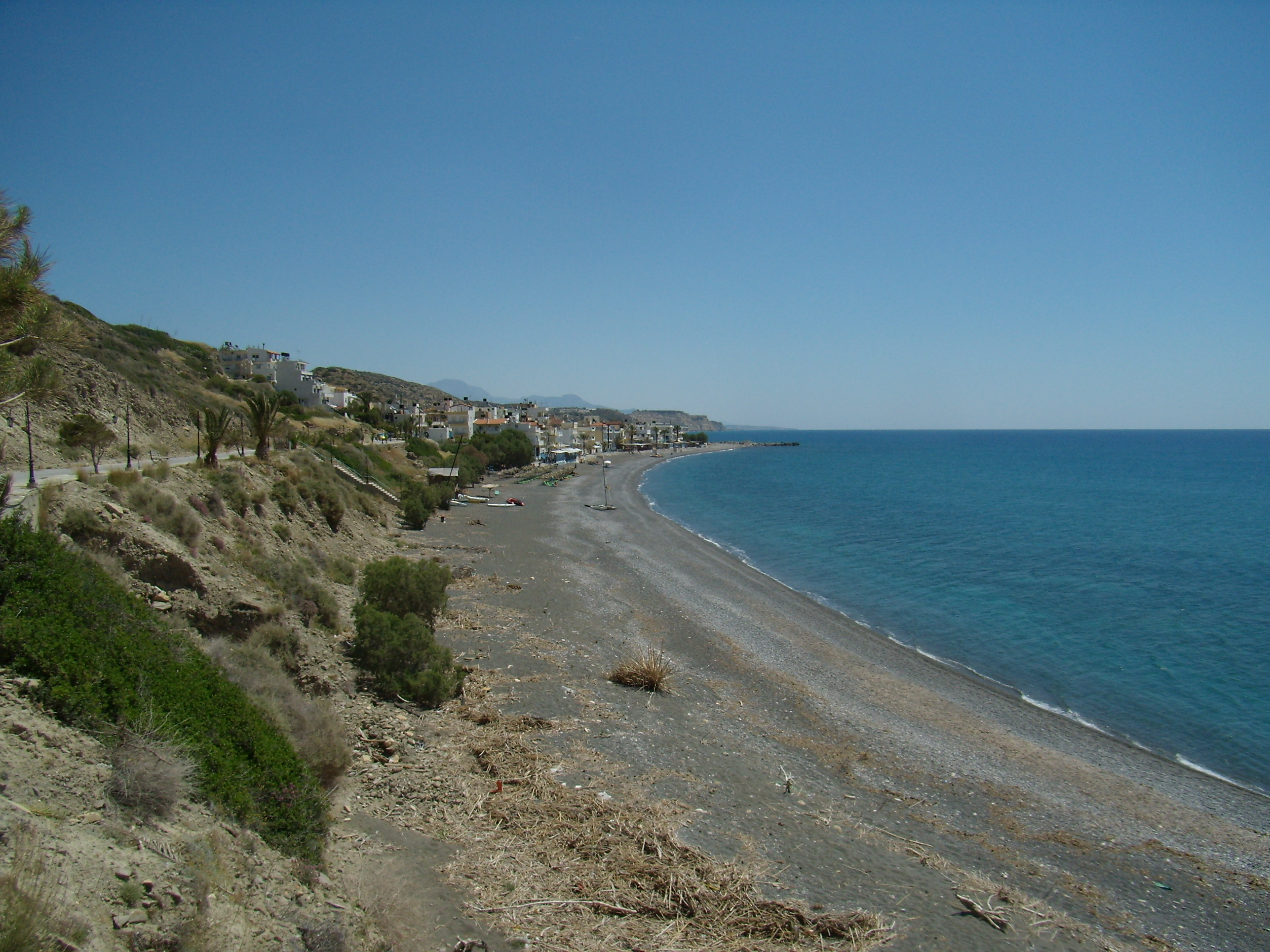
Myrtos Beach on 8 May 2011

Myrtos is a small village located about 15 km west of Ierapetra in Crete. The main beach at Myrtos has gray pebbles, crystal clear waters and is sheltered from the wind.

Myrtos beach is in front of taverns and restaurants. It is fully organized with umbrellas, showers, changing rooms, lifeguards, as well as an organized space for water sports such as beach volley. There is also sailing school.

Moving west from the main beach, there is an appropriate place for camping, while to the east there is a beach with big pebbles and trees that offer shade to bathers.
