= Havgas Gorge =

- Interactive map of Havgas Gorge

The Havgas Gorge is the canal that drains water from the Katharo Plateau to the Lasithi Plateau. The winter and rainy season makes the approach difficult and dangerous in the canyon.

Generally the canyon is passable and impressive. In Neraidokolympos (a large swimming area) there is a large round block, which has fallen to the bottom of the gorge and diverted the water's flow. From that point on, the canyon becomes inaccessible, and only experienced climbers can continue the route.
