= Gdochia =

Gdochia Γδόχια
- Community
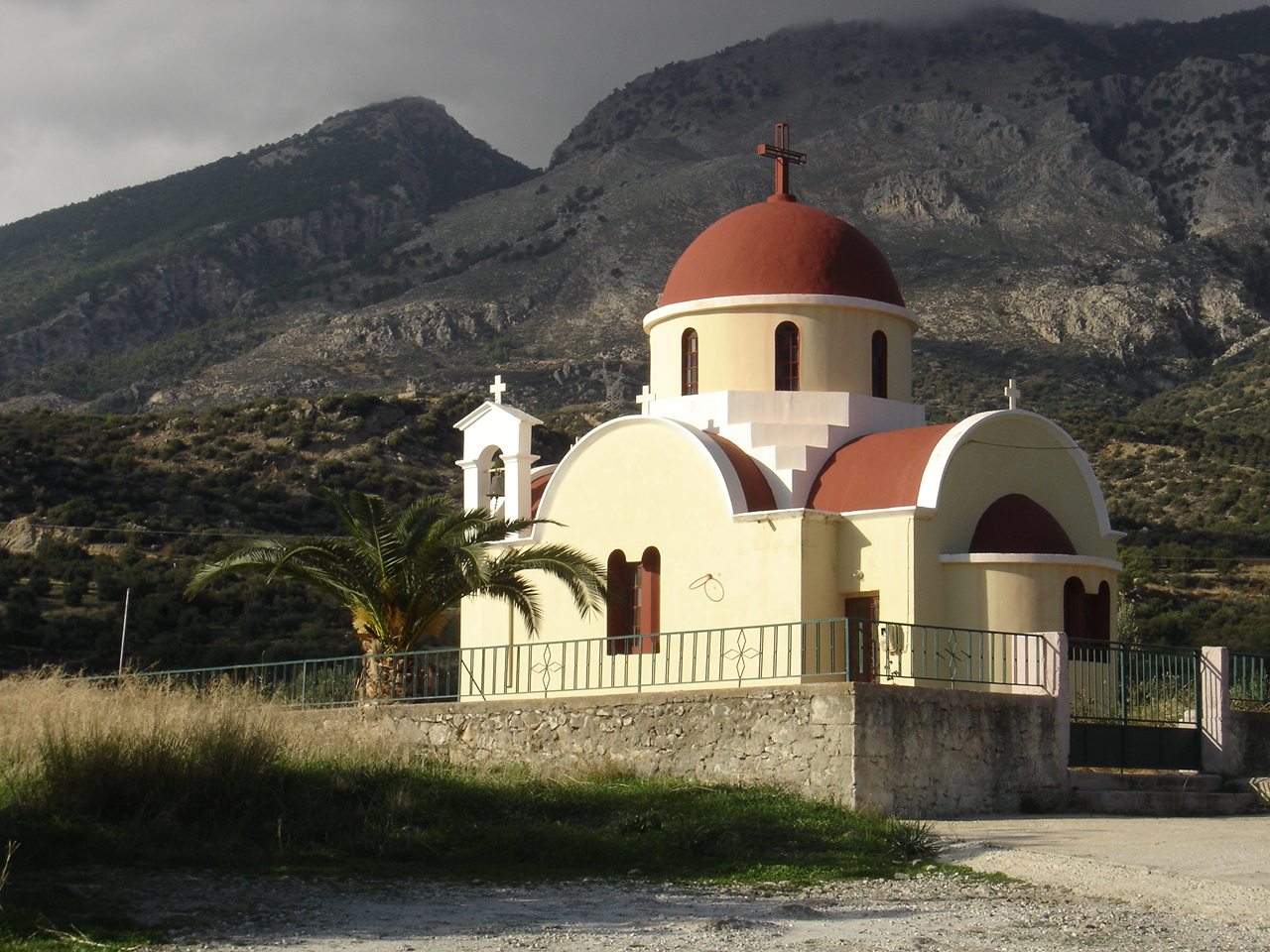
- Church of Saint George in Gdochia

- Location within Greece
- Coordinates: 35°1′4″N 25°33′21″E
- Country: Greece
- Administrative region: Crete
- Regional unit: Lasithi
- Municipality: Ierapetra
- Municipal unit: Ierapetra

Population (2021)
  - Community: 30
- Time zone: UTC+2 (EET)
  - Summer (DST): UTC+3 (EEST)

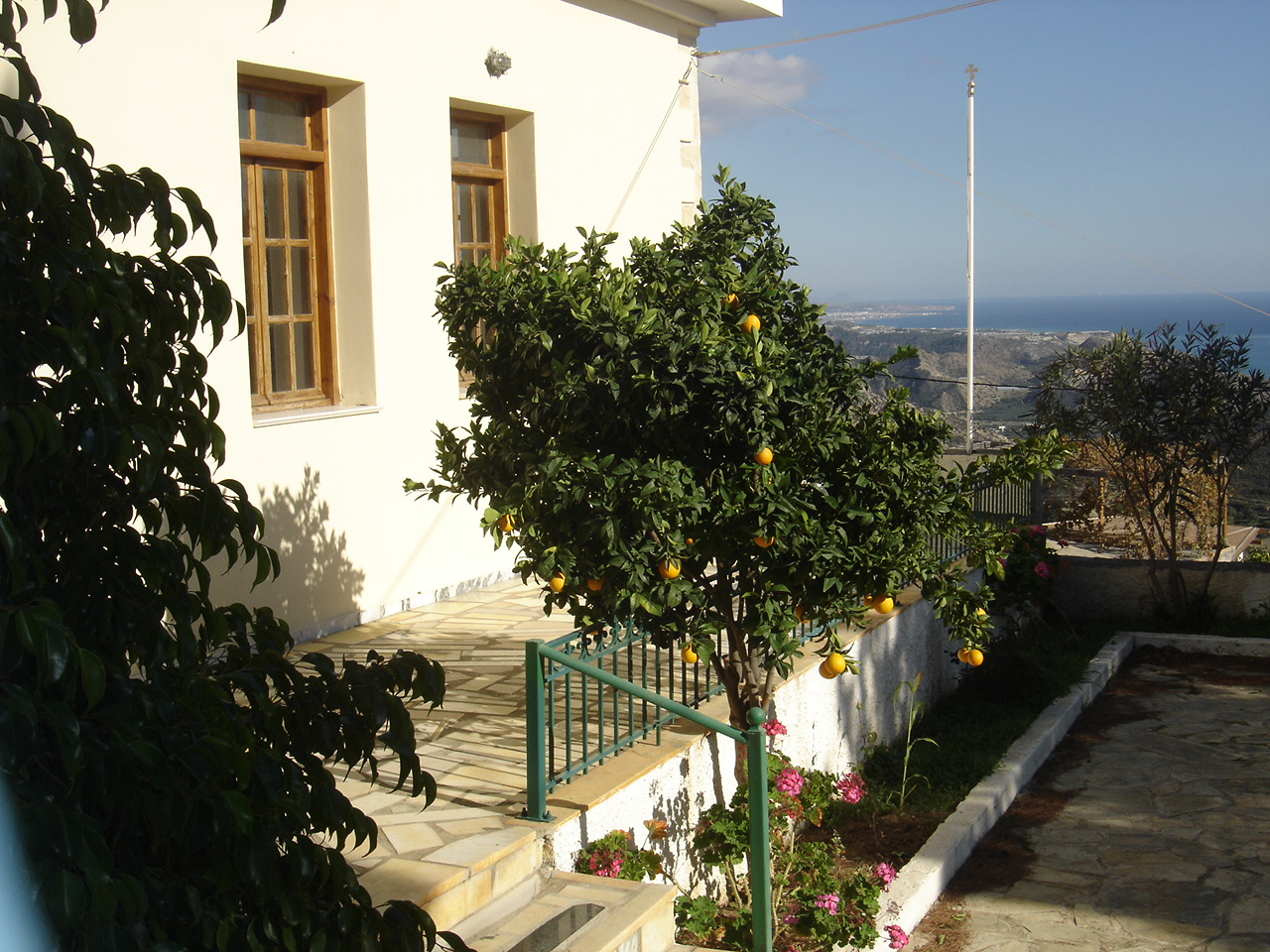
Orange tree in Gdochia

Gdochia (Greek: Γδόχια) is a village on Crete 20 kilometers west of Ierapetra built in an area with views of Ierapetra town and the sea. It is said to receive his name from an ancient word that means "it has rain". In September 1943, over 40 residents of Gdochia were brutally executed by the Nazis.
