= Exo Lakkonia =

Village in Crete, Greece

Exo Lakkonia Έξω Λακκώνια
- Community
- Location within Greece
- Coordinates: 35°12′N 25°39′E
- Country: Greece
- Administrative region: Crete
- Regional unit: Lasithi
- Municipality: Agios Nikolaos
- Municipal unit: Agios Nikolaos

Population (2021)
  - Community: 254
- Time zone: UTC+2 (EET)
  - Summer (DST): UTC+3 (EEST)

Exo Lakkonia (Greek: Έξω Λακκώνια) is a traditional village with small population near Agios Nikolaos of Crete. It has a folklore museum and some traditional coffee shops and an old church of St. George. It is located in a plain between the Oropedio Lasithiou and the area of Agios Nikolaos. A lot of European people have invested in the property in the area. It is also famous for a spring of water coming from the Lasithi mountain. It's also the birthplace of the famous singer Giannis Haroulis
