= Kalamaki beach (Crete) =

Beach in Crete, Greece

Kalamaki beach, known as Kapelas, is located 6 km west of Ierapetra, near Nea Anatoli in Crete.

It is a quiet beach with fine sand and shallow waters. The beach is a few known mainly to locals, because is hidden from the road by tall cliffs and greenhouses that exist around it.

Kalamaki is an attendance area for turtles Caretta caretta.
