= Kroustas =

Kroustas Κρούστας
- Community
- Location within Greece
- Coordinates: 35°08′21″N 25°39′35″E
- Country: Greece
- Administrative region: Crete
- Regional unit: Lasithi
- Municipality: Agios Nikolaos
- Municipal unit: Agios Nikolaos

Population (2021)
  - Community: 415
- Time zone: UTC+2 (EET)
  - Summer (DST): UTC+3 (EEST)

Kroustas is a village close to Agios Nikolaos on the island of Crete, Greece. It is located on a hill 520 m above the sea level. In the year 2021 the village had 415 inhabitants.

Kroustas is known for its views of Mirabello Bay. It is also known for its traditional cuisine including myzithropites (special cheese pies), ftazymo bread and aiga vrasti (boiled goat).

In the past people of Kroustas were shepherds and land workers. However, nowadays, following the growing tourist industry in east Crete, many of the village people work in the nearby resorts of Agios Nikolaos and Elounda.
