= Meseleroi =

Greek village

Meseleroi Μεσελέροι
- Community
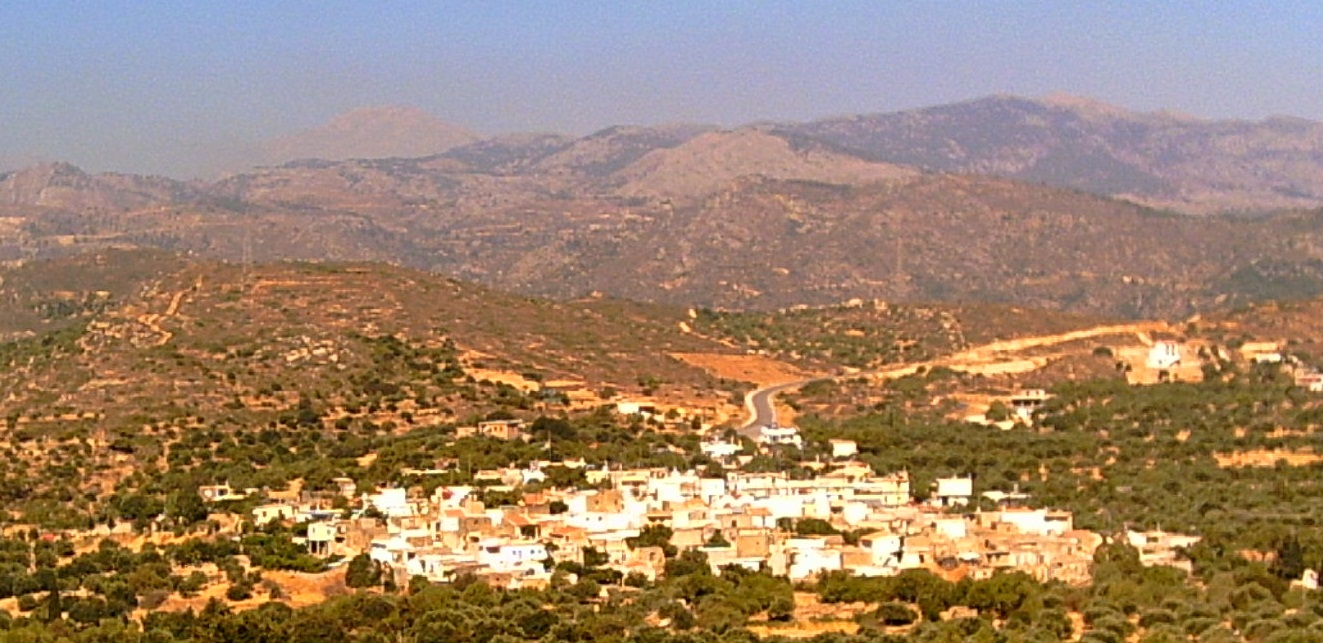

- Location within Greece
- Coordinates: 35°05′N 25°43′E
- Country: Greece
- Administrative region: Crete
- Regional unit: Lasithi
- Municipality: Ierapetra
- Municipal unit: Ierapetra

Population (2021)
  - Community: 127
- Time zone: UTC+2 (EET)
  - Summer (DST): UTC+3 (EEST)

Meseleroi (Greek: Μεσελέροι) is a village on the eastern part of the Greek island of Crete, in the regional unit of Lasithi. It is located 9 km north of Ierapetra, and lies within its administrative limits. The village is 360 meters above sea level.

Meseleroi is named after the ancient town Oleros, as it is located in the middle (in Greek: meson, meaning middle, + Oleros). A few ancient ruins in the area still survive to this day. The main sight of the village is the Monastery of Panagia Vryomeni, which attracts many visitors during the Orthodox Feast of the Dormition (Falling Asleep) of the Theotokos on 15 August.

The natural environment of Meseleroi suffered greatly during the wildfire that took place on 17 August 1994, which destroyed most of the pineforest that encircled the village. However, right after the fire, there were attempts to reforestate the destroyed part and restore as much of the natural beauty as possible.
