= Selakano =

- Location within Crete Location within Greece
- Coordinates: 35°05′32.29″N 25°32′33.46″E

Selakano (Greek: Σελάκανο) is a forested valley and a hamlet in the municipality of Ierapetra on the island of Crete. Selakano forms one of the most important ecosystems on Crete. The forest core of wild pine is also important on the Mediterranean level. It is located in the northwestern territories of Ierapetra in the southeastern part of the Dikti massif, surrounded by the four highest peaks (Lazaros 2085 m, Spathi 2148 m, Afendis Christos 2141 m, Psari Madara 2090 m). In the east, there is a panoramic view of the Libyan Sea, at a distance of 15 km.

In the forest Pinus brutia is a prevalent drought-tolerant species that can withstand six-month droughts and grow in various rocks and soils. There are also kermes oaks (Quercus coccifera), planes (Platanus orientalis), Cretan maples (Acer sempervirens), cypresses (Cupressus sempervirens) and several other plant species. In the basin, where the settlements of Selakano and Mathokastana are located, there are many walnut and pear trees, vineyards and, patches of fields where vegetables are cultivated.

The forest is the nesting and hunting ground of many predatory birds like the hawk. It is the most productive apiculture spot in Crete, while in the past wood and resin were harvested.
