= Pacheia Ammos =

Pacheia Ammos Παχειά Άμμος
- Community
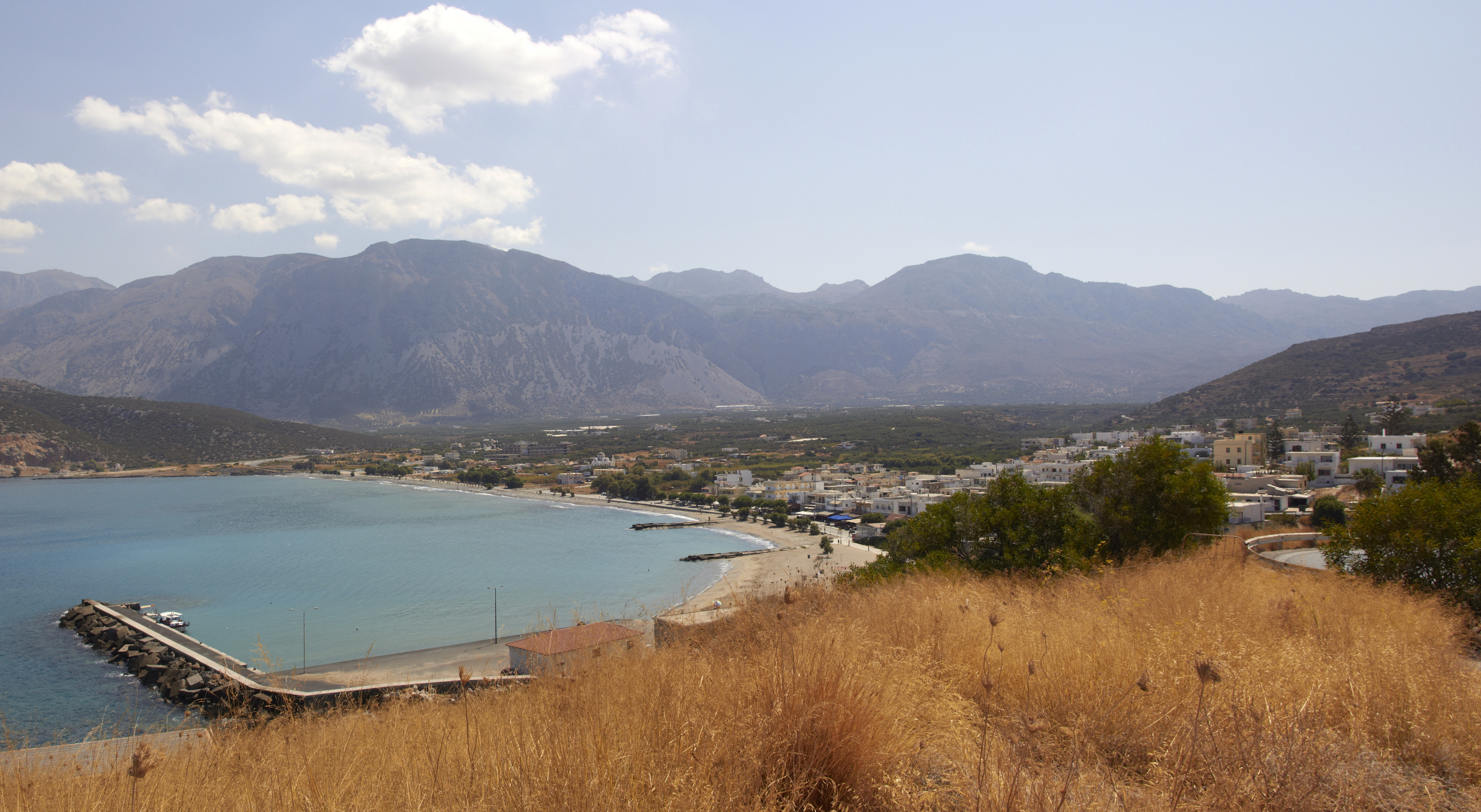

- Location within Greece
- Coordinates: 35°06′32″N 25°48′18″E
- Country: Greece
- Administrative region: Crete
- Regional unit: Lasithi
- Municipality: Ierapetra
- Municipal unit: Ierapetra

Population (2021)
  - Community: 827
- Time zone: UTC+2 (EET)
  - Summer (DST): UTC+3 (EEST)

Pacheia Ammos (Greek: Παχειά Άμμος, also Pachiá Ámmos) is a village in the municipality of Ierapetra on the island of Crete in Greece. It is located on the north coast of the island, 15 km to the north of the city of Ierapetra, at the fork in the road that leads to Heraklion in the west and Sitia in the east.

== Attractions ==
- The Minoan settlement of Gournia
- The Minoan settlement of Vasiliki
- The church of Agios Nikolaos
- The church of Agios Analipsi
- The INSTAP study center
