= Anatoli, Lasithi =

Village in Crete, Greece

Anatoli Ανατολή
- Community
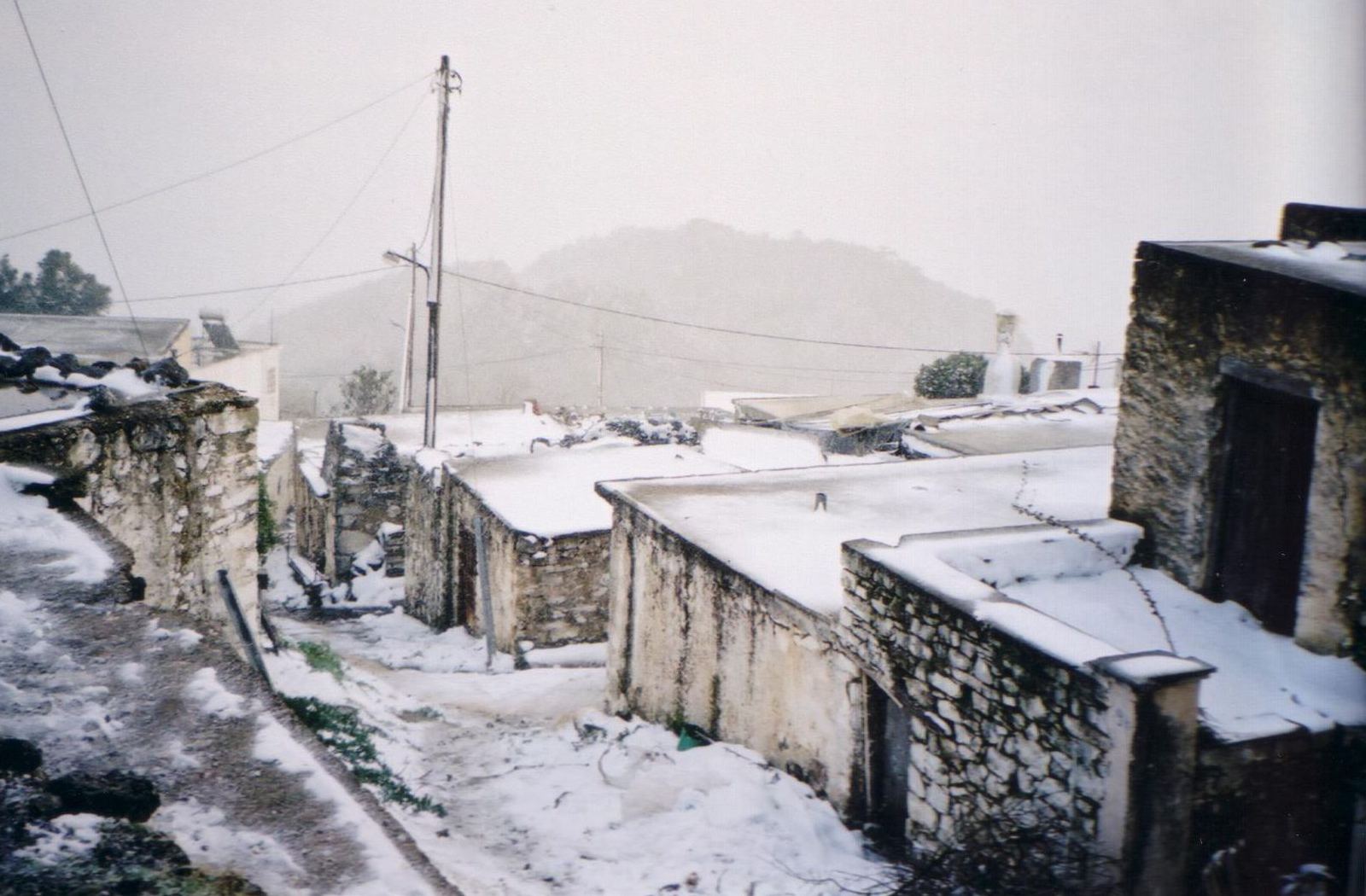
- Anatoli during a harsh winter

- Location within Greece
- Coordinates: 35°02′42″N 25°38′31″E
- Country: Greece
- Administrative region: Crete
- Regional unit: Lasithi
- Municipality: Ierapetra
- Municipal unit: Ierapetra

Population (2021)
  - Community: 1,584
- Time zone: UTC+2 (EET)
  - Summer (DST): UTC+3 (EEST)

Anatoli is a village in the Ierapetra municipality of the prefecture of Lasithi in eastern Crete. It is built 600 meters above sea level and the view over Ierapetra to the sea with Chrysi island opposite, is unique. It is called the "Libyan sea balcony". Despite the destruction of the surrounding wooded area, due to fire in recent years, the whole landscape is fantastic.
