= Episkopi, Lasithi =

Village in Crete, Greece

Coordinates: 35.057°N 25.794°E

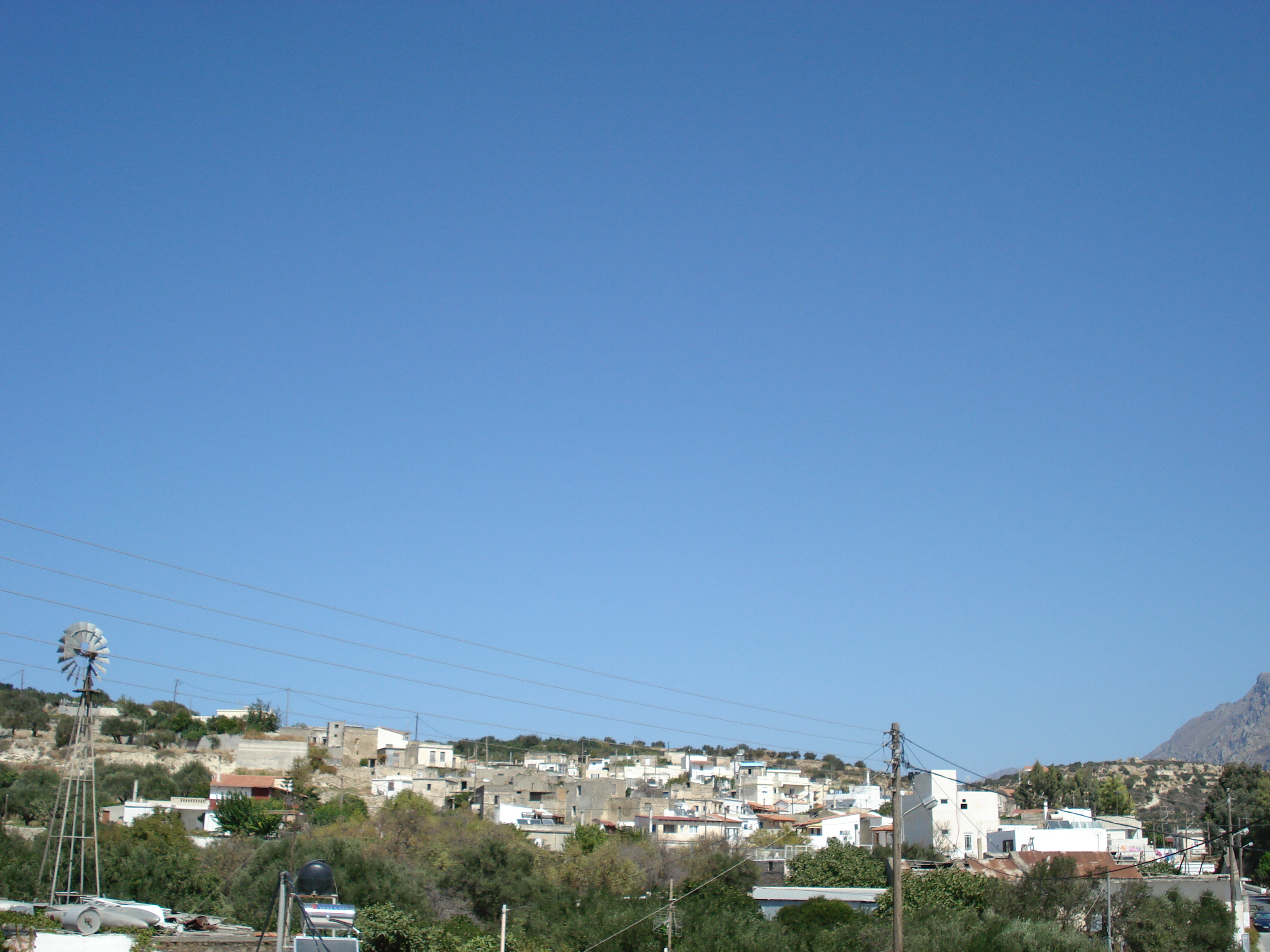
Episkopi

Episkopi is a village on the Greek island of Crete. Episkopi belongs to the community of Kato Chorio within the municipality of Ierapetra, Lasithi. It lies north of Ierapetra in the middle of the narrowest part of the island. The village has approximately one thousand inhabitants.

The village was established during the Minoan period, probably between 2500 and 2000 BCE. It is located 6.5 km north of Ierapetra on the road from Agios Nikolaos to Ierapetra at 120 m a.s.l. The municipality covers an area of 36 km², while 15 km² are cultivated with olive trees, most of them irrigated from the Bramianos dam, and the springs of Malavra, Thripti, Kefalovrissi and Kato Horio. Like their Minoan predecessors the present residents are employed mostly in agriculture, in the harvest of olives and the production of olive oil.

The village's main attraction is a former Byzantine bathhouse church which was converted into a church in the 13th century. It has recently been restored. The church is dedicated to Agios Georgios (Saint George) and Agios Charalambos. Close to this church the remains of an Early Byzantine church can be found.

At 1946 A.C. a sarcophagus was found in the village from the Minoan period.

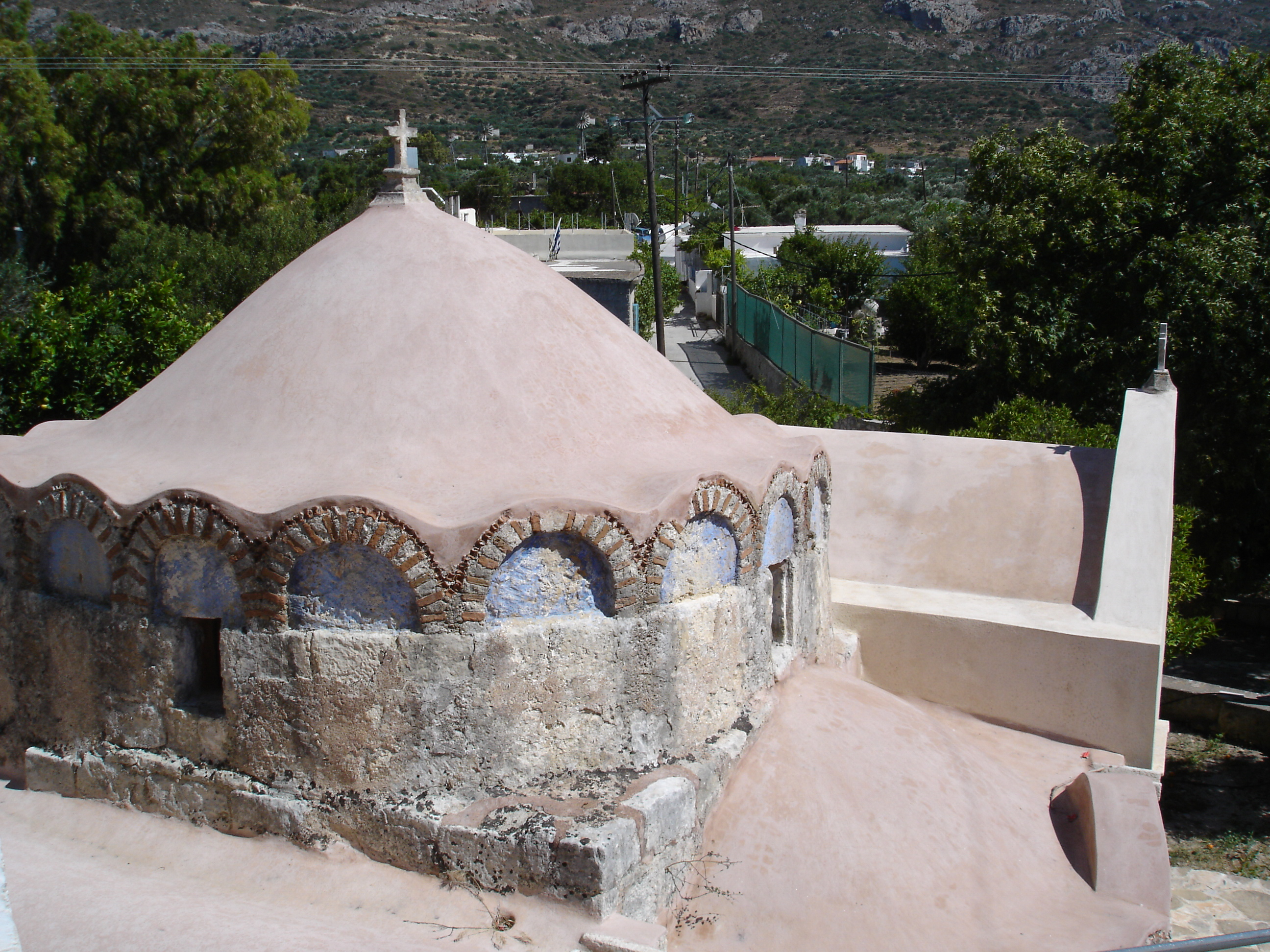
A.Georgios

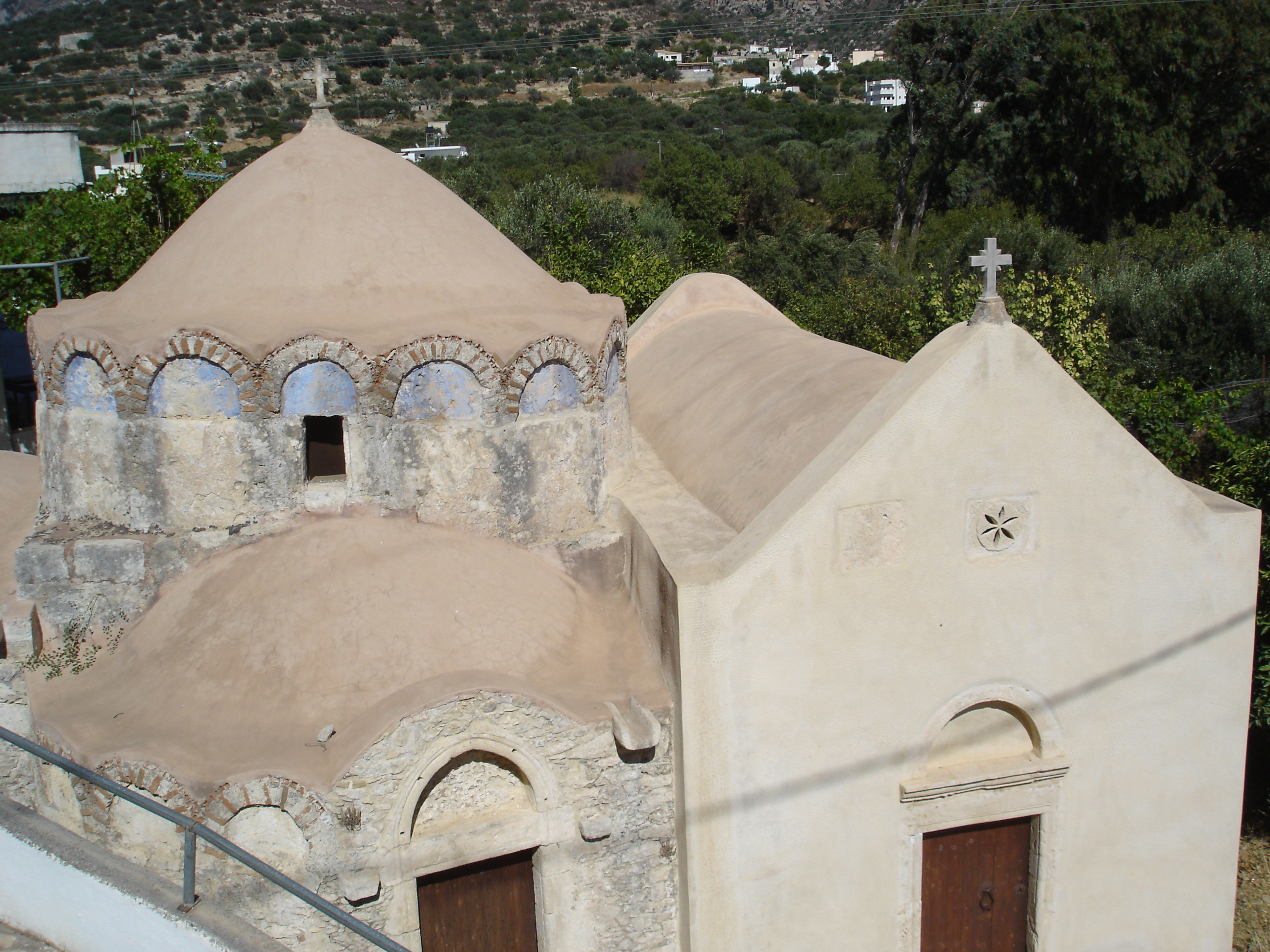
