= Gra Lygia =

Village in Greece

Coordinates: 35°00′54″N 25°41′32″E

Gra Lygia (Greek: Γρα Λυγιά) is located approximately 4 km west of Ierapetra center. Its residents are called "GraLighiotes". They are occupied mainly in the agriculture sector; this is the main source of income for the residents and their income per capita is one of the highest in the region. The village is surrounded by greenhouses which demonstrates that the agriculture sector is modernized. There are many firms in related fields such as agriculture companies that co-operate with multinationals.

In recent years there has been a lot of development in the village's standard of living. Young people can enjoy the presence of cafeterias, internet cafes, snack bars, kebab shops, and DVD rentals. Major shops are Linux cafe (internet cafe), gyrovolies (kebab shop), Joanna (clothwear), Avantage (cafe bar) and others. There are two relatively big supermarkets and several corner shops that give a good shopping and leisure environment to the community.

The community enjoys high multicultural environment as a lot of immigrants live here and contribute to the local economy mainly as manual workers. The immigrants are mainly for countries of the former Communist bloc. The majority of them comes from Bulgaria and Albania, but also from countries such as Poland, Russia etc.

Sports are highly popular in the village, especially football and basketball. The basketball team of Lygia won the double in the local championship of the Cretan League and got promoted in the Third National Division for the 2006-2007 season. There are some sports facilities such as a basketball and volleyball court in the elementary school and a small football stadium in the Kotsyfiani church area.

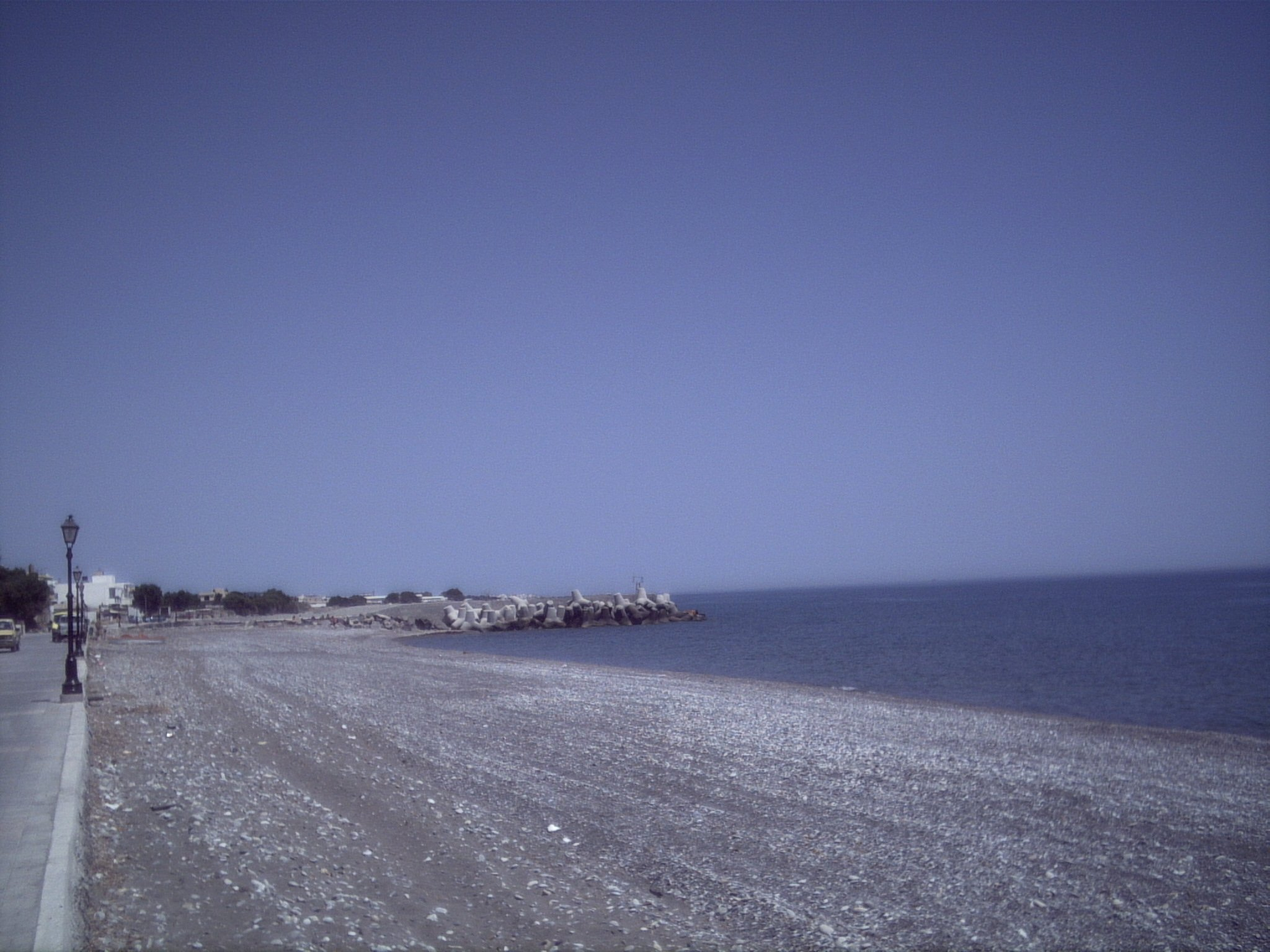
The beach of the village

The village is near the seaside looking over to the Libyan Sea and is a great place for swimming and summer sports. Each summer some tournaments such as beach football are organised at the local beach. During the summer the beach is very popular as a lot of people with origins from Gra-Lighia spend their holidays in the village. Local people enjoy sailing and fishing and they possess small boats that one can see in the marina of the village.

A big problem for this community is the dangerous road network that surround the village and lead to deadly accidents especially among youth that use motorbikes.

Notable persons with origins from Gra Lighia are Ioannis Pyrgiotakis who is ex vice-chancellor of the University of Crete and Ioannis (Marinos) Gaitanakis (mother side) one of the top basketball player (shooting guard) that ever appeared in Ierapetra. He has the record for most points per game(55)
