= Ierapetra =

City in Crete, Greece

Ierapetra Ιεράπετρα
- Municipality
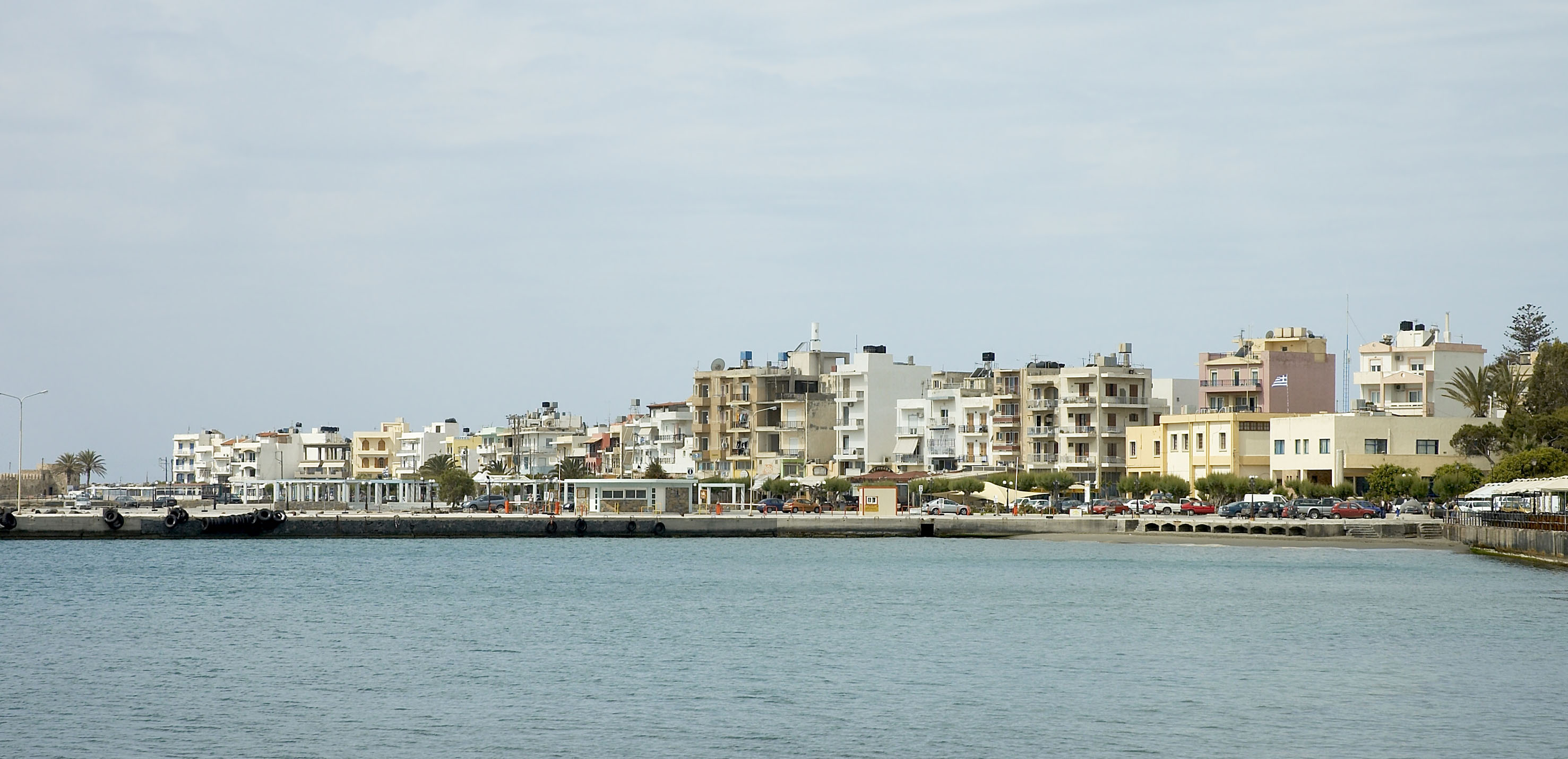
- View of the port of Ierapetra

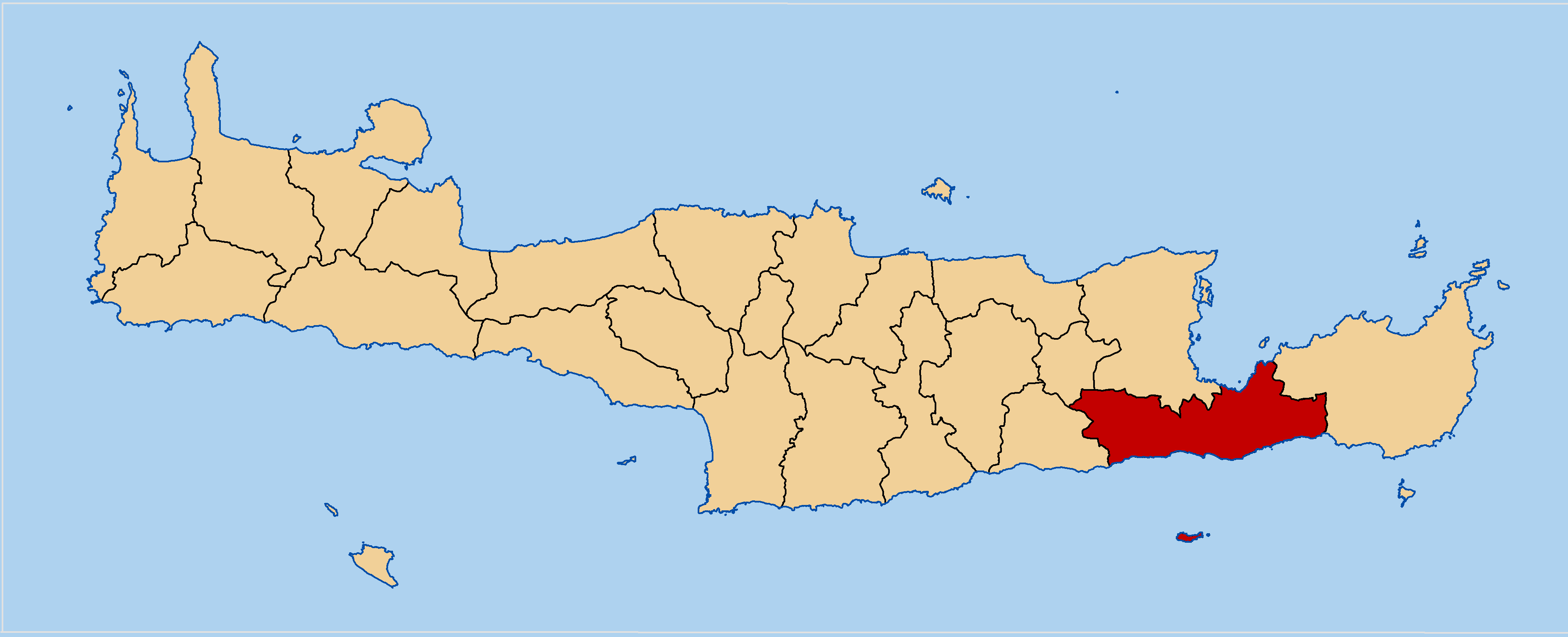

- Location within Greece
- Coordinates: 35°00′42″N 25°44′29″E
- Country: Greece
- Administrative region: Crete
- Regional unit: Lasithi

Government
  - Mayor: Emmanouil Fragkoulis (since 2023)

Area
  - Municipality: 470.2 km^{2} (181.5 sq mi)
  - Municipal unit: 394.8 km^{2} (152.4 sq mi)
- Elevation: 18 m (59 ft)

Population (2021)
  - Municipality: 27,338
  - Density: 58.14/km^{2} (150.6/sq mi)
  - Municipal unit: 24,749
  - Municipal unit density: 62.69/km^{2} (162.4/sq mi)
  - Community: 17,710
- Time zone: UTC+2 (EET)
  - Summer (DST): UTC+3 (EEST)
- Postal code: 72x xx
- Area code: 284x0
- Vehicle registration: AN
- Website: www.ierapetra.gr

Ierapetra (Greek: Ιεράπετρα, lit. 'sacred stone'; ancient name: Ἱεράπυτνα Hierápytna) is a Greek city and municipality located on the southeast coast of Crete. It is the fourth largest city on the island and the largest in the Lasithi regional unit, serving as Greece's main port in the Libyan Sea.

== History ==
The town of Ierapetra (in the local dialect: Γεράπετρο Gerapetro) is located on the southeast coast of Crete, situated on the beach of Ierapetra Bay. This town lies south of Agios Nikolaos and southwest of Sitia, and is an important regional centre. With 17,710 inhabitants (in 2021), Ierapetra is the most populous town in the regional unit of Lasithi and the fourth most populous town in Crete. Ierapetra is nicknamed "the bride of the Libyan Sea" because of its position as the only town on Crete's southern coast.

=== Antiquity ===
Ierapetra has retained a prominent place in the history of Crete since the Minoan period. The Greek and later Roman town of Hierapytna was located on the same site as present-day Ierapetra.

In the Classical Age, Hierapytna became the most substantial Dorian city in eastern Crete and was in a continual rivalry with Praisos, the last Minoan city on the island.

In the 3rd century BC, Hierapytna was notorious for piracy and took part in the Cretan War with other Cretan cities, siding with Philip V of Macedon against Knossos and Rhodes.

The city of Gortyn surpassed Hierapytna's importance as an independent state when Hierapytna was conquered by the Romans in 67 BC (the last free city in Crete). The Roman conquest of Hierapytna coincided with that of Knossos, Cydonia, and Lato. Today, the remains of the Roman harbour can still be seen in the shallow bay.

=== Medieval era ===
In AD 824, Arab invaders destroyed the city and rebuilt it as a base for pirates.

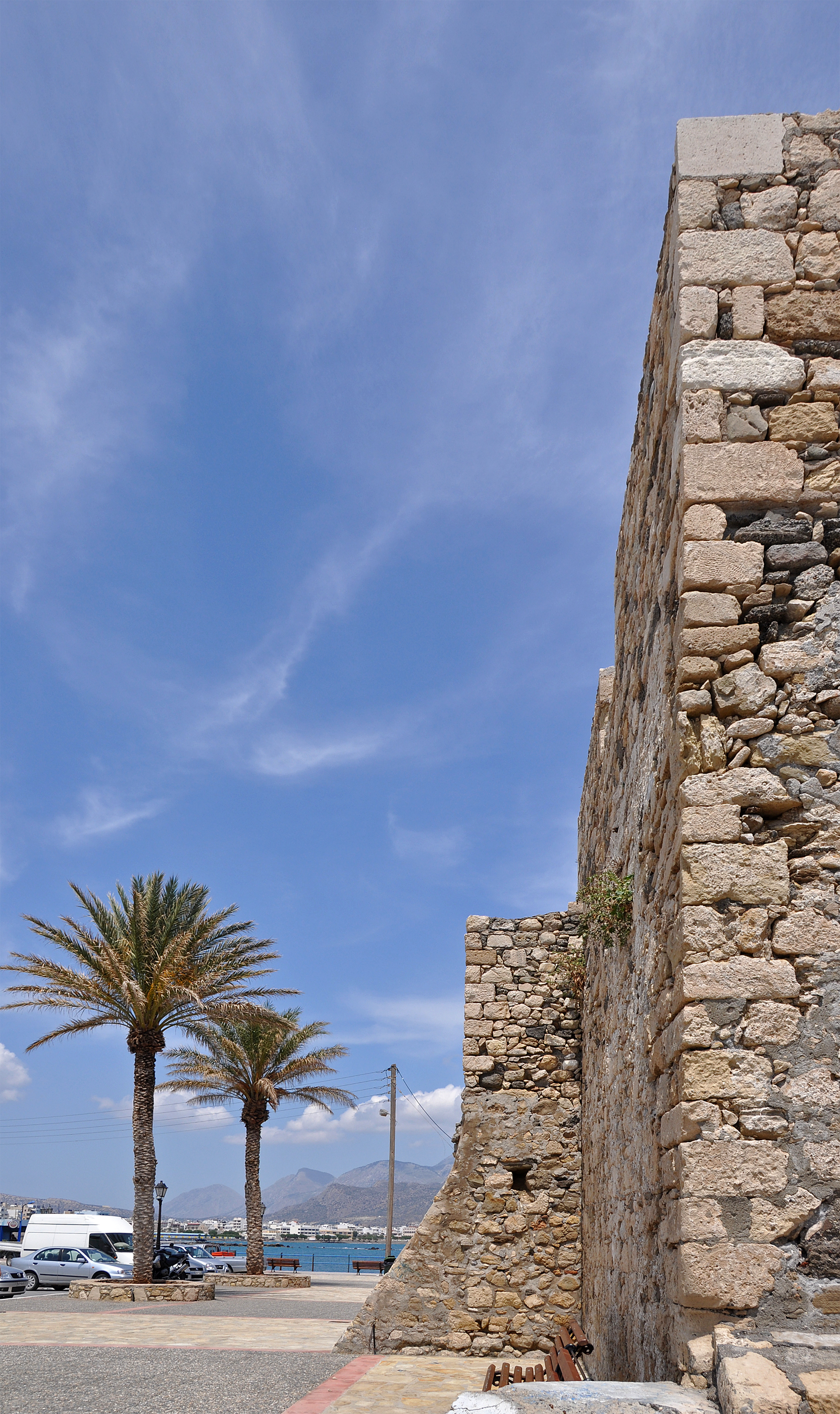
View of the old Venetian fortress.

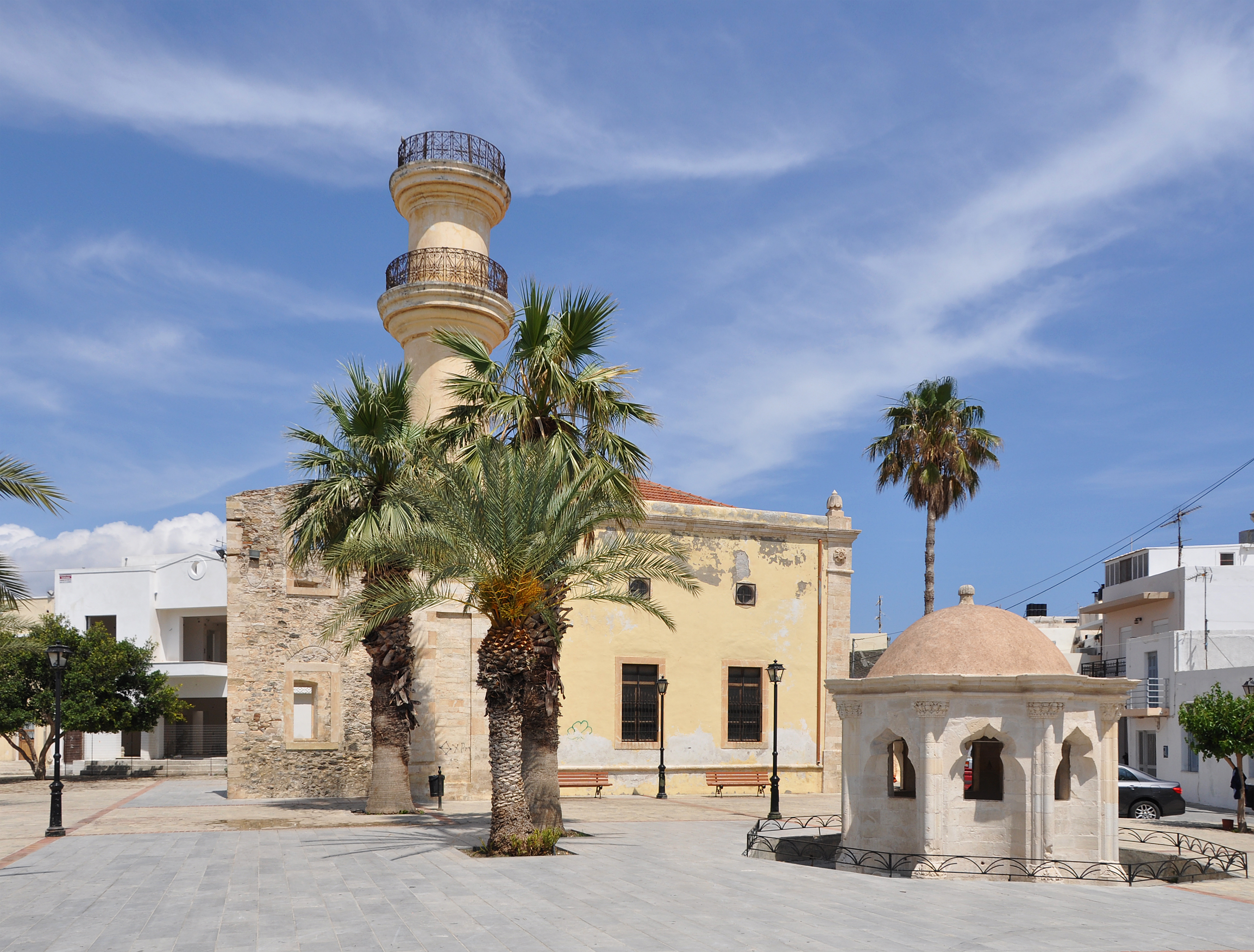
Old Ottoman mosque.

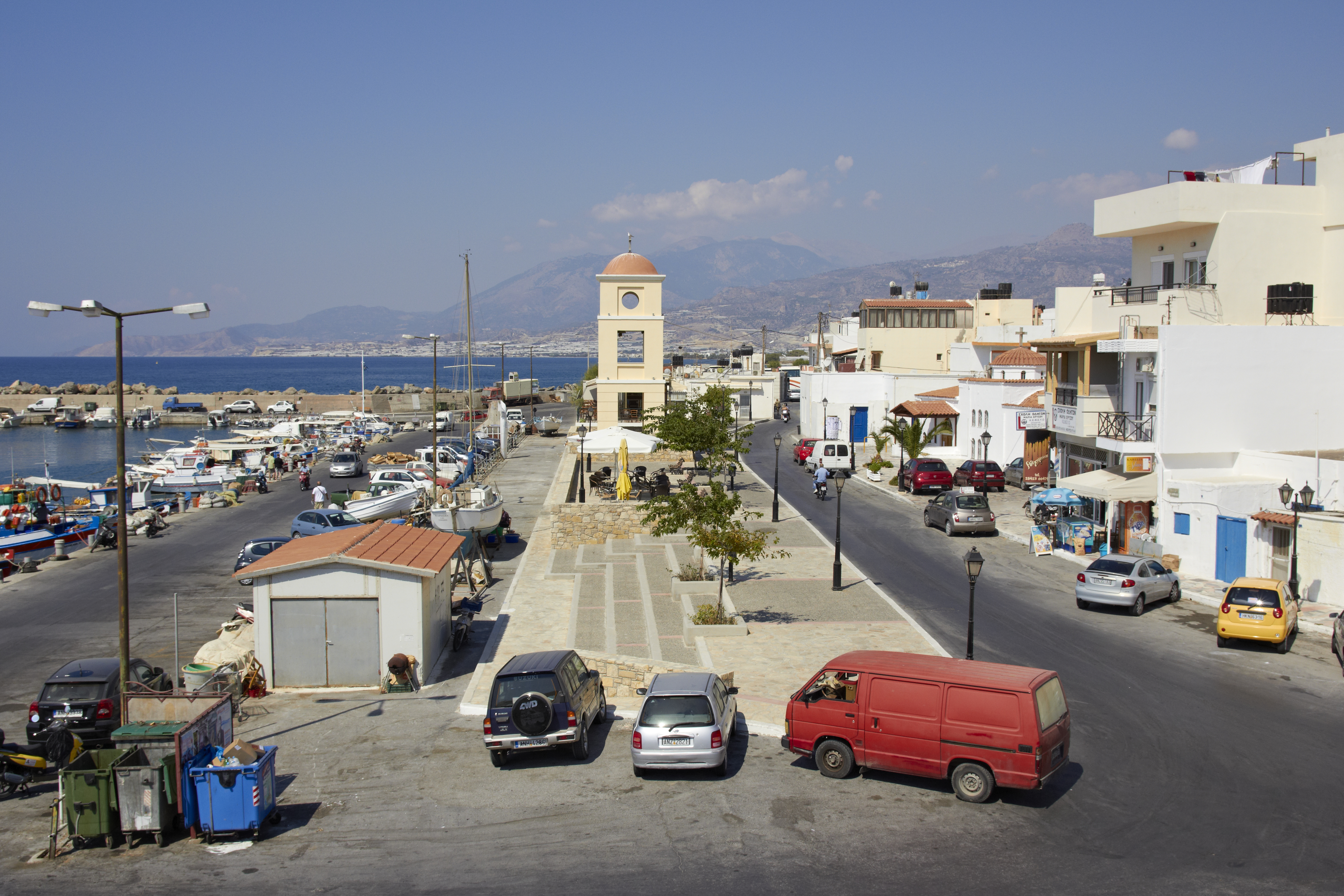
View of Ierapetra

From the 13th to the 17th centuries, Ierapetra, now known by its present name, became prosperous under the influence of Venice. The Fortress of Kales, built in the early years of Venetian rule and strengthened by Francesco Morosini in 1626 to protect the harbor, is a remnant of this period. Local myth, however, states the Genoese pirate Pescatore built the fortress in 1212. In July 1798, Ierapetra made a small step into world history; Napoleon stayed with a local family after the Battle of the Pyramids in Egypt. The house he occupied still exists.

=== Modern era ===
During the Ottoman period, a mosque was built in Ierapetra.

Finds from Ierapetra's past can be found in the local Museum of Antiquities, formerly a school for Muslim children. The exhibition's centerpiece is a well-preserved statue of Persephone.

Present-day Ierapetra consists of two distinct areas, Kato Mera and Pano Mera. Kato Mera is the old town section located on the southwestern headland. It is characterised by a medieval street layout with narrow alleyways, cul-de-sacs, and small houses, which create a village-like atmosphere. The former mosque and the "house of Napoleon" can be found in this neighborhood, as well as the Aghios Georgios metropolitan church, built in the town center in 1856. Aghios Georgios is considered one of the most innovative churches in Crete. The church's ceiling contains many "blind" domes. These domes and the central dome are constructed mainly from cedarwood. Pano Mera is a much larger new town section, containing wider streets and three to four-story houses. Pano Mera is still expanding towards the west, north, and east.

Ierapetra's principal shopping street is Koundouriotou. In the central section of Pano Mera, there is a town hall, a museum, a cinema, and a hospital. To the west is the southern headland containing the fortress, a port for fishing boats, and the 'Navmachia' area, where sea fights among slaves for citizens' entertainment occurred during the Roman occupation. Further east is a short beach with bars and restaurants, followed by the quay for ferries to Chrissi. Further on lies the main boulevard, which contains hotels, bars, restaurants, and souvenir shops. At its end, a promenade runs parallel to Ierapetra Bay's long beach.

The local government has planned the development of a new international port. This plan is being opposed by some citizens who think it will destroy the local environment and scenery. They are supported by Ecocrete.gr, a local environmental tribune.

== Infrastructure ==
=== Education ===
In 2003, the Technological Educational Institute (TEI) of Marketing and Commerce was opened in Ierapetra. In the wake of the Greek financial crisis, in early 2013, the government had to decide whether to merge or close several schools (in a plan named "Athena" after the Greek goddess of wisdom), including TEI of Marketing in Ierapetra, sparking protests. Around 7,000 people staged a peaceful protest on 8 February 2013 holding candles and torches. Local authorities and local media described the march as "the biggest rally in Ierapetra to date." On 12 February 2013, the town of Ierapetra witnessed a big protest rally, as thousands of people took to the streets once again, demanding the TEI school to stay in town and the hospital to be upgraded.

=== Health ===
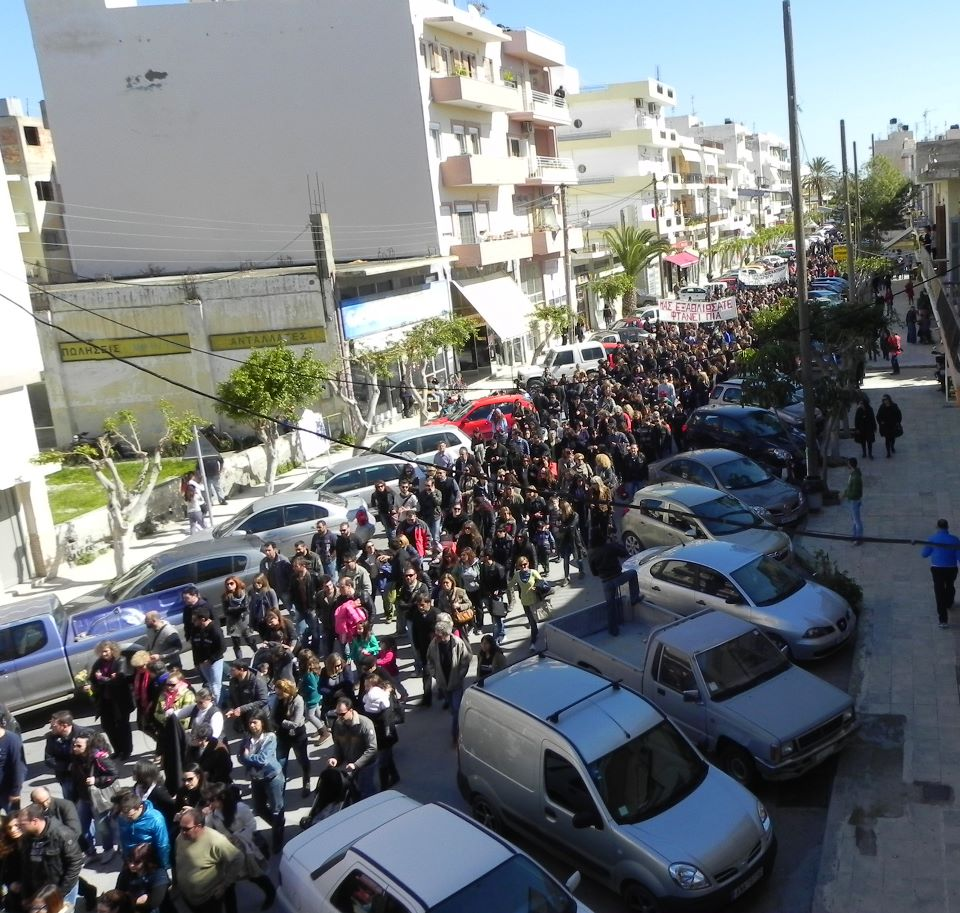
People in Ierapetra staging a protest rally for the hospital and the technical school of the city.

The General Hospital of Ierapetra was set up in 1955 with funds from Cretans who lived in the USA. In 2010, it was announced that, under a government plan for new administrative divisions called "the Kallikratis Project", the hospital was to be shut down. This sparked an unprecedented wave of protests within the region, as the hospital serves 40,000 people including some from the neighboring prefecture of Agios Nikolaos. The protests culminated in a march that took place on 25 January 2011. Another march from Ierapetra to Iraklion followed on the same day, with over 2,500 people from and around the town taking part. Protests included occupying the building where the Decentralized Administration was located and an outdoor theatrical play performed by the protestors. Following those incidents, it was announced that the authorities had halted the plans to close the hospital, instead funding it with 1 million euros and promising to send more doctors.

However, despite the promises of the government, problems still existed surrounding the inadequate provision of health services and the lack of staff in the only hospital in the region. As a result, a fresh round of protests began on 26 May 2011 with a rally outside the seat of the municipality in Ierapetra. Around 1,000 people came to storm the town hall, protesting the latest additions to the building and demanding hospital upgrades instead. The protest, which is regarded a precedent for the region, lasted for 16 days. A row between the municipal authorities and the commission that advocated the upgrade of the hospital resulted in a stalemate and the prosecution of the people who led the storming of the town hall. The Head of the local church, Evgenios, mediated the negotiations and went to Athens along with the mayor and other officials. Negotiations eventually resulted in an agreement to upgrade the hospital. Following an order by the incumbent mayor, 14 citizens were put to trial for the town hall occupation and were found not guilty on 11 July 2011. It was the first such trial in the town to date. Another protest on 20 July 2011 featured a march from Ierapetra to Iraklion and yet another despite the rain in Heraklion on 29 February 2012.

According to inspectors, the hospital was rated "as an example for other hospitals in regional Greece". However, it was merged by the government only two months before the June 2012 Greek legislative elections. Over the next few months, the merger caused yet more problems concerning bureaucracy, inadequate food and supplies, and a lack of qualified medical professionals. On 30 January 2013, people staged another protest outside the hospital of Ierapetra. The hospital was at the center of a new rally in Ierapetra which took place on 12 February 2013 and another spreading throughout the prefecture of Lasithi. As a result, on 20 February 2013, thousands of people from Lasithi marched to Selinari, Lasithi, and Iraklion. Following the march, Cretans from Lasithi demanded access to health services, equal to the rest of Crete, and stormed the Regional Health headquarters in Iraklion. The unrest ended on 22 February 2013 following an agreement with officials that TEI schools, hospitals, and facilities would stay in the region.

The situation relapsed in early 2014 and a new rally was held on 7 May 2014. People from Ierapetra went to Heraklion, where they met with Antonios Grigorakis, the Head of the Prefecture in charge of Health, who committed to installing a permanent pathologist in the General Hospital (coming from another hospital in the Prefecture of Lasithi). Three people were injured before the meeting following clashes with the police.

== Demographics ==
The municipality of Ierapetra was formed under the 2011 local government reform through the merger of 2 former municipalities Makry Gialos and Ierapetra, which became municipal units. The new municipality of Ierapetra has an area of 470.15 km^{2} (181.53 sq mi).

The municipal unit of Ierapetra has an area of 394.774 km^{2} (152.423 sq mi). The municipal unit has a population of 24,749 (2021) and consists of the town of Ierapetra (population 17,710 in 2021), several villages, and the island of Chrissi. These settlements include:

- Agia Fotia
- Agios Ioannis
- Anatoli
- Amoudares
- Ano Simi
- Christos
- Drakalevri
- Episkopi
- Ferma
- Gdochia
- Gra Lygia
- Kaimenos
- Kalamafka
- Kalogeri
- Kamara
- Kato Chorio
- Kavousi
- Kentri
- Koutsounari
- Males
- Mathokotsana
- Melises
- Meseleri
- Monastiraki
- Minos
- Mythi
- Mournies
- Myrtos
- Nea Anatoli
- Nea Myrtos
- Pachia Ammos
- Panagia
- Pano Chorio
- Psathi, Riza
- Selakano
- Stavros
- Stomio
- Sykia
- Thrypti
- Vainia
- Vasiliki
- Vatos
- Xerambela
- Xerokambos

The municipal unit of Makry Gialos was established as a municipality in 1998. Since November 2011, when it lost four communities to the municipality of Siteia, it had an area of 75.376 square kilometres (29.103 sq mi) and a population of 2,589 (2021). It consists of the communities:

- Schinokapsala with the settlements of Achlia, Galini, and Mavros Kolimbos
- Oreino with the settlements of Agios Panteleimon, Andrianos and Kalyvitis
- Stavrochori with the settlements of Koutsouras, Lapithos and Tsikalaria
- Agios Stefanos with the settlement of Makry Gialos

== Ierapetra as a Province ==
The province of Ierapetra (Greek: Επαρχία Ιεράπετρας) was one of the provinces of Lasithi. Its territory corresponded partially with that of the current municipality of Ierapetra. It was abolished in 2006.

== Economy ==
The area's main economic activities are agriculture in the winter and tourism in the summer. Agricultural production in the area can be divided into two main parts. Whereas olive oil has been produced throughout the municipality since Minoan times at the latest, for the last thirty years large quantities of fruit and vegetables have also been exported. These are grown in plastic greenhouses, which cover an area of 15 square kilometers between the town of Ierapetra and Neos Myrtos. They also exist in Psari Forada in the western part, as well as, to a lesser degree, between the town and Goudouras in the eastern part of the municipality. The greenhouses were introduced by the Dutchman Paul Kuypers. The inhabitants of Ierapetra used to be on average among the richest on Crete due to their greenhouse exports.

== Notable Landforms ==
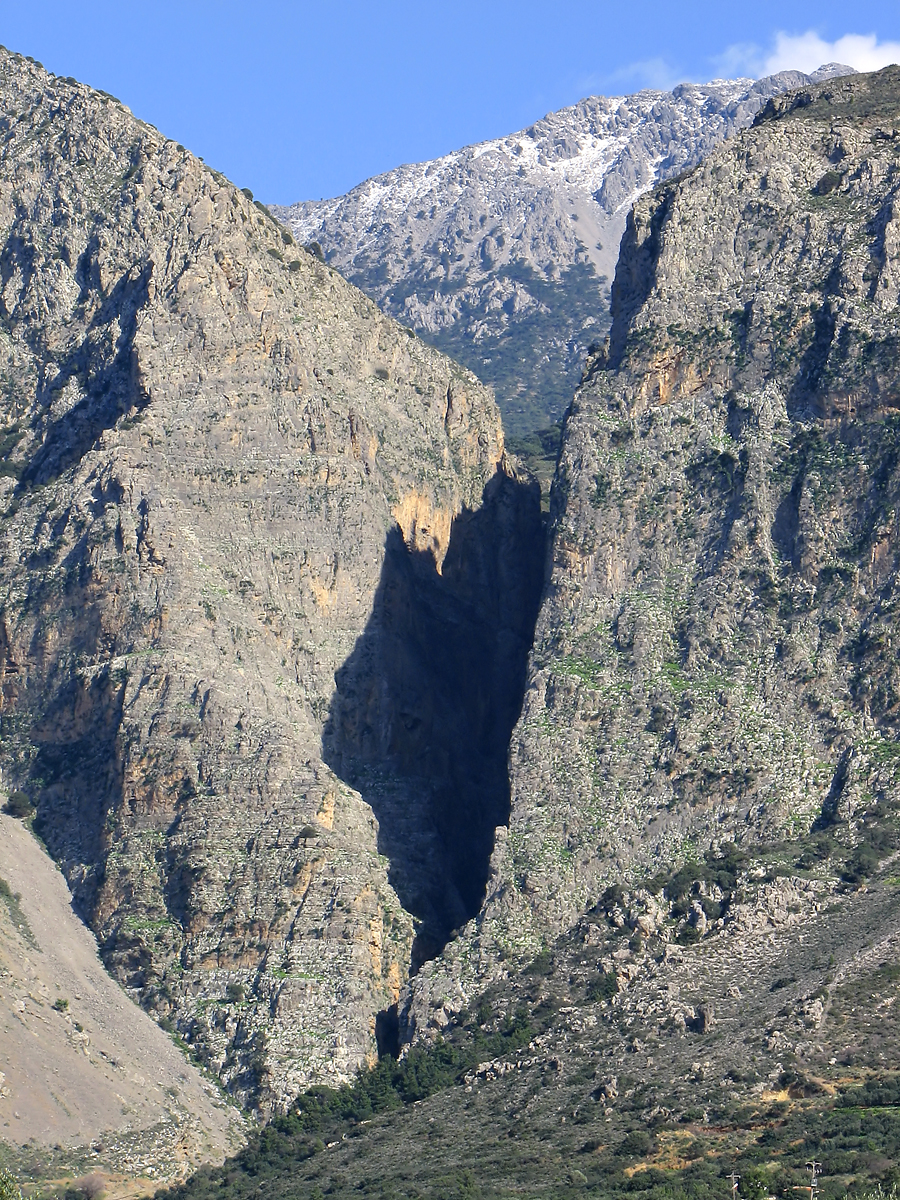
Ha Gorge.

=== Gorges ===
- Orino Gorge, or Red Butterflies Gorge
- Milona Gorge
- Ha Gorge
- Sarakina Gorge
- Mesona Gorge
- Havga Gorge

=== Beaches ===
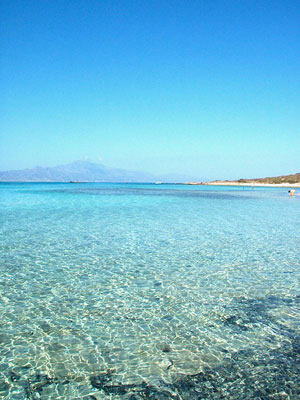
Golden coast.

Ierapetra was selected from among 500 South European destinations by the QualityCoast International Certification Program of EUCC as one of the 50 most attractive tourist destinations for visitors interested in cultural heritage, environment, and sustainability. In 2012, Ierapetra was one of the only three destinations in Greece that won the Gold QualityCoast award. It was ranked 2nd among the Top 100 chosen European destinations.

- Chrysi Island Golden Coast
- Aghios Andreas Beach
- Koutsounari Long Beach
- Livadi Beach in Ferma
- Agia Fotia Beach
- Kakkos Beach
- Galini Beach, Achlia
- Mavros Kolymbos Beach
- Koutsouras Beach
- Kalamokanias Beach in Makry Gialos
- Katovigli / Lagkoufa Beach in Makry Gialos
- Kalamaki Beach
- Tholos Beach in Kavousi
- Pachia Ammos Beach
- Myrtos Beach in Myrtos
- Ammoudares Beach

=== Other ===
- Bramiana Dam is an artificial dam and lake that was made to supply the local greenhouses with water in the dry summer. The lake area is the biggest wetland on Crete, and has become a nature reserve known for its birdlife.
- Mount Dikti
- Mount Thrypti
- Selakano Forest
- Ano Simi

== Climate ==
Ierapetra has a hot-summer Mediterranean climate (Köppen: Csa) with hot, dry summers and mild, rainy winters. Ierapetra's average annual temperature for the period of 1956-2010 was 19.9 °C (68 °F). Ierapetra gets over 3,100 hours of sunshine per year and is Greece's sunniest area alongside Rhodes.

Climate data for Ierapetra, elevation: 18 m or 59 ft, normals 1956-2010
Month	Jan	Feb	Mar	Apr	May	Jun	Jul	Aug	Sep	Oct	Nov	Dec	Year
Mean daily maximum °C (°F)	16.1 (61.0)	16.2 (61.2)	17.7 (63.9)	20.5 (68.9)	24.7 (76.5)	29.3 (84.7)	32.0 (89.6)	32.0 (89.6)	28.9 (84.0)	25.0 (77.0)	21.2 (70.2)	17.8 (64.0)	23.5 (74.2)
Daily mean °C (°F)	12.9 (55.2)	12.9 (55.2)	14.4 (57.9)	17.1 (62.8)	21.2 (70.2)	25.6 (78.1)	28.1 (82.6)	28.0 (82.4)	25.0 (77.0)	21.3 (70.3)	17.7 (63.9)	14.5 (58.1)	19.9 (67.8)
Mean daily minimum °C (°F)	9.2 (48.6)	8.9 (48.0)	10.0 (50.0)	12.1 (53.8)	15.6 (60.1)	19.9 (67.8)	23.2 (73.8)	23.4 (74.1)	20.6 (69.1)	17.2 (63.0)	13.8 (56.8)	10.9 (51.6)	15.4 (59.7)
Average precipitation mm (inches)	100.9 (3.97)	70.7 (2.78)	44.8 (1.76)	20.0 (0.79)	10.4 (0.41)	1.3 (0.05)	0.2 (0.01)	0.7 (0.03)	13.7 (0.54)	41.7 (1.64)	61.8 (2.43)	108.3 (4.26)	474.5 (18.67)
Average precipitation days	12.0	9.7	7.1	4.2	2.7	0.7	0.1	0.2	1.4	4.6	7.1	11.6	61.4
Average relative humidity (%)	73.5	73.1	71.8	68.3	63.4	56.0	49.1	52.5	59.8	68.7	73.0	74.4	65.3
Mean monthly sunshine hours	155.6	158.8	208.3	240.2	319.1	355.4	384.7	367.7	307.5	235.9	201.3	167.0	3,101.5
Source 1: Hellenic National Meteorological Service
Source 2: Sunshine

== Transportation ==
One can travel to Ierapetra by plane through domestic or charter flights to Sitia airport (59 km) or Heraklion airport (94 km). There are also frequent ferry departures from Piraeus to the Sitia and Heraklion ports.

== Chrysi ==
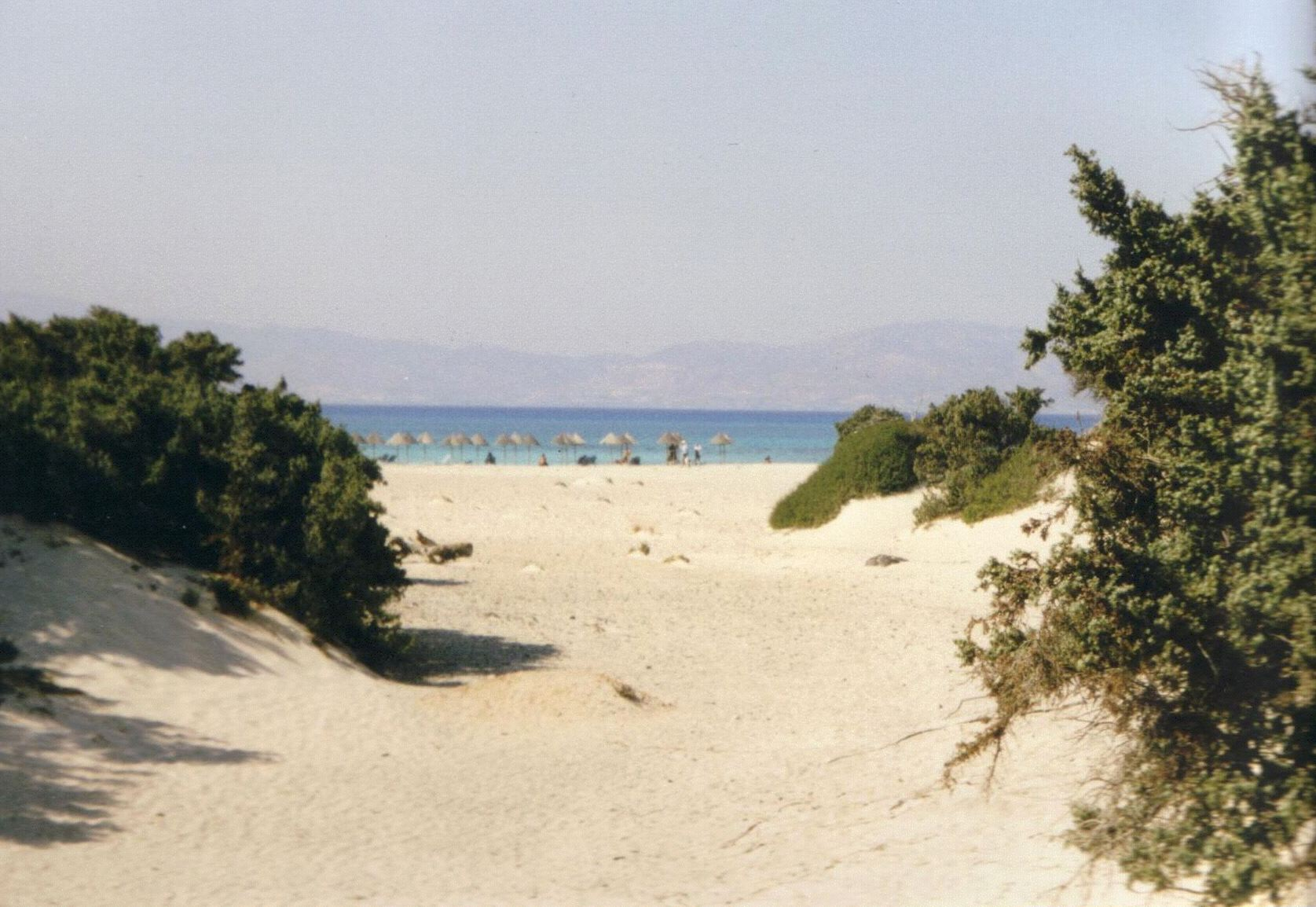
Chrysi beach.

Chrysi (Golden) or Gaidhouronisi (Donkey Island) is an uninhabited island some twelve kilometers (7.5 miles) off the coast of the town of Ierapetra. It is 5 km (3 mi) long and on average one kilometre (0.62 miles) wide. On average, the island is 10 metres (33 feet) above sea level. Kefala, the highest point of the island, is 31 metres (102 feet) above sea level. The island is known for its white beaches, sand dunes, and forest of pines and junipers. The western tip of the island has some remains of past settlement: a few Minoan ruins and a 13th-century Byzantine chapel dedicated to Agios Nikolaos (Saint Nicholas). The main sources of wealth in the settlement were fishing, salt export, and the export of porphyra (Tyrian purple), a scarlet dye made from shells. After the collapse of the Byzantine Empire, the island was abandoned, although it was later used as a hideout.

Nowadays the island is protected as an "area of intense natural beauty". As camping is forbidden on the island, only day trips are possible. Ferries leave the quay at Ierapetra daily at 10 A.M. and return at 5 P.M. Visitors are not allowed to roam freely over the island, but only on designated paths and some beaches close to the eastern tip of the island. The rocky islet of Mikronisi (Small Island) lies 700 metres (2,297 feet) to the east of Chrysi.

== Minoan sites ==
- Gournia, Minoan city in Mirambelo (Mirabello) Gulf
- Pyrgos, between Myrtos and Nea Myrtos
- Vasiliki, near the village of the same name
- Makry Gialos, Minoan site
- Episkopi
- Anatoli, Minoan site

== Ierapetra in popular culture ==
- In the 1964 movie Zorba the Greek, the famous scene in which Anthony Quinn dances the Sirtaki on the beach was shot on Ierapetra Beach.
- In the 1994 movie Legends of the Fall, Tristan Ludlow (Brad Pitt), after returning from a long journey, gifts a ring from Ierapetra to his future wife, Isabelle II.
- R. Graves refers to Ierapetra in two of his books: "King Jesus" and "Hercules, my shipmate".
- Luis Sepúlveda mentions Ierapetra in the introduction of his book "Mundo del fin del mundo" (The World at the End of the World).

== Gallery ==
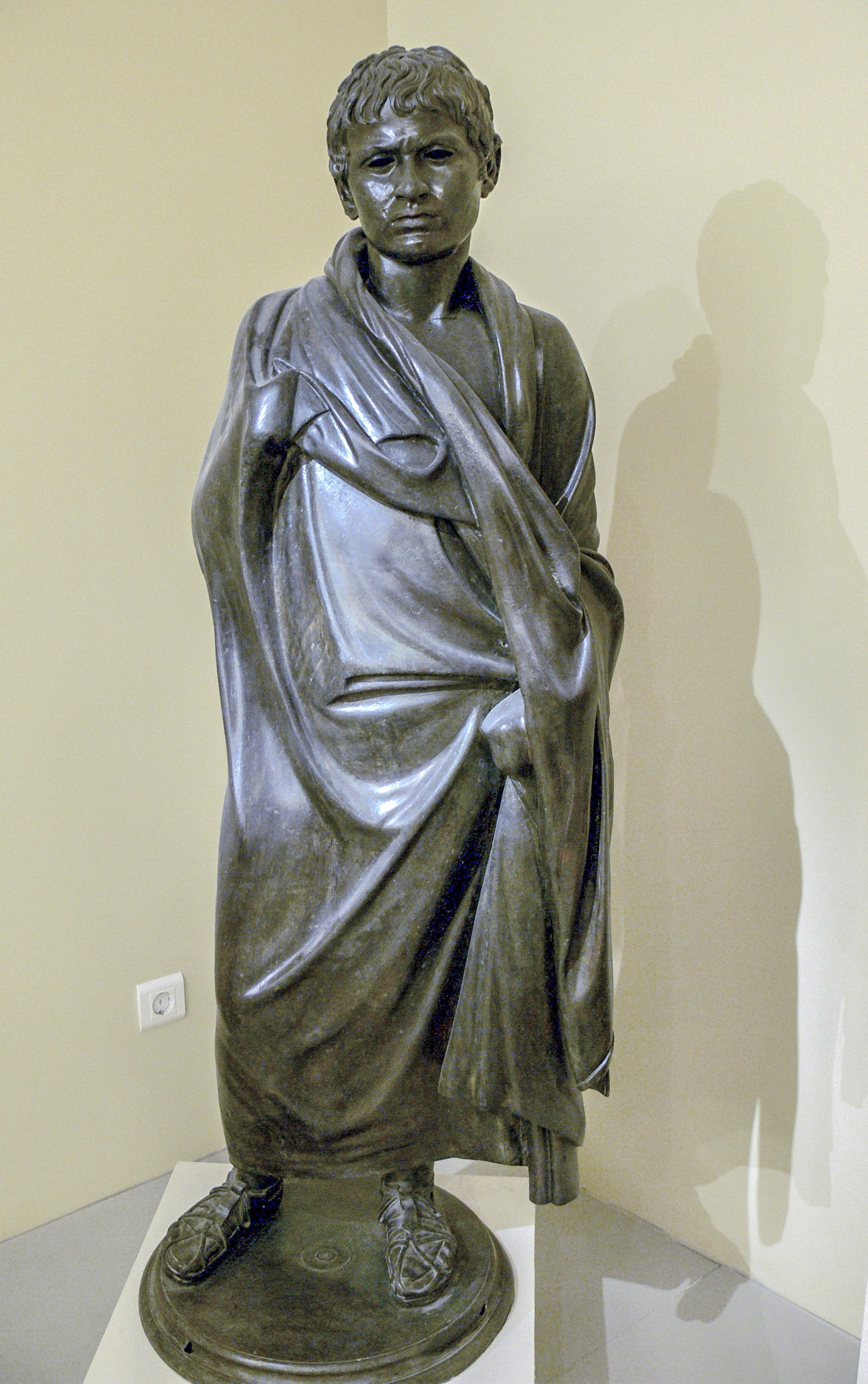
Bronze statue of a young boy found in Ierapetra (1st century BC) in Heraklion Archaeological Museum

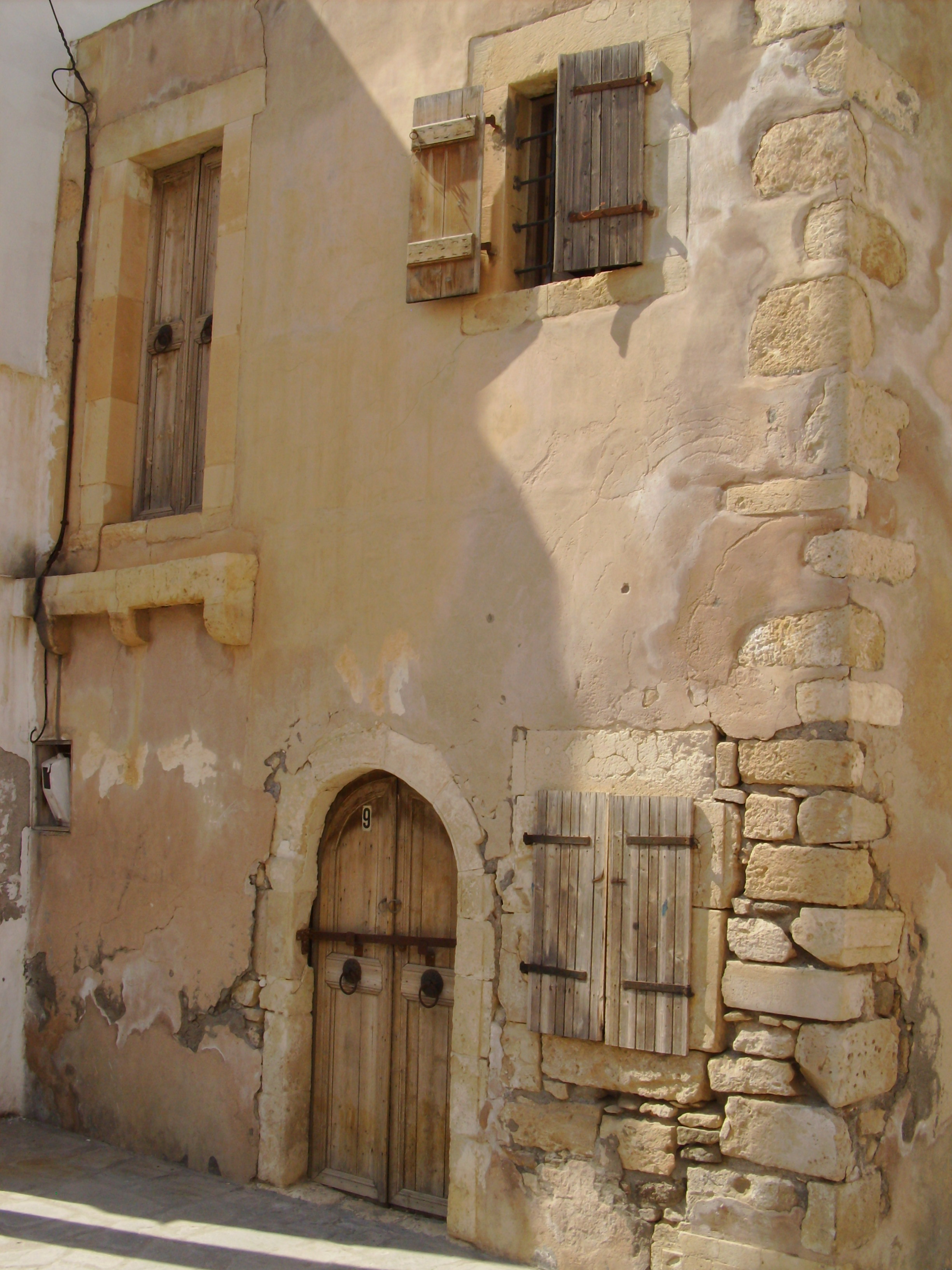
Napoleon's residence

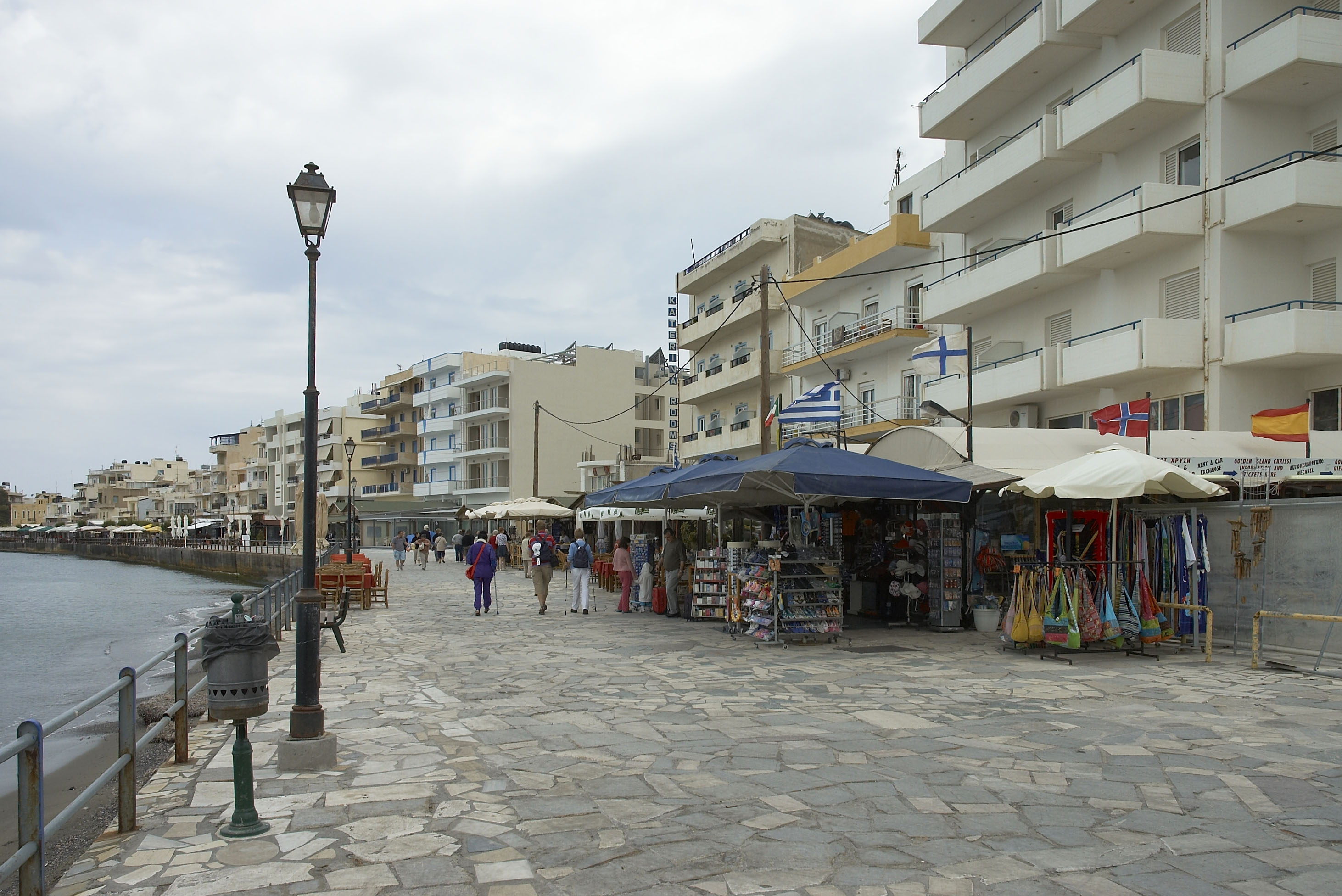
The promenade

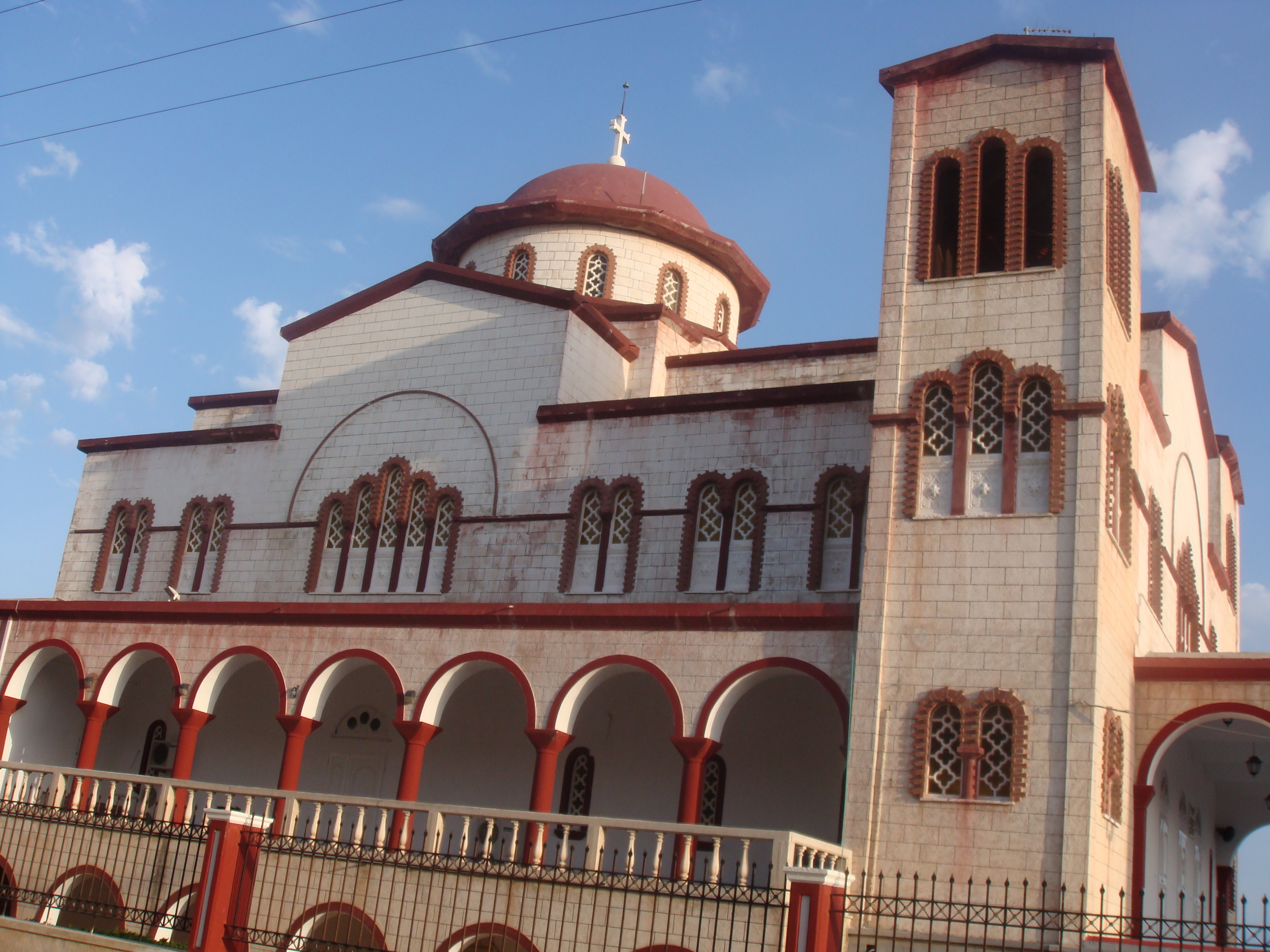
The church of Agia Fotini
