= Koutsounari =

Village in Crete, Greece

Coordinates: 35°01′N 25°50′E

View on Koutsounari from northeast

Koutsounari (Greek: Κουτσουνάρι) is a settlement of 437 inhabitants on the island of Crete, along the slope of the Sitia Mountains. It is located 8 kilometers east of Ierapetra and 43 kilometers southeast of Agios Nikolaos. The village was established in the 1970s. Today it is best known for the nearby holiday destination of Long Beach.
