= Ferma, Greece =

Locality in Creek islands, Greece

Coordinates: 35.018074°N 25.852001°E

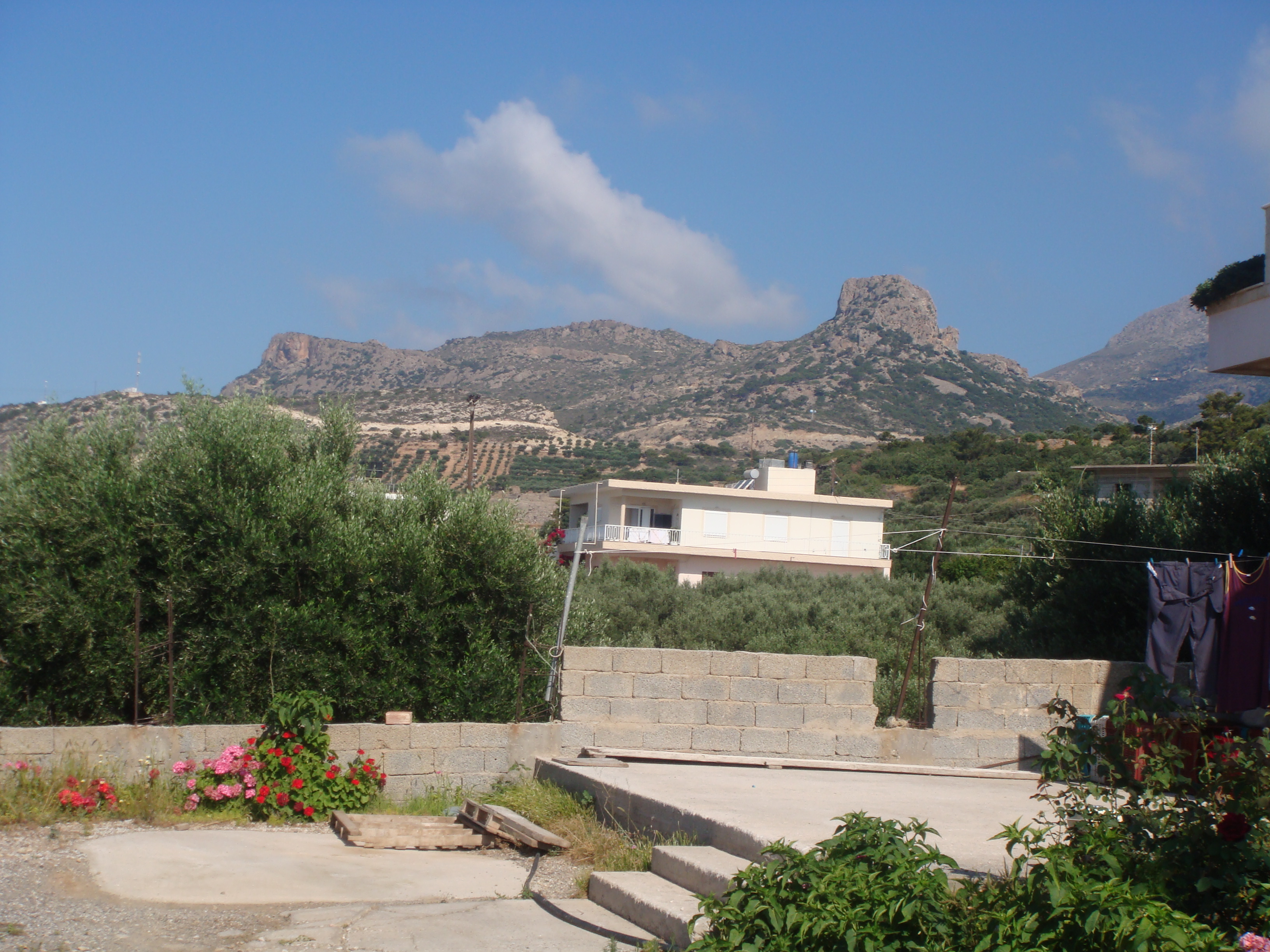
A view from Ferma, a village in Lasithi prefecture.

Ferma is a settlement in the municipality of Ierapetra on the island of Crete. It is situated at the coast, 11 kilometers east of Ierapetra.
