= Stauroupolis =

Stauropolis, Stauroupolis, Stavroupoli(s), or Stavropoli(s) (Ancient Greek: Σταυρούπολις 'city of the cross', genitive Σταυροπόλεως Stauropoleos) may refer to various places and other entities. The spelling in u is a transliteration; the spelling in v reflects the Byzantine and modern pronunciation.

== Places ==
- Stauroupolis, the Byzantine name of Aphrodisias in Caria, Asia Minor
- Stavroupoli, a suburb of Thessaloniki, Greece
- Stavroupoli, Xanthi, a village in Northern Greece
- Stavropol, a city in Southern Russia
- Stavros (Galatia), ancient town in Asia Minor, also called Stavropolis; see Verinopolis

== Other ==
- 1147 Stavropolis, a stony asteroid named for the Russian city
- Milo Stavroupolis, a character on Little House on the Prairie
- Stauropolis (diocese), the former diocese of Aphrodisias, subsisting as a Greek Orthodox and Roman Catholic titular see
- Stavropoleos Monastery in Bucharest, Romania

== See also ==
- Stavros (disambiguation), name of various places, some also called Stavropolis
- Stavropol (disambiguation), various locations in Russia
- Stavropolsky (disambiguation), various locations in Russia
- Stavrochori (disambiguation), various villages in Greece
- Stavropoulos, Greek family name
- Stauropolia, a genus of moth
