= Orino Gorge =

Canyon in Crete, Greece

Geography
- Coordinates: 35°02′44″N 25°55′49″E
- Interactive map of Orino Gorge

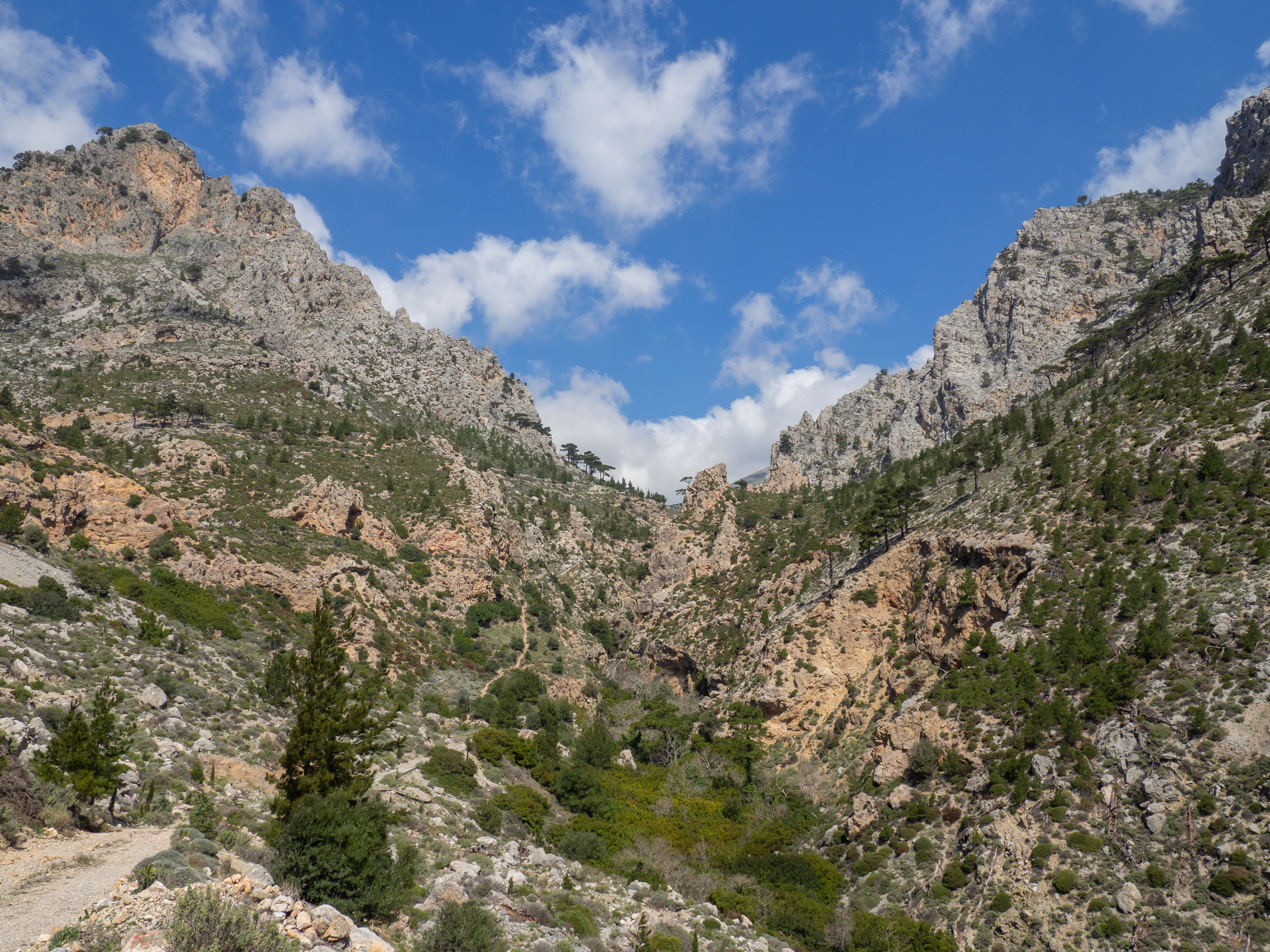
Orino Gorge

The Gorge (of) Orino or Canyon Red Butterfly is a canyon in southeastern Crete. It is located near the village of Oreino and is 5 km in length.

== History ==
In 1993, a major fire devastated the canyon. In the years since, the green vegetation has been fully restored. Before the fire, the canyon was known for its countless red butterflies, hence its name. While these butterflies still exist, their numbers have greatly diminished.

The canyon begins near the village of Oreino and ends near Koutsouras, approximately 21 kilometers east of Ierapetra.

The canyon trails have signs indicating the direction of travel. However, it is still possible to get lost in the gorge.

== Geography ==
The canyon can be divided into three sections. The first section features lush green vegetation, while the second is a mountainous region. In the third section, near the end of the gorge, the terrain rises, providing an unobstructed view of the mountain.

One characteristic of the gorge is its many small streams and waterfalls.

The time to traverse the canyon varies with the season. In the summer, the course typically does not exceed four hours. However, in the winter, the presence of running water from streams and waterfalls might lengthen the journey.

== Gallery ==
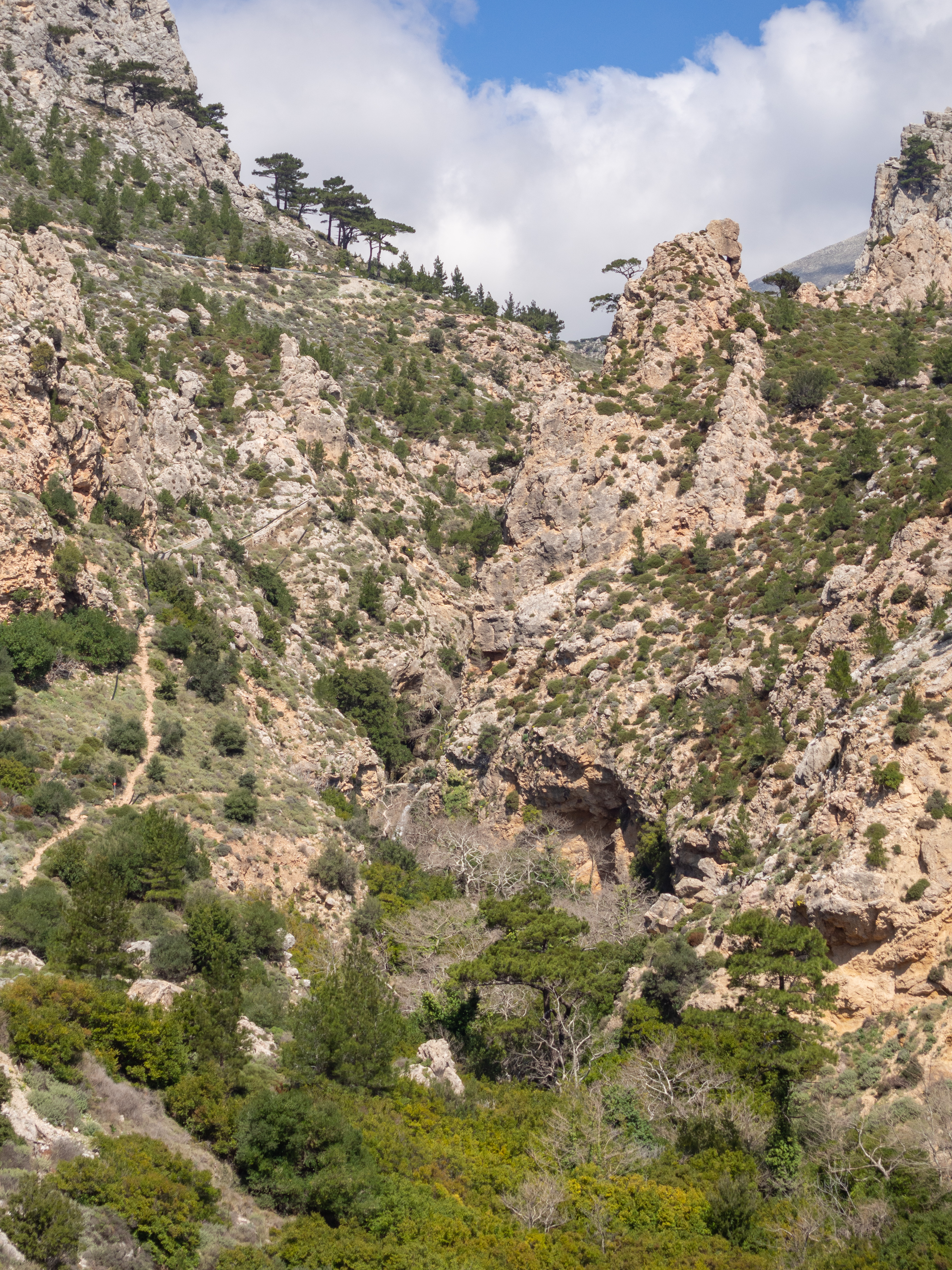
View of the gorge

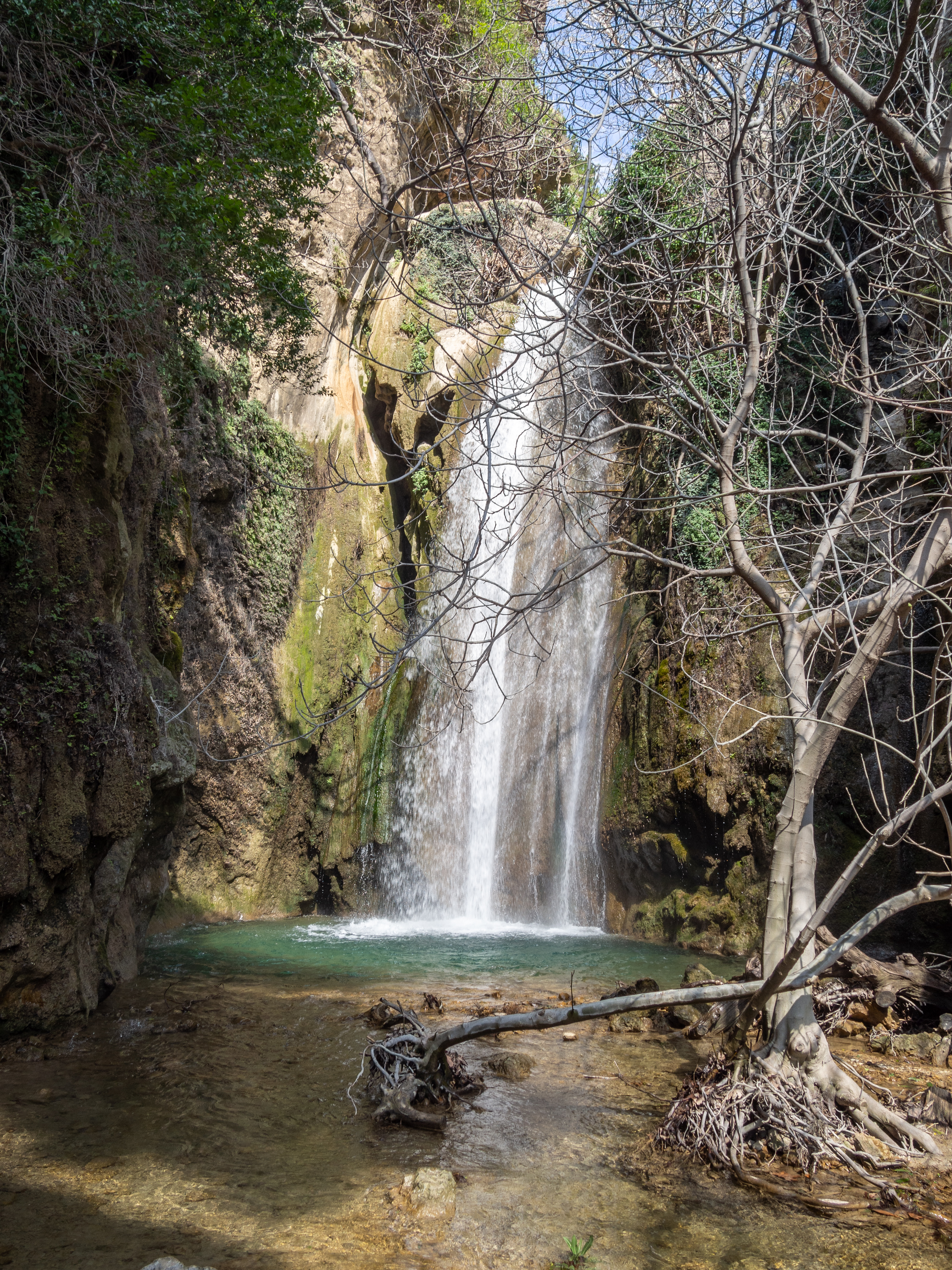
Waterfall in Oreino Gorge

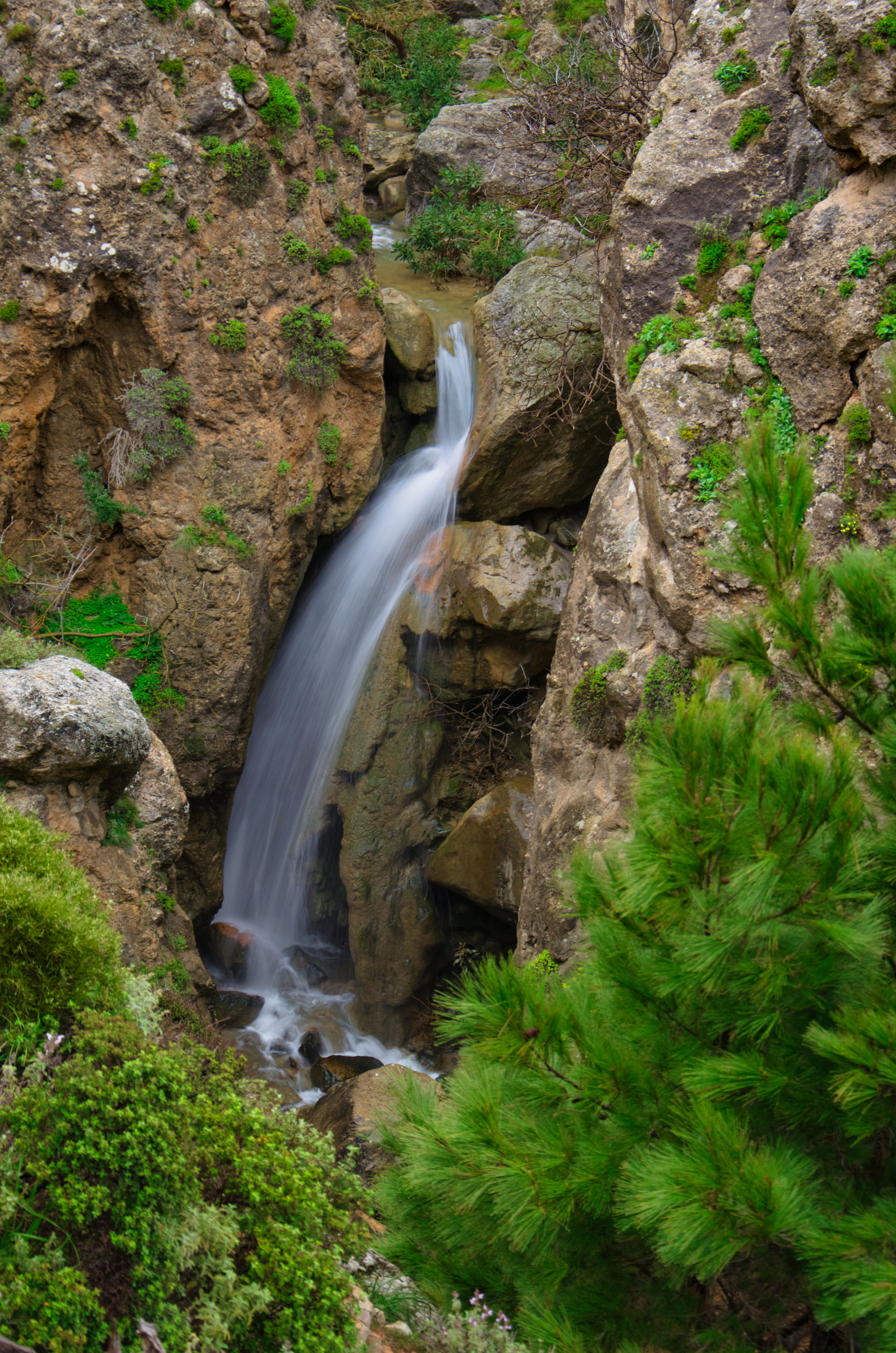
Waterfall in Oreino Gorge
