= Agios Stefanos, Crete =

Agios Stefanos Άγιος Στέφανος
- Community
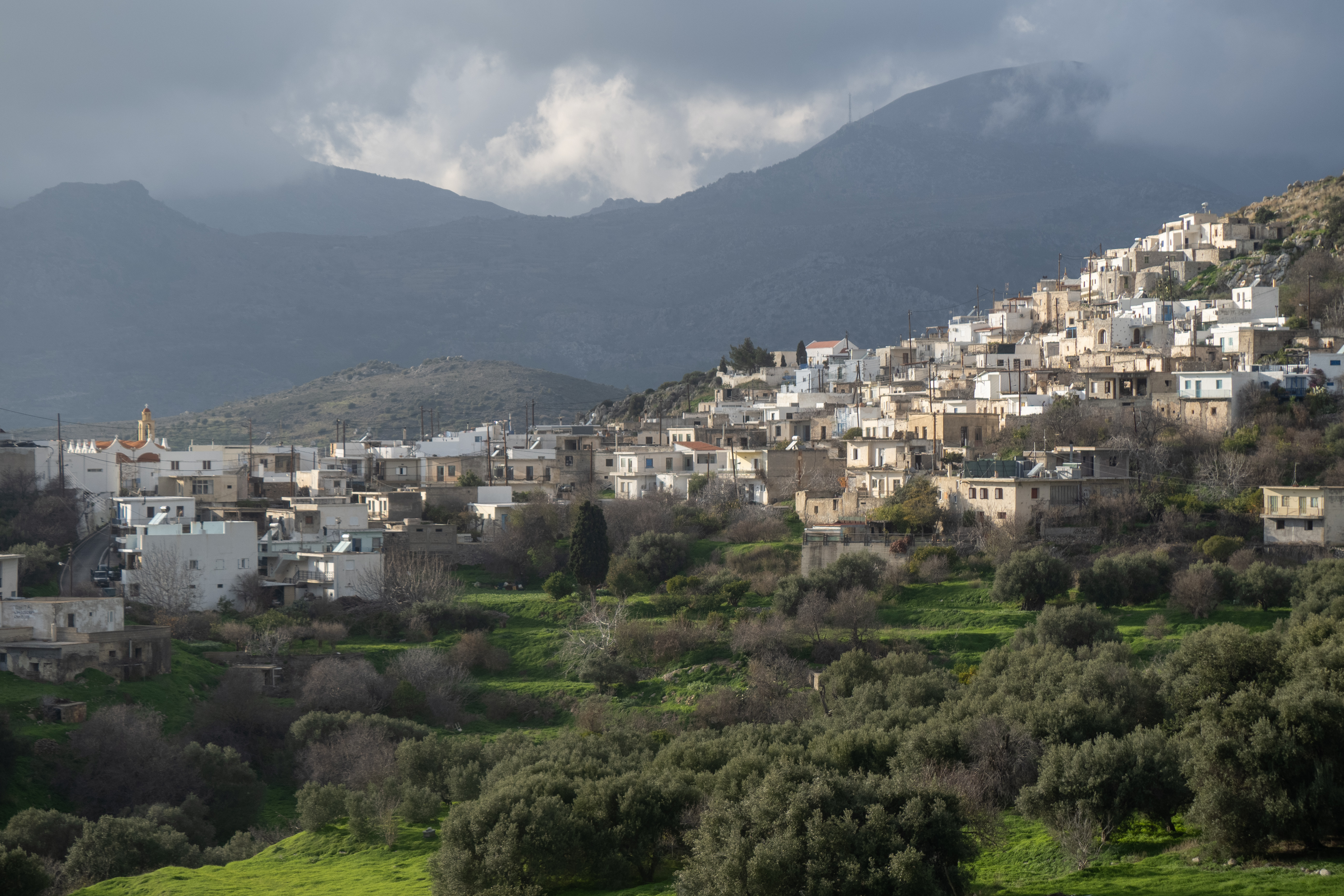
- View of the village

- Location within Greece
- Coordinates: 35°04′16″N 25°58′12″E
- Country: Greece
- Administrative region: Crete
- Regional unit: Lasithi
- Municipality: Ierapetra
- Municipal unit: Makry Gialos

Population (2021)
  - Community: 900
- Time zone: UTC+2 (EET)
  - Summer (DST): UTC+3 (EEST)

Agios Stefanos is a village within the Lasithi prefecture in eastern Crete. It belonged to the former province of Siteia until that was abolished in 2006. Between 1997 and 2010, it was part of the former Makry Gialos municipality. Today, it is part of Ierapetra municipality. It is located 30 kilometers north-east of Ierapetra, 40 kilometers southwest of Sitia, and six kilometers east of Stavrohori. It can be approached through the famous forest of Pefkoseli. Its patron is Saint Stephen. Saint Stephen church, at the entrance of the village, is an ecclesiastical and historical monument of Crete. Since the last decade, the majority of the population has been moved to the village's seaside settlement of Makry Gialos, some six kilometers to the south. Makry Gialos is one of Crete's most important tourist resorts.

The village's previous name was Gras or Greas mentioned by Piero Castrofilaca, the Venetian accountant of Crete in 1583. Castrofilaca recorded in Gras 305 inhabitants that time. The wall is still visible today lay on the north side of the village. The wall standing was part of a larger Venetian fortification build around 1600. It stands on earlier fortifications probably of Byzantine or Saracen origin. Many local surnames today have Venetian roots and that it this increases the possibility that Agios Stefanos was the center of the local government and garrison once. The old name of Agios Stefanos, Grea also indicates a Latin origin (Grea is a North Italian surname). Further north from Agios Stefanos village they are ruins from Venetian built terraces for vineyards, olive groves and other crops. Agios Stefanos today produces around 300tons of olive oil. Sir Arthur Evans passed from the area in 1898 and mentioned the standing walls from a fortress in his diary.

The village was the birthplace of Anagnostis Funtalides a Cretan MP in 1879. He and another villager, Emmanuel Kamenakis were the leaders of the 1866 revolution in Sitia against the Ottomans. In Agios Stefanos was also the birthplace of Fundalides son Emmanuel, also an MP in late 19th century.
