= Kalo Nero (disambiguation) =

Kalo Nero may refer to:

- Kalo Nero, a village and a local district in Avlona, Messenia, Peloponnese
- Kalo Nero, a village in Makrys Gialos, Lasithi, Crete
- Kalo Nero, a village in Nikaia, Larissa, Thessaly
