= Galini =

Galini may refer to:

- Galini, Cyprus, deserted village in Cyprus
- Galini, village in Schinokapsala community, Lasithi, Crete, Greece
- Agia Galini, village in Rethymno regional unit, Crete, Greece
