= Kapsa Monastery =

Greek Orthodox monastery in Crete, Greece

- Μονή Καψά
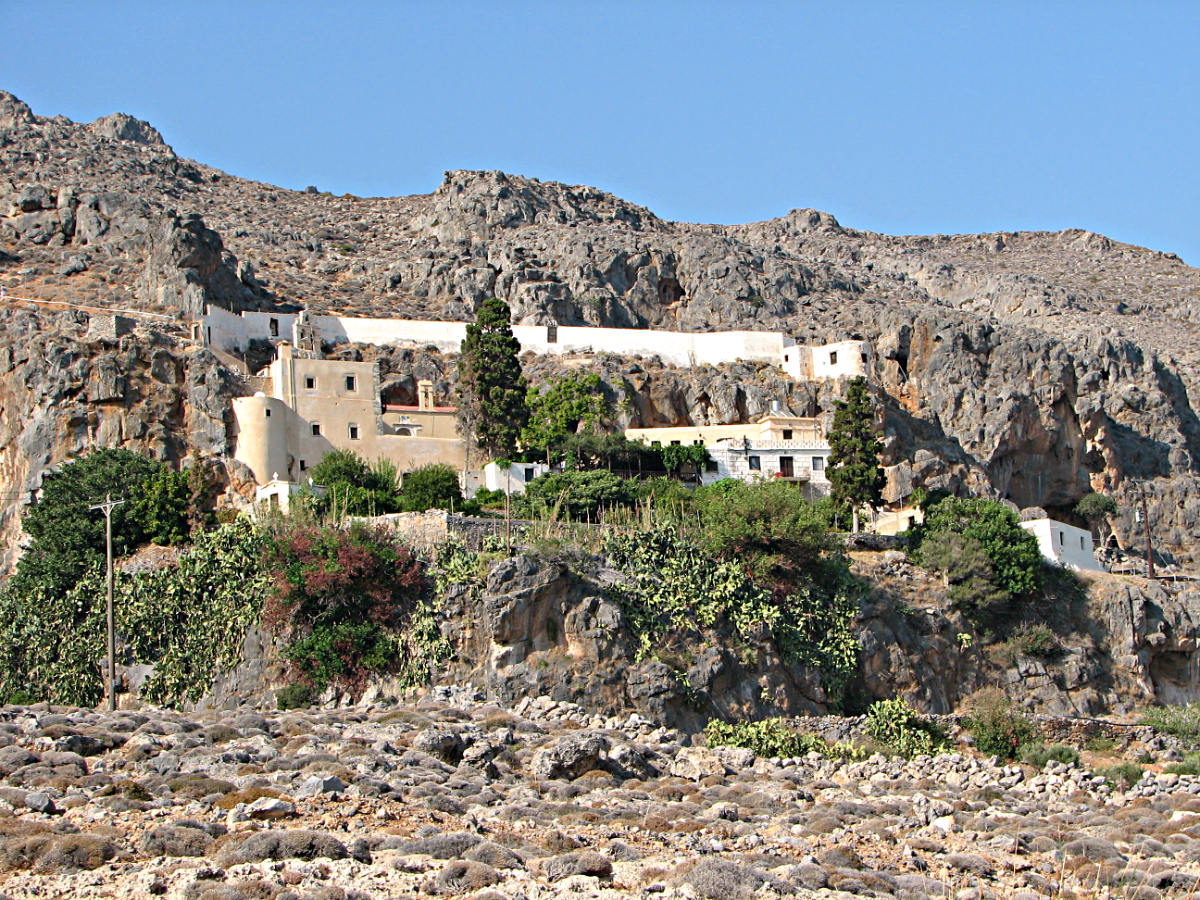
- The monastery in 2016

- Location of the monastery in Crete
- Interactive map of Kapsa Monastery

Monastery information
- Full name: Monastery of Agios Ioannis Kapsa
- Order: Ecumenical Patriarchate of Constantinople
- Denomination: Greek Orthodox
- Mother house: Toplou Monastery
- Dedication: St. John the Baptist
- Celebration: August 29
- Archdiocese: Church of Crete

Architecture
- Status: Monastery
- Functional status: Active
- Style: Byzantine
- Completion date: c. 15th century; 1841 (rebuild)

Site
- Location: near Makrys Gialos and Sitia, Crete
- Country: Greece
- Coordinates: 35°1′13″N 26°3′7″E

The Kapsa Monastery (Greek: Μονή Καψά, romanized: Moni Kapsa), officially the Monastery of Agios Ioannis Kapsa, is a Greek Orthodox monastery situated between the villages of Makrys Gialos and Sitia in the west and Goudouras and Ierapetra in the east, on the southeast coast of Crete, Greece. It is built on a steep, rocky mountainside near the exit of the Perivolakia gorge, which overlooks the Libyan Sea. The Kapsa Monastery functions as a monastery for male monks.

== Overview ==
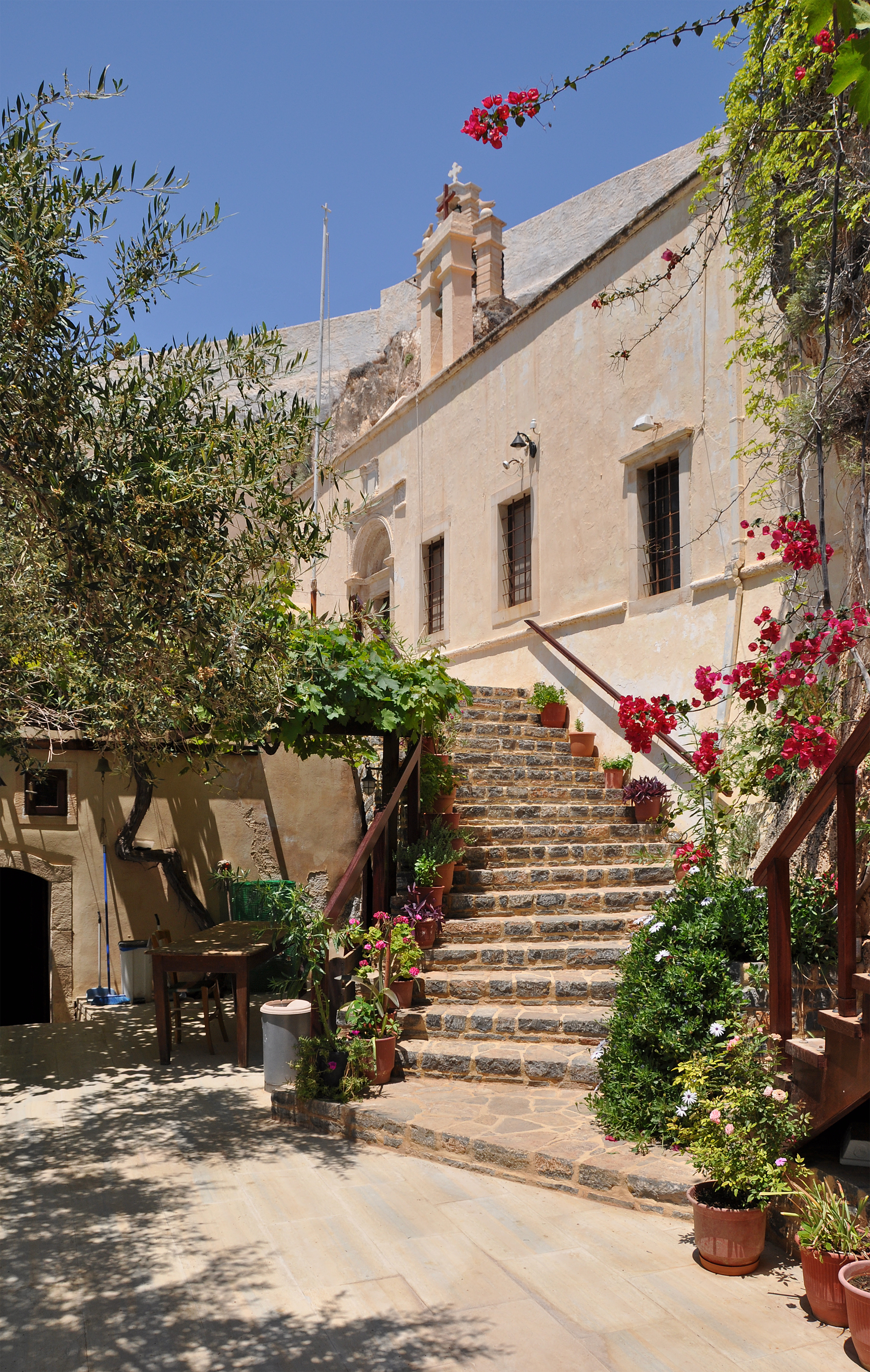
Stairs to the monastery church

The Kapsa Monastery was most probably established in the fifteenth century, although no exact date of its founding is known. In 1471, Ottoman pirates raided the monastery and destroyed a large part of it. In 1841, it was rebuilt by a famous monk, Joseph Gerakionts who spent his last years in a nearby cave. The Kapsa Monastery is a metochion of the Toplou Monastery. During the Axis occupation of Crete, the monastery often sheltered Greek partisans and allied soldiers of the Allies.

According to a book authored by Richard Wilmott, the monastery was the hidden location during the 1970s of Lord Lucan, a British peer suspected of murder.

The main building (katholikon) is a two-nave church dedicated to St. John the Baptist. A few fragments of Byzantine-era frescoes have survived.

== See also ==
- Church of Crete
- List of Greek Orthodox monasteries in Greece
