= Stavrochori =

Stavrochori (Greek meaning cross town) may refer to several villages in Greece:

- Stavrochori, Kilkis, a village in the Kilkis regional unit
- Stavrochori, Lasithi, a village in Lasithi
- Stavrochori, Preveza, a village in the Preveza regional unit
