= Makry Gialos =

Makry Gialos Μακρύ Γιαλός
- Municipal unit
- Location within the regional unit

- Location within Greece
- Coordinates: 35°04′N 25°58′E
- Country: Greece
- Administrative region: Crete
- Regional unit: Lasithi
- Municipality: Ierapetra

Area
  - Municipal unit: 75.4 km^{2} (29.1 sq mi)

Population (2021)
  - Municipal unit: 2,589
  - Municipal unit density: 34.3/km^{2} (88.9/sq mi)
- Time zone: UTC+2 (EET)
  - Summer (DST): UTC+3 (EEST)
- Vehicle registration: AN

Makry Gialos (Greek: Μακρύ Γιαλός) is a former municipality in Lasithi, Crete, Greece, with a population 2,589 in 2021. It is located on the south-east coast of Crete. Since the 2011 local government reform it is part of the municipality Ierapetra, of which it is a municipal unit. The municipal unit has an area of 75.376 km^{2} (29.103 sq mi). The seat of the municipality was in Koutsouras, 22 kilometers east of Ierapetra. It was established in 1997 when the communities of Stavrochori, Chrysopigi, Lithines, Schinokapsala, Agios Stefanos, Oreino, Perivolakia and Pefkoi amalgamated into one municipality (Δήμος). In November 2011 the four communities Chrysopigi, Lithines, Perivolakia and Pefkoi passed to the municipality Siteia.

The name Makry Gialos - or, alternatively, Makry-Gialos, Makrygialos, Makriyialos, or Makrigialos - is also specifically given both to a village and tourist centre on the coast within the municipality, and to the nearby archaeological site of an ancient Minoan country house.

== Geography ==
Makry Gialos region lies on the southeast coast of Crete island, Greece. The area faces the Libyan Sea ( part of Mediterranean Sea, which separates Crete from North Africa). The backdrop of the area is mountainous and made up primarily of granite. From the mountains there are small valleys and gorges leading down to the coast. On the higher slopes there is an abundance of walnut, apple, pear and olive trees. On the lower slopes the main industry is farming and olive trees.

Down below along the main coastal road, farming can also be found along with the greenhouses, in which most of the produce grown is tomatoes, cucumbers, peppers, aubergines and bananas, which grow all year round. The sun and the rich soil give more taste to the fruit and vegetables, and the region has won the gold medal for the extra virgin olive oil (SITIA 0.03). The famous PDO SITIA xygalo cheese is also produced in the area of Sitia province. The morphology of the land presents beautiful landscapes, varying from place to place. Places with pine forest and wild oak trees, with granite nuggets and sharp rocks. Places with smooth hillsides with low bush land or orchards, and olive groves. The coastline that runs from Galini to Kalo Nero, is etched with rocky inlets, small coves and long sweeping stretches of sand and pebble beaches. The Bay of Makry Gialos boasts the longest shallow sandy beach of East Crete. Other beaches are Diaskari, Langada, Amoudi, Mavros Kolimbos, Galini, Koutsouras; some of them are commercial beaches and some are deserted. Between the mountains there are dried up riverbeds, which are flowing down to the sea during the winter months.

== Demographics ==
The population of the area is approximately 4,200. Before the introduction of tourism and greenhouses, the life revolved mainly up in the villages, which you find nestled in the mountains. A lot of them are not visible from the sea, for this reason they were safe from pirates. Back in the early days the main work for the villagers was farming or tending their flocks on the higher peaks. Today, life revolves around the coast. People have come down from the villages to the coast to live, as there is more work in the towns and resorts. The older generations still live up in the villages along with their history and old stories. Also foreigners who have bought old houses, using them as holiday homes are settling in the old charming villages.

The main industry today around Makrigialos is tourism, greenhouses and the harvesting of the olive trees. The Cretan dialect spoken in this region is near to ancient Greek.

The modern villages are built along the coastal road between Sitia and Ierapetra. On the boundary of the area are Achlia, Mavros Kolimbos, Koutsouras, Makry-Gialos village, Analipsi, Lagada and Kalo Nero with many apartments, studios and hotels.

There are gorges in the region. The Butterfly gorge in Koutsouras, Pefki gorge above the White River hamlet, and Pervolakia gorge which starts from the Kapsa Monastery.

The highest peak is Afendis Stavromenos 1,500 metres (4,500 feet). The only possible way to reach the top is to walk or in a jeep 4 X 4. The summit affords views of Eastern Crete, Sitia, Agios Nikolaos, Elounda, Ierapetra and the surrounding islands of Chrissi and Koufonisi, depending on the visibility. On this peak is the small windswept chapel of Jesus Cross. During the winter months the peak is covered with snow.

Other places nearby are Schinokapsala, Oreino, Stavrochori, Bebonas, Chrisopigi, Lapithos, Agios Stefanos, Pefkoi, Lithines, Upper and Lower Pervolakia. These feature stone built houses and narrow paved streets, along with ancient stonewashed houses. There are many small churches scattered around the hillside on the top of peaks, built in caves, and by the side of springs. These churches represent the predominant Orthodox religion.

Along the coast about 6 km from Makry Gialos, is the Kapsa Monastery, built on a sheer rock face, close to the spectacular Perivolakia Gorge which is believed to have been founded in the 15th century. In 1471 it was destroyed by pirates and abandoned. In 1841 it was renovated by Yerontoyannis a reformed robber who lived there as a hermit. He built the church and dedicated it to John the Baptist. Inside the chapel Yerontoyannis' skull can be found. The monastery celebrates its feast day on 29 August.

The area often experiences strong winds, like most of the Greek Islands. These winds are called "Meltemi". They are strong northern winds, blowing mostly in January and February and in July and August. During the summer these winds help to keep the temperatures down and during the winter months they give clear and sunny days. The area has a long summer, six to seven months, but not too hot. The winter is short and mild. Rainy days are few and a long time passes between them. The temperatures almost never go as low as six degrees.

== Archaeological site ==
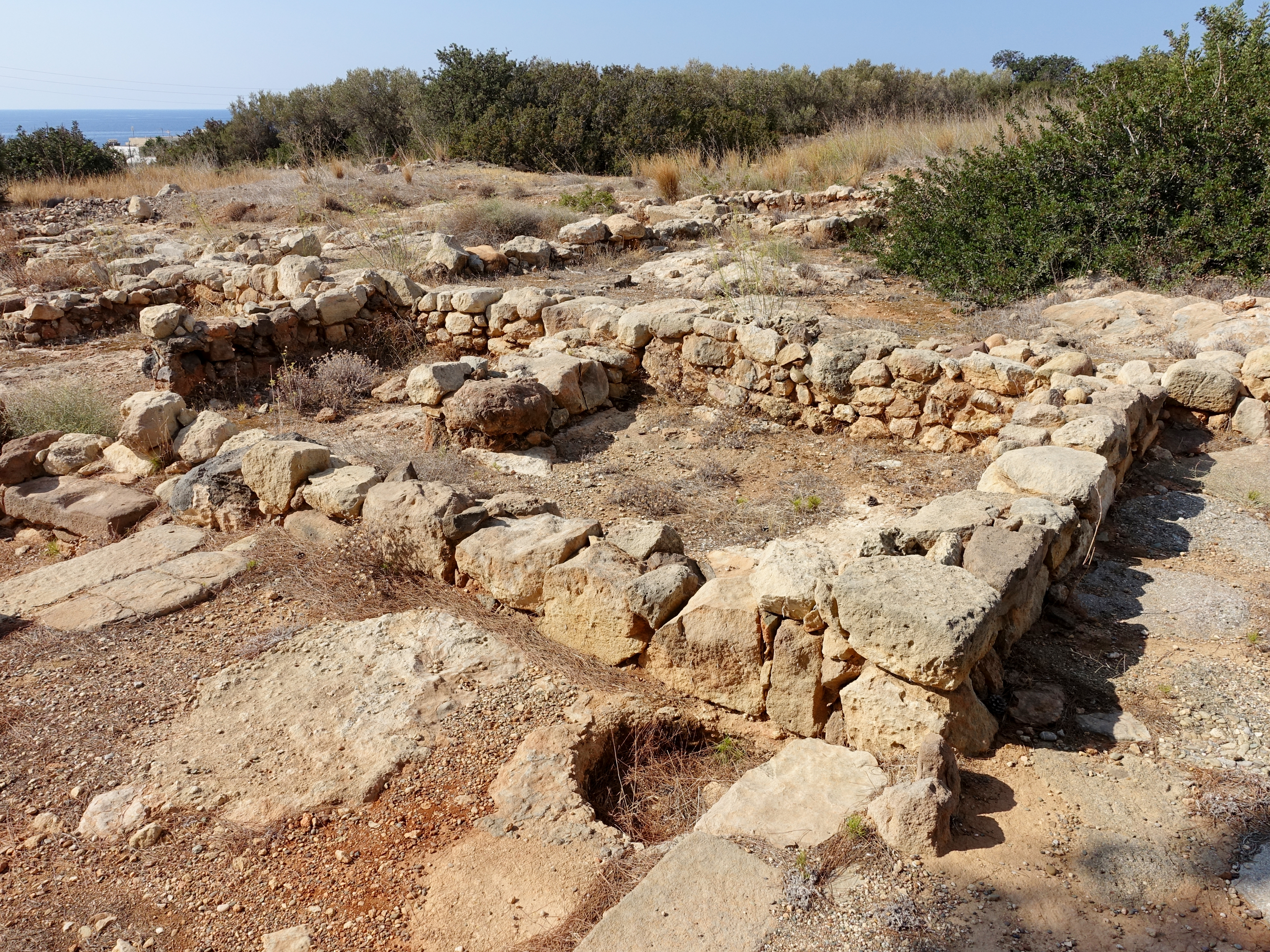
Minoan Villa of Makrygialos

Makry Gialos features the archaeological site of an ancient Minoan country house. The site is located to the west of the village. Some of the artifacts which have been excavated can be found in the Archaeological Museum of Agios Nikolaos. The site was first excavated in 1973 and 1977 by Costas Davaras. The villa in Makriyialos was in use during Late Minoan IB, and evidence indicates that it may have been used exclusively during this period. The building has a central court on the north–south axis. The area of the court is 6m x 12.5m, which is exactly four times smaller than the courts of the Minoan palaces at Phaistos, Malia, Knossos and Zakros.

Suggestions that the building was a "cult villa," similar to those of Nirou, Amnisos, Kannia and Vathypetro have not been proven. The finds at Makriyialos site were not as rich as those at the other cult villa sites but it is believed that they nevertheless support a view that the building is a "cult villa". The building itself, which was badly damaged by crops and livestock, dates to around 1500-1400 BC. The house has unique architecture and bears some resemblance to Minoan palaces seen at that time. The house contains a central small rectangular court, contributing to the building's uniqueness.

Two columns on the north side and northern east side strike similarities to Malia, where alternating pillars are found at exactly the same side. The site of Phaistos also denotes two columnar supports on the north and northern east side as well. A large altar can be found in the northern end of the court. In Zakros, we also see a similar placement of the altar. Facing the altar is the large bench which was almost certainly used in the ceremonies that took place in the court. Such benches have also been found at Malia and Phaistos.

== Transportation ==
One can travel to Makry Gialos by plane boarding onto domestic or charter flights to Sitia airport (33 km) or Heraklion airport (121 km). There are also frequent ferry departures from Piraeus to Sitia and Heraklion harbours.
