= Stavropol (disambiguation) =

Stavropol is a city in Stavropol Krai, Russia.

Stavropol may also refer to:

- Stavropol Krai, the federal subject of Russia
  - Stavropol Urban Okrug, a municipal formation in and around the city of Stavropol in Stavropol Krai
  - Stavropol Soviet Republic, short-lived division of the RSFSR in 1918, merged into the North Caucasian Soviet Republic
  - Stavropol Governorate, a former unit of Russian Empire that roughly corresponds with the modern day Stavropol Krai
- Stavropol, former name of Tolyatti, a city in Samara Oblast, Russia

== See also ==
- Stauroupolis (disambiguation)
- Stavropolovka, a village in the Chuy Province of Kyrgyzstan
- Stavropolsky (disambiguation)
