= Oreino, Lasithi =

Oreino Ορεινό
- Community
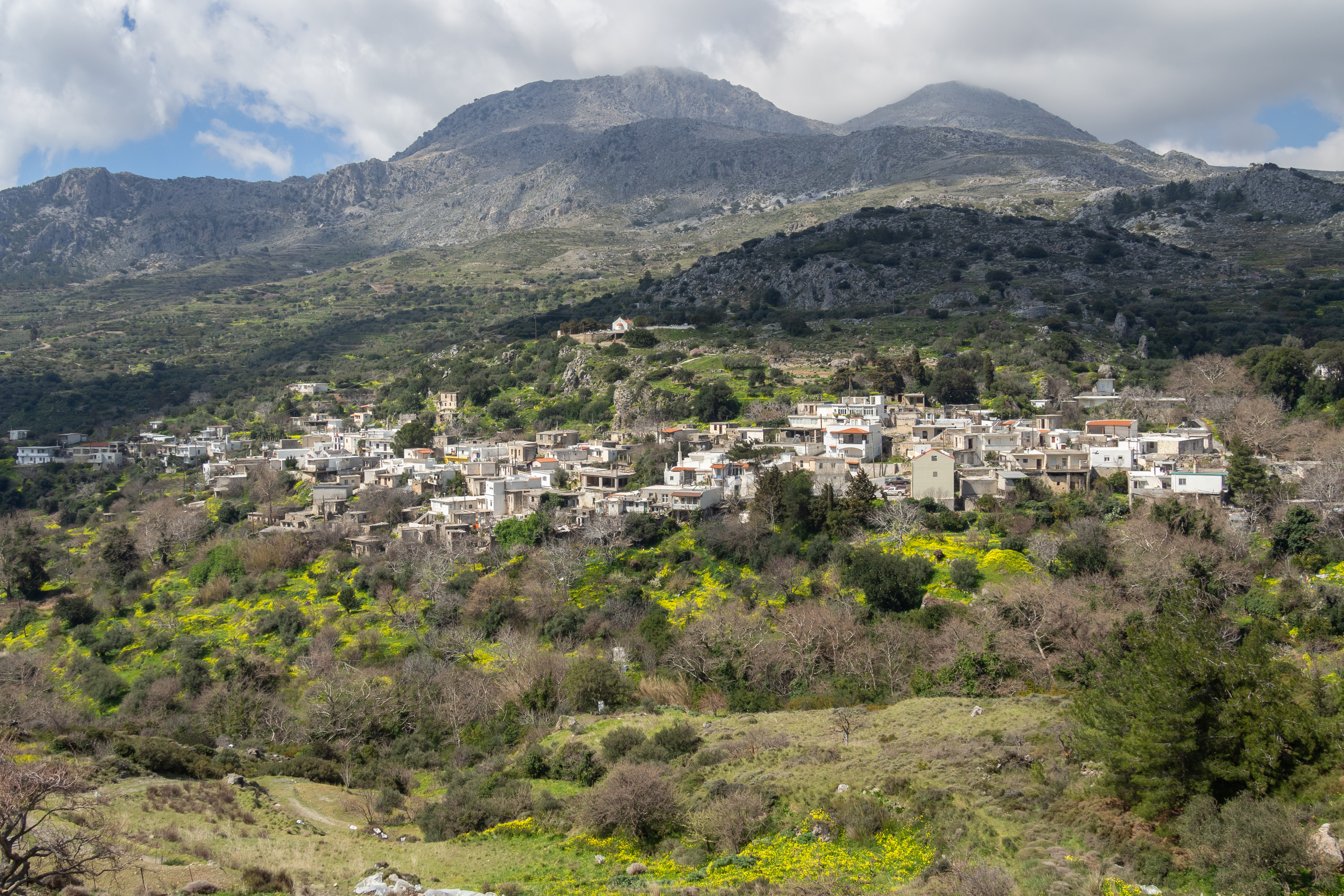

- Location within Greece
- Coordinates: 35°04′48″N 25°54′47″E
- Country: Greece
- Administrative region: Crete
- Regional unit: Lasithi
- Municipality: Ierapetra
- Municipal unit: Makry Gialos

Population (2021)
  - Community: 314
- Time zone: UTC+2 (EET)
  - Summer (DST): UTC+3 (EEST)

Oreino (Greek: Ορεινό) is a small village in Lasithi regional unit on Crete, Greece. It is situated 28 kilometers northeast of Ierapetra and lies 10 kilometers from the Cretan south coast. Since 2011, it is part of the Ierapetra municipality. It is situated at 650 meters above sea level ('oreinos' means mountainous in Greek), east of the Thrypti mountains, in an area rich in vegetation. A gorge with the same name is also part of the village and contained a neo-Byzantine church with frescos.

Some scholars believe that the father of the poet Dionysios Solomos was from Oreino, based on an alternative place name Solomika, as well as the remains of a tower where the Solomon family is believed to have lived prior to the Ottoman conquest of Crete in 1669.
