= Archaeological Museum of Agios Nikolaos =

Museum in Agios Nikolaos, Crete, Greece

Coordinates: 35.1939°N 25.7153°E

The Archaeological Museum of Agios Nikolaos is a museum in Agios Nikolaos, Crete, Greece. The first collection was established in 1969. The present building opened to the public in 2024 after undergoing an extensive renovation.

== Room 1 ==
The largest collection, displaying items excavated at Agia Fotia cemetery near Sitia is housed in the first room. The room also contains many notable vases and several hundred bronze blades of differing shapes and level of sharpness also found in the graves of Agia Fotia. Fish hooks dating back to early Minoan Crete are also exhibited.

== Gallery of photos from the years 2005 and 2010 ==
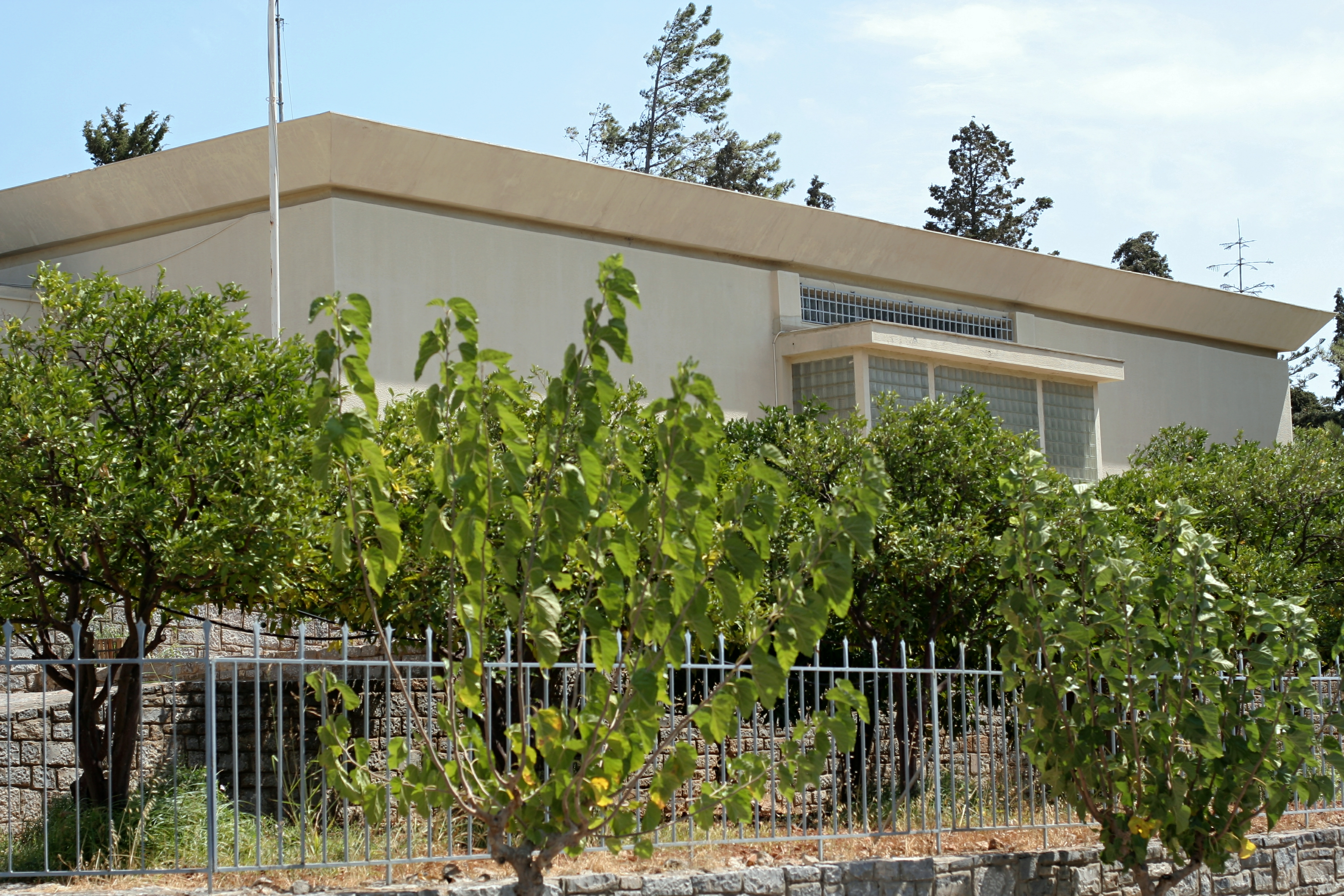
Building of the Museum

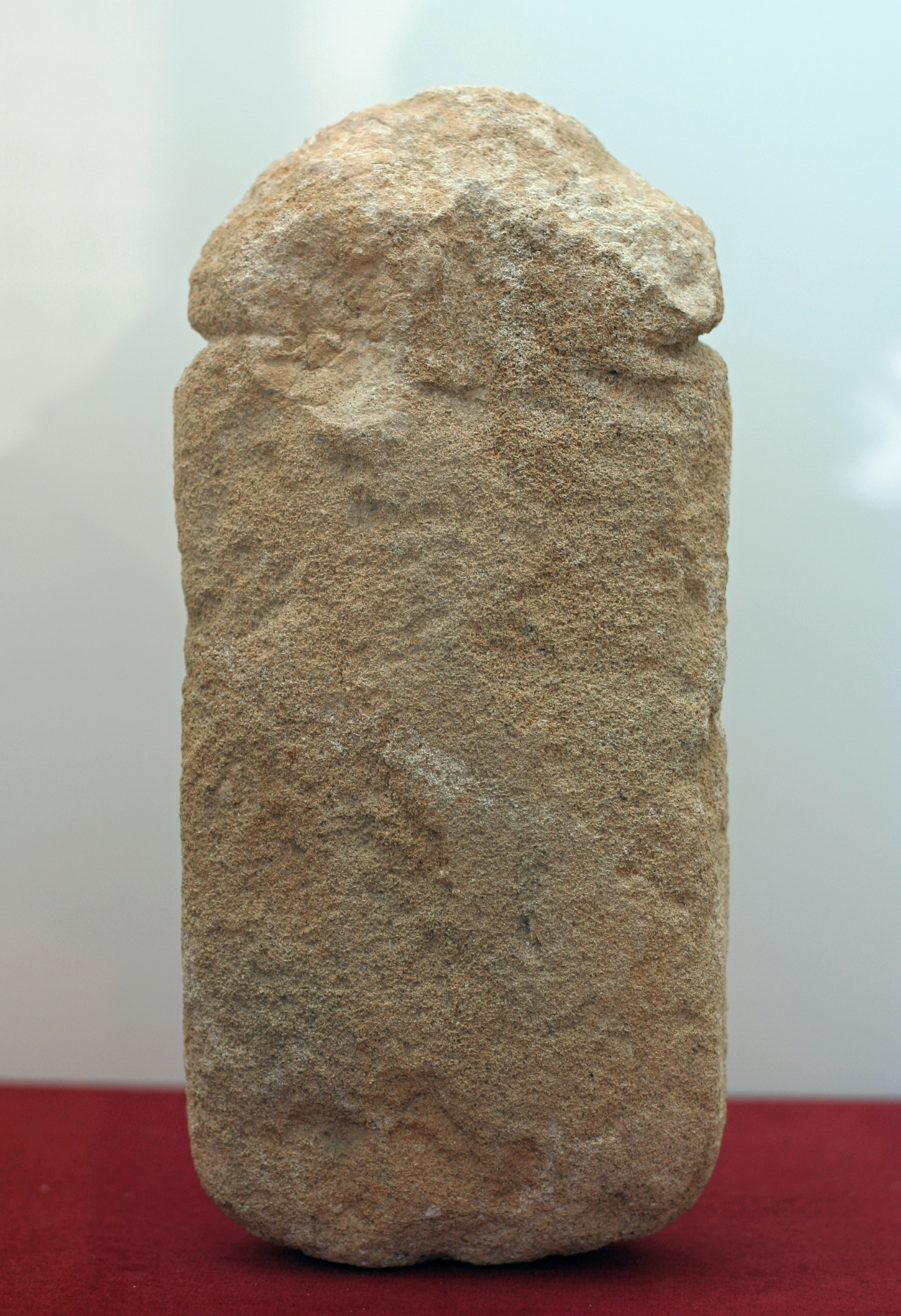
Ithyphalic stone, Palekita near Sitia, 3000 BC

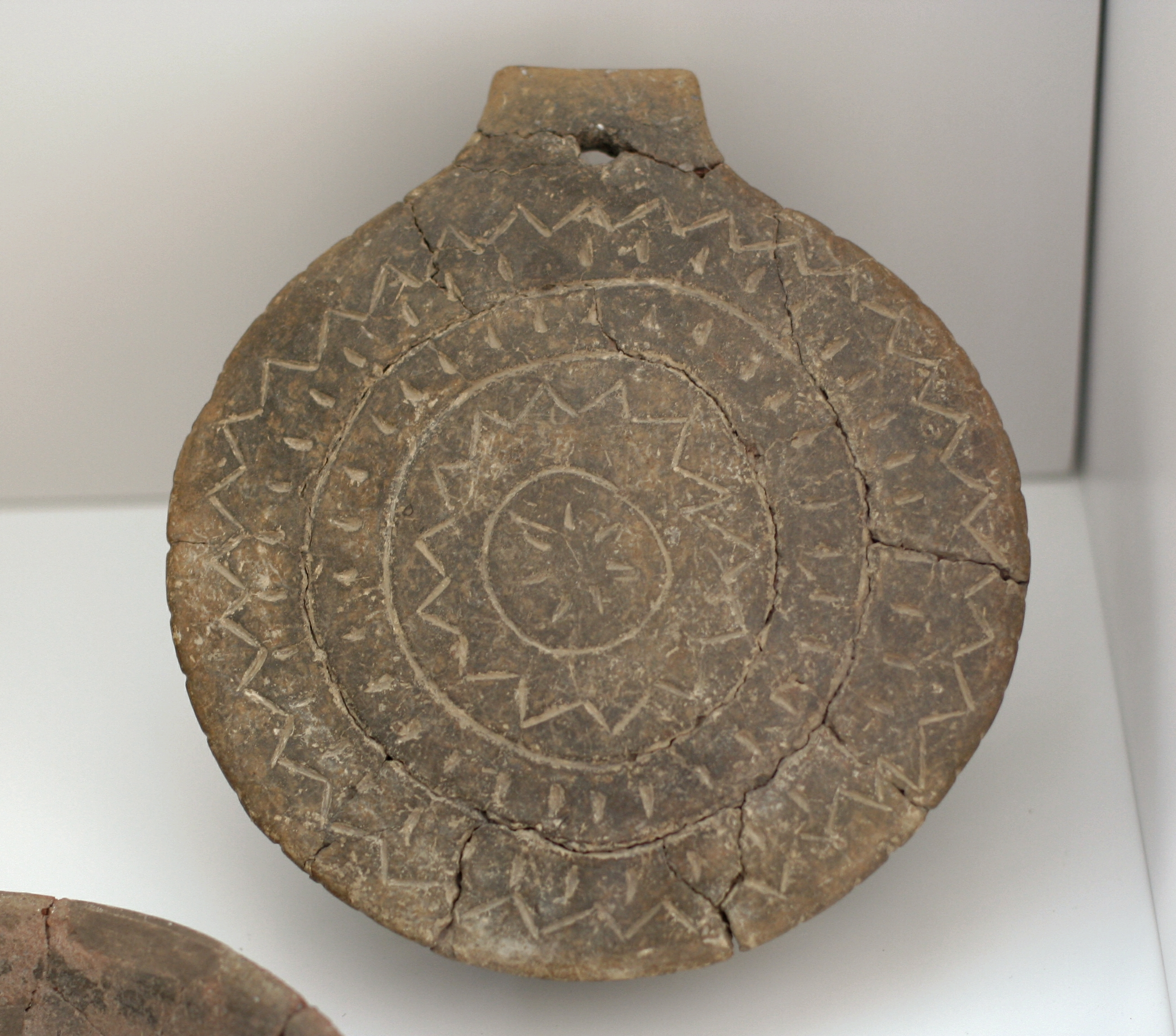
Cycladic type pottery, Agia Fotia near Sitia, 3000-2500 BC

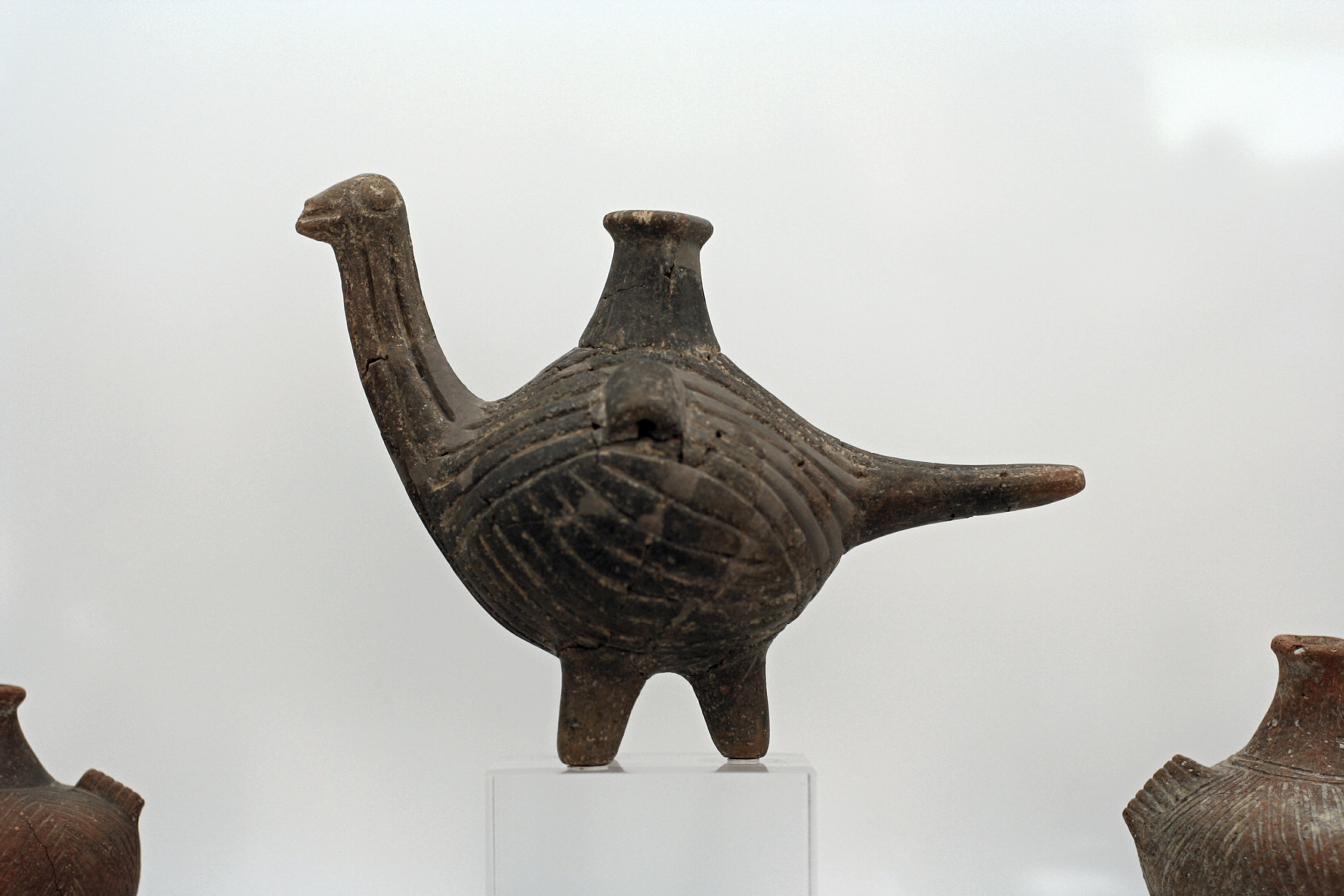
Early Minoan bird-shaped rhyton, Agia Fotia, 3000-2500 BC

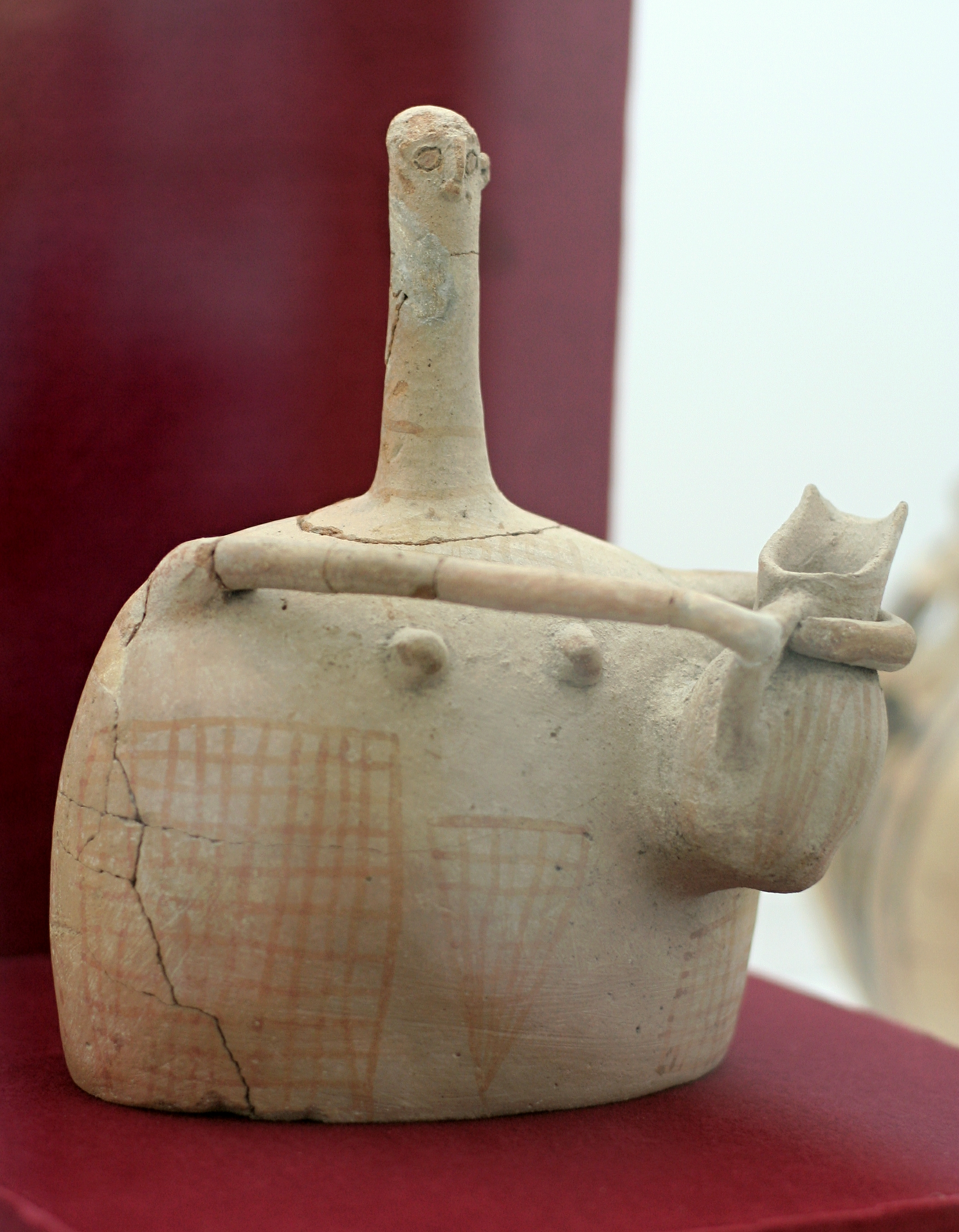
Goddess of Myrtos, Phournou Koryphi, 2500-2300 BC

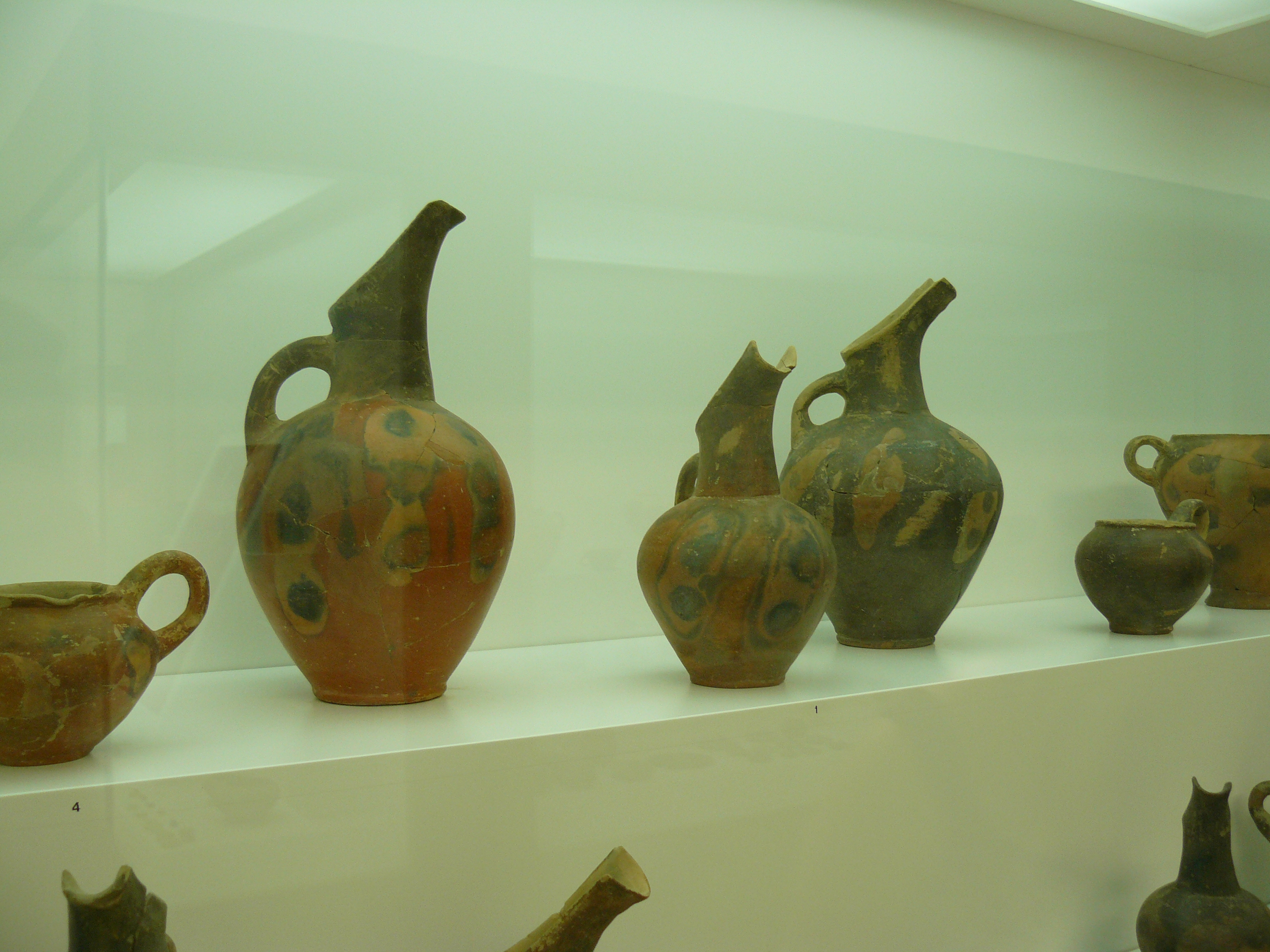
Vasiliki ware, Phournou Koryphi, 2500-2300 BC

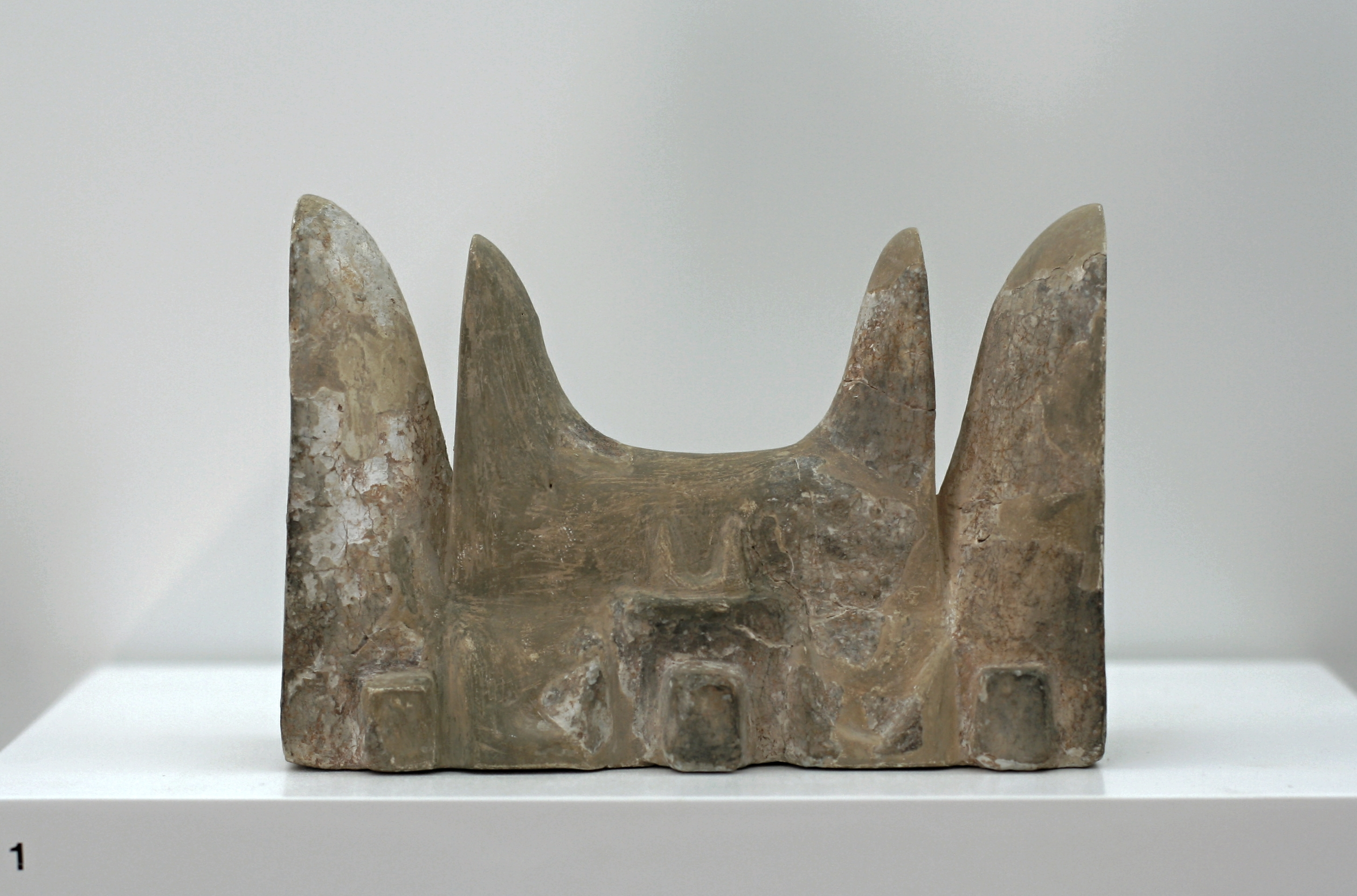
Horns of Consecration, Petsofas, 2000-1425 BC

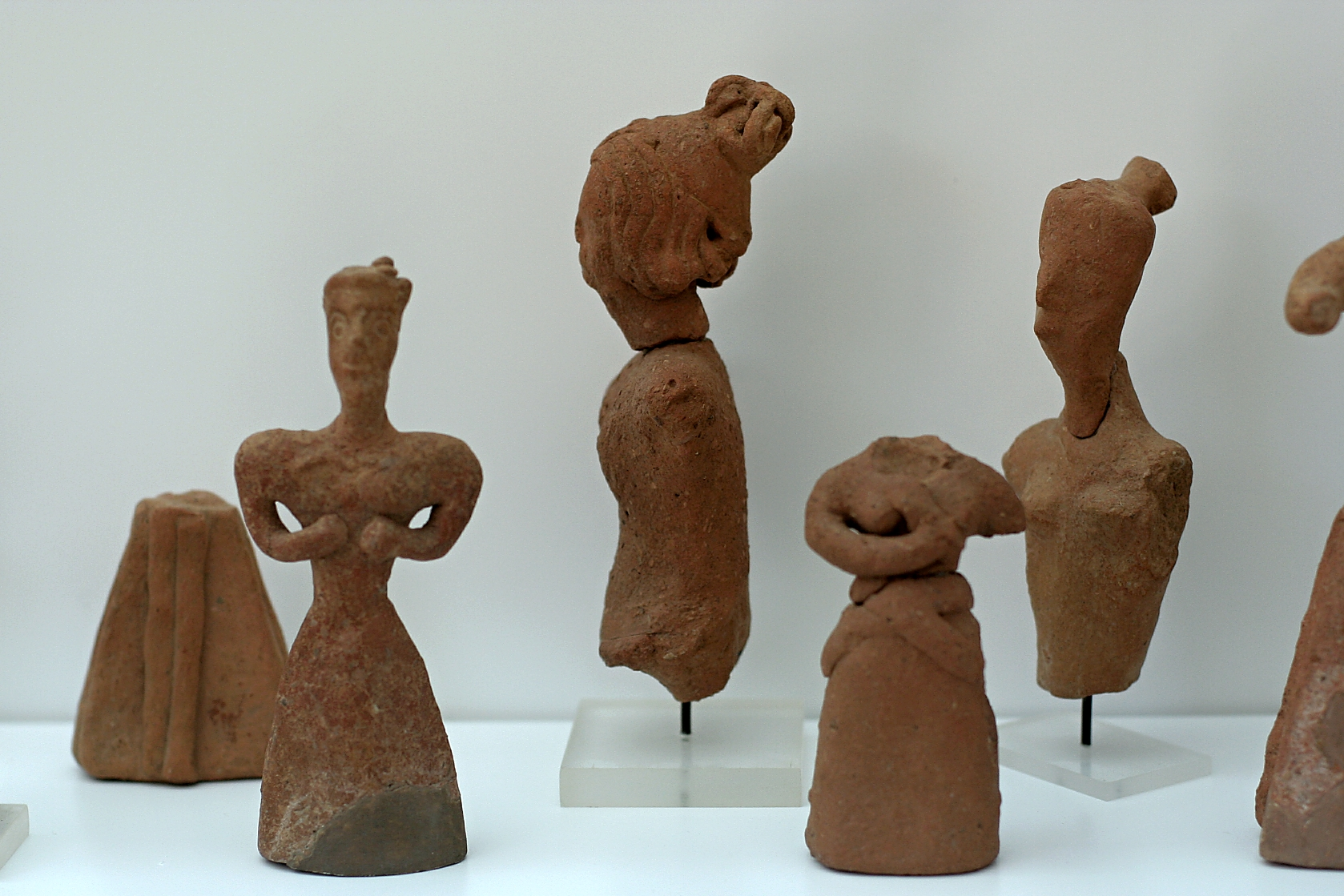
Minoan female figurines, Petsophas, 2000-1425 BC

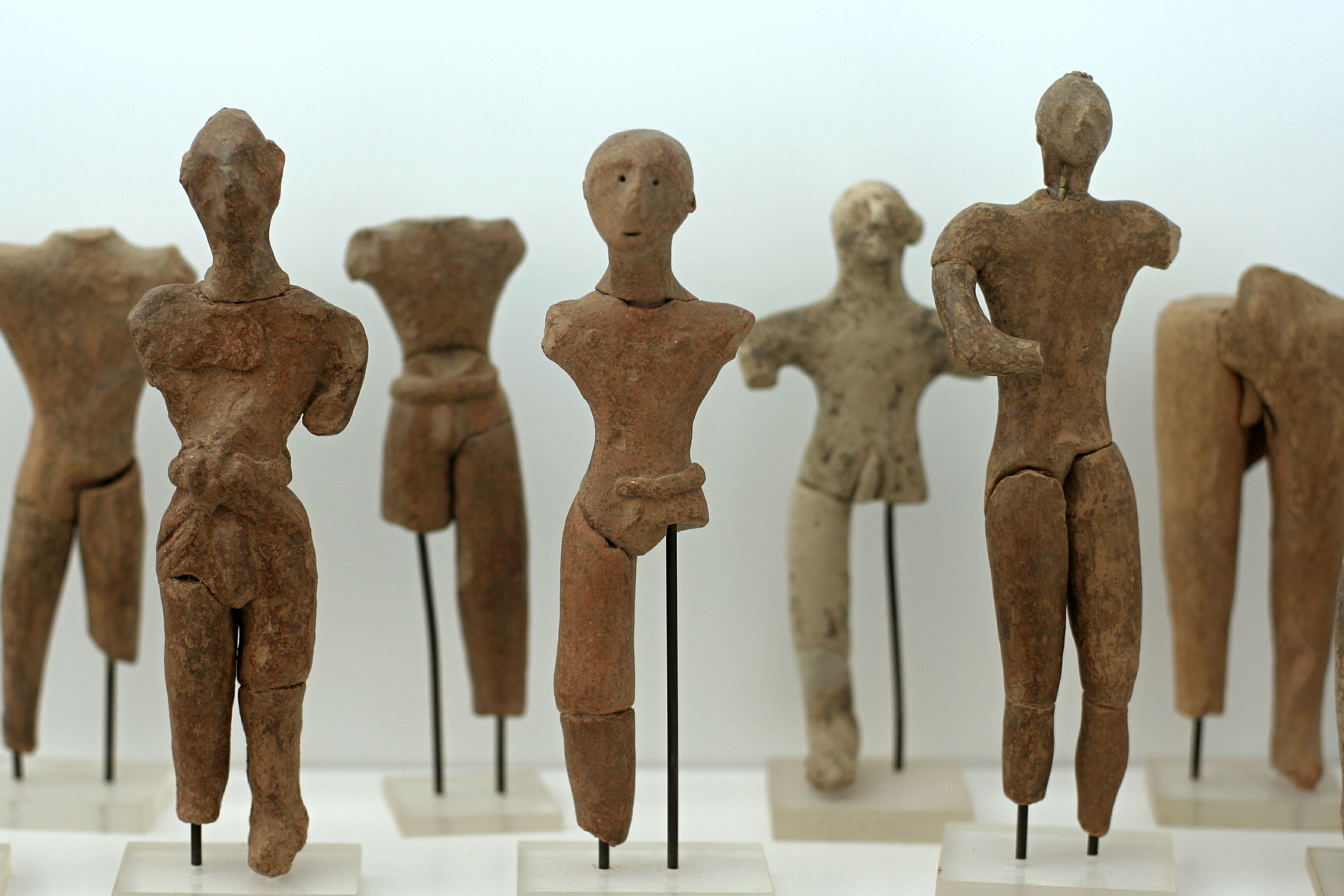
Minoan male figurines, Petsophas, 2000-1425 BC

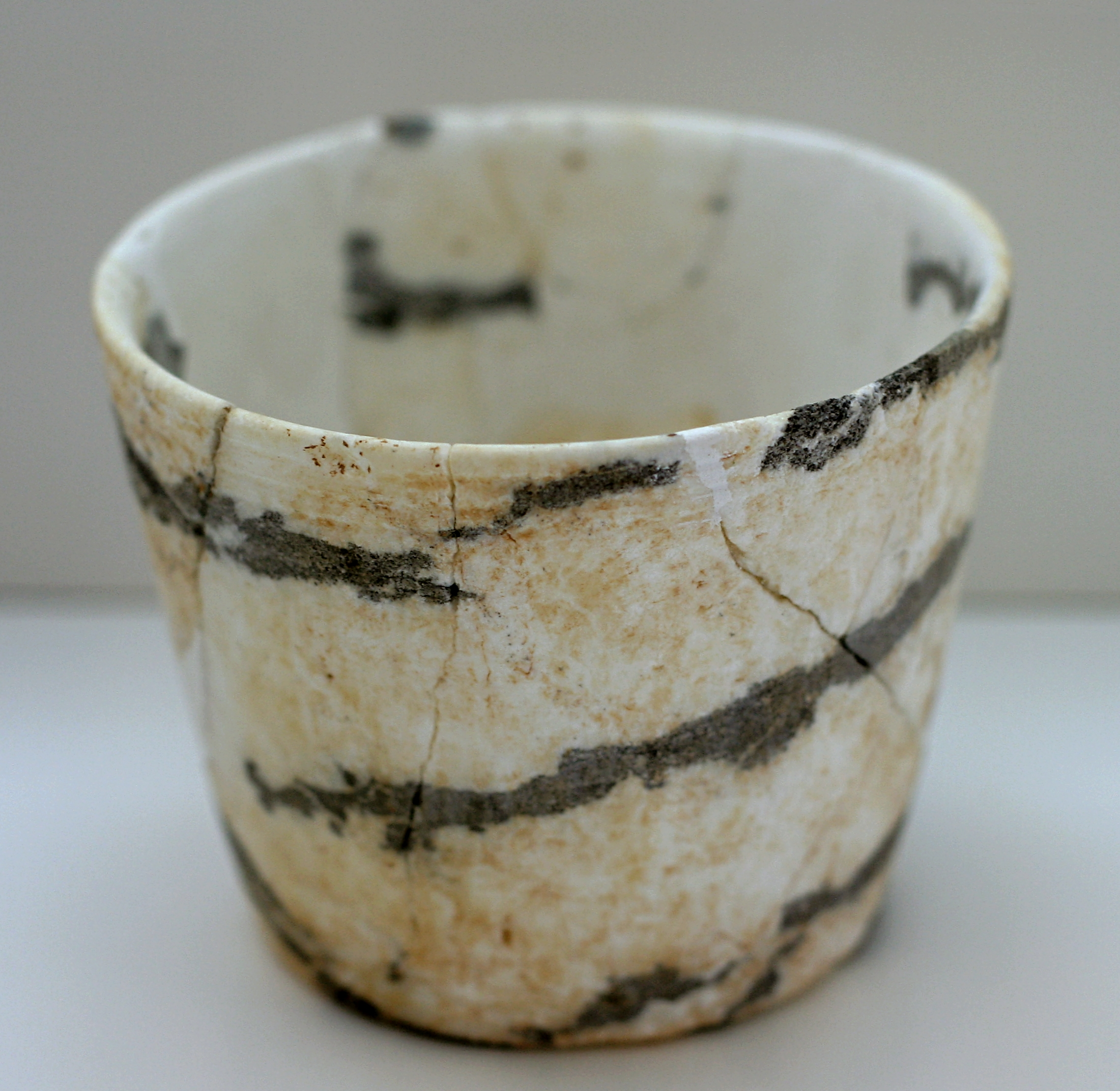
Minoan small stone vessel, Palace of Malia, 1800-1700 BC

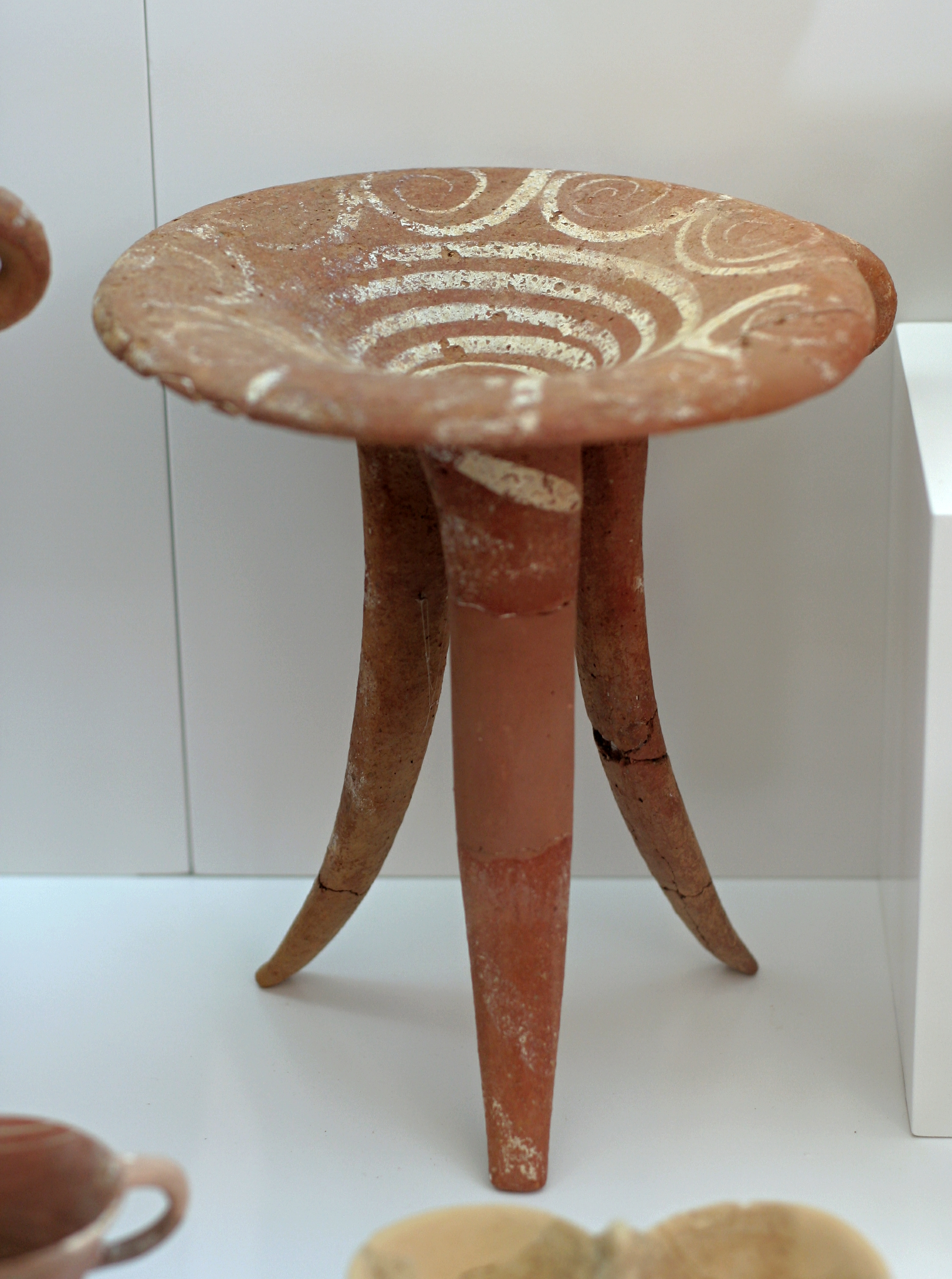
Minoan tripod, Palace of Malia, 1800-1700 BC

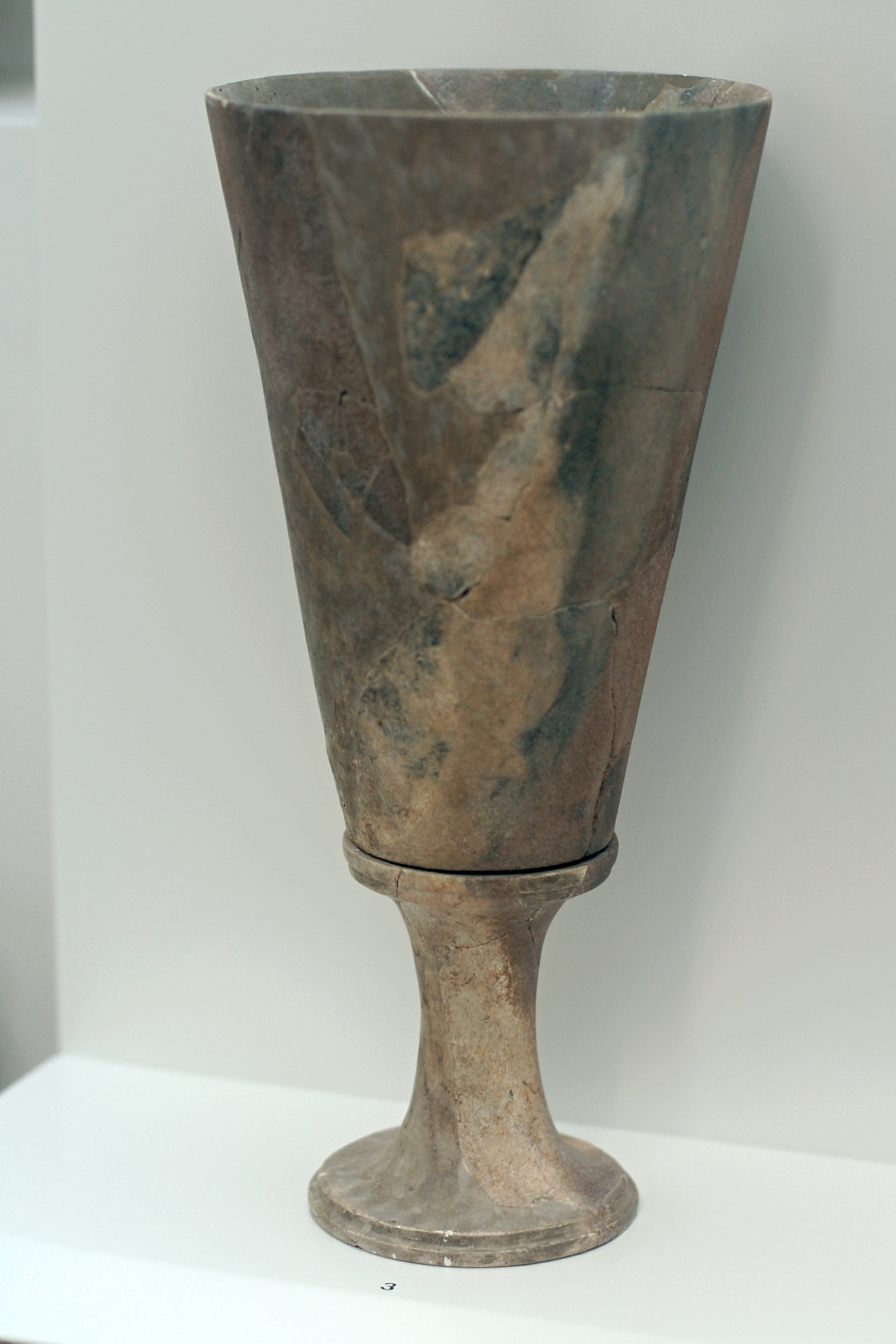
Ritual tall cup, Makrygialos, 1780-1425 BC

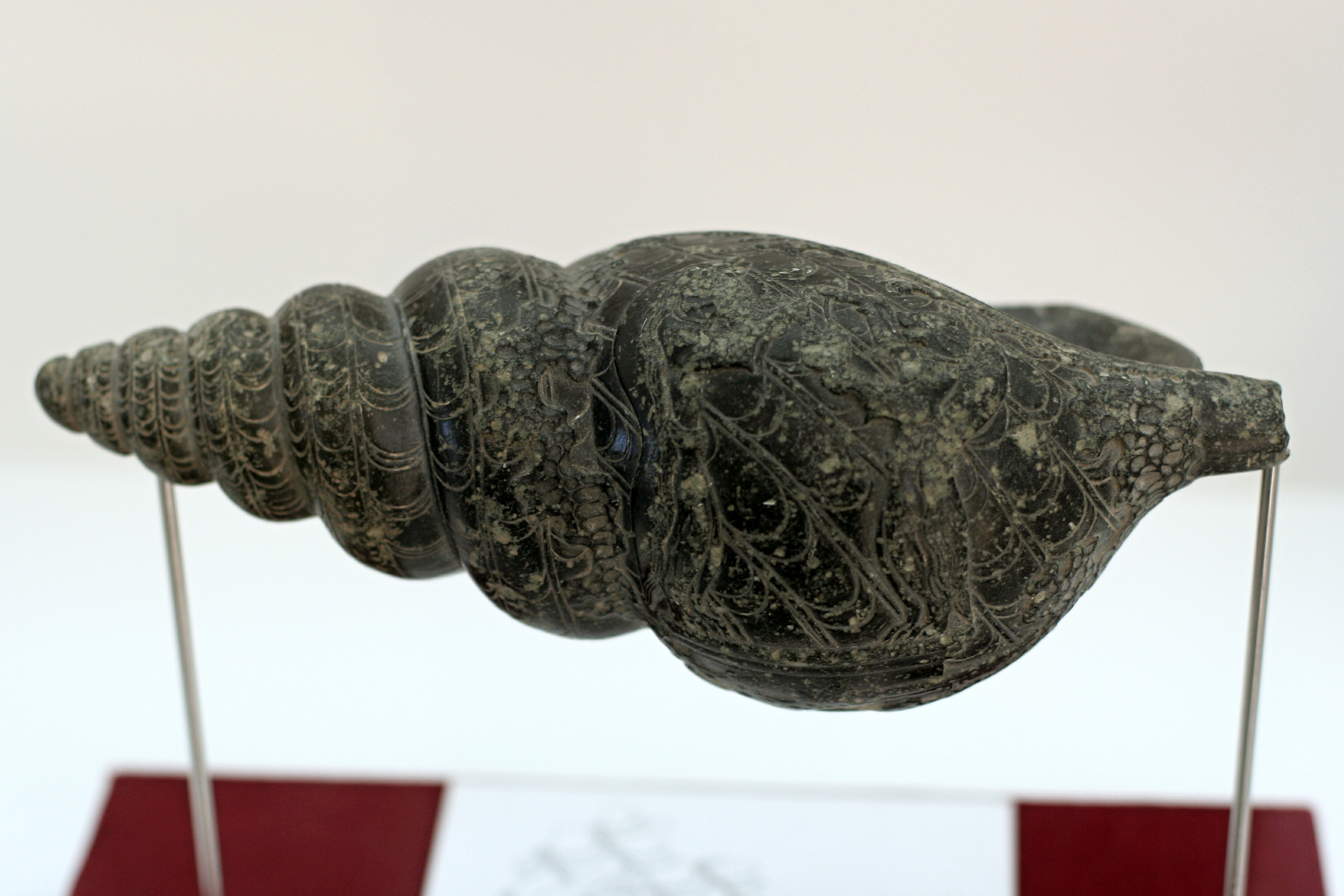
Triton-shaped stone rhyton with engraving, Malia, 1550-1500 BC

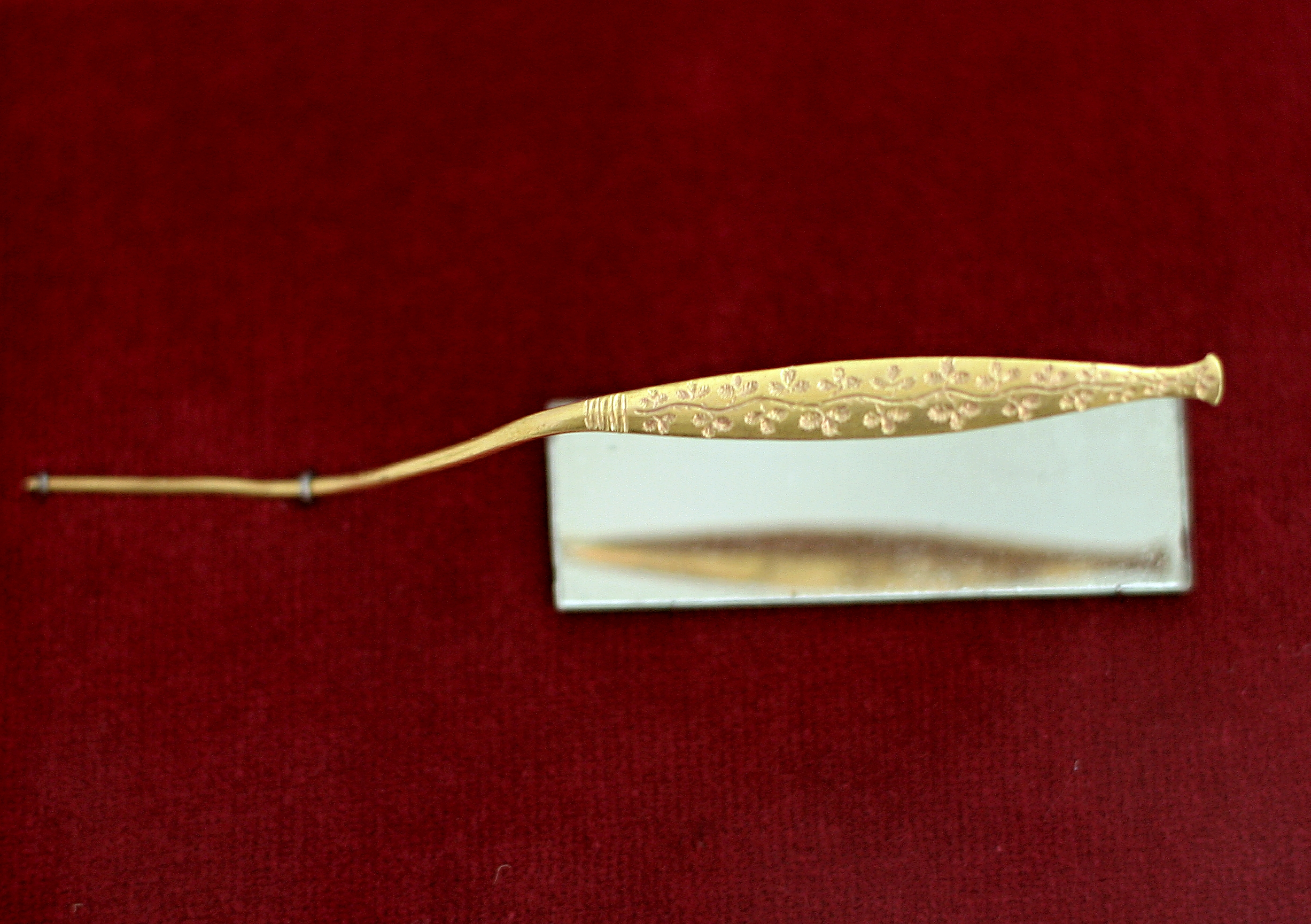
Gold needle, 1600-1425 BC

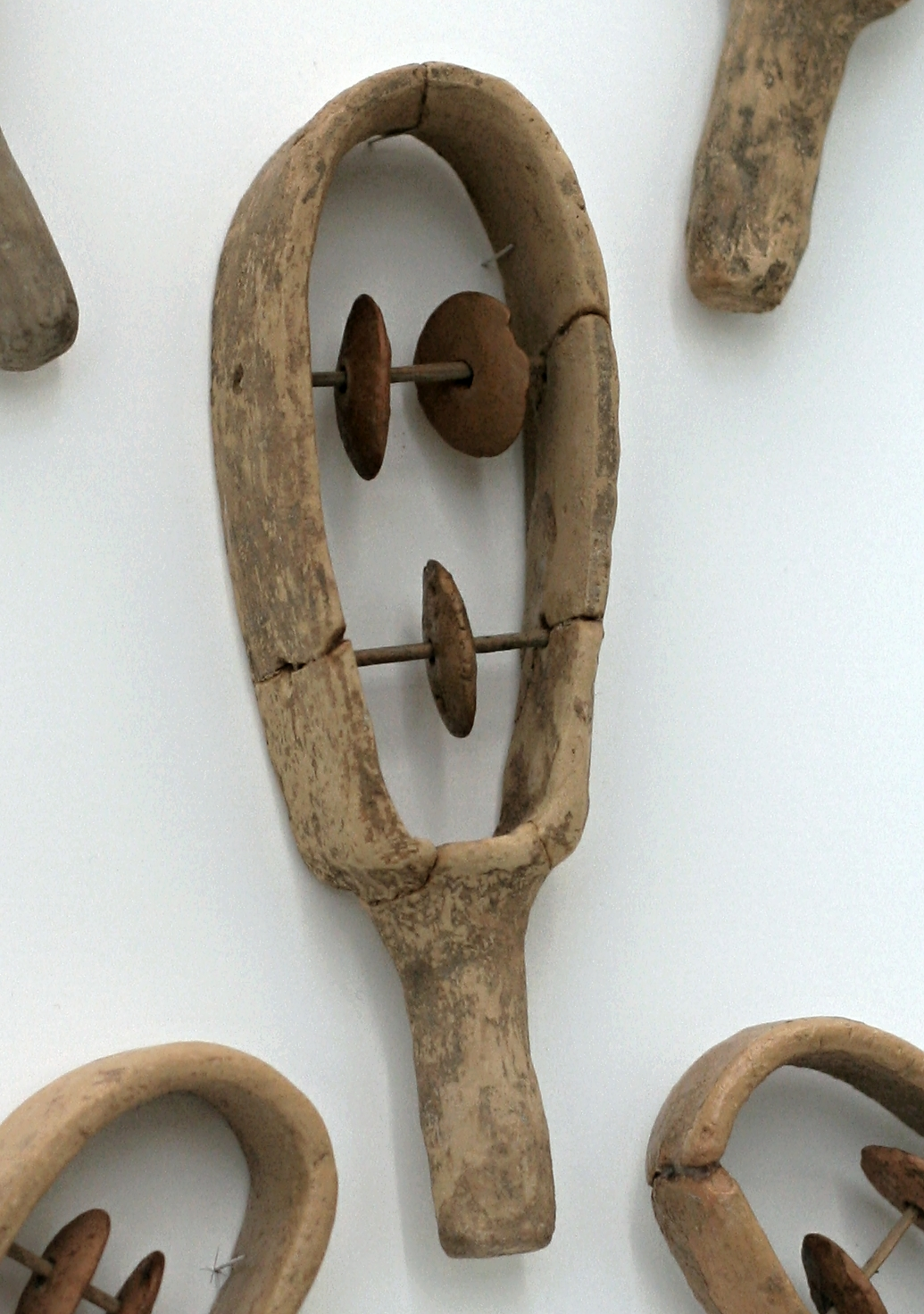
Clay sistrum, Ag. Charalambos cave, 1800-1050 BC

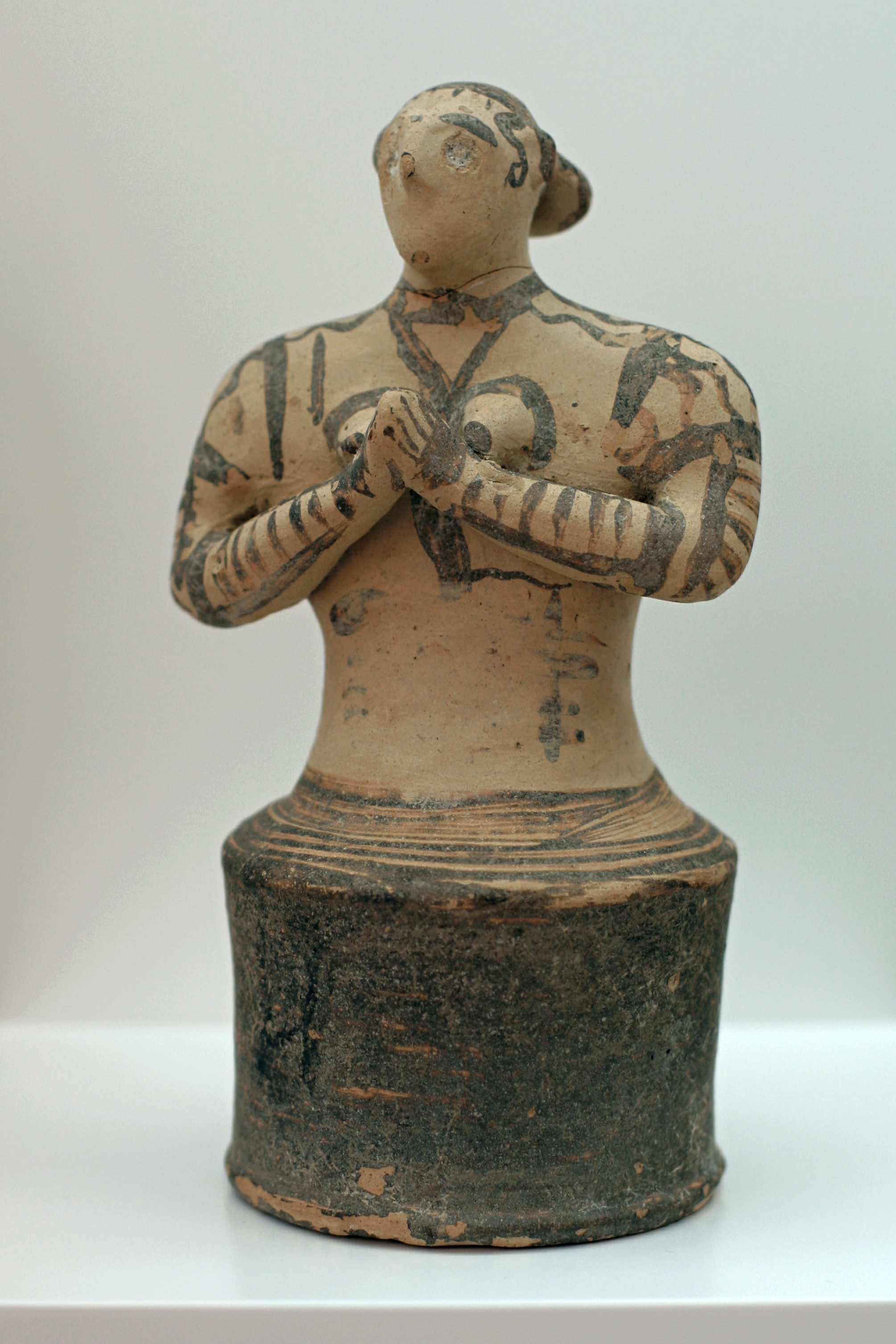
Goddess or priestess, Myrsini near Sitia, 1450-1100 BC

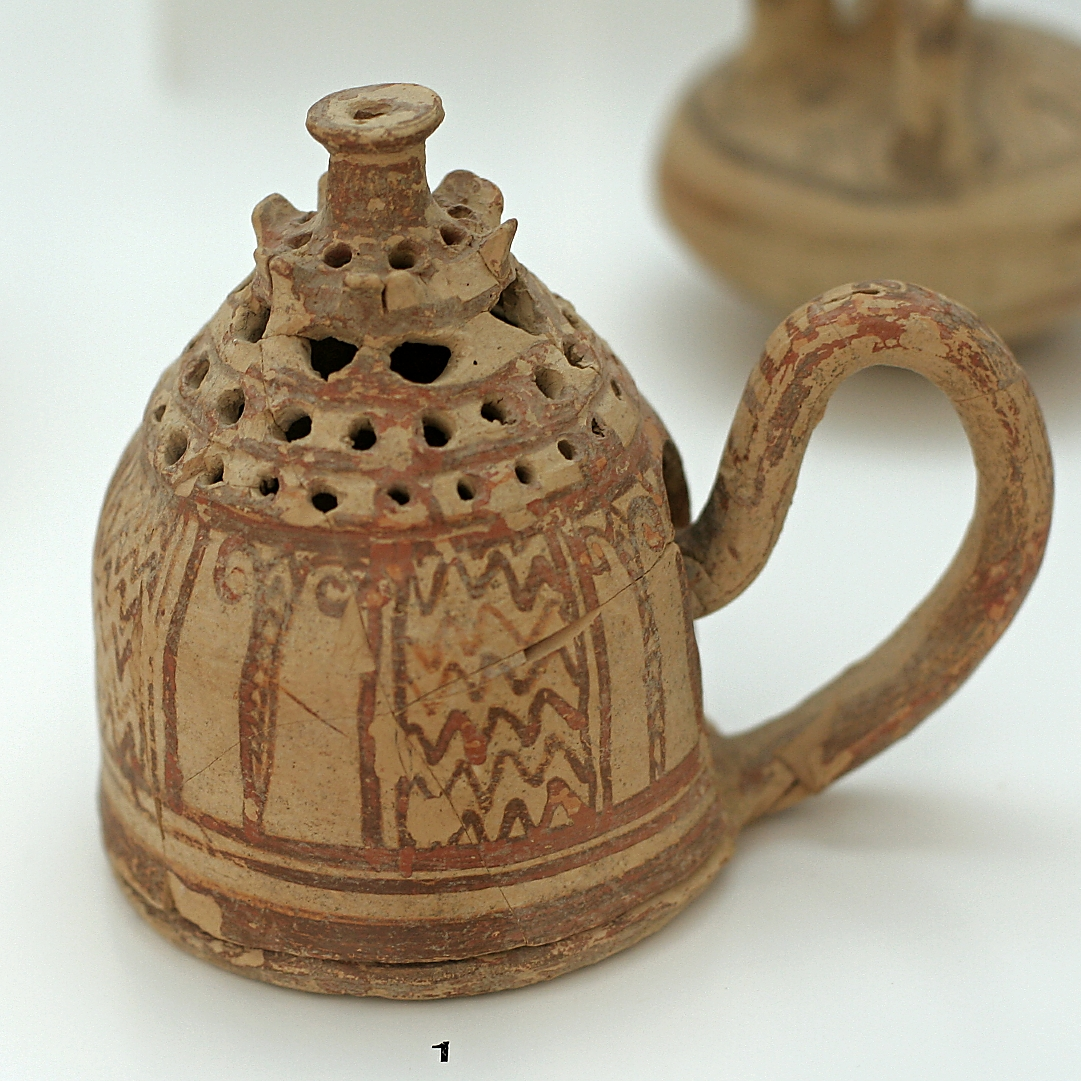
Clay censer (Thymiaterion), Gralygia near Ierapetra, 1400-1200 BC

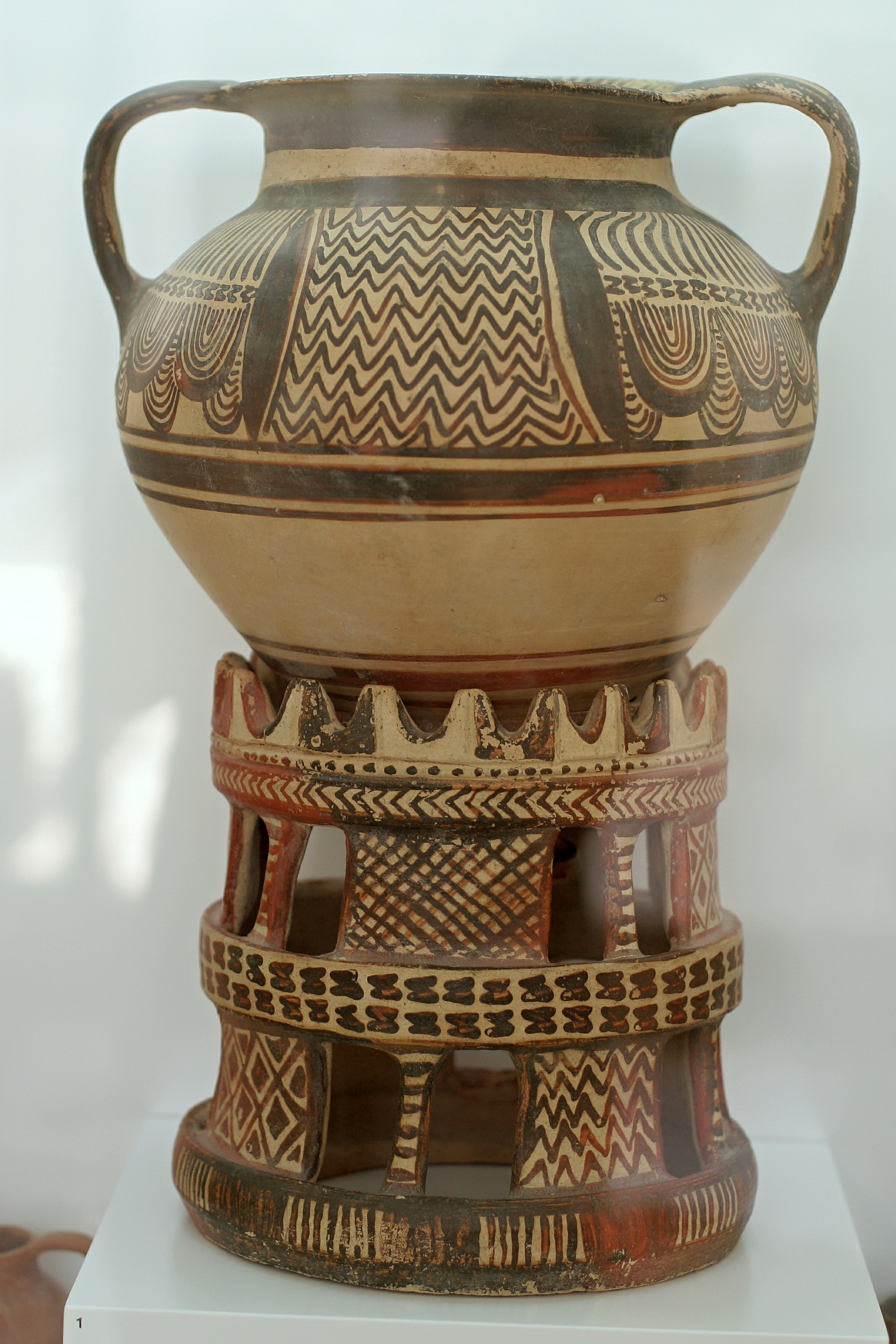
Pottery for water at the ceremony, 1350-1300 BC

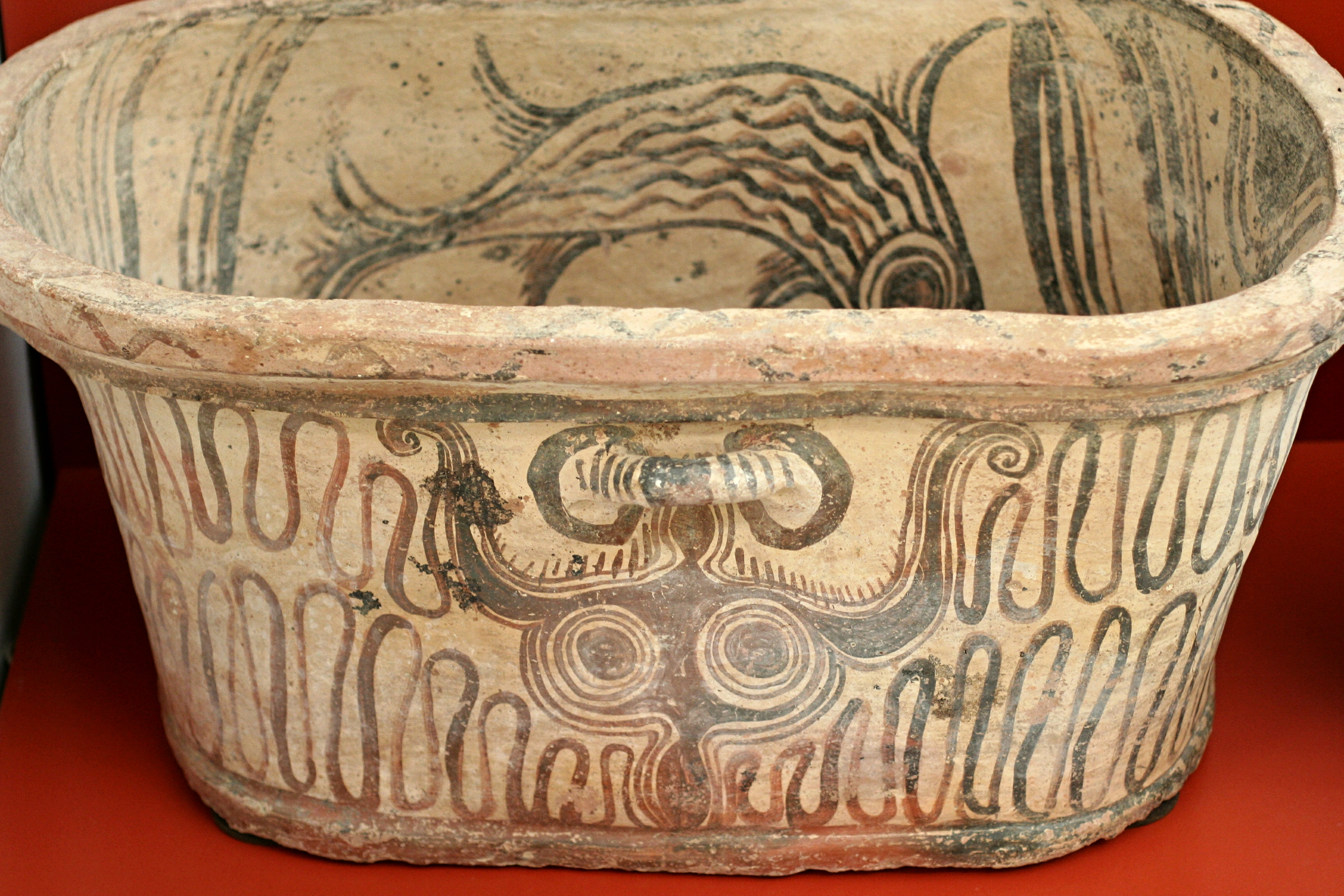
Late Minoan Larnax no 262, Sitia, 1440-1050 BC

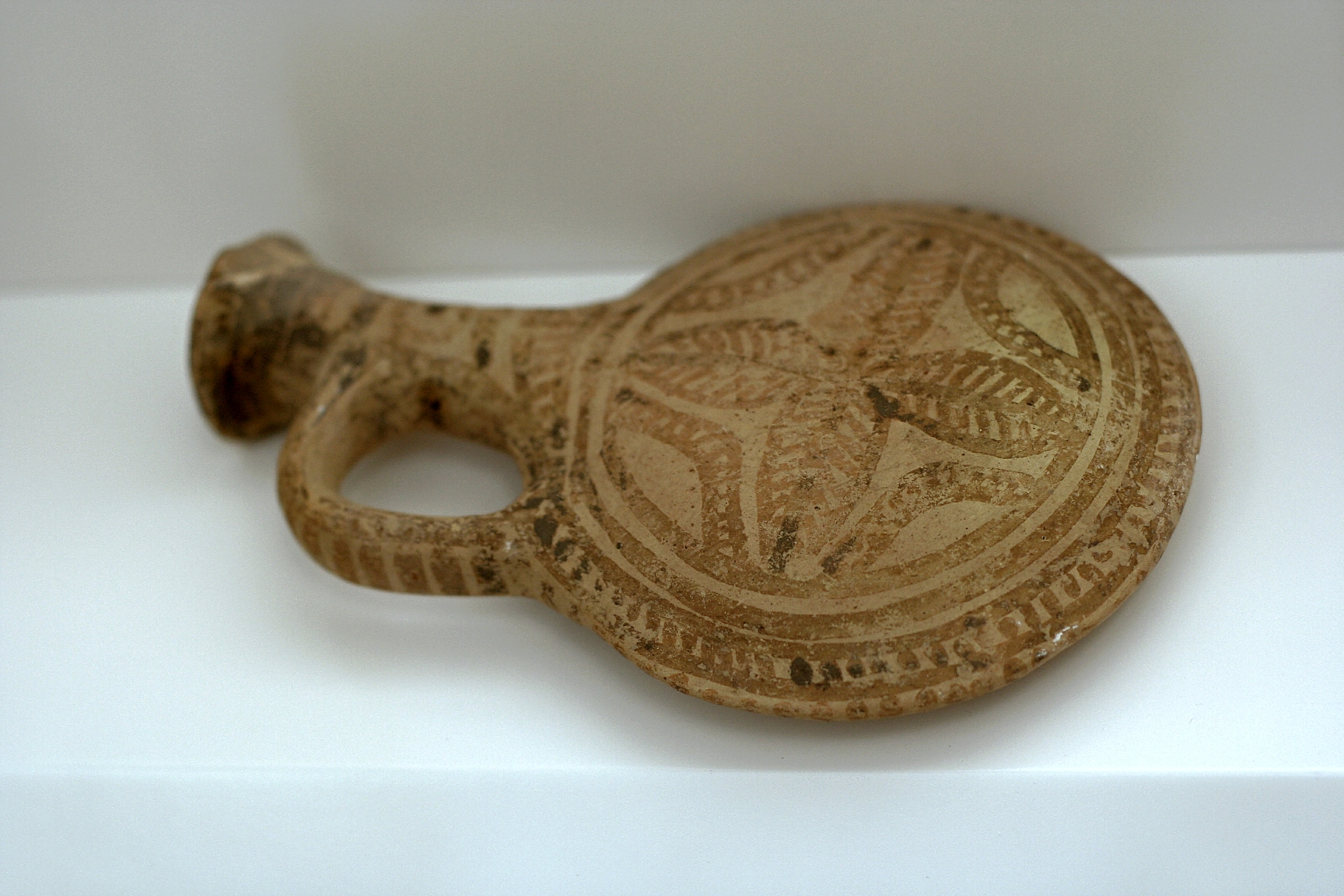
Ancient Greek flask, geometric style, 750-725 BC

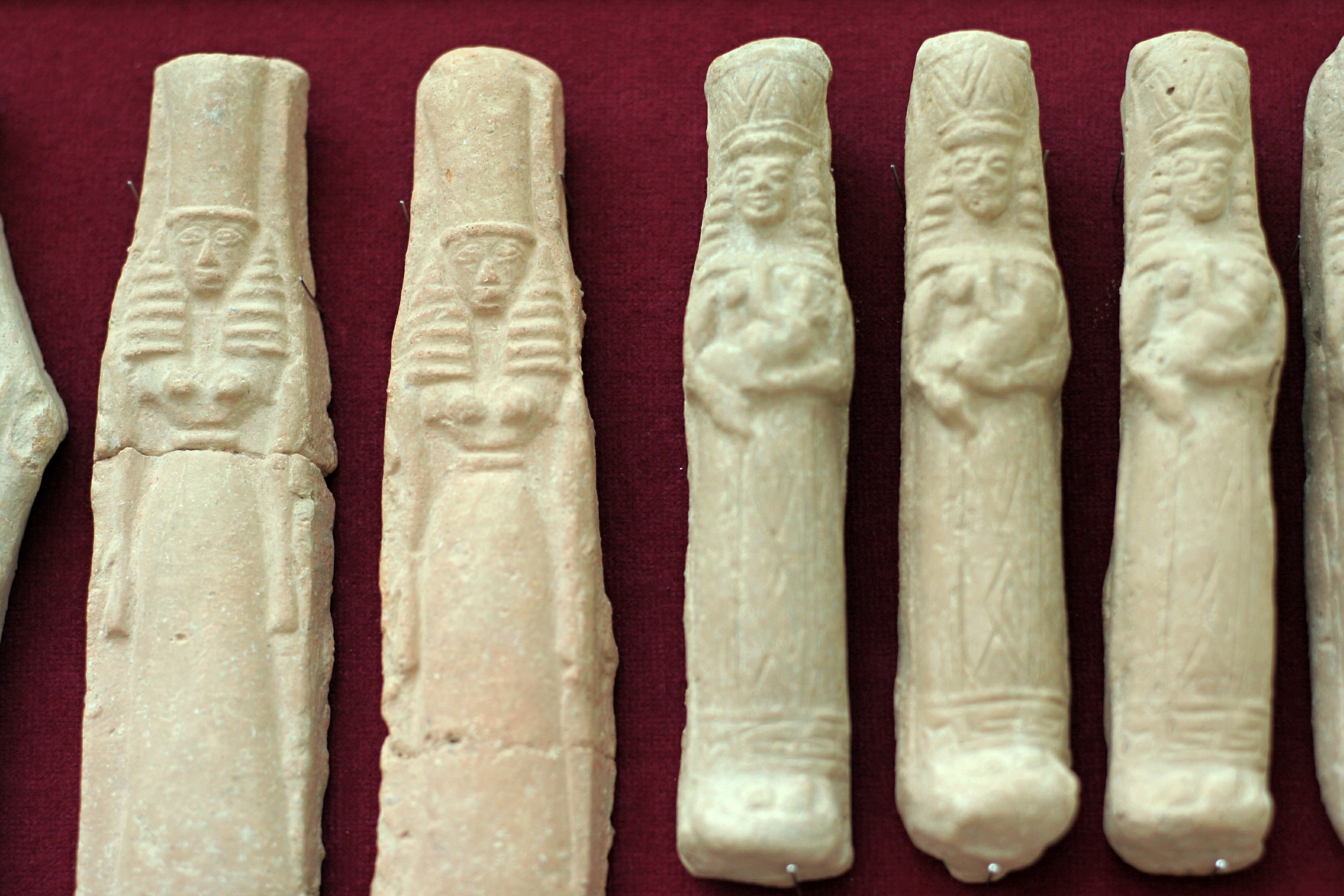
Small Goddesses, Greek archaic period

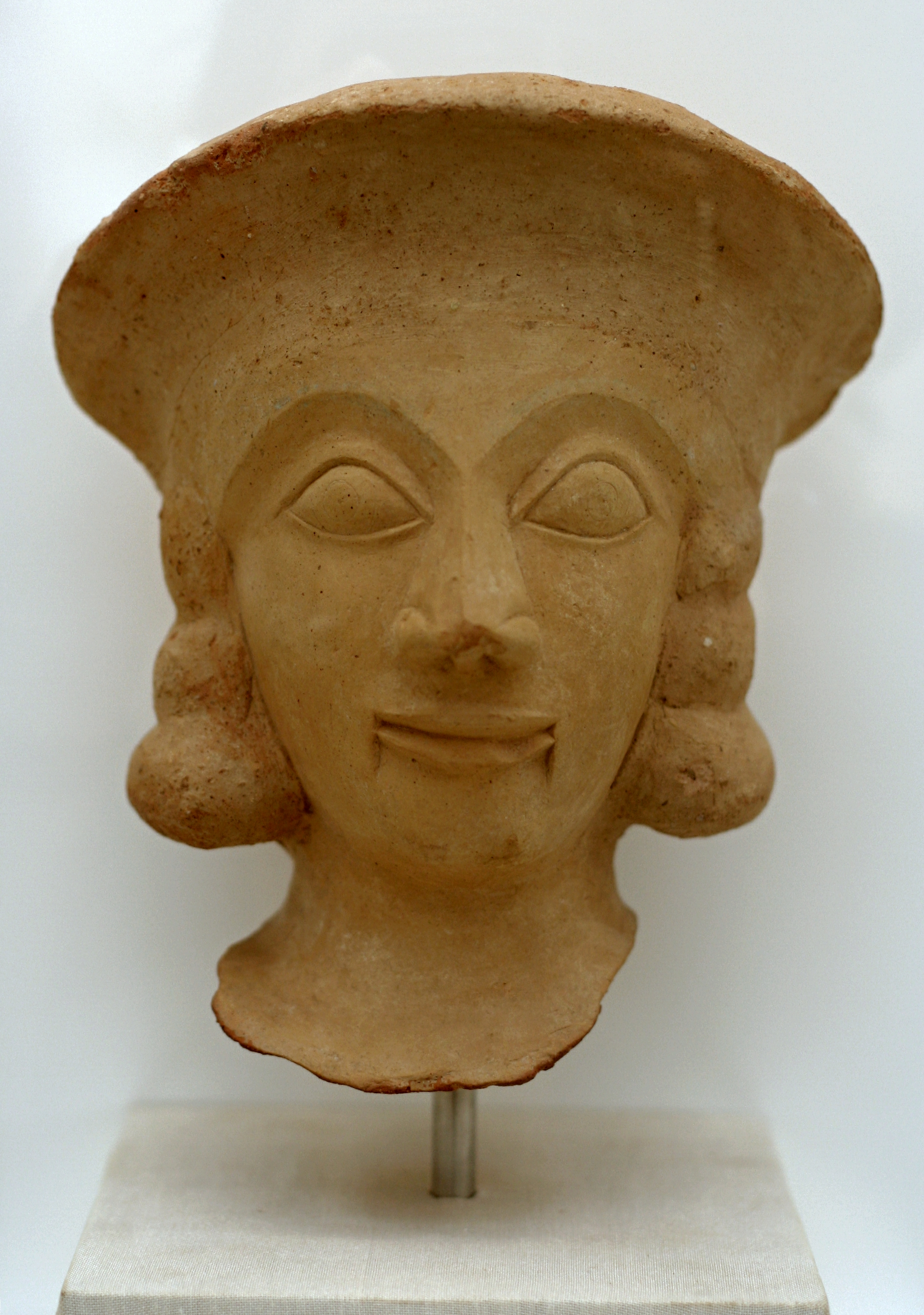
Head of a larger clay statue, Daedalic style, 700-550 BC

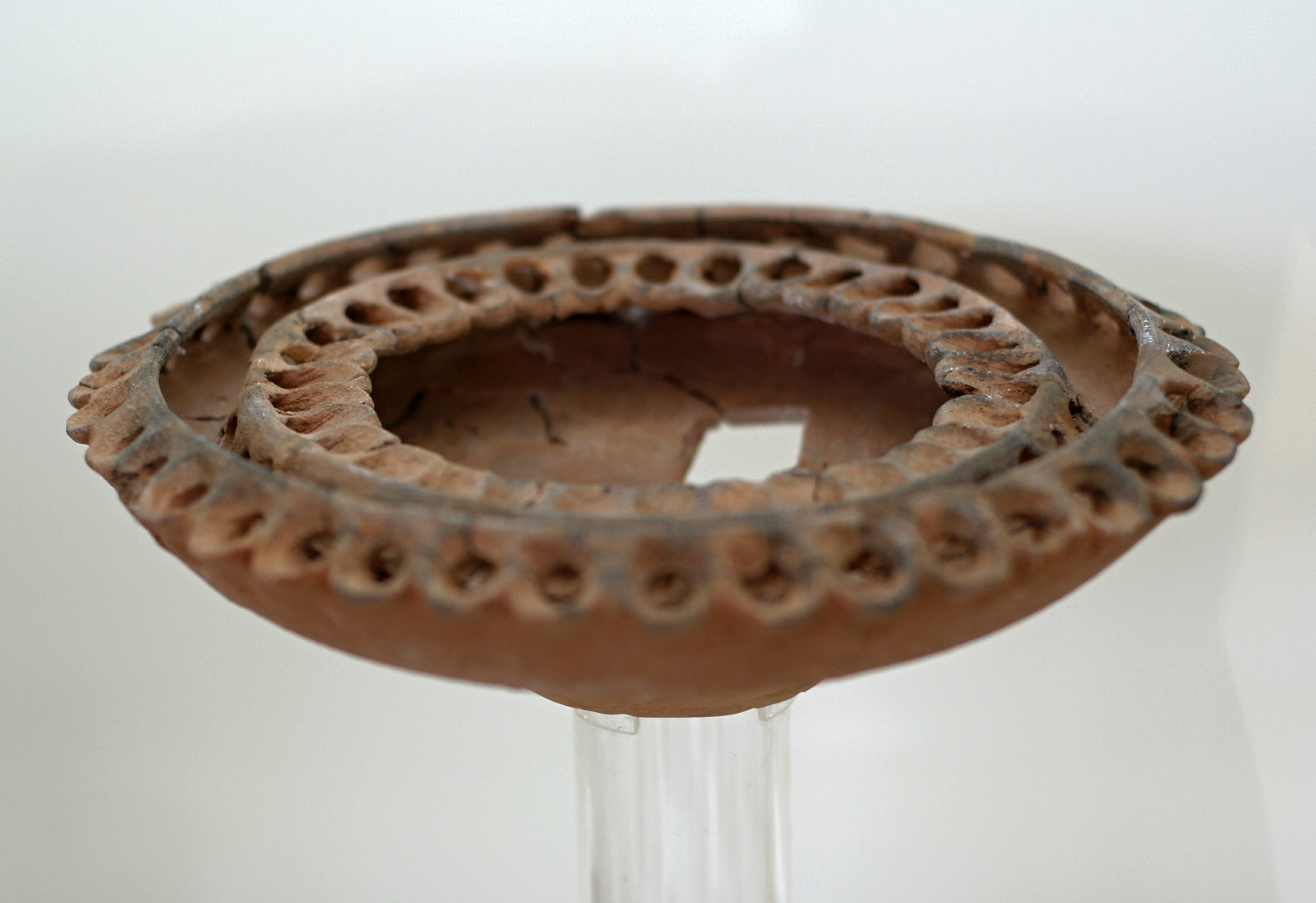
Multiple lamp, clay, Olous (Elounda), 700-400 BC

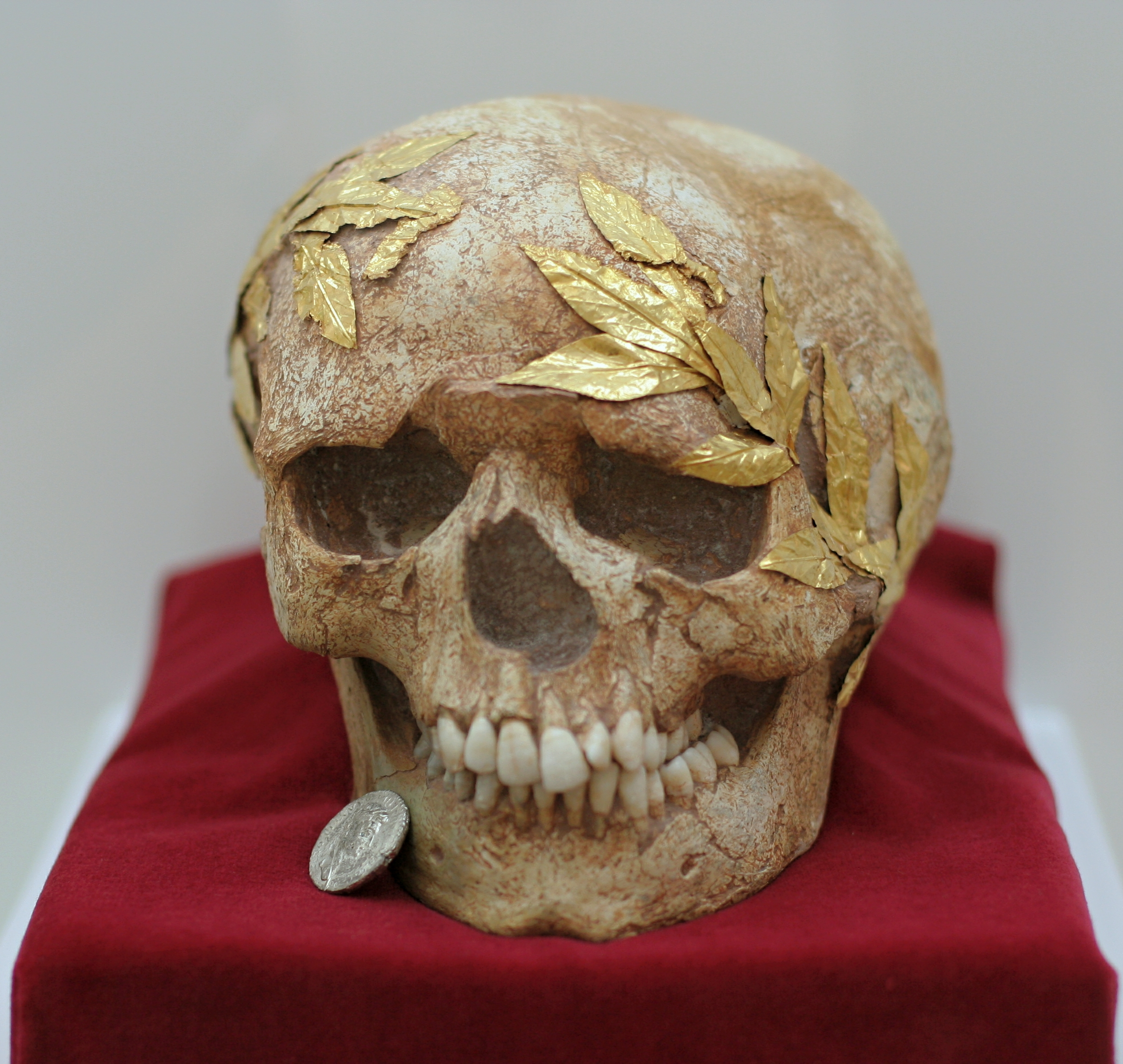
Skull of athlete with coin for Charon, Ag. Nikolaos, 1st century AD
