= Stavropolsky =

Stavropolsky (masculine), Stavropolskaya (feminine), or Stavropolskoye (neuter) may refer to:

- Stavropol Krai (Stavropolsky kray), a federal subject of Russia
- Stavropolsky District, a district of Samara Oblast, Russia
- Stavropolsky, Russia, a rural locality (a settlement) in Stavropol Krai, Russia
- Stavropolskaya, a rural locality (a stanitsa) in Krasnodar Krai, Russia

== See also ==
- Stavropol (disambiguation)
