= Stavropoulos =

Stavropoulos (Greek: Σταυρόπουλος), feminine Stavropoulou (Greek: Σταυρόπουλου) is a Greek surname which – in its Latinized form – can also be found in the Greek diaspora. It is a patronymic derived from the personal name Stavros by adding the patronymic ending -poulos (from Latin pullus meaning "nestling", "chick"). Notable people with this name include:

- Dimitrios Stavropoulos, Greek footballer
- George Stavropoulos (1920–1990), American fashion designer
- Ilias Stavropoulos (born 1995), Greek football right winger
- Nikos Stavropoulos (born 1959), Greek professional basketball player
- Theo Stavropoulos (1930–2007), Greek American painter
