= Stavrochori, Lasithi =

Stavrochori Σταυροχώρι
- Community
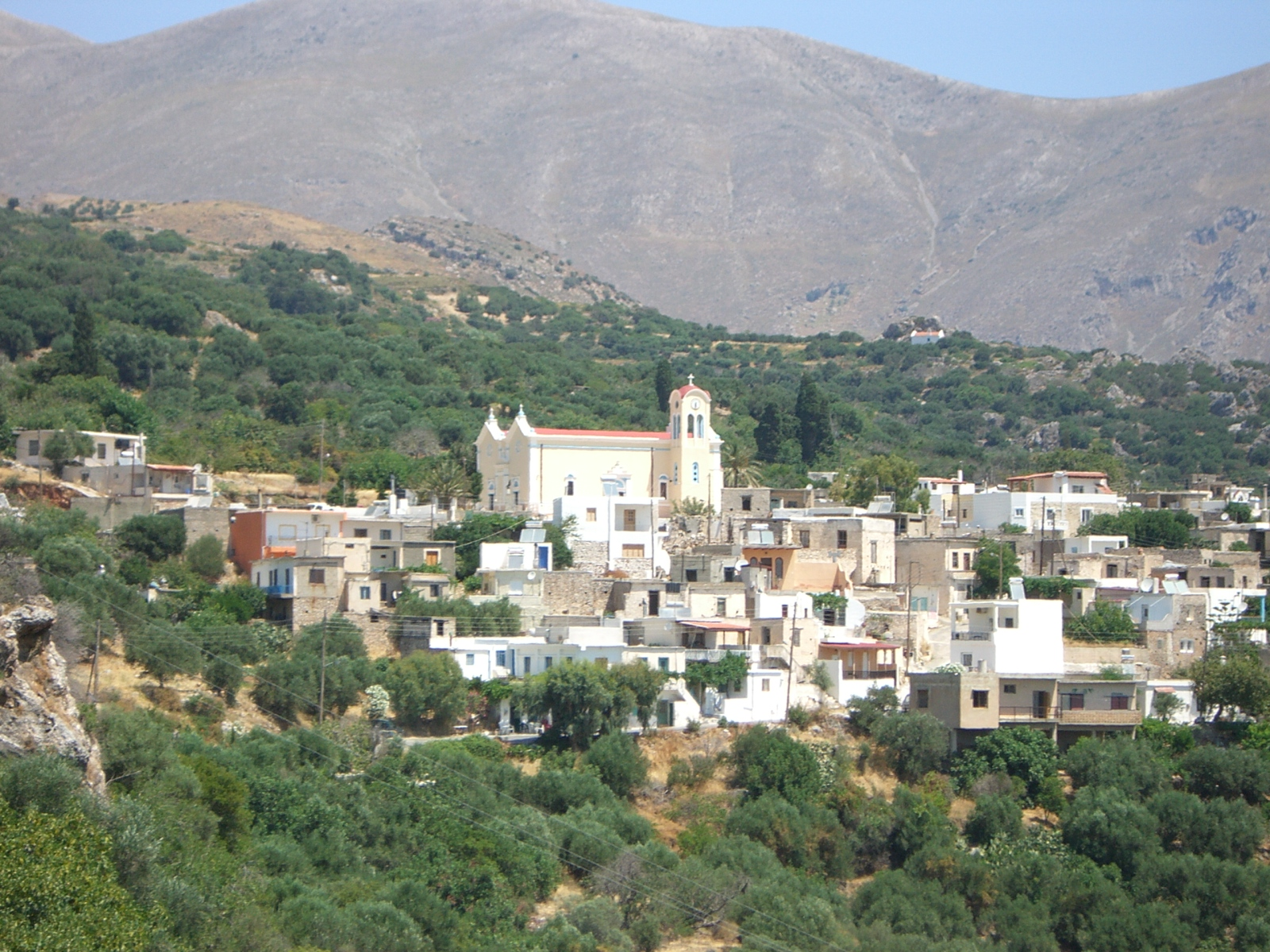

- Location within Greece
- Coordinates: 35°04′41″N 25°56′31″E
- Country: Greece
- Administrative region: Crete
- Regional unit: Lasithi
- Municipality: Ierapetra
- Municipal unit: Makry Gialos

Population (2021)
  - Community: 879
- Time zone: UTC+2 (EET)
  - Summer (DST): UTC+3 (EEST)

Stavrochori (Greek: Σταυροχώρι) is an historic village of eastern Crete. It belonged to the former province of Sitia and later to the former Makry Gialos municipality. Today it is part of Ierapetra municipality. It is located in a wooded valley, 29 kilometers north east from Ierapetra and 35 kilometers southwest from Sitia. Once it was the most populous village of the region and the administrative center of the surrounding settlements. Since the last 30 years, the majority of its population has moved to the seaside settlement of Koutsouras, 7 kilometers to the south. Stavrochori is a traditional village with many sights. It is also the birthplace of Ioannis Papachatzakis or "Stravogiannios", a violinist, who lived and died in Ierapetra. He was one of the most important Cretan traditional organ players of the last century.
