= Schinokapsala =

Human settlement in Greece

Schinokapsala Σχινοκάψαλα
- Community
- Location within Greece
- Coordinates: 35°03′11″N 25°52′59″E
- Country: Greece
- Administrative region: Crete
- Regional unit: Lasithi
- Municipality: Ierapetra
- Municipal unit: Makry Gialos

Population (2021)
  - Community: 496
- Time zone: UTC+2 (EET)
  - Summer (DST): UTC+3 (EEST)

Schinokapsala (Greek: Σχινοκάψαλα) is a community and a small village in Lasithi on Crete. It is situated 21 kilometers north-east from Ierapetra and 6 km from the sea. Since 2011 it belongs to the Ierapetra municipality.

It is built 400 meters above sea level, south of Thripti mountain, in a verdant area, full of pine and olive trees. The community of Schinokapsala consists of Schinokapsala proper and the seaside settlements Galini, Achlia, and Mavros Kolympos. Today it is almost deserted, with a population of 80 people recorded in the 2021 census. A majority of the population have moved to the beach and to Ierapetra in the last 3 decades.

The Venetian census of 1583 recorded 162 in Schinokapsala, with the name derived from the Greek word for the Kermes oak that sheltered the original settlers while they lived in caves.
