= Koutsouras =

Village in Crete, Greece

Coordinates: 35°2′23″N 25°57′15″E

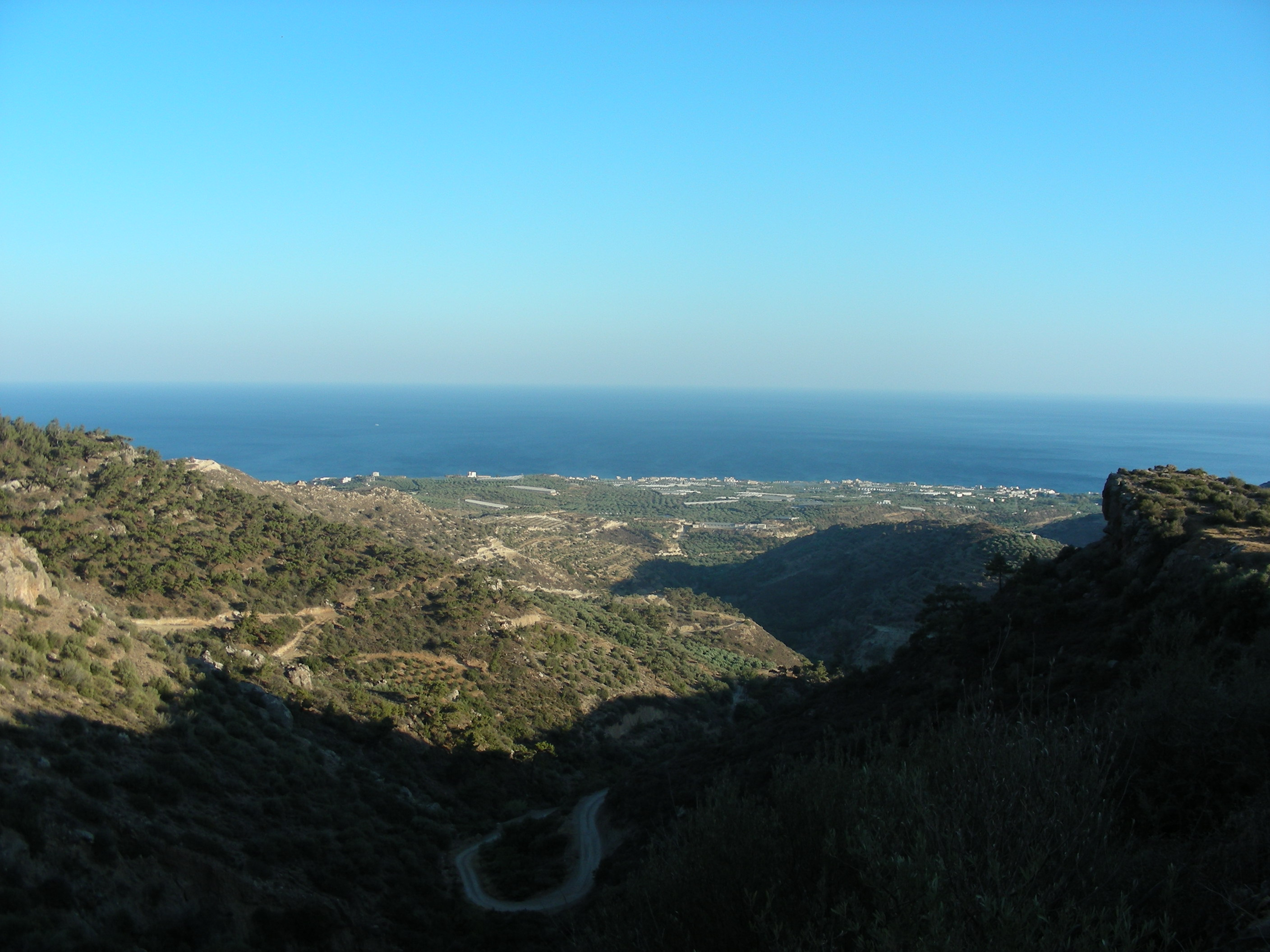
view of Koutsouras

Koutsouras (Κουτσουράς) is a village in Lasithi regional unit, in Crete, Greece 22 kilometers east of Ierapetra. Its population is 818 (2001 est.). It was the headquarters of the municipality of Makry Gialos (Dimos Makry Gialou) and is the biggest village in the region. Key economic activities include agriculture and tourism. The coast is rocky and there are pebble beaches with crystal clear waters. Today it is the seat of Makry Gialos municipal unit and part of Ierapetra municipality.
