= Karydi, Itanos =

Village in eastern Crete, Greece

Karydi Καρύδι
- Community
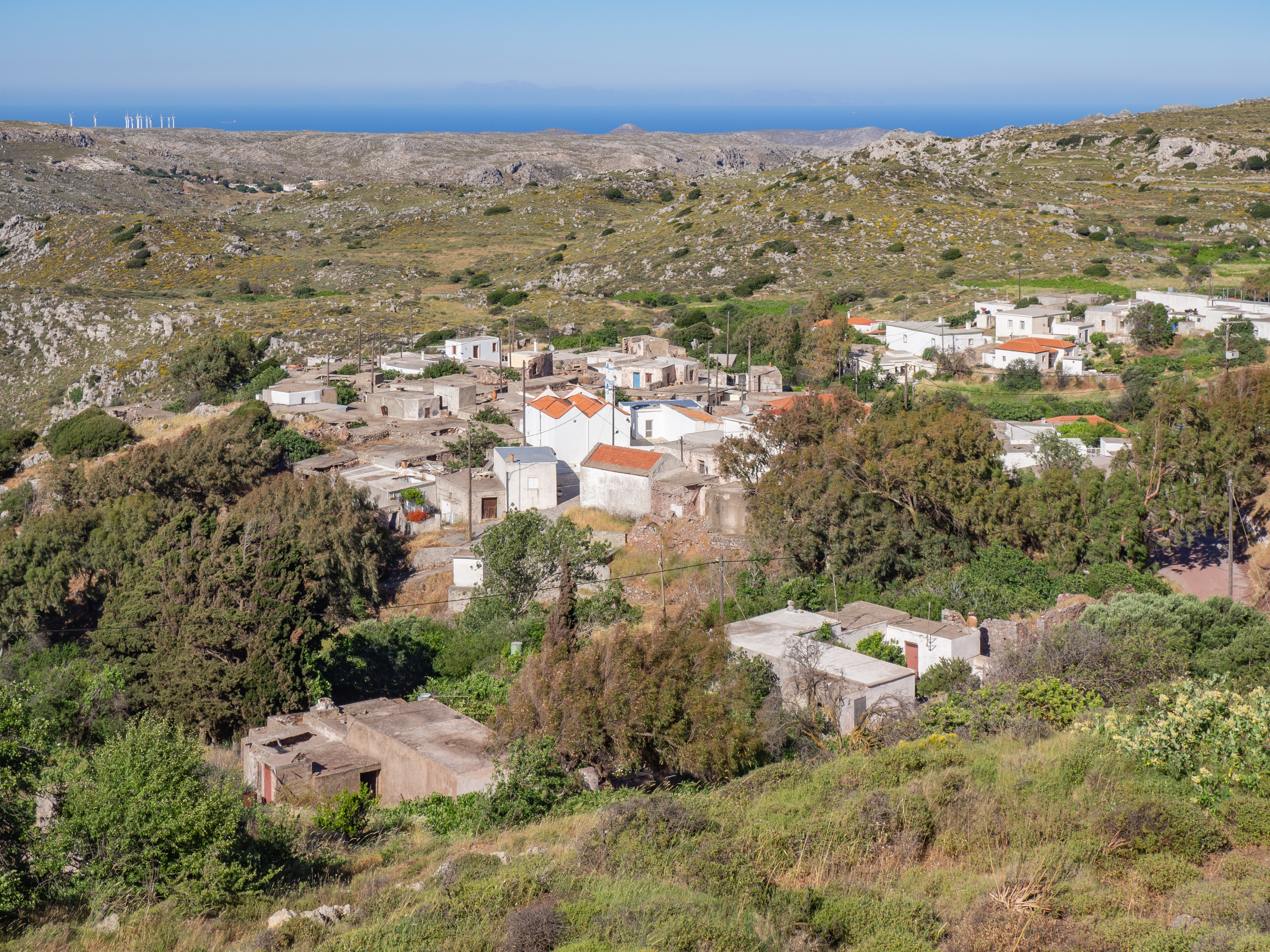
- The village, situated below the crest of a ridge, photographer looking north to the sea of Crete from a high point of the Zakros mountains.

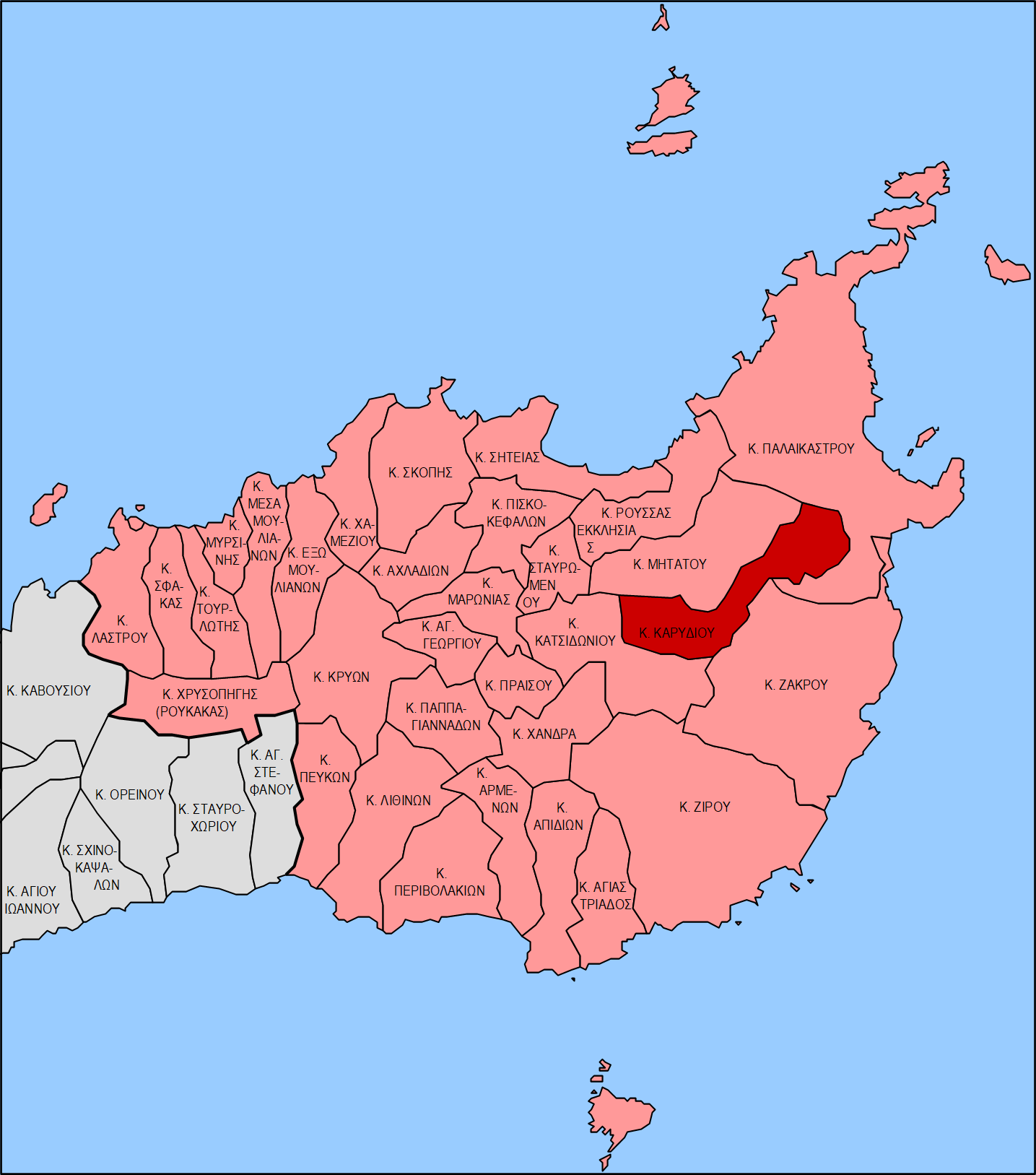
- Map of east Crete. Karydi is in red; Lasithi in pink and red

- Location within Greece
- Coordinates: 35°07′53″N 26°10′14″E
- Country: Greece
- Administrative region: Crete
- Regional unit: Lasithi
- Municipality: Siteia
- Municipal unit: Itanos
- Elevation: 566 m (1,857 ft)

Population (2021)
  - Community: 40
- Time zone: UTC+2 (EET)
  - Summer (DST): UTC+3 (EEST)
- Postal code: 723 00

Karydi (Greek: Καρύδι), officially Καρύδιον (Σητείας), is a village in the highlands of east Crete, Greece, part of the municipal unit Itanos. Under the Kallikratis Programme of 2011 it was made a local community (topiki koinoteta). Its chain of civic jurisdiction is as follows: municipal unit (demotike enoteta) Itanos, municipality (demos) Sitia, regional unit (periphereiakes enotetas) Lasithi, region (periphereia) Crete.

The population record, and to some extent the population, varies to such a degree that it is not possible to find credible documentation of it. The Greek-speaking population is on the move from the country to the city, from the hill villages, which in many cases are closing down, to the ports and the plains. Athens, once a ruined and nearly abandoned city, now is home to half the population of Greece.

The cities offer a full run of services available to any large city in Europe. In the case of Itanos the movement is from the settlements to Palaikastro and Siteia. (Note: "Gradually since the turn of the century people had been filling in and settling the maritime plain, but even after the Second World War the municipality, e.g. the post office, the police (4 of them) and the local school was at Karydi, ....") The latter, housing several thousand, has the airport and seaport, the hospital and the educational institutions. The villages are by no means isolated. They are connected to Siteia by good roads, automobiles, and a bus service. In addition to making wine and oil, herding sheep and growing fruits and vegetables, they cater to the tourist business, resulting in an increase of summer populations in villages otherwise abandoned or nearly so. Some industry also has found a place in the rural countryside, dotting it with scattered factories. The improvement of the power grid has made this last trend possible.

Karydi is a community with a long tradition. It first appears in the deeds and maps of the 16th century, although not in the Venetian census of 1583. The name appears to be based on the Greek word for walnut. There are, however, no walnut trees in the area. (Note: "Strangely, although Karydi means “walnut”, there is no sign of walnut trees in the village, though there are mulberry trees.") By chance a plaque of the times embossed with a walnut tree was found at Koutsounara, which might be hypothesized to be a heraldic symbol. Perhaps a family displaying that symbol founded Karydi. Koutsounara, however, is on the south coast. Any supposition of a heraldic symbol or an unknown family or any connection to Karydi is entirely guesswork.

== Geography ==
The higher mountains of Crete are not in east Crete. Its geology features parallel rows of NE-SW trending hills or low mountains up to a few thousand feet, mostly less, broken by cross-ravines draining to the ocean or the nearest valley. The terrain is karst, full of caves and deeply-cut crevices. A ravine can be a steep-sided gorge displaying rare or endemic plants, home to endemic birds and reptiles, or unusual configurations of minerals, or it can be a grassed and forested valley, typically used for agriculture and especially dendriculture. The soil is very fertile. Karydi is at 566 m (1,857 ft) elevation.

Otherwise the terrain is arid, grassless, and covered with a scattering of drought-resistant shrubs. Streams are intermittent, running in steep-sided chasms. Settlements are never found on the dry heights, always in or on the ravines. The road network also follows the ravines, usually built on their sides to avoid rockfall and intermittent flooding problems. The heights are abandoned except that in the late 20th and early 21st centuries scattered wind and solar farms have been placed there by the Public Power Corporation. Crete has nationalized, plug-in power, which it offers as a network fed by many sources. There is a wind farm near Toplou, and a solar farm near Karydi.

The easternmost row of elevations in Crete is the Coastal Hill Range, which sits partly in the Srait of Kasos. The next rows to the east, known generally as the Siteia (or Sitia, or Sitiaka) mountains, institute a certain degree of isolation from the rest of Crete, which probably fostered the political independence of east Crete. The Siteia mountains are subdivided into two rows, the Zakros mountains on the east, and a row comprising, south to north, the Thrypti range, the Ornon range, and the Western Siteia Foothills on the west.

Between the two is the valley of the intermittent Rema Pentelis, where Rema means "river," which flows for about 17 km (11 mi) (Note: From the distance-finder feature of Google maps. The upper river being intermittent for most of the year, it is difficult to ascertain in the ravine just where the water takes its flow.) due north from the vicinity of the highland plateaus of the Zakros mountains called Handros and Armeni (hence Handro-Armeni valley) after the settlements, about opposite Azali to the Bay of Sitia just east of Sitia. The lower river is totally controlled. Karydi sits in the middle of the massif of the Zakros Mountains. At that point a ravine crosses from the heights near the Pentelis valley to the Zakros Basin on the other side, which is the valley between the Zakros Mountains and the Coastal Hill Range.

In 2015 the Siteia mountains were defined to be Sitia UNESCO Global Geopark to protect its gorges, its 170 caves, and its numerous plant and animal fossils. The park area is 517 km^{2} (200 sq mi).

== Reference bibliography ==
- Fassoulas, Charalampos; et al. (2013). Ecotouristic Guide of Sitia Nature Park (PDF). Heraklion: Natural History Museum of Crete et al. ISBN 978-960-367-035-3. Archived from the original (PDF) on 2023-06-20.
