= Zakros Mountains, Crete =

Mountain range in eastern Crete, Greece

Zakros Mountains
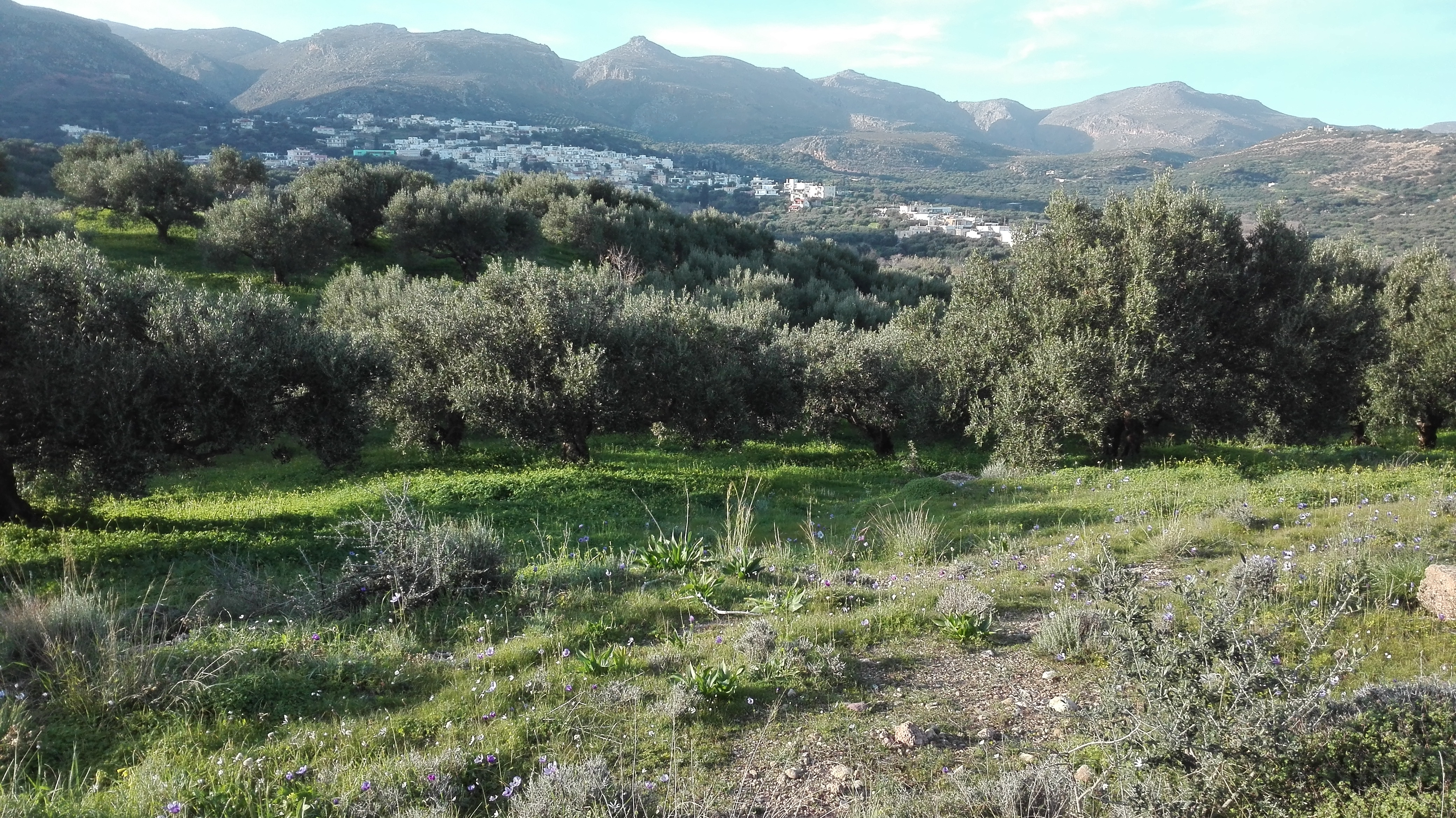
- Epano Zakros against the background of the Zakros Mountains across the Zakros Basin from the Coastal Hill Range, East Crete.

Highest point
- Peak: Plagia or Plagies
- Elevation: 817 m (2,680 ft)
- Prominence: 487 m (1,598 ft)
- Isolation: 14.9 km (9.3 mi) WNW
- Coordinates: 35°03′46″N 26°09′15″E

Naming
- Native name: Τα Όρη Ζάκρου (Greek)

Geography
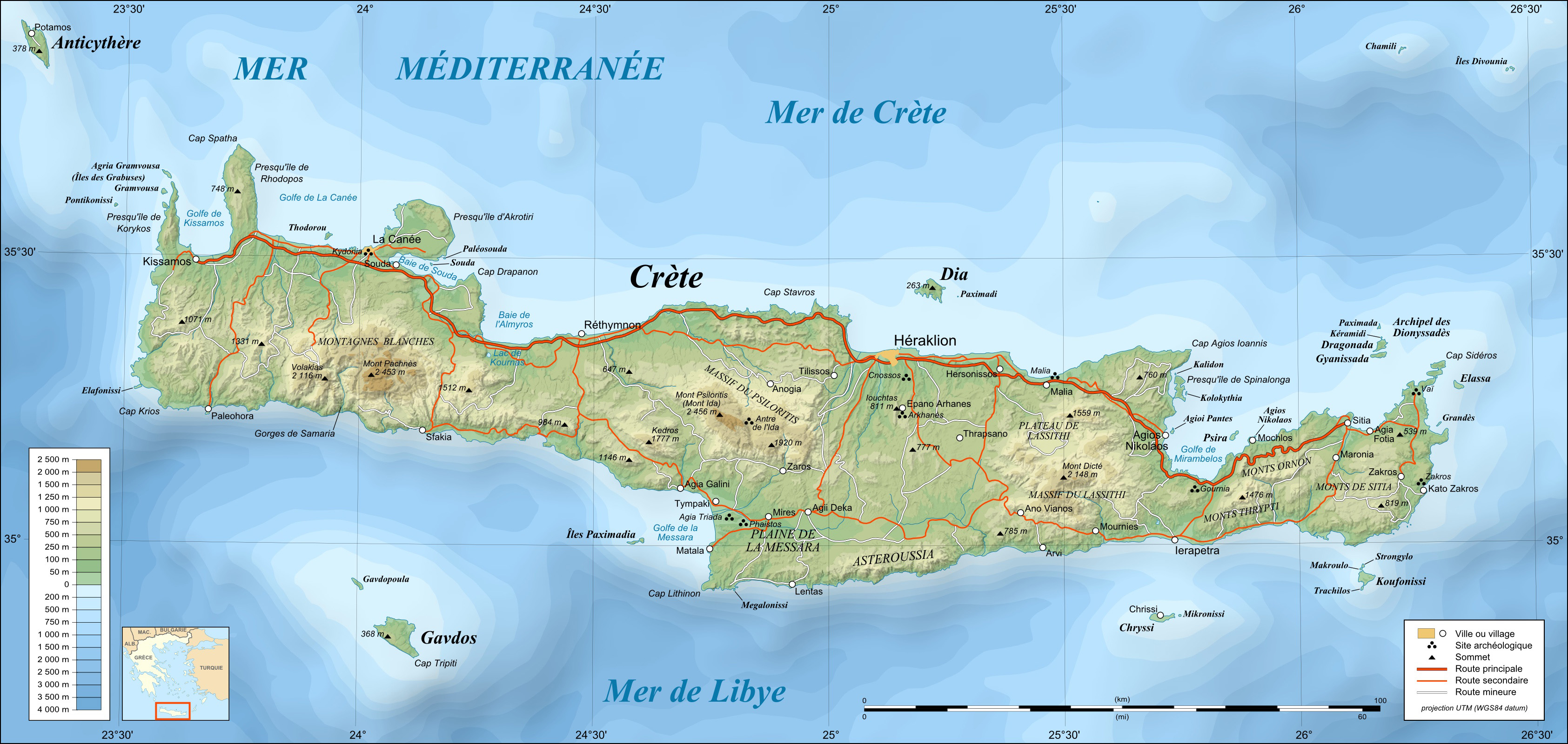
- Terrain map of Crete. For a close-up of eastern Crete, expand image.
- Location: Trends NE from Diaskari Beach on the southeast coast of Crete toward Toplou Monastery to the east of Siteia on the northeast coast.
- Country: Hellenic Republic
- Region (periphereia): Crete
- Regional unit (periphereiakis enotetas): Lasithi

The Zakros Mountains are a mountain range in Lasithi in eastern Crete, Greece. It trends to the northeast from Diaskari Beach in the southwest in the direction of Toplou Monastery near Cape Sidero.

This range are considered to be the east side of the Sitia mountains (Σητειακά βουνά), divided from the west side by the Rema Pentelis ("Pentelis river"), a stream with its valley that flows S-N across most of Crete at that point, entering the Bay of Sitia just east of Sitia. On the west side of the valley are three ranges more or less in a SW-NE line: the Thrypti mountains, the Ornon Mountains, and the Western Siteia Foothills. The four ranges together are considered the Sitia mountains

The 1975 creation of Sitia UNESCO Global Geopark placed much of the Sitia range in the park. It is the major range there, but not the only one. The coastal hill range (east coast) also is in it, so the park comprises all of Crete east of the Mochlos-Livari line.

== Geography ==
The mountains are a massif, seen from outside the massif as a wall of mountains. On top the massif are the montane slopes and plateaus of low enough inclination to support pastures, some agriculture or dendriculture, and villages. It is too dry at those altitudes for much greenery; a bare rocky slope is the norm. At lower altitudes is a maquis: shrubs, grass, scattered trees. The canyons, or gorges, are cut deeply into the edges of the massif by runoff from above, a process facilitated by the softness and solubility of limestone. Caves and deep cuts abound.

The massif can be roughly defined by the direction of the ravines coming off of it. On the west side they trend E-W into the Pentelis River Valley. To the north the ravines drain into the Sea of Crete, such as the Toplou Monastery Gorge. To the east the ravines trend W-E intersecting a valley. To the south the ravines trend N-S into th Sea of Libya.
