= Sitia Nature Park =

East Cretan UNESCO Global Geopark

- (in Greek) Φυσικό Πάρκο Σητείας
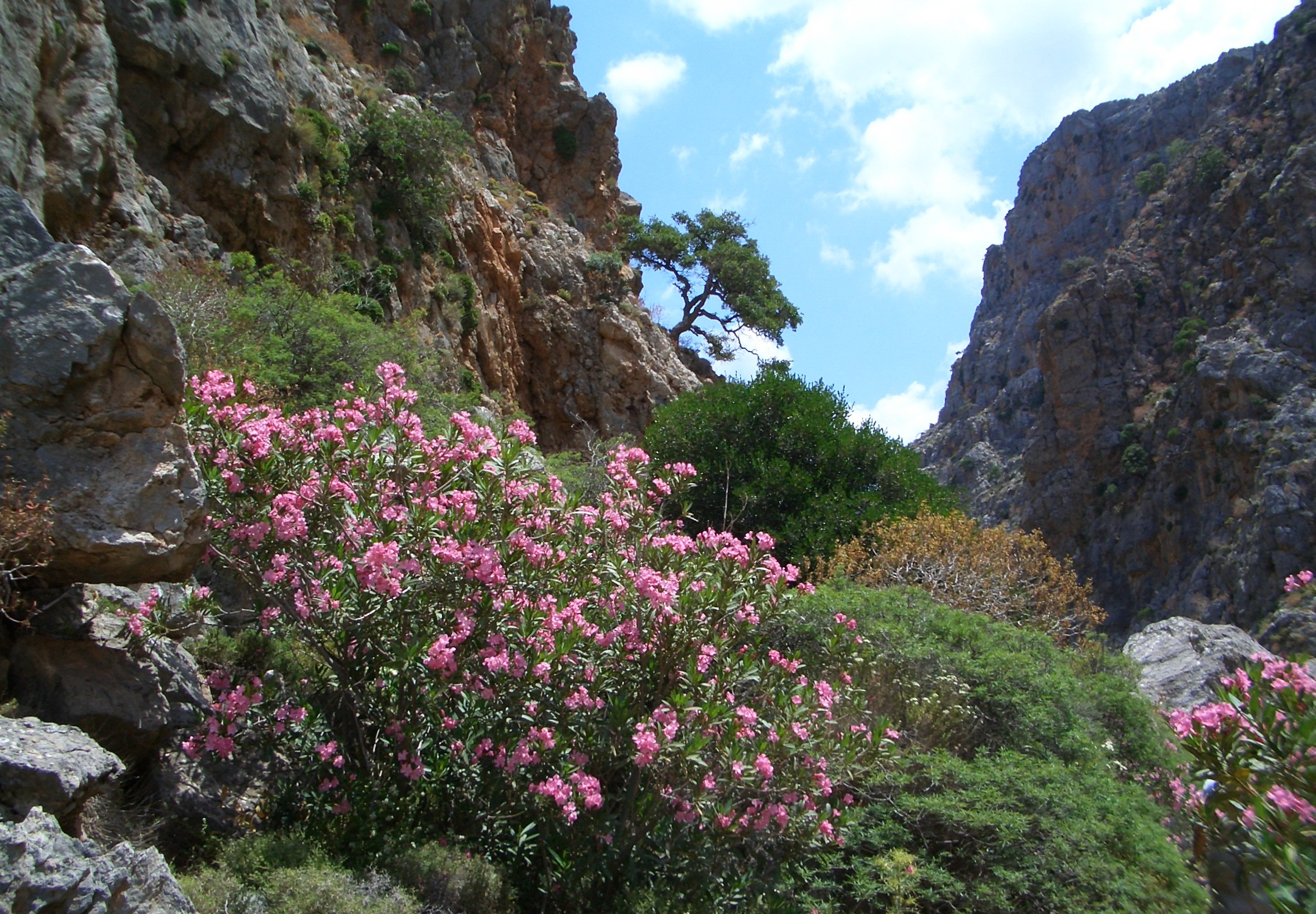
- Hikeable gorge, Zakros Canyon

- Location within Greece
- Location: Crete, Greece
- Nearest city: Sitia
- Coordinates: 35°07′53″N 26°10′14″E
- Governing body: DOKAS – Municipal Organization for Socio-Cultural Development of Siteia

Sitia Natural or Nature Park (Greek Φυσικό Πάρκο Σητείας) (Note: The usage is not native English. It translates fisiko parko, which is native Greek, and is used by the Natural History Museum of Crete.) is a UNESCO Global geopark located in the east of the island of Crete, in southern Greece. The park is nearly coterminous with the municipality of Sitia. The park, however, is not quite as large. Although the coasts are nearly the same, the overland border of the park does not extend as far to the southwest as the border of the municipality, though roughly parallel to it. The municipality contains the park, except that the naval base at the tip of Cape Sideros and the small islands are excluded.

In essence, the park is mountainous, containing the Sitia Mountains and its gorges, as well as the Coastal Hill Range, East Crete. However, much of the Thripti Mountains of the southwest have been inadvertently excluded. The premier activities offered by the park to the public, in addition to its two centers, is sponsored group spelunking in the extensive cave systems and group hiking over the peaks and gorges of eastern Crete, for those physically able to perform these arduous activities.

== Administrative history ==
Created in 2015 the park is a member of the European Geoparks Network, which is a regional organization of the UNESCO Global Geoparks Network. Geopark management was added to the responsibilities of a governmental agency, the Municipal Organization for Socio-Cultural Development of Sitia (DOKAS, abbreviation of the Greek name). (Note: Ο Δημοτικός Οργανισμός Κοινωνικοπολιτιστικής Ανάπτυξης Σητείας) Put together in 2011 under the Kallikratis program (Note: Law 3852/2010, "New Architecture of Self-Government and Decentralized Administration - Kallikratis Program".) by combination of several smaller agencies, its repertory of managed cultural projects includes others, such as the library and the philharmonic, as well as the geopark.

To the geopark, DOKAS serves as more of a board of directors. The immediate management is entrusted to a committee selected by DOKAS consisting of one member each chosen from 11 interested agencies, not all of them public: Municipality of Sitia, opposition of the Municipality of Sitia, DOKAS, Natural History Museum of Crete, Ephorate of Antiquities, Forestry Directorate, Sitia Development Organization, Sitia Hotel Association, KPE Ierapetra, Holy Monastery of Toplou, Sitia Mountaineering Association.
