= Coastal Hill Range, East Crete =

Mountain range in eastern Crete, Greece

Coastal Hill Range
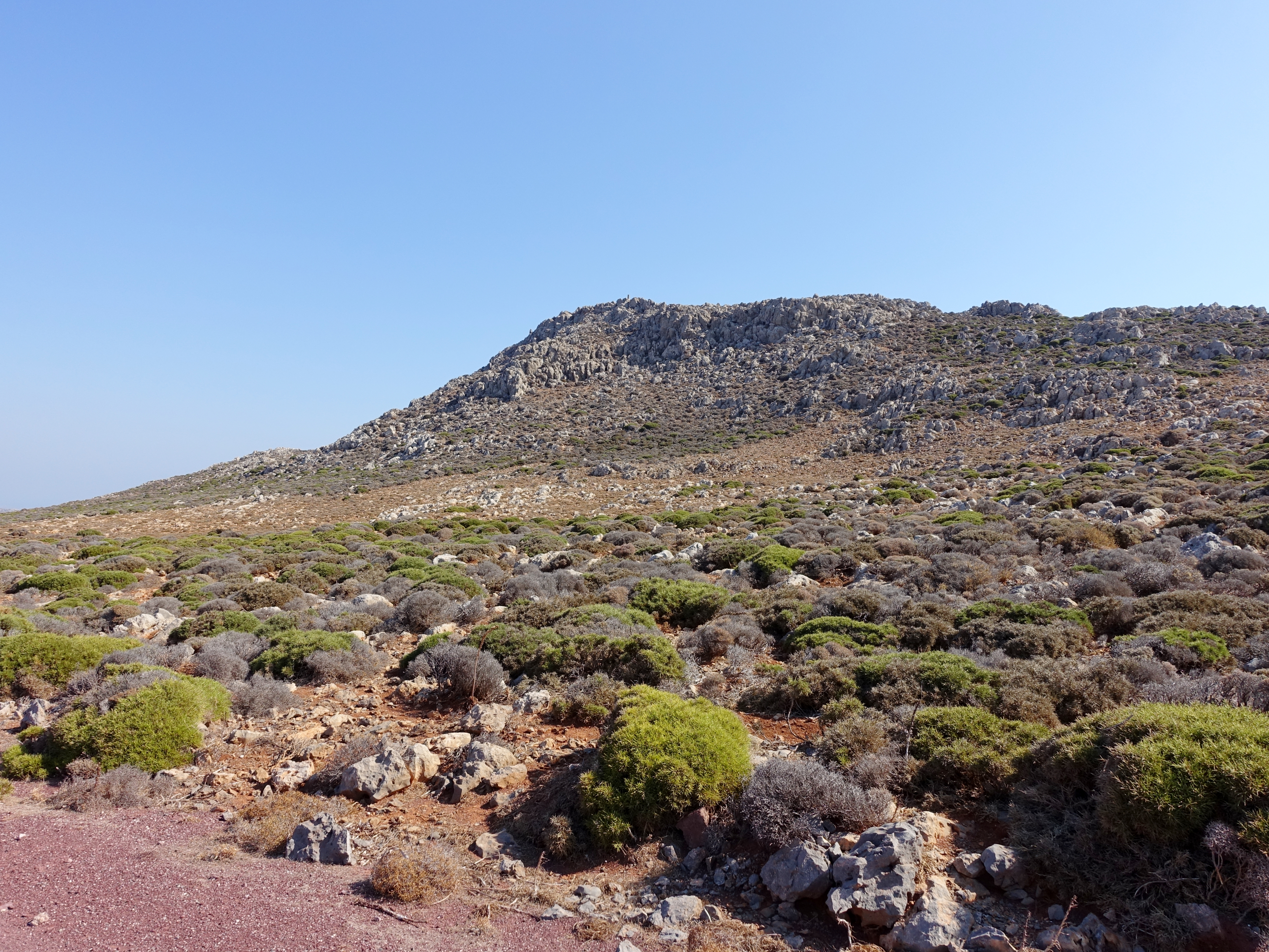
- Traostelos Hill, a peak of the Coastal Hill Range, as well as being the site of Minoan peak shrine.

Highest point
- Peak: Traostelos
- Elevation: 515 m (1,690 ft)
- Prominence: 301 m (988 ft)
- Isolation: 5.3 km (3.3 mi) W
- Coordinates: 35°07′34″N 26°16′01″E

Naming
- Native name: Η Παράκτια λοφοσειρά. (Greek)

Geography
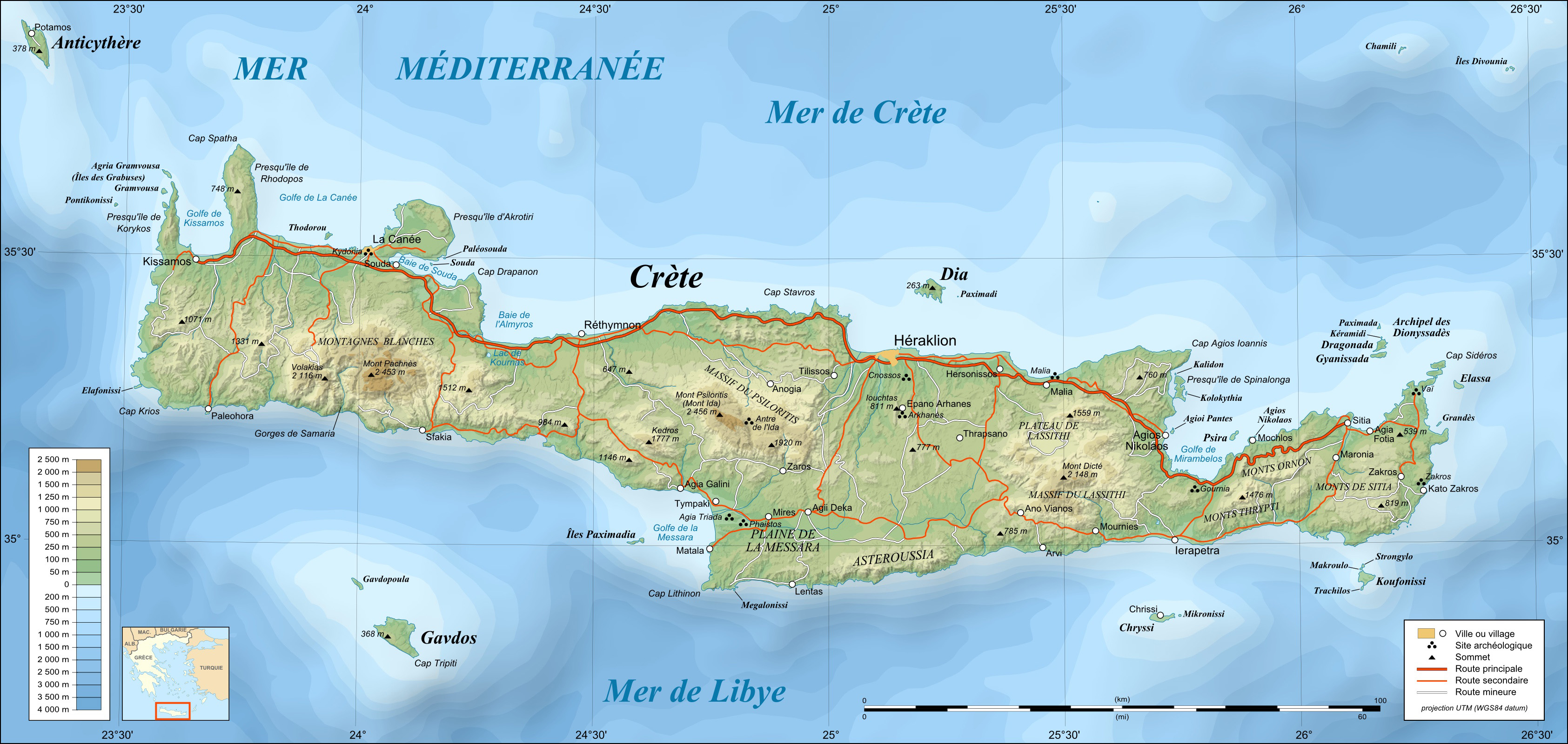
- Terrain map of Crete. For a close-up of eastern Crete, expand image.
- Country: Hellenic Republic
- Region (periphereia): Crete
- Regional unit (periphereiakis enotetas): Lasithi

The Coastal Hill Range, East Crete is a mountain range in Lasithi in eastern Crete, Greece. It trends to the northeast from Xerokampos in the southwest in the direction of Cape Sidero. The range, however is drowned on the eastern slopes by the Kasos Strait, a deepwater channel between the island of Kasos and the island of Crete. Its peaks thus become headlands, islands, or near-surface elevations, while the cols between them are typically beaches.

== Geography ==
The Coastal Hill Range is one of three SW-NE trending ranges of east Crete, the other two being called the Siteia Mountains. It consists of the Zakros Mountains on the east and, south to north in a row, the Thrypti, Ornon, and Western Siteia Foothills on the west, the two rows being separated by the Rema Pentelis ("Pentelis river"), a stream with its valley that flows S-N across most of Crete at that point, entering the Bay of Sitia just east of Sitia. Between the Siteia mountains and the Coastal Hill Range is the Zakros Basin, providing access to all the east Crete beaches and the two main promontories, Cape Sidero and Cape Plaka. The SW-NE rows continue eastward of Crete, but far under the surface.

The row of hills farthest east runs along the coast, being therefore called by the Natural Museum "the coastal hill range." It has eroded cross-ways into promontories sandwiched with inlets, (Note: The UNESCO website uses "lace-like coastline."), which typically feature a beach. Examples: Erimoupolis, Itanos, Vai beaches, and so on down the coast. The highest elevations are to the south of Cape Plakas, such as Simodi hill hanging over Karoumes beach at 416 m (1,365 ft) elevation (35°10′13″N 26°15′29″E), and Traostalos hill further south at 515 m (1,690 ft) elevation (35°07′34″N 26°16′01″E).

The access road of each beach connects to the inland valley, called the Zakros basin. It runs in a N-S direction parallel to the shore of east Crete, from Eremoupolis beach on Cape Sideros in the north, over a distance of about 27 km (17 mi) to Amatos beach on the south coast. It is not, however, a single geologic erosional form emptying into the sea south of Crete. Instead it drains from the north and south eastward through Zakro gorge about in the center. The gorge must have broken into a pre-existing non-erosional valley.

In fact an 11.3 km (7.0 mi) scarp along the west of the valley centered about Zakro must be a normal fault feature. It is matched by a possible fault on the other side of the valley. This is not a rift valley, as the elevated former beach terraces in the hills along the ocean suggest the coastal hill range was elevated in geologic time. The Natural History Museum supposes that the rows of elevation are still under compression perpendicular to them, causing the normal faults.

== The coastal range and the park system ==
The 1975 creation of Sitia UNESCO Global Geopark placed much of the Sitia range in the park. It is the major range there, but not the only one. The coastal hill range (east coast) also is in it, so the park comprises all of Crete east of the Mochlos-Livari line. The line trends NW-SE, so that much of Thrypti is actually omitted from the park. (Note: This configuration of the park combined with the confusion of Thrypti with the Sitia mountains leads to the Internet contradiction that the Sitia mountains are and are not in the park.)

== Reference bibliography ==
- Fassoulas, Charalampos; et al. (2013). Ecotouristic Guide of Sitia Nature Park (PDF). Heraklion: Natural History Museum of Crete et al. ISBN 978-960-367-035-3.
