= Karydi =

Karydi (Greek: Καρύδι) may refer to several villages on Crete, Greece:

- Karydi, Itanos, part of the municipality Itanos
- Karydi, Ierapetra, part of the municipality Ierapetra
- Karydi, Neapoli, part of the municipality Neapoli
