= Mesona Gorge =

Coordinates: 35°06′33″N 25°52′25″E

The gorge of Mesona located in Ierapetra, east of the village of Kavoussi, shortly after the church of Agia Kyriaki. It is relatively a small canyon, and the length is up to 4 km, linking the plateau Thripti the area Kavoussi.

The canyon is narrow enough nonetheless but it is passable. It requires a little climbing with ropes and more walking. In the last part of the journey, the morphology of the canyon changes abruptly, as it becomes more narrow and tall walls. Water is only minimal in winter.

If someone does not have the fitness to traverse the canyon, you can walk along the sides of the gorge. On the west side there is a cement aqueduct, which has carved the path and show the way. Passing through the gorge takes about an hour.
