= Sitia Mountains =

Mountain ranges in eastern Crete, Greece

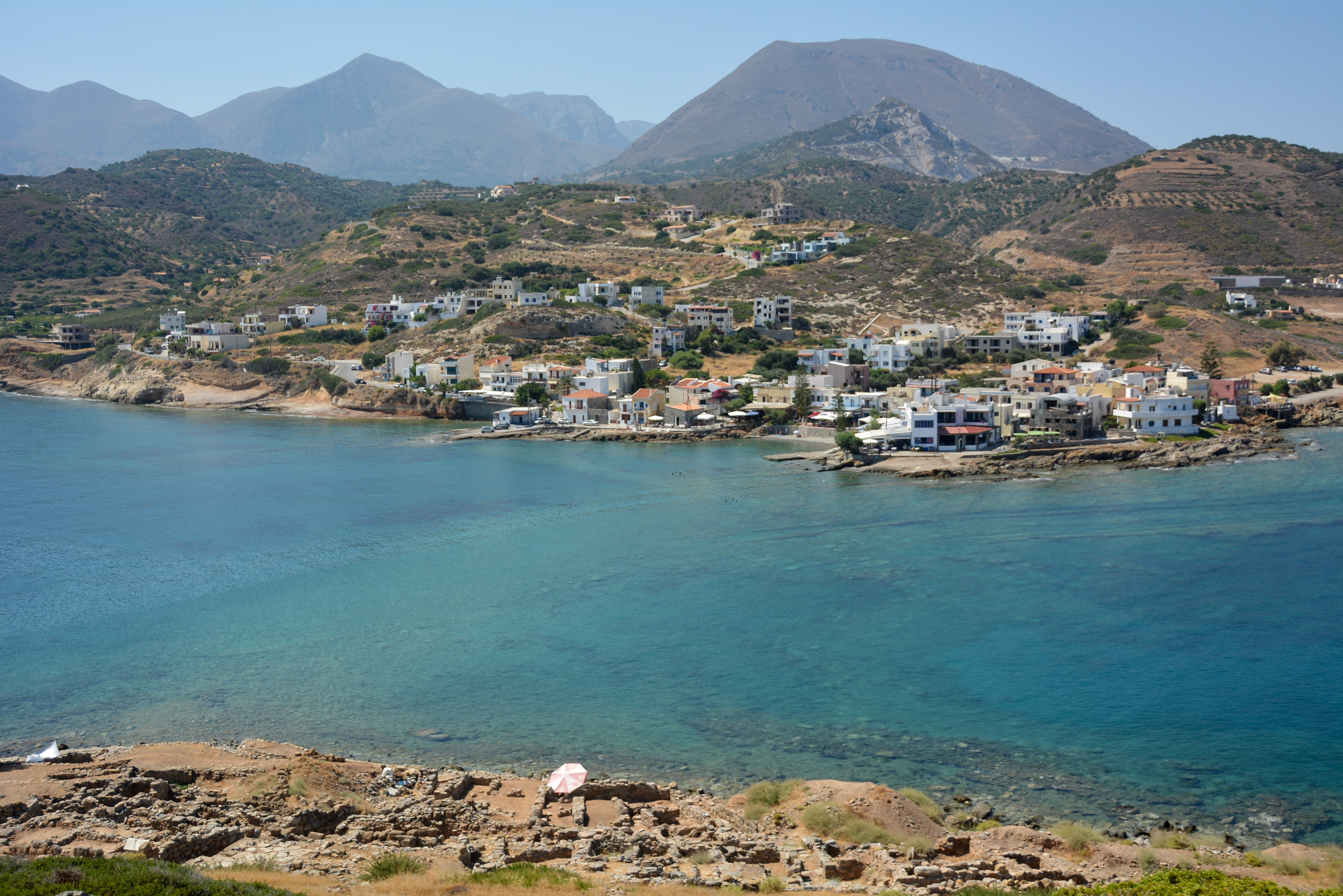
- A telescoping photograph of the northern end of the West Sitia Range taken from Mochlos Island, site of a partly drowned Minoan town. In the foreground is the village of Mochlos, situated on the coast of the Western Siteia Foothills visible in the uplands behind it. In the right background is the western flank of Kapsas, the northernmost peak of Thrypti. In the left background are the Ornon Mountains.

Highest point
- Peak: Afentis Stavromenos
- Elevation: 1,476 m (4,843 ft)
- Prominence: 1,354 m (4,442 ft)
- Isolation: 26.2 km (16.3 mi) W
- Coordinates: 35°03′46″N 26°09′15″E

Naming
- Native name: Σητειακά βουνά (Greek)

Geography
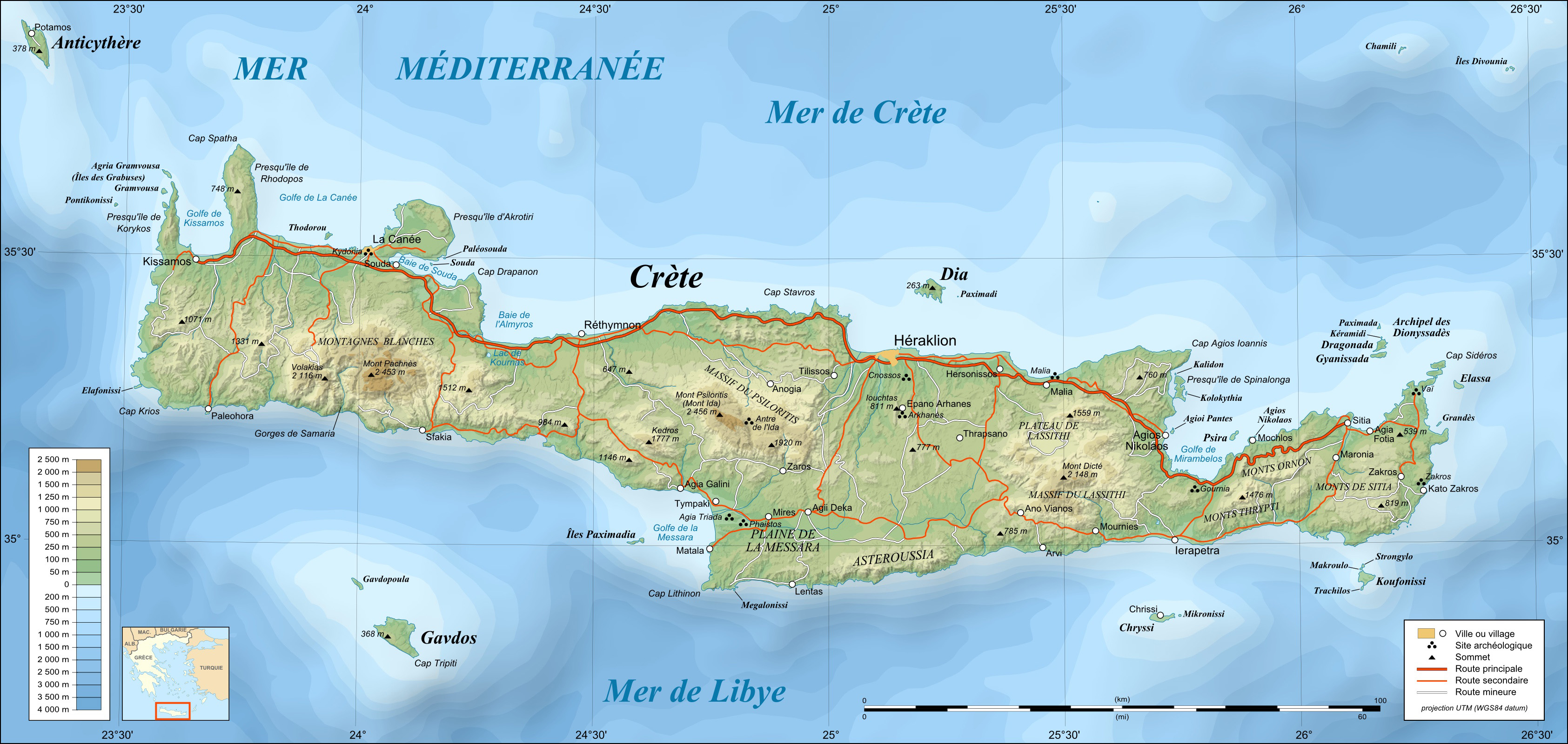
- Terrain map of Crete. For a close-up of eastern Crete, expand image.
- Location: Trending SW on the south coast to NE in front of Sitia on the north coast.
- Country: Hellenic Republic
- Region (periphereia): Crete
- Regional unit (periphereiakis enotetas): Lasithi

The Sitia or Siteia Mountains, also known as the Sitiaka Range, are a group of four mountain ranges extending SW-NE in Lasithi in eastern Crete, Greece. Stretching from the southern coast to the plain of the city of Sitia on the northern coast, they tend to isolate east Crete from the rest of Crete, creating a refugium for the rare plant and animal species and a refuge for the ancient people practising the Minoan culture. In this ancient refuge are now to be found the ruins of Minoan sites at Mochlos, Kato Zakro, Palaikastro, and Kavousi. These are four of the major sites of East Crete, but the number of sites recorded or excavated is in the hundreds. Endemic species, many rare or endangered, are to be found in the gorges that cut from upland to ocean or valley on all sides.

== Geography ==
The four ranges are configured in two rows, termed the West Sitia Mountains and the East Sitia Mountains. (Note: A reference to mountains in west Sitia is usually clear-cut, meaning no further west than the Thrypti massif, with the Dikti mountains being further west, around the Gulf of MIrabello. The one exception is the argument that the Sitia Mountains were once called the Dikti, in which case the Sitia or Dikti Mountains would require all of Lasithi. The East Sitia Mountains are usually the Zakros Mountains but often with reference to the Minoan peak sanctuaries the Zakros Mountains and the coastal range are lumped under such terms as "the Eastern Siteian uplands." Nearly all the peak sanctuaries are in the Zakros Mountains, but in the Palaiokastro region the two ranges come close together, and Petsofas in the coastal range at the base of Cape Plaka hosts a peak sanctuary. The "Eastern Siteian Upland" includes it. There are so many peaks in Crete that not all of them have names; thus the archaeological writers have a certain amount of freedom in naming them ad hoc to fit the circumstances, which causes some definition problems.) The west side is divided from the east side by the Rema Pentelis ("Pentelis river"), a stream with its valley that flows S-N across most of Crete at that point, entering the Bay of Sitia just east of Sitia. The town of Sitia (or Siteia) is situated in some flat land, the Plain of Sitia, forming a port in the Bay of Sitia. The port is a road center and major access point to East Crete. It is the site of the major services to the area: the seaport, the airport, the hospital, educational services, and so on. The villages scattered throughout the mountains and along the coast are becoming more and more summer residences catering to tourism. Some, such as Voila and Etia, have been completely abandoned, and give the appearance of an ancient ruined village.

The West Sitia Mountains comprise three ranges abutting each other south to north. The differences are entirely geomorphological or geopolitical and are conventional. The Thrypti Mountains are located in the southwest. They trend to the northeast from Ierapetra in the direction of Sitia. However, they only go half-way in that direction. The rest of the distance is completed by the distinct Ornon mountains, separated from the Thrypti by the Bebonas river valley, (Note: This intermittent river runs W-E dividing the mountains and then bends abruptly south to empty into the Sea of Libya.) and the Western Siteia Foothills, of lower elevation, covering the space between the Ornon range and Siteia itself. (Note: There is some confusion on the Internet due to over-abbreviation. The Ornon might be omitted, making the whole range into the Thrypti, or the Thrypti might be identified with the Sitia, omitting the Zakros. Some bloggers attempt to remedy the confusion by devising the term Ornon-Thrypti as opposed to Ornon Oros ("Mount Ornon"), but these solutions have no general usage or official credibility. They amount to individuals making up convenient mountain names.)

The East Sitia Mountains consist only of the Zakros mountains, also trending SW-NE.

== Parkland ==
The 2015 creation of Sitia UNESCO Global Geopark placed much of the Sitia range in the park. It is the major range there, but not the only one. The coastal hill range (east coast) also is in it, so the park comprises all of Crete east of the Mochlos-Livari line. The line trends NW-SE, so that much of Thrypti is actually omitted from the park. (Note: This configuration of the park combined with the confusion of Thrypti with the Sitia mountains leads to the Internet contradiction that the Sitia mountains are and are not in the park.)

== See also ==
- Thrypti
- Ornon Mountains, Crete
- Western Siteia Foothills
- Zakros Mountains, Crete
