= Ornon Mountains, Crete =

Mountain range in eastern Crete, Greece

Ornon
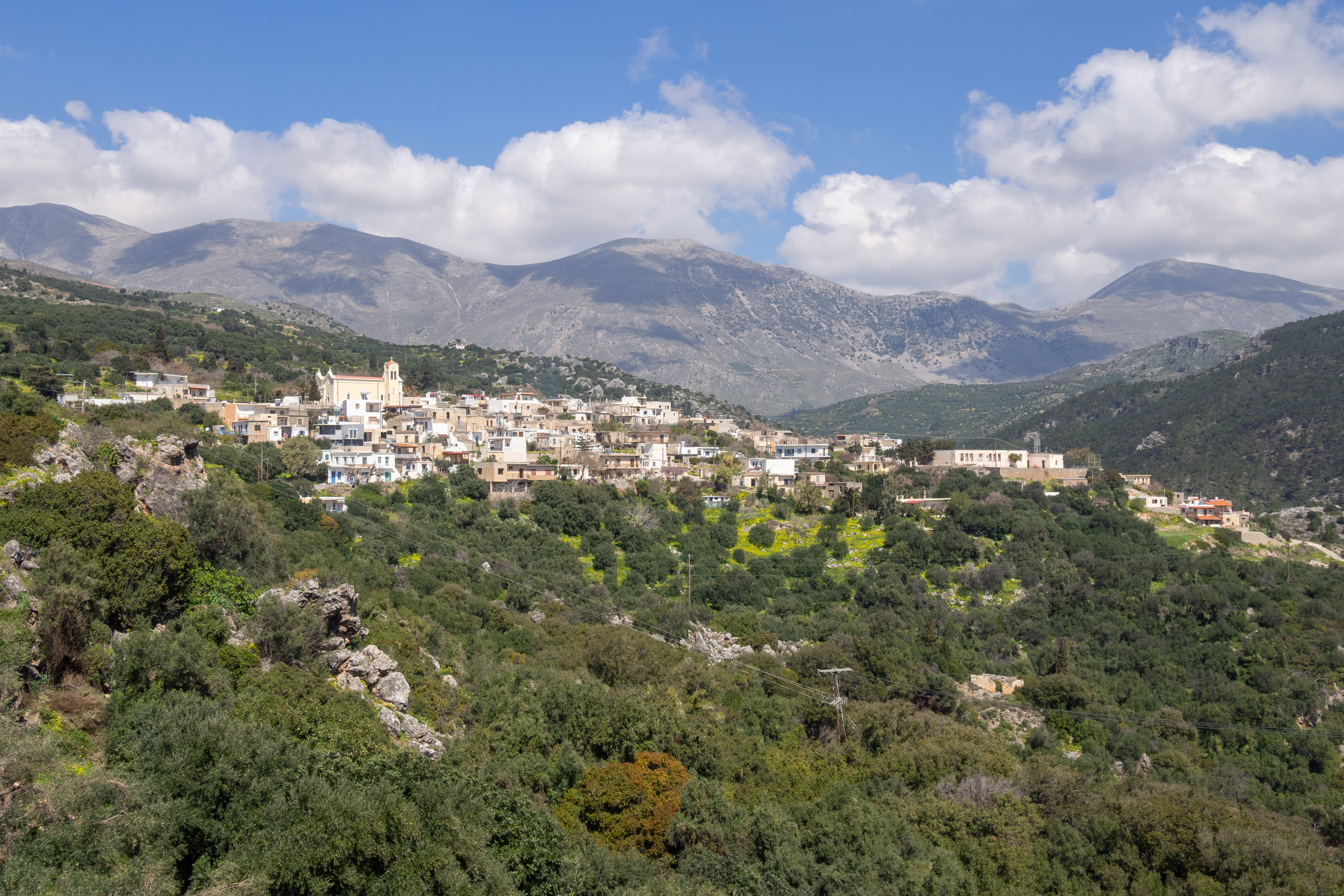
- Ornon Mountains seen in the background from southward. In the foreground is the village of Stavrochori.

Highest point
- Peak: Ornon (Note: Altitude and prominence data tend to vary on the Internet, as well as the exact coordinates of the peaks, for whatever reasons. Some sources list Ornon as the highest peak, while others have Spathi. PeakVisor lists an elevation of 1,181 m (3,875 ft) for Spathi, prominence 256 m (840 ft), isolation 2.2 km (1.4 mi) E, location 35°07′20″N 25°54′08″E. According to the elevations in PeakVisor, Spathi is the lesser peak.)
- Elevation: 1,233 m (4,045 ft)
- Prominence: 434 m (1,424 ft)
- Isolation: 2.9 km (1.8 mi) WSW
- Coordinates: 35°07′10″N 25°55′28″E

Naming
- Native name: Ὄρνον ὄρος (Greek)

Geography
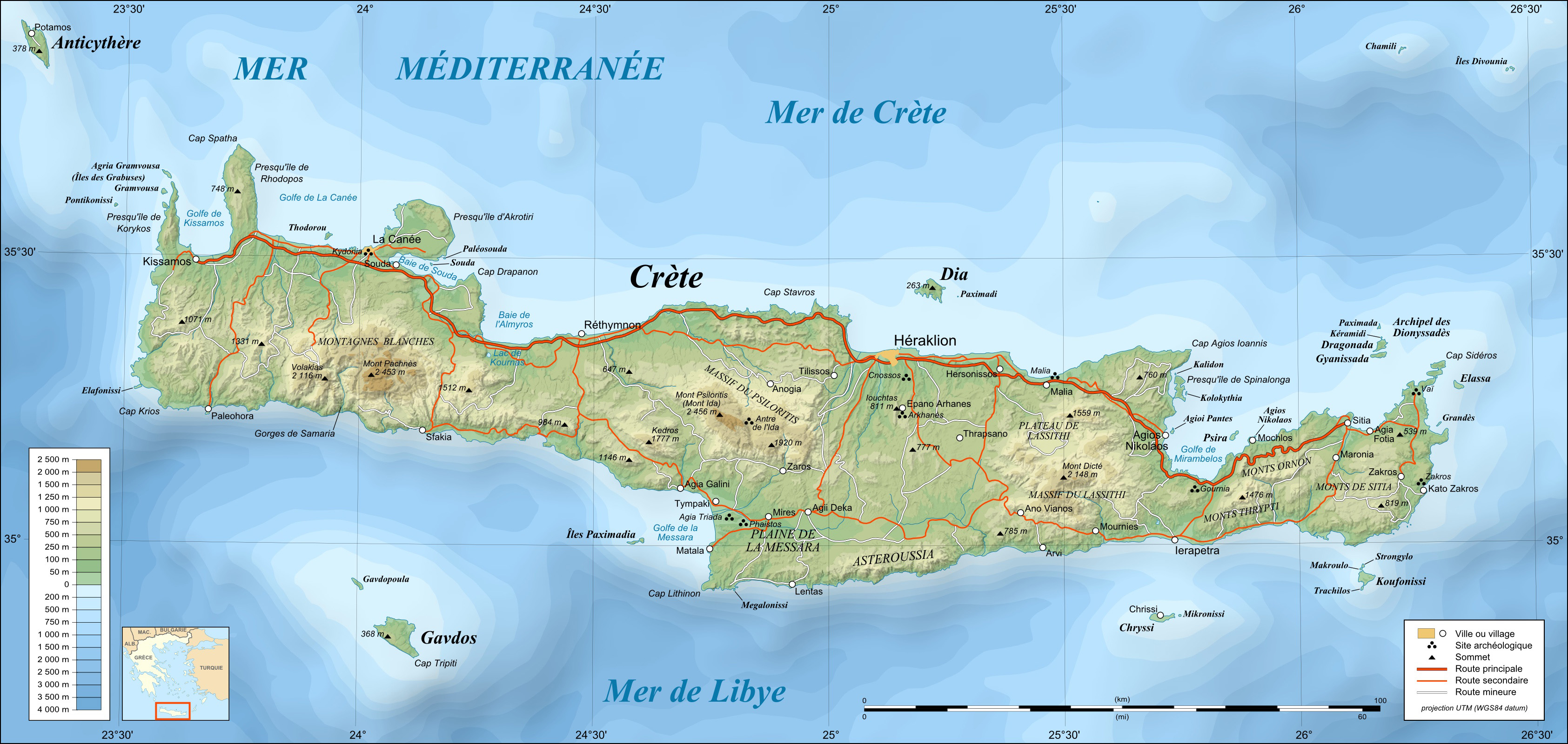
- Terrain map of Crete. For a close-up of eastern Crete, expand image.
- Location: The second peak to the east.
- Country: Hellenic Republic
- Region (periphereia): Crete
- Regional unit (periphereiakis enotetas): Lasithi

Ornon (Greek: Ὄρνον) is a mountain range in Lasithi in eastern Crete, Greece. It trends from west to east starting at Kavousi in Ierapetra and ending at Praesos in the east. Part of the Sitia Mountains, it is northeast of Thrypti and south of the Western Siteia Foothills, which border on the north coast to the west of Sitia.

== Geography ==
The Ornon mountains are entirely in the municipality of Ierapetra in Lasithi regional unit. The canyons, or gorges, are cut deeply into the edges of the massif by runoff from above, a process facilitated by the softness and solubility of limestone. Caves and deep cuts abound.
