= Ornon =

- Commune
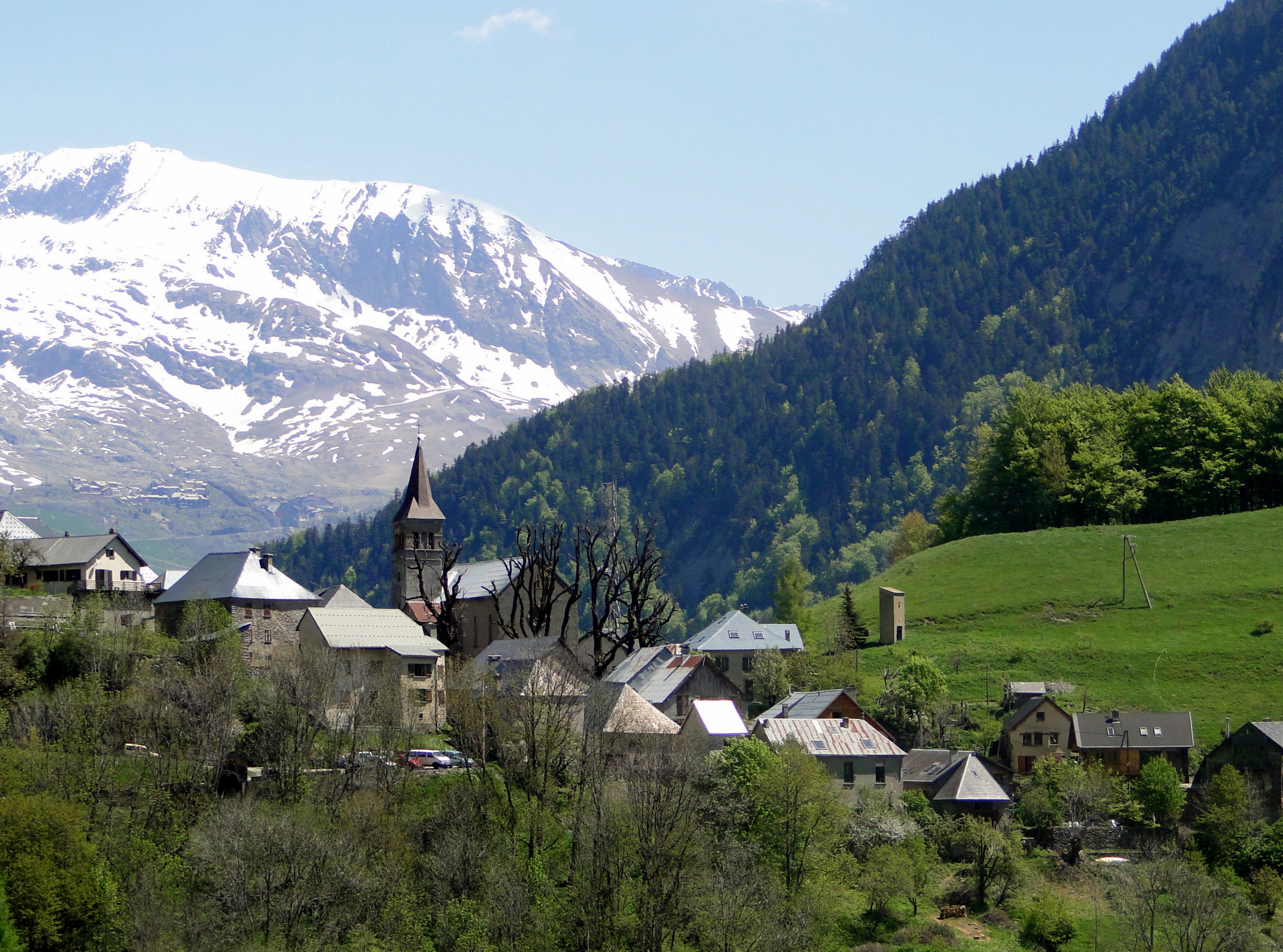
- The village of Ornon
- Location of Ornon
- Location within France Location within Auvergne-Rhône-Alpes
- Coordinates: 45°02′54″N 5°58′45″E
- Country: France
- Region: Auvergne-Rhône-Alpes
- Department: Isère
- Arrondissement: Grenoble
- Canton: Oisans-Romanche

Government
  - Mayor (2020–2026): Nicole Faure
- Area^{1}: 11.6 km^{2} (4.5 sq mi)
- Highest elevation: 2,856 m (9,370 ft)
- Lowest elevation: 799 m (2,621 ft)
- Population (2023): 143
  - Density: 12.3/km^{2} (31.9/sq mi)
- Time zone: UTC+01:00 (CET)
  - Summer (DST): UTC+02:00 (CEST)
- INSEE/Postal code: 38285 /38520
- ^{1} French Land Register data, which excludes lakes, ponds, glaciers > 1 km^{2} (0.386 sq mi or 247 acres) and river estuaries.

Ornon (French pronunciation: [ɔʁnɔ̃]) is a commune in the Isère department in southeastern France.

== Population ==
Historical population
Year	Pop.	±% p.a.
1968	157	—
1975	81	−9.02%
1982	65	−3.09%
1990	87	+3.71%
1999	138	+5.26%
2007	138	+0.00%
2012	134	−0.59%
2017	152	+2.55%
2023	143	−1.01%
Source: INSEE

== See also ==
- Communes of the Isère department
