= Thrypti =

Mountain range in eastern Crete, Greece

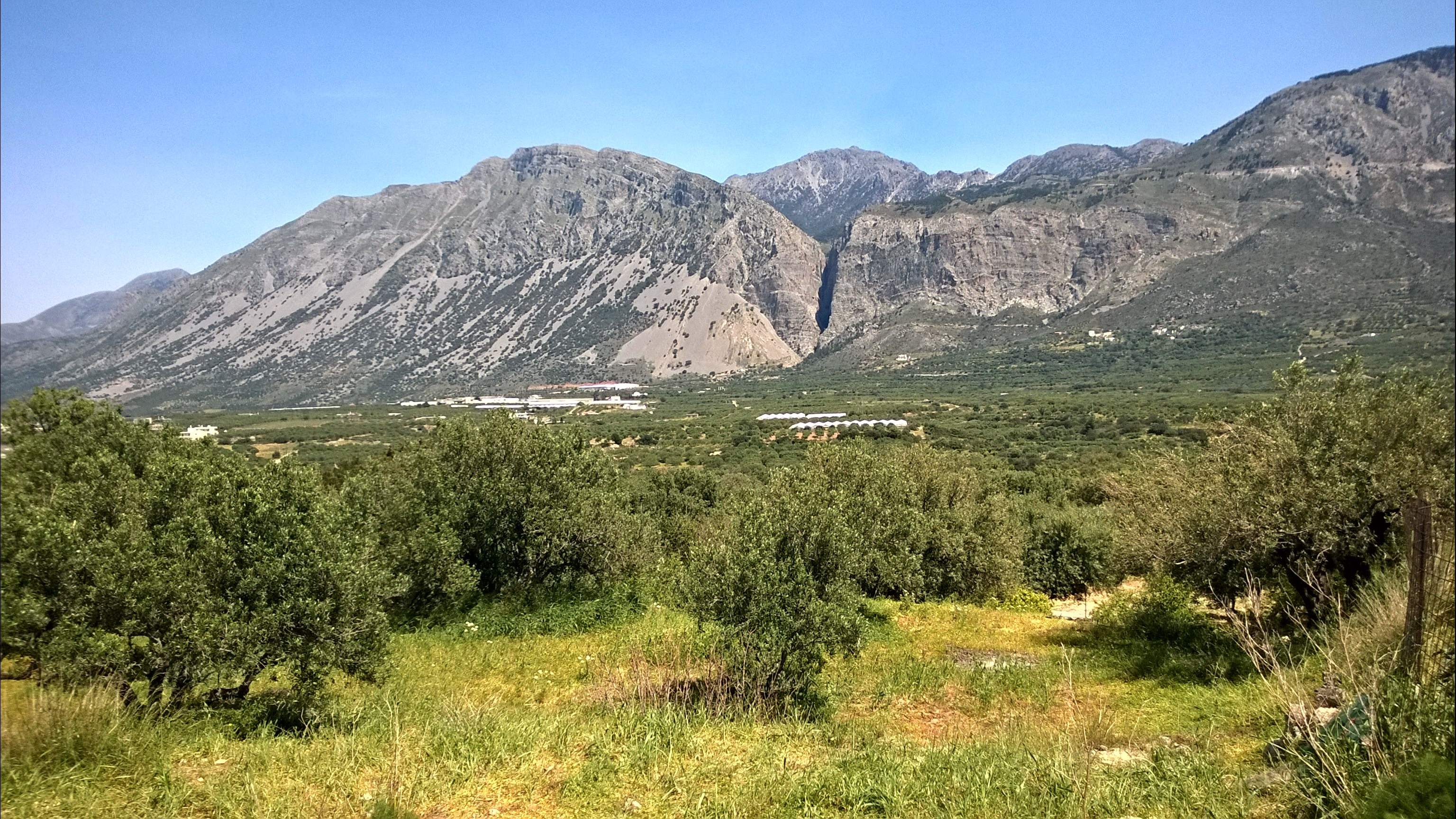
- The west wall of Thrypti seen from the valley further west. This is the "wall" of the Sitia Mountains reported by archaeological authors of the early 20th century approaching from Heraklion. The mouth of Ha Gorge is in the center.

Highest point
- Peak: Afentis Stavromenos
- Elevation: 1,476 m (4,843 ft)
- Prominence: 1,351 m (4,432 ft)
- Isolation: 26.2 km (16.3 mi) W
- Listing: Ribu
- Coordinates: 35°4′48″N 25°52′32″E

Dimensions
- Length: 20 km (12 mi) SW-NE
- Width: 9 km (5.6 mi) NW-SE

Naming
- Native name: Θρυπτή (Greek)

Geography
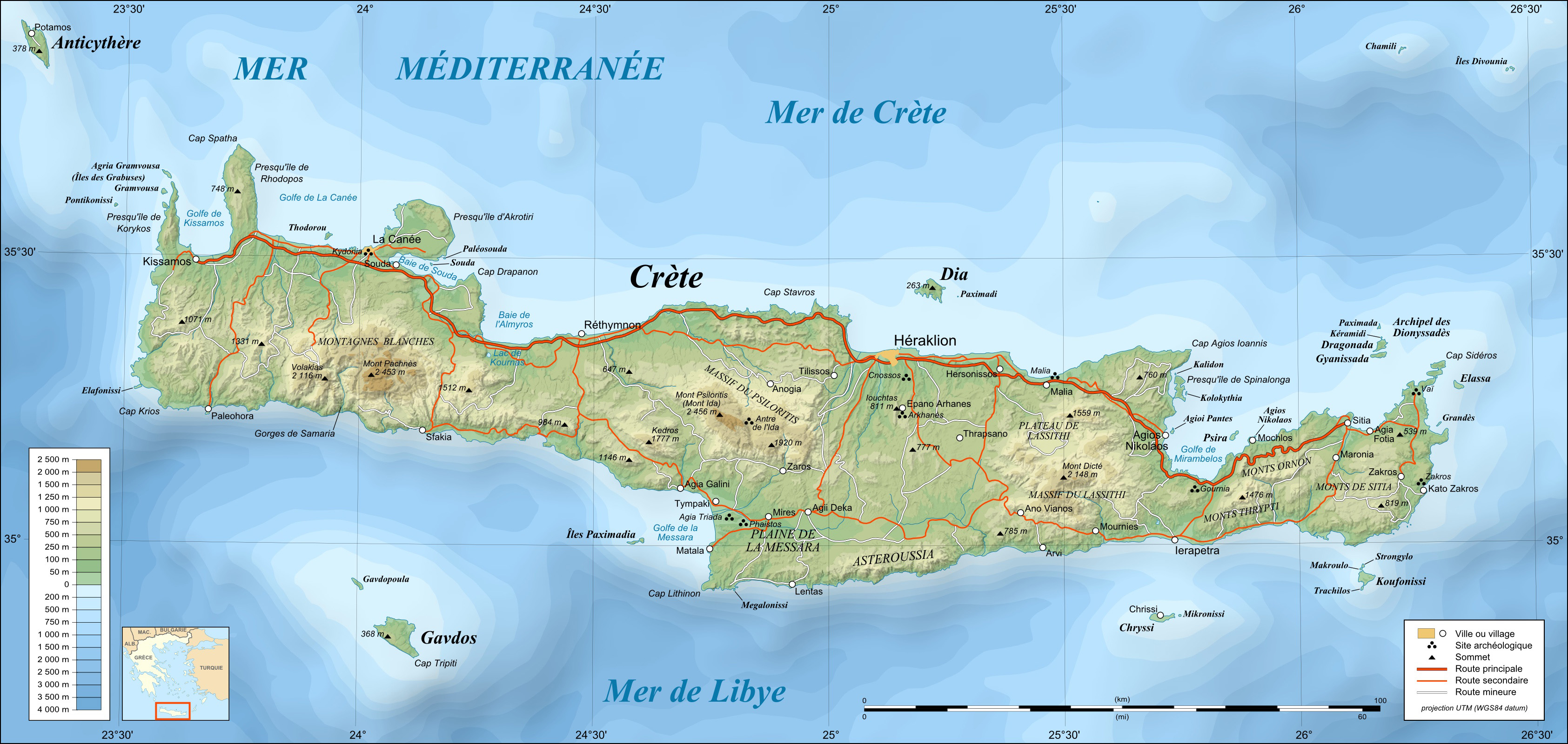
- Terrain map of Crete. For a close-up of eastern Crete, expand image.
- Location: Trends NE from Ierapetra toward Sitia up to the Bebonas river valley.
- Country: Hellenic Republic
- Region (periphereia): Crete
- Regional unit (periphereiakis enotetas): Lasithi

Thrypti (Greek: Θρυπτή) is a mountain range in Lasithi in eastern Crete, Greece. It trends to the northeast from Ierapetra in the southwest in the direction of Sitia. However, it only goes half-way in that direction. The rest of the distance is completed by the distinct Ornon mountains, separated from the Thrypti by the Bebonas river valley, (Note: This intermittent river runs W-E dividing the mountains and then bends abruptly south to empty into the Sea of Libya.) and the lower Western Siteia Foothills covering the space between the Ornon range and Sitia itself. The highest peak of Thrypti is Afentis, which is 1,476 m amsl. (Note: The source lists three peaks named Afentis, "Lord," two with a different qualifier. The "Lord" in this case derives from the name of an Orthodox Christian building of worship on the peak. This peak has one also, bearing a distinctive cross. It is often called Afentis Stavromenos, "Lord of the cross," named after the founder of the religion, parallel to Afentis Christos used elsewhere. Sometimes just Stavromenos is used instead of just Afentis.) The three ranges constitute the West Sitia Mountains.

== Geography ==
The Thrypti mountains are virtually 100% under the municipality of Ierapetra in Lasithi regional unit. The NE border of Ierapetra is so irregular that some small pockets of Thrypti might inadvertently be in neighboring Siteia municipality. Certainly the Sitia Mountains include ranges from both municipalities.

The Thripti mountains run diagonally SW from the southern coast at the city of Ierapetra (where they are not much in evidence) to the border of Sitia at Mirabello Bay, which is another reason why they alone are not the Sitia mountains. They are not even in Sitia. The Bebonas valley cannot serve as a border near the coast, as it only descends from its origin in the pre-existing mountains. The distance from Ierapetra to that valley is about 20 km (12 mi), which can be taken as an approximate length of the mountains. The maximum width perpendicular to a representative length is up to about 9 km (5.6 mi), but of course the width varies from a few km near Ierapetra.

The mountains are a massif, seen from outside the massif as a wall of mountains. On top the massif are the montane slopes and plateaus of low enough inclination to support pastures, some agriculture or dendriculture, and villages. It is too dry at those altitudes for much greenery; a bare rocky slope is the norm. The canyons, or gorges, are cut deeply into the edges of the massif by runoff from above, a process facilitated by the softness and solubility of limestone. Caves and deep cuts abound.

=== West side ===
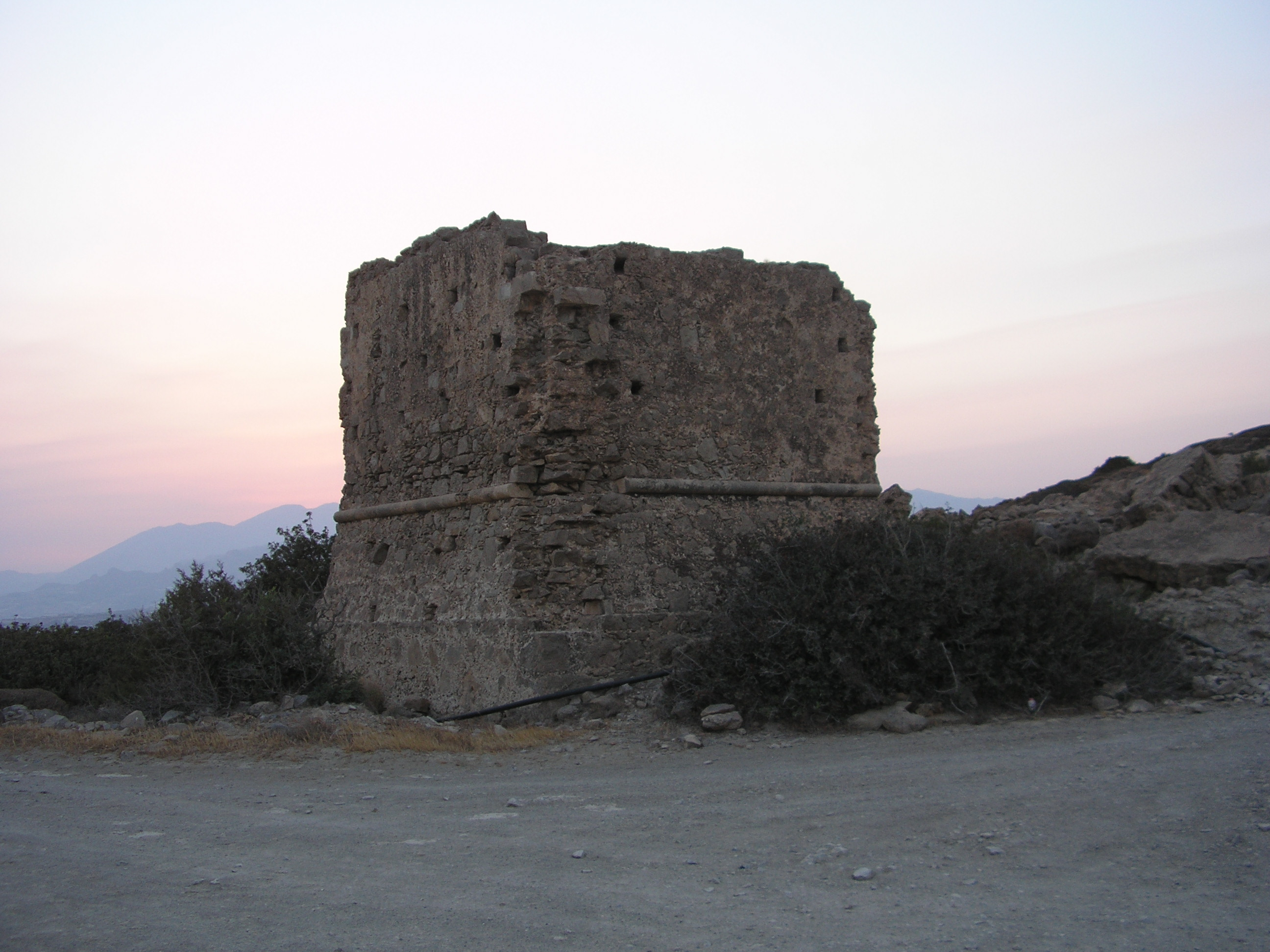
Vainia Tower

One method of defining the borders of the Thripti massif is to follow the wall around its periphery. The terrain offers a good starting point in Vainia, a settlement of Ierapetra to its NE. The village is noted for Vainia Tower (35°01′33″N 25°46′49″E), built by the Venetians 4.55 km (2.83 mi) from the city center at an elevation of 160 m (520 ft). This landmark comes the closest of any to being the SW corner of the massif. It looks over flat farmland divided into plots all the way to the city. Above it looms Skouros peak, 440 m (1,440 ft), and above that (35°03′58″N 25°50′28″E) Katalymata peak, 802 m (2,631 ft).

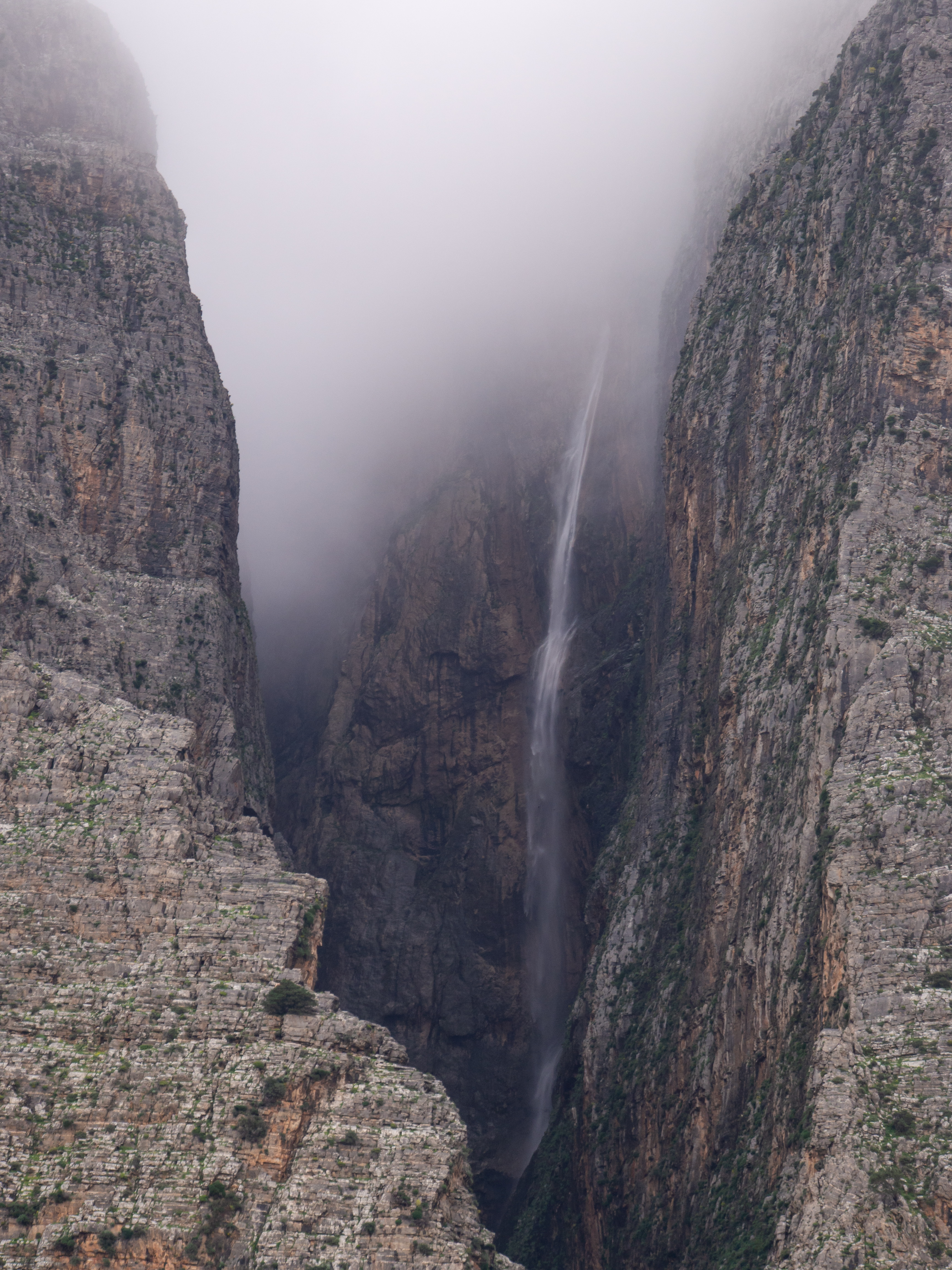
Mastoras waterfall, which plunges 210 m (690 ft), losing most of its water to vapor.

Heading north on Route 20 (ΕΠ 20) at the foot of the massif one arrives at Plakoura, where Route 20A branches to the east toward Ha Gorge; otherwise, Route 20 does not approach it. The gorge is at the bottom of a valley flanked by Koufota, 880 m (2,890 ft), to the south and Papoura, 990 m (3,250 ft), to the north. Through the bottom of the gorge is only a hiking trail, considered dangerous, but 20A bypasses it, climbing in hairpin turns across the upper slopes of Koufota, to arrive at Thrypti plateau at the 722 m (2,369 ft) contour line, where the original Thrypti village is located (35°05′28″N 25°51′48″E) under the high point of the range, Afentis, which reaches to 1,476 m (4,843 ft) to the south. Springs in Thrypti feed a stream that plunges into the chasm at Mastoras waterfall.

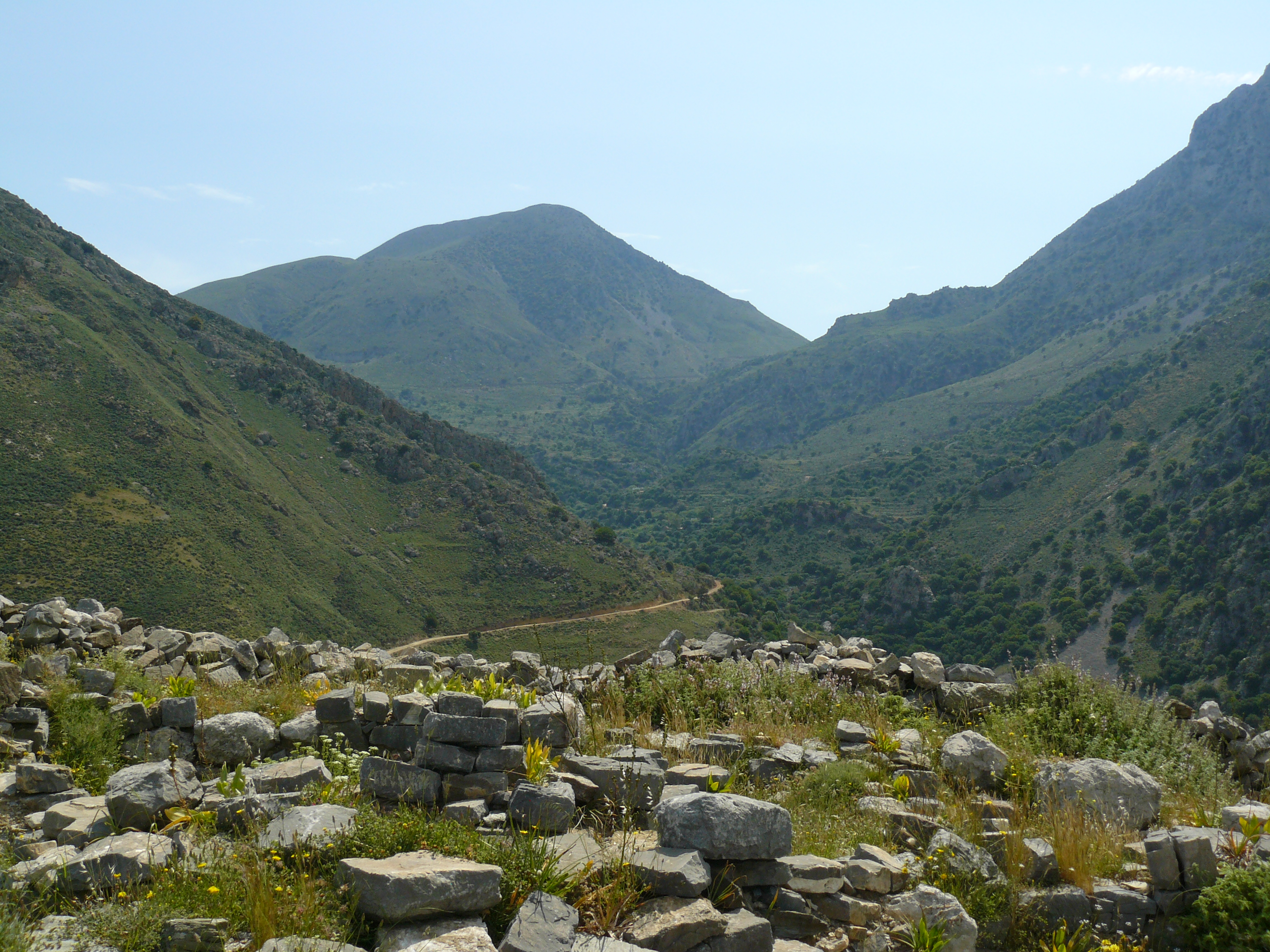
Havgas (or Havga, or Avgo) Gorge near Melisses.

Route 20 meanwhile merges into the coastal Route 90, which heading NE arrives at Kavousi, a city at the mouth of a larger valley dividing west Papouras from Kapsos, max elevation 997 m (3,271 ft), to the north. The valley, called Havgas Gorge, is caused by the Kavousi river, which drains westward from the slopes of Spathi, 1,177 m (3,862 ft) near Melisses, exits the massif at Kavousi, turns northward, and reaches Mirabello Bay at Tholos. Waters come from many tributaries within the gorge, which is extensive, including Mesona Gorge, which conducts water from the slopes of Afentis northward to intersect Havgas Gorge. As one might suspect, the terrain of Havgas permits a single winding road, characterized by numerous hairpin turns, to pass through it on the slopes above the river, going over the pass at its source to Bebonas. The pass is east of Melisses. It goes between Spathi and Kleros, elevation 1,331 m (4,367 ft), and serves as a source for the Bebonas River. It flows eastward, defining the border between Thripti and the Ornon Mountains.

=== North side ===
One might expect that all the peaks north of the Kabousi-Bebonas line would be the Ornon range, but this is not the case. Kapsas, which is about 4.77 km (2.96 mi) long SW-NE and 1.91 km (1.19 mi) wide transversely, is counted as Thrypti by some sources. Geographically, it forms the NW corner of the massif. Other sources count it as part of the Ornon range. The answer to the mystery is geopolitical.

Route 90A encloses the north of Kapsos forming a big bend from Kavousi on the west to Lastros on the east, located near the source of a S-N draining valley with Kapsos on its left and Tsigouni Gorge on its right. The border between Demos Ierapetras and Demos Siteias, however, proceeding N-S from the bay, cutting 90A, runs along the west side of the Kapsos ridge; i.e., it divides the mountain. South of Lastos it veers east to cut Spathi similarly on its upper north flank and also cuts the mountains on the north flank of the Bebonas Valley. This border is the traditional line of demarcation for the two ranges; i.e., half of Kapsos is Thrypti, and the other half Ornon, etc. (Note: Some of the maps invent a "Mount Ornon" and a "Mount Thrypti" from which the ranges were supposedly named. They don't exist and have no real coordinates. The custom perpetuates the convention practised by the ancient geographers of using oros ("mountain"), a singular, to denote a collective, the range.)

== See also ==
- Ha Gorge
- Mesona Gorge
- Milona Gorge
- Orino Gorge
