= Western Siteia Foothills =

Range of foothills to the Ornon Mountains in eastern Crete in Greece

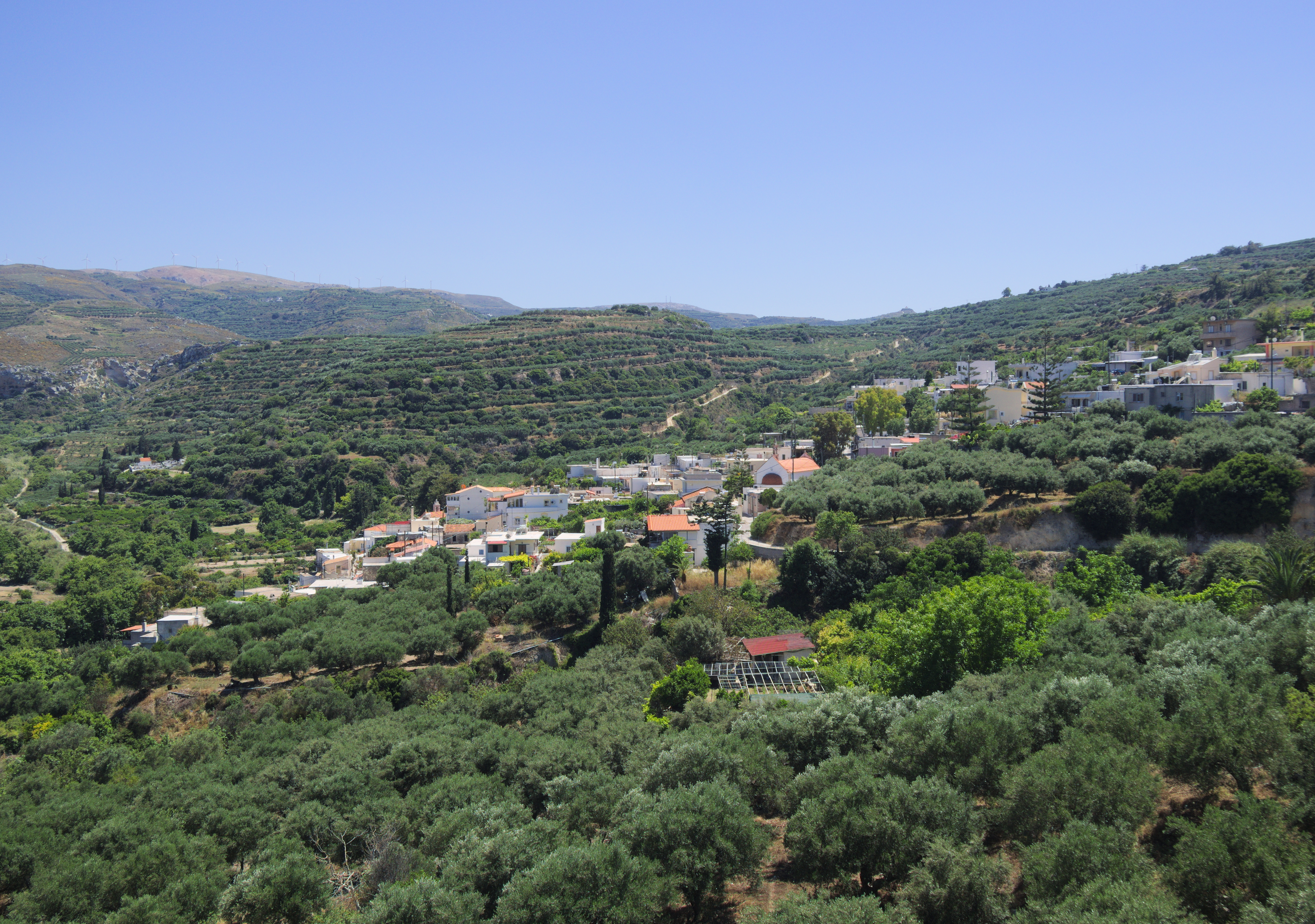
- Maronia, a village of the Western Siteia Foothills

Geography
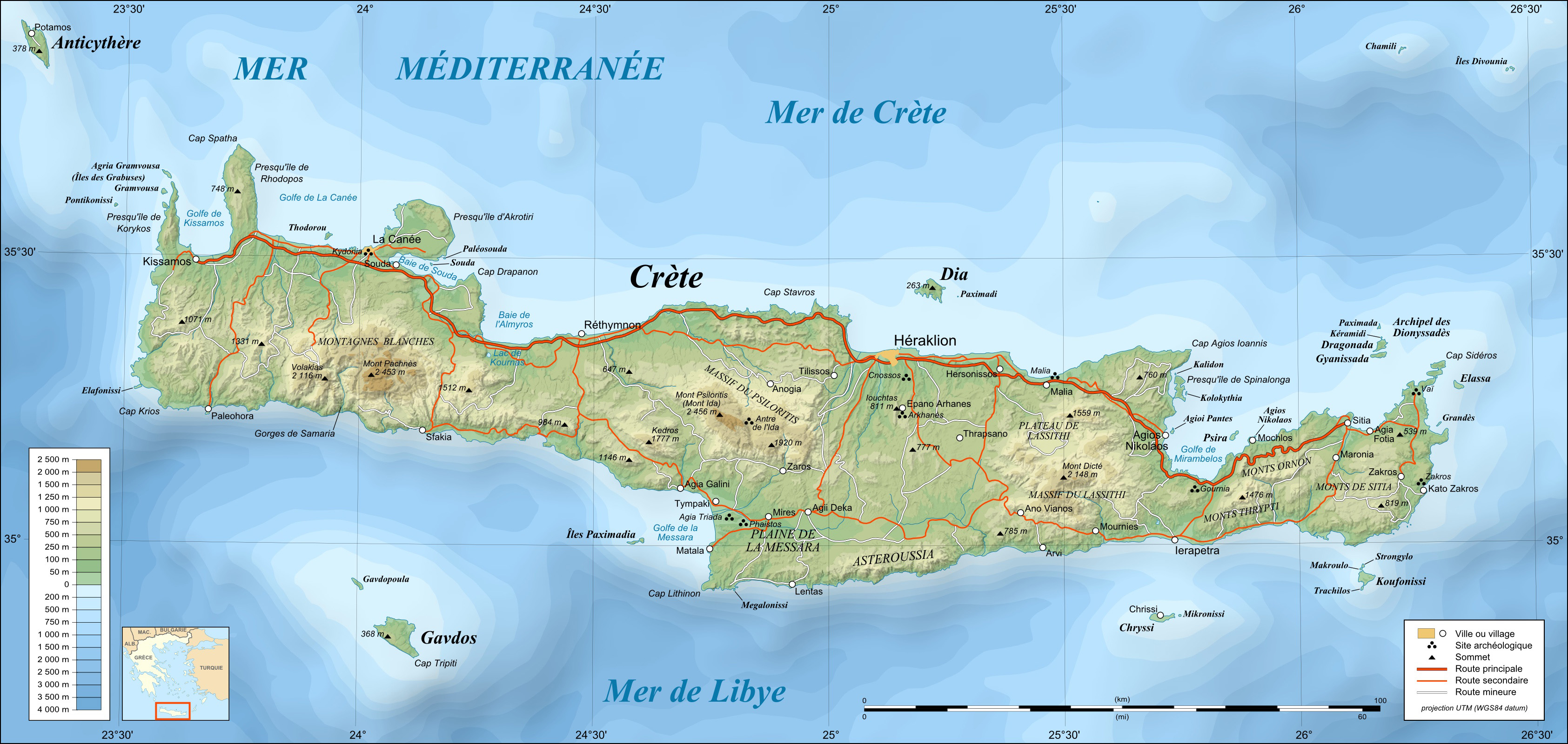
- Terrain map of Crete. For a close-up of eastern Crete, expand image.
- Country: Hellenic Republic
- Region (periphereia): Crete
- Regional unit (periphereiakis enotetas): Lasithi

The Western Siteia Foothills are a range of foothills in Lasithi in eastern Crete, Greece. They are transitional in altitude between the Ornon Mountains, which trends from west to east starting at Kavousi in Ierapetra and ending at Praesos in the east, and the north coastal plain around and west of Sitia. Part of the Sitia Mountains, they complete the SW-NE trending massif of ridges from Ierapetra to the plain of Sitia itself.

Geologically, there is little difference between the Ornon Mountains and their northern foothills, which are west of Sitia. The same ravines cut through them both, draining from the Ornon into the Sea of Crete. The Ornon, however, are nearly uninhabitable for villages, due to their altitudes and steep slopes.

On the northern side, there are no hills greater than 800 m (2,600 ft). This is not a good line of demarcation, however, as the hills are all much lower than 800 m. The occupation line for villages is about the 400 m (1,300 ft) contour line. These villages are in the Western Foothills, not the Ornon range. It so happens that a line drawn along the 400 m contour is parallel to the slightly lower Route E75.

Archaeologists of the early 20th century discovered that the foothills up to the occupation line had been heavily settled by Minoan civilization, which makes sense, because Sitia is a good port, and the Minoans seldom settled the vulnerable coasts but moved up into the mountains valleys, with some notable exceptions, such as the town of Mochlos. Consequently, the Western Siteia Foothills have been excavated at many sites, including such villages as Lastros, Myrsini, Mouliana, Plakalona, and others. The name used by the archaeologists for the hills remains.

== Geography ==
The foothills are entirely in the municipality of Siteia in Lasithi regional unit.

== See also ==
- Richtis Gorge
