= Kalo Chorio, Lasithi =

Kalo Chorio Καλό Χωρίο
- Community
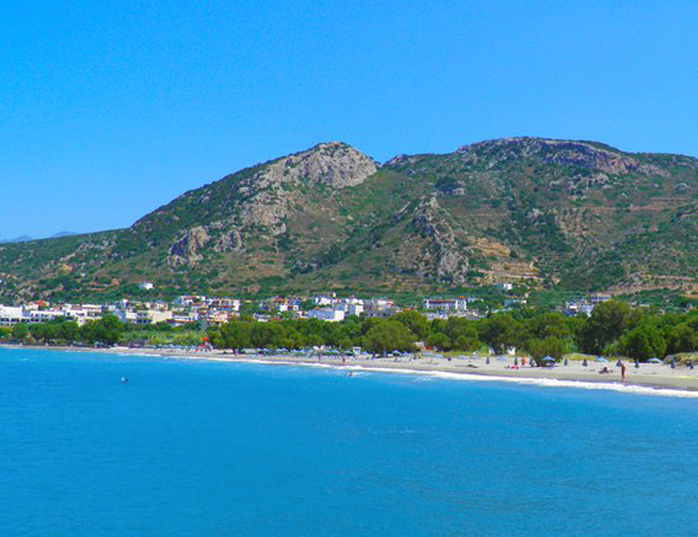

- Location within Greece
- Coordinates: 35°06′54″N 25°43′30″E
- Country: Greece
- Administrative region: Crete
- Regional unit: Lasithi
- Municipality: Agios Nikolaos
- Municipal unit: Agios Nikolaos

Population (2021)
  - Community: 1,197
- Time zone: UTC+2 (EET)
  - Summer (DST): UTC+3 (EEST)

Kalo Chorio (Greek: Καλό Χωρίο, "good village") is a village in the municipality of Agios Nikolaos, Lasithi, Crete, Greece. Kalo Chorio village has a population of around 900, nestled in the midst of a verdant hilly landscape, where olive groves, abundant and colorful mediterranean shrubs and plants reach all the way down to the sea. Over the past years, naturally with tourism, part of the village has grown nearer to the beach. Istro has many archaeological points of interest. The new village of Istro sits on the site of the ancient town of Istron, remains of which are still being uncovered to date. Because of this, the land closest to the sea has a conservation order and no new building may take place, which leaves the beaches uncrowded and unspoiled. The beaches of Istro Bay are regularly awarded a Blue flag for cleanliness. Kalo Chorio has a village atmosphere away from the sprawling concrete covered resorts usually found in Crete, making it popular amongst tourists who wish to enjoy Crete as it once was.

== Beaches in Kalo Chorio ==
Kalo Chorio has three main beaches all within 1 kilometer of the village. With clean waters, the beaches range from fine sand to pebble and all beaches in Kalo Chorio have modern facilities including cafes, sunbed rentals and bathrooms. Within a 10 kilometer radius of Kalo Chorio are at least another 10 blue flag awarded beaches, all accessible by cheap and regular bus services from the numerous bus stops in Kalo Chorio. It is also possible to choose to explore and discover private and sheltered coves along the coastline of Kalo Chorio.

== Shopping and Nightlife ==
Due to its status as a working village Kalo Chorio is not a heavily developed tourist resort. It has only three large hotels, and a few smaller apartment style accommodation facilities. This undeveloped status has helped Kalo Chorio maintain its traditional feel. It is a small village and resort with a dozen tavernas and half a dozen bars, snack bars and cafes (all with internet access), there is also a fairly new aqua pool with bar and restaurant located near Golden Beach. These establishments cater for tourists, the growing ex-pat community and locals alike.

== Weather in Kalo Chorio ==
The climate of Kalo Chorio, and surrounding areas, is primarily temperate. The atmosphere in Kalo Chorio can be quite humid at times due to the proximity to the sea, but it is not un-pleasant like in many other resorts around the Mediterranean, while winter is fairly mild. During the Cretan summer, average temperatures in Kalo Chorio reach the high 20s-low 30s Celsius (mid 80s to mid 90s Fahrenheit), though the maximum temperature of Kalo Chorio can reach the upper 30s-mid 40s though during August.

== Archaeology ==
This area contains several ancient archaeological sites going back to 3000 BC. Among them are Priniatikos Pyrgos, Vrokastro, and Vasiliki, Lasithi. There's an Archaeological Museum in nearby Agios Nikolaos, Crete.

== Football in Kalo Chorio ==
Kalo Chorio is represented at the local football by the Athlitikos Omilos Pyrgos Kalou Choriou ( Tower of Kalo Chorio Athletic Club ). The team takes part in the 1st Division of the local Lasithi Football League. The club uses the local communal football grass field for training and its league matches.
