= Isthmus of Ierapetra =

Land bridge connecting Siteia with the rest of Crete

Coordinates: 35.071°N 25.764°E

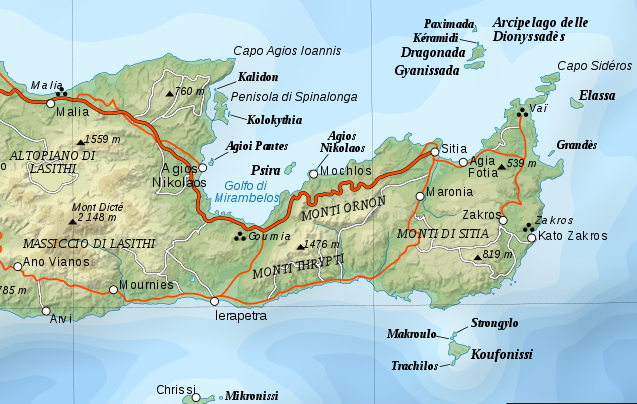
The isthmus of Ierapetra.

The Isthmus of Ierapetra (Ισθμός της Ιεράπετρας) is a strip of land on the Greek island of Crete which connects the easternmost municipality, Siteia, to the rest of the island. Its name comes from the largest settlement, Ierapetra (Ιεράπετρα), which is situated on the south coast.

== Geography ==
The isthmus is the narrowest part of Crete, with a distance of 12 kilometres from the Gulf of Mirabello in the north to the Libyan Sea in the south. It is flanked by mountain ranges on the east and west. The imposing Ha Gorge (Φαρράγι Χά), located on the Thrypti Mountains, overlooks the isthmus from the eastern side.

== Archaeology ==
A number of archaeological sites are dotted around the isthmus. The bronze age site of Vasiliki (Βασιλική), in the middle of the isthmus, lends its name to an early form of Minoan pottery found primarily on the site. Other Minoan sites in the vicinity include Gournia, Priniatikos Pyrgos and Chalasmenos (Χαλάσμένος). The Neolithic refuge site of Monastiraki Katalimata (Μοναστηράκι Καταλύματα) is located high up on the northern side of the Ha Gorge.

== Politics ==
The isthmus falls within the jurisdiction of Ierapetra Municipality (Δήμος Ιεράπετρας), in the Lassithi regional unit.

== Gallery ==
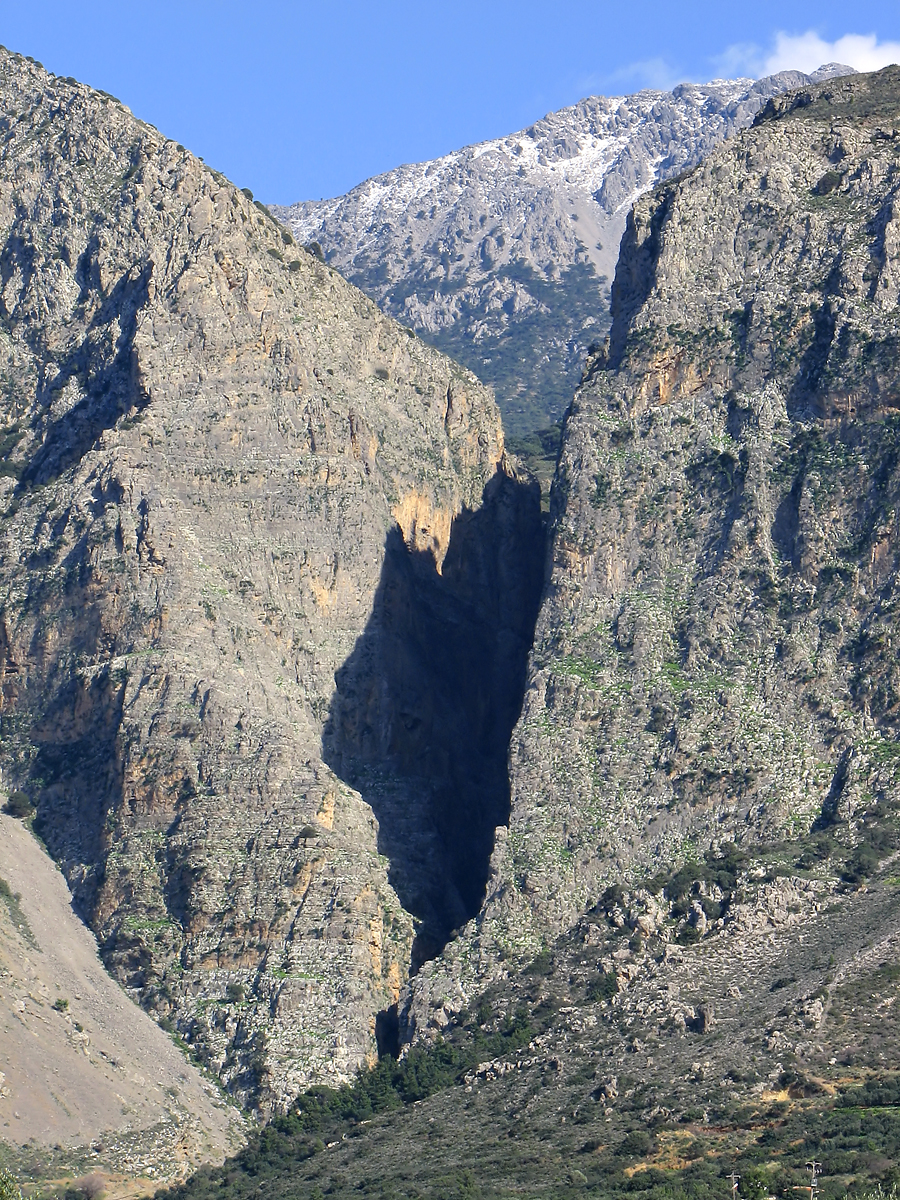
The Ha Gorge, located in the Thrypti mountains east of the isthmus

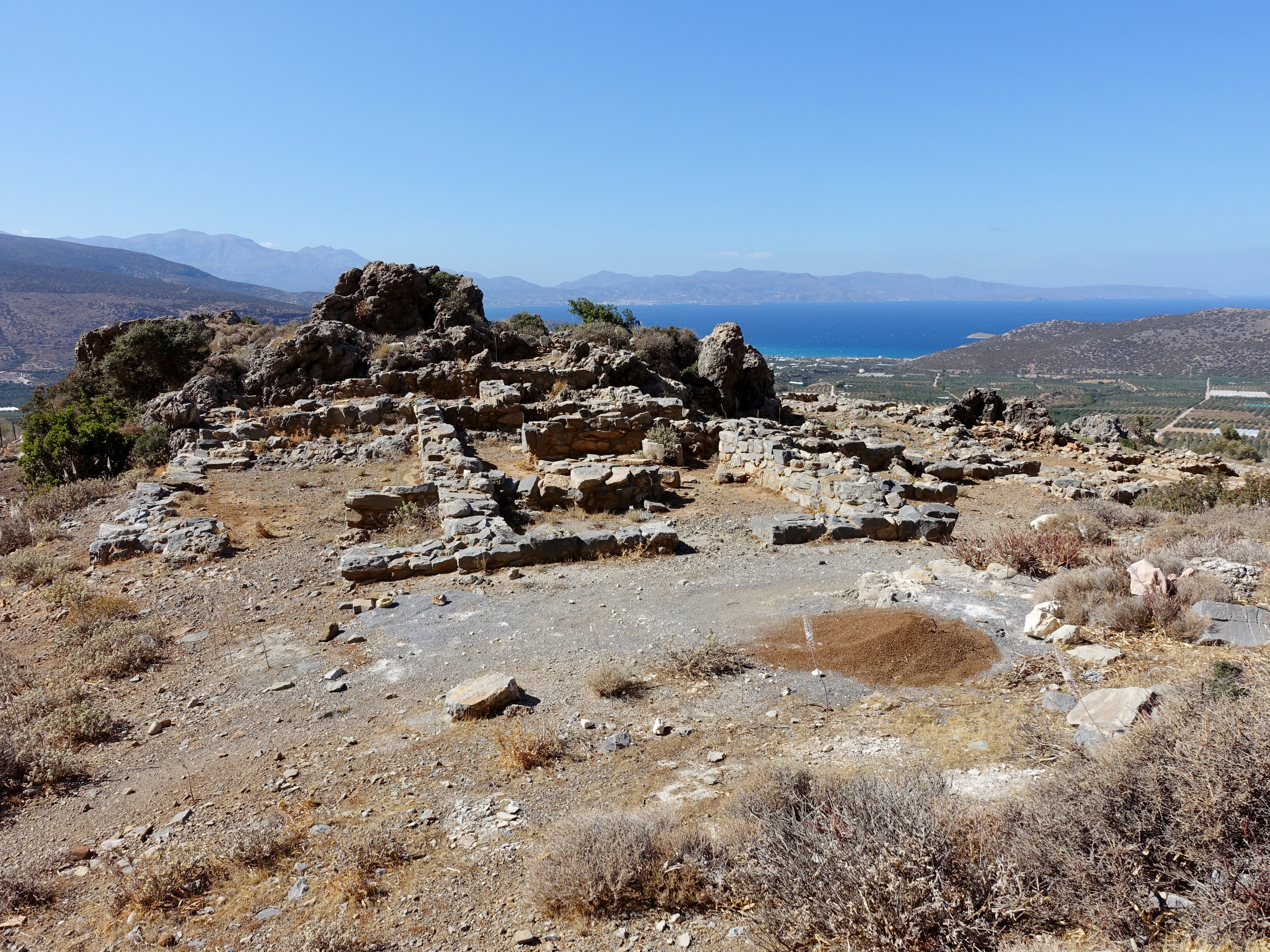
The ruins of Monasteraki Chalasmenos, situated on a hill at the foot of the Thrypti mountains. In the background are the isthmus, the Dikti Mountains and the Mirabello Gulf
