= Vrokastro =

Ancient civilization in Greece

Coordinates: 35.1199°N 25.7447°E

Vrokastro was an ancient Minoan civilization settlement in the Lasithi regional unit of eastern Crete, Greece. It overlooks the Gulf of Mirabello.

The site was a mountain citadel located on a hill 1,5 km east of Priniatikos Pyrgos, another very early archaeological site. Nearby, there's a small resort town of Kalo Chorio, Lasithi.

Yet another important archaeological site in the area is Vasiliki, Lasithi. There's an Archaeological Museum in nearby Agios Nikolaos, Crete.

== History ==
Vrokastro bridges the end of the Bronze Age and the beginning of the early Iron Age. It was first inhabited during the Middle Minoan period (ca. 2100 to 1700), then reoccupied at the end of the Bronze Age (ca. 1250 B.C.), and continuously inhabited until the seventh century B.C.

== Archaeology ==
In 1910-1912, American archaeologist Edith Hall Dohan, of the University of Pennsylvania Museum excavated here the ruins of a Minoan period settlement. She uncovered a Middle Minoan and Early Iron Age settlement on the peak and north slope, elevation 300 m. Hall excavated burials from 1200 B.C. to 700/650 BC.

This site may have been inhabited until the Geometric Period (11th-8th centuries BC) and a little later.

Scholars believe that the latest burials from the corbel-vaulted tombs at Vrokastro probably are concurrent with the central Cretan Protogeometric Style.

New work is being done at the site by archaeologists recently. A new Vrokastro Survey Project was initiated by Dr. Barbara J. Hayden (Senior Research Scientist, Mediterranean Section, University of Pennsylvania Museum).

== Bibliography ==
- HALL, E. 1914. Excavations in Eastern Crete: Vrokastro, University of Pennsylvania, The University Museum Anthropological Publications III, iii, Philadelphia: University of Pennsylvania Museum.
- Hayden, B.J. 1983. "New Plans of the Early Iron Age Settlement of Vrokastro," Hesperia 52, 367-387.
- HAYDEN, B.J., and MOODY, J.A. 1990. The Vrokastro Survey Project, Providing a Context for an Early Iron Age Site. Expedition 32: 42-53.
- HAYDEN, B.J., MOODY, J.A. and RACKHAM, O. 1992. The Vrokastro Survey Project, 1986-1989: Research Design and Preliminary Results. Hesperia 61: 293-353.
- B. J. Hayden, Reports on the Vrokastro Area, Eastern Crete 1: Catalogue of Pottery from the Bronze and Early Iron Age Settlement of Vrokastro in the Collections of the University of Pennsylvania Museum of Archaeology and Anthropology and the Archaeological Museum, Herakleion, Crete [University Museum Monograph 113] (Philadelphia 2003).
- B. J. Hayden, Reports on the Vrokastro Area, Eastern Crete 2: The Settlement History of the Vrokastro Area and Related Studies [University Museum Monograph 119] (Philadelphia 2004).
- B. J. Hayden, Reports on the Vrokastro Area, Eastern Crete 3: The Vrokastro Regional Survey Project, Sites and Pottery [University Museum Monograph 123] (Philadelphia 2005).
