= Juraj Červenák =

Slovak fantasy writer

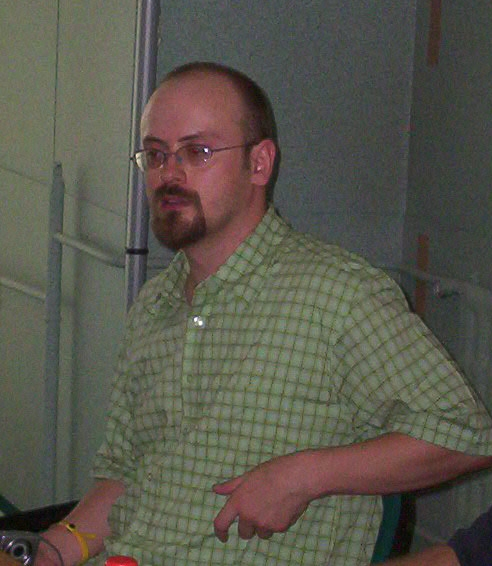
- Born: June 16, 1974 (age 52); Žiar nad Hronom, Czechoslovakia (now Slovakia)
- Occupations: Novelist, Short story writer, Film critic
- Writing career
- Pen name: Thorleif Larssen
- Genres: Historical fantasy, Historical mystery, Sword and Sorcery, Westerns, Horror
- Website: cervenak.sk

Juraj Červenák (born June 16, 1974) is a Slovak author. He was originally best known for his short stories and novels which mix elements of sword and sorcery with historical fantasy and Slavic mythology, but later achieved mainstream success with a series of novels in the historical mystery genre, featuring a pair of fictional late 16th/ early 17th century detectives, Joachim Stein and Matej Barbarič.

He has published (under the pseudonym Thorleif Larssen) several novels featuring Robert E. Howard's classic character Conan the Barbarian, as well as (under his own name) the Warlock trilogy, a set of historical fantasy novels following the adventures of the Slavic warlock Rogan in the historical setting of the 8th century Principality of Nitra and neighboring lands.

Červenák's short stories range from themes similar to those used in his novels to westerns and horrors and can be found in various (mostly Czech) anthologies, Slovak science fiction/fantasy magazine Fantázia and Czech magazines Ikarie and Pevnost. Most of Červenák's early books were published in Czech translation prior to publication of their original Slovak versions; this changed in 2010, when the first of his historical novels was picked up by a major Slovak publisher.

== Biography ==
Juraj Červenák was born on June 16, 1974, in Žiar nad Hronom, Slovakia, but spent most of his life in the town of Banská Štiavnica. After graduating from secondary school he went through a series of odd jobs, finally settling in a position at the town's cultural center, where his duties included managing the local cinema. He ultimately made writing (as a novelist, short story writer and film critic for various magazines) his full-time career in 2005.

== Writing career ==
Červenák's early works, published under the pseudonym 'Thorleif Larssen', were moderately successful with readers but largely dismissed by critics as derivative of his literary influences (most notably Howard) and lacking in inventiveness and sophistication.

After Tollrander, Červenák went on a nearly four-year writing and publishing hiatus, from which he emerged in 1998 with a short story called "Mŕtvi striebro nepotrebujú" (Dead Men Need No Silver), published in the Fantázia magazine.

The short story introduced a new protagonist, Rogan the Warlock, along with his wolf-demon companion, Goryvlad, in an original world of high fantasy based on Slavic history and mythology. The readers' response was favorable and more short stories followed. "Krvavý oheň, biely oheň" (Blood Fire, White Fire), published a year later, received the O najlepšiu fantasy (Best Fantasy) Award.

Červenák returned to writing novels with 2000's Conan nelítostný (Conan The Relentless) (writing as Thorleif Larssen once again) and collected two more prestigious awards, Istron for "Z posvátné vody zrozená" (Born Of The Sacred Water) in 2002 and Raketa for "Hrdlorez" (Cutthroat) in 2003.

2003 saw the publication of the first in the Warlock series of novels, Černokněžník – Vládce vlků (Warlock – The Master of Wolves). It was the first book to be published under Červenák's own name and marked his embrace of historical fantasy, as it brought Rogan into the historical setting of Central Europe at the turn of the 8th century. The novel earned positive reviews and was followed by two sequels (2004, 2005) and a short story collection (2006).

Červenák then moved on to a historical fantasy trilogy based on Bylinas; the first novel, Bohatier: Oceľové žezlo (Bogatyr: The Iron Scepter), describing the exploits of the legendary hero Ilya Muromets was published in 2007, followed by two sequels in 2007 and 2008. In 2009, Červenák wrote Strážcovia Varadína (The Guardians of Oradea), the first in a series of historical adventure novels following the exploits of the fictional captain Kornélius Báthory in the late 17th century, against the backdrop of the various conflicts between the Ottoman Empire and the Habsburgs. The novel was picked up by one of Slovakia's major publishers, Slovart, marking the beginning of Červenák's crossover success with mainstream readers.

This trend was further cemented by a series of historical mystery novels, featuring a pair of fictional detectives, Joachim Stein and Matej Barbarič, on a quest to solve crimes in the late 16th/early 17th century Habsburg Empire under special orders from Archduke Matthias of Austria. In contrast to Červenák's previous work, the bestselling series features next to no fantasy elements, and, apart from inserting a few fictional characters, stays true to actual historical events.

== Bibliography ==
=== The Warlock series ===
- The Master of Wolves (Vládce vlků, Czech edition 2003, Slovak edition 2010 as Vládca vlkov, Polish edition 2012 as Władca Wilków)
- The Sword of Radhost (Radhostův meč, Czech edition 2004, Slovak edition 2010 as Radhostov meč, Polish edition 2014 as Miecz Radogosta)
- The Blood Fire (Krvavý oheň, Czech edition 2005, Slovak edition 2011)
- The War on Demons (Válka s běsy, Czech edition 2006, Slovak edition 2011 as Vojna s besmi)
- The Gold of Arkona (Zlato Arkony, 2012)
- Apparitions on Devín (Prízraky na Devíne, 2016)

=== The Bogatyr series ===
- The Iron Scepter (Ocelové žezlo, Czech edition 2006, Polish edition 2012 as Żelazny Kostur)
- The Dragon Empress (Dračí carevna, Czech edition 2007, Polish edition 2013 as Smocza Cesarzowa)
- The White Tower (Bílá věž, Czech edition 2008)

=== The Bivoj novels ===
- Bivoj the Demonslayer (Bivoj běsobijce, Czech edition 2008)
- Bivoj the Warrior (Bivoj válečník, Czech edition 2008)

=== The Adventures of Captain Bathory series ===
- The Guardians of Oradea (Strážcové Varadínu, Czech edition 2009, Slovak edition 2010 as Strážcovia Varadína)
- The Gate of Irkalla (Brána Irkally, 2010)
- The Devil's Fortress (Diablova pevnosť, 2011)
- The Iron Crescent (Železný polmesiac, 2015)
- The Rampart of the West (Hradba západu, 2018)

=== The Stein and Barbarič series ===
- The Corpse on the Helltop (Mŕtvy na pekelnom vrchu, 2013)
- The Blood of the Firstborn (Krv prvorodených, 2014)
- The Fiery Omen (Ohnivé znamenie, 2015)
- The Devil in the Mirror (Diabol v zrkadle, 2016)
- The Wolf and the Dagger (Vlk a dýka, 2017)
- The Forest of Apparitions (Les prízrakov, 2019)
- The Angel in the Underground

(Anjel v podsvetí, 2020)

=== Conan novels ===
- Conan and the Shadows of Hyrth (Conan a stíny Hyrthu, 1993) (as George Callahan)
- Conan the Relentless (Juraj Červenák novel) (Conan nelítostný, 2000) (as Thorleif Larssen)
- Conan and the Twelve Gates of Hell (Conan a dvanáct bran pekla, 2002) (as Thorleif Larssen)

=== Other novels ===
- Olgerd: The Sword from Thormaren (Olgerd: Meč z Thormarenu, Czech edition 1993) (as Thorleif Larssen)
- Tollrander: The Jewel of the Enchanted Wizard (Tollrander: Klenot zakletého čaroděje, Czech edition 1994) (as Thorleif Larssen)
- Mark Stone: The Holy War (Mark Stone: Svatá válka, Czech edition 2006)
- The Axe of Bronze, the Fleece of Gold (Sekera z bronzu, rúno zo zlata, 2008, Czech edition 2009)
- Rattlesnake Callahan and the Gate of Ghosts (Chřestýš Callahan a brána duchů, Czech edition 2012)

=== Other works ===
- Stone and Blood (Kámen a krev, Czech edition 2010), collection of short stories and novellas (also from Warlock, Bogatyr, Bivoj, and Bathory series)

English titles of any actual future translations may differ.
