= Dušan Fabian =

Dušan D. Fabian
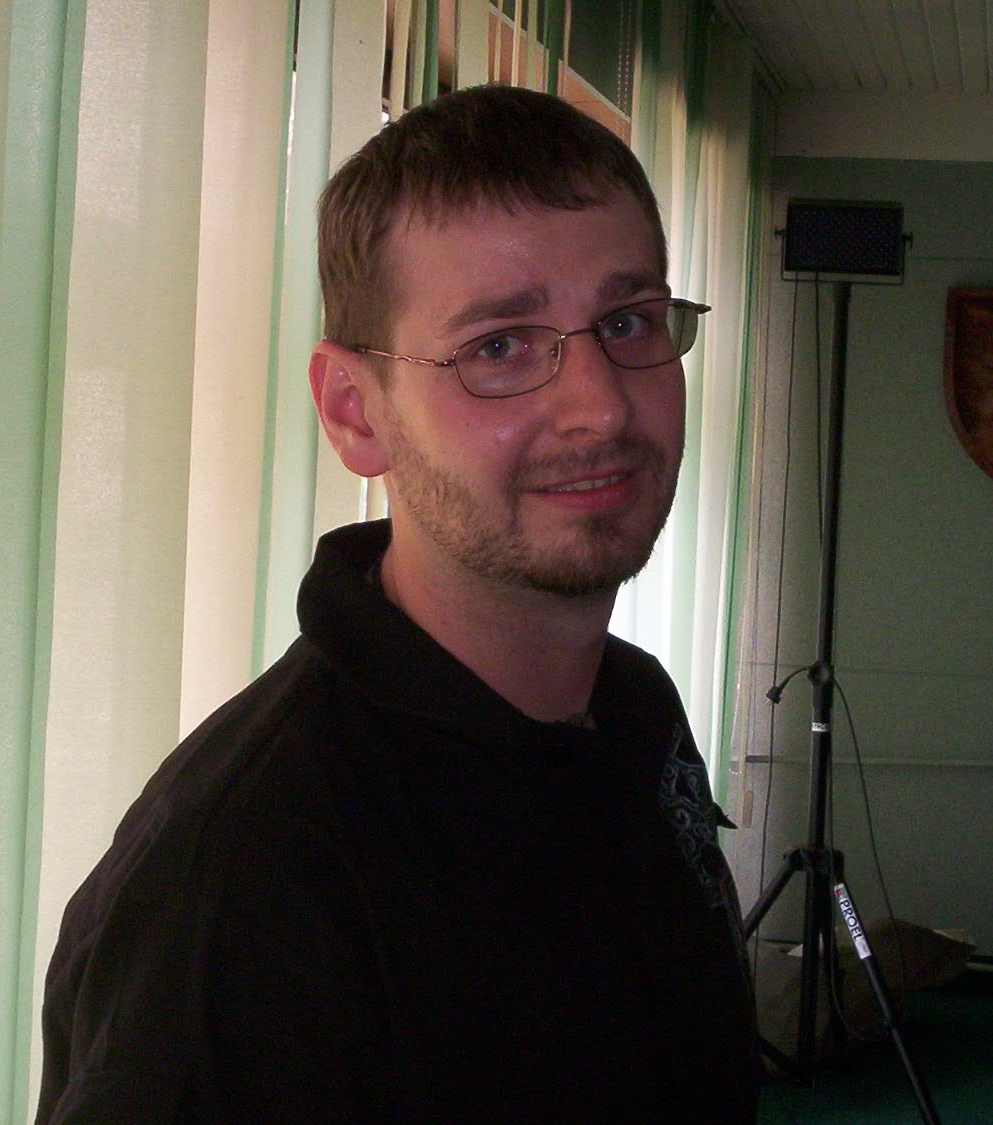
- Dušan D. Fabian
- Born: 10 November 1975 (age 50); Košice, Slovakia
- Occupations: Novelist, Short story writer, Researcher at the Slovak Academy of Sciences
- Writing career
- Genres: Horror, Dark fantasy, Urban fantasy

Dušan "Duke" Fabian (born 10 November 1975) is a Slovak horror and dark fantasy writer. He has published his first novel Invocatio Elementalium in 2006, followed by a loose sequel Pestis Draconum in 2008, as well as several short stories. The awards he has received include Istron for best short story in 2006 and the 2006 European Science Fiction Society Encouragement Award.

== Biography ==
Dušan Fabian was born on 10 November 1975 in Košice, Slovakia, where he has lived ever since. After earning a doctor's degree in veterinary medicine, he went on to work full-time as a researcher at the Institute of Animal Physiology of the Slovak Academy of Sciences.

== Writing career ==
Fabian first rose to prominence in the Slovak fantasy and horror scene with the publication of his short story "Migréna" (Migraine) which brought Lovecraftian horror into the setting of rural eastern Slovakia. It was published in the Krutohlav 2001 anthology, a collection of year's best Slovak science fiction, fantasy and horror stories and received the 2001 Béla Award for best horror short story. Most of his subsequent shorter works were published in the Fantázia magazine, including the notable stories "Tri čierne utorky" (Three Black Tuesdays, later also translated to Polish) and "V predvečer prvého mája" (On the Eve of May Day) for which he was awarded the Istron Award in 2006.

Fabian's debut novel, Invocatio Elementalium, was published in book form in Czech translation in 2006, while the original Slovak version was serialized in four parts in the Fantázia magazine, issues 36-39 in July 2006 through April 2007. Polish translation was published by Dark Horse in two volumes as Rytual in 2007. The novel tells the story of a white-collar bank officer, David Ábel, who is forced to abandon his uneventful lifestyle after becoming accidental victim of a curse cast by a demon from the astral plane. The book earned mostly positive reviews, with comparisons being drawn between Fabian's work and the novels of Sergey Lukyanenko and Neil Gaiman; however, some critics found the novel unbalanced and lacking the more tight and dynamic structure of his shorter works.

Invocatio Elementalium has been shortlisted for the 2006 Czech and Slovak Academy of Science Fiction, Fantasy and Horror Award in the best Czech or Slovak book category in March 2007.

Fabian's latest work, Pestis Draconum, a loose sequel to Invocatio Elementalium featuring the protagonist of the former novel, was published in Czech translation on 26 May 2008 by Brokilon.

== Critical reception ==
Pestis Draconum was the subject of a negative book review by literary critic Peter F. 'Rius Jílek in the Slovak SF magazine Fantázia (3/2009). The review also opened a discussion on qualities of Slovak fantasy literature.

== Works ==
=== Novels ===
- Invocatio Elementalium Wales, 2006.
- Pestis Draconum Brokilon, 2008.
- Živého mě nedostanou! / They won't get me alive! Brokilon, 2010.
