= Priniatikos Pyrgos =

Archaeological site in Greece

Coordinates: 35°7′40″N 25°43′52″E

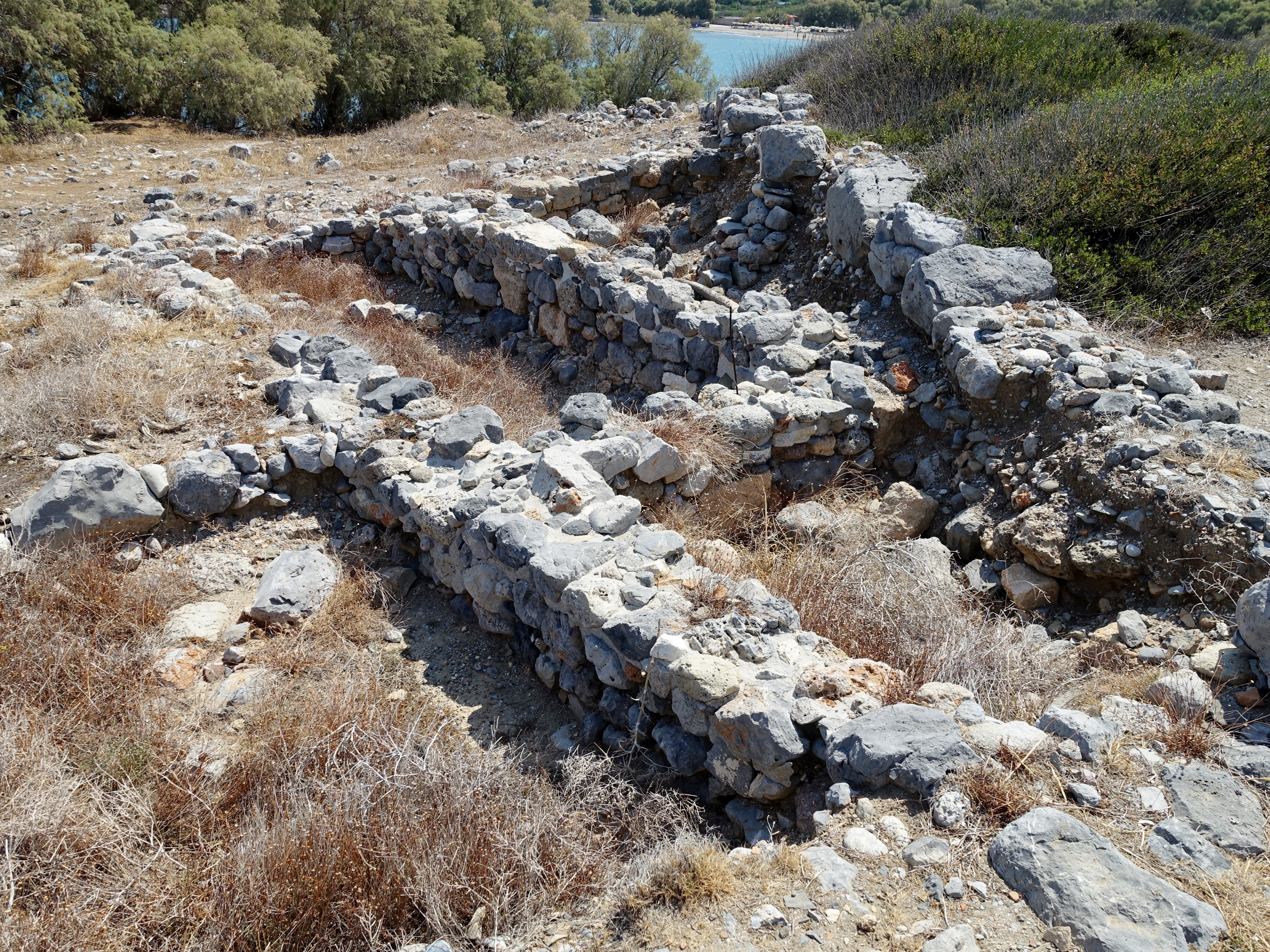
Archaeological site of Priniatikos Pyrgos

Priniatikos Pyrgos is an archaeological site near the Istron River in the eastern Cretan regional unit of Lasithi (Greece). The nearest big town is Agios Nikolaos, Crete. The site is on a coastal promontory. It appears to have been first settled in the Final Neolithic, circa 3000 BC. Nearby, there's a small resort town of Kalo Chorio, Lasithi. It is not to be confused with Myrtos Pyrgos on the south coast.

== History ==
Activity on the site continued throughout the Minoan Bronze Age and the Classical Greek (polis-town of Istron) and Roman periods to Byzantine and Venetian periods, spanning up to 4,000 years. The site may have been a harbour settlement, an industrial area, a cult area or any combination of such functions, which may have changed throughout its long occupation. Since 2007, Priniatikos Pyrgos has been undergoing excavation by an international team under the auspices of the Irish Institute of Hellenic Studies at Athens.

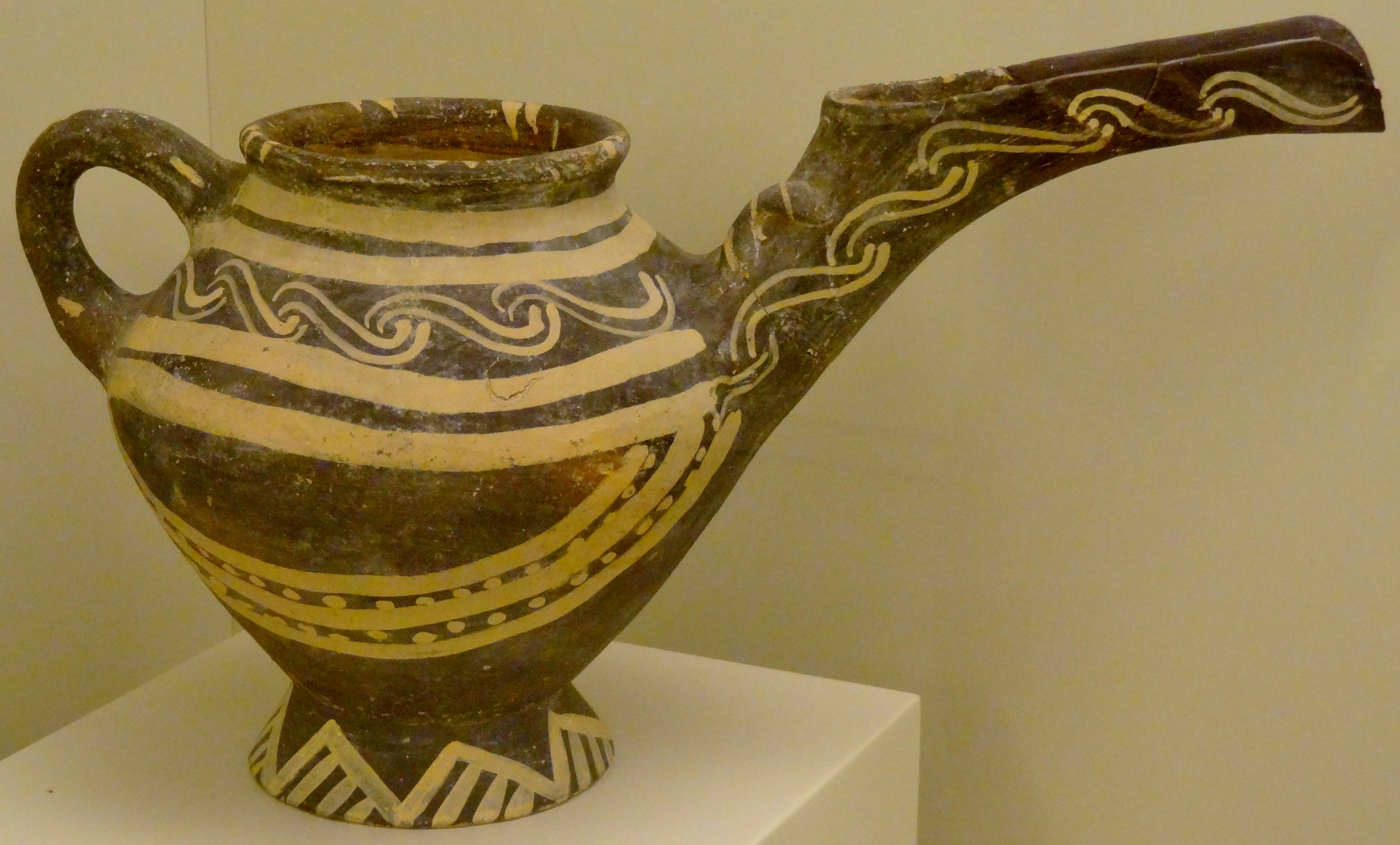
Vasiliki style vessel, 2300–2000 BC. Heraklion Archaeological Museum

Another important archaeological site nearby is Vasiliki, Lasithi, roughly contemporary with Pyrgos. Vasiliki gave its name to a type of early pottery known as Vasiliki ware. Much Vasiliki ware was excavated at Priniatikos Pyrgos.

== Earlier excavations ==
Edith Hayward Hall (Dohan) of the University of Pennsylvania Museum pioneered archaeological work in eastern Crete. She excavated the Bronze and Early Iron Age refuge settlement of Vrokastro (2 km east of Pirgos), above the river Istron Valley. After that, in 1912, she started a brief excavation on the coastal promontory of Priniatikos Pyrgos, where she believed a Minoan harbor town was located. This small-scale excavation yielded large quantities of fine Minoan pottery from the Early and Late Minoan periods (3000-1000 BCE). She also discovered a large Roman settlement in the area.

Minoan vases that she excavated at the site have been published. They are now in the Mediterranean collection of the University of Pennsylvania Museum.

== See also ==
- Mary Hamilton Swindler

== Bibliography ==
- B. J. Hayden, Y. Bassiakos, T. Kalpaxis, A. Sarris, and M. Tsipopoulou, “A New Exploration of Priniatikos Pyrgos: Primary Harbor Settlement and Emporium of the Vrokastro Survey Region,” in P. P. Betancourt, M. C. Nelson, and H. Williams (eds.), Krinoi kai Limenes: Studies in Honor of Joseph and Maria Shaw (Philadelphia 2007) 93-100.
