= Ha Gorge =

Gorge in Crete, Greece

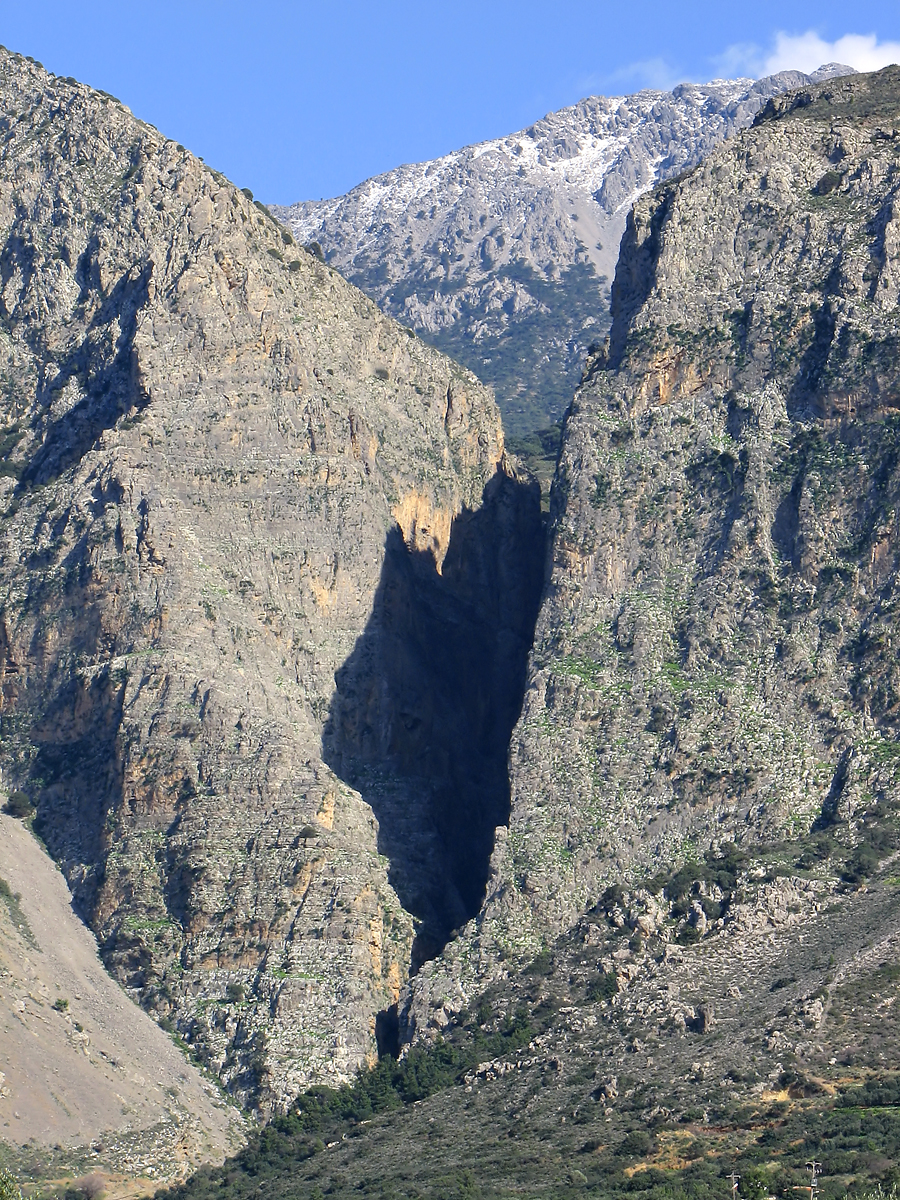
- The exit of Ha Gorge through the western wall of the Thrypti range. In the background is Afentis, tallest peak of the range.

Geography
- Coordinates: 35.085°N 25.835°E
- Interactive map of Ha Gorge

Ha Gorge (Greek: Φαράγγι Χά) is a narrow gorge, at the Monasteraki Dakos, on the eastern part of the island of Crete in Greece. It is located in the west slope of Thrypti mountain range, and exits east of Vasiliki village in the plain of Ierapetra. From this location scenic views overlook Pahia Amos and the bay. Being practically inaccessible to people, the gorge maintains a rich and diverse flora and fauna. Its depth is about 1,000 metres (3,300 ft) and the fissure is said to be one of the largest in the world. Late Minoan IIIC sites are in the area.

== Etymology ==
The name 'Ha Gorge' is derived from the Greek Cretan dialect hasko (Greek: χάσκω) meaning "separate" or "to gape".

== Location ==
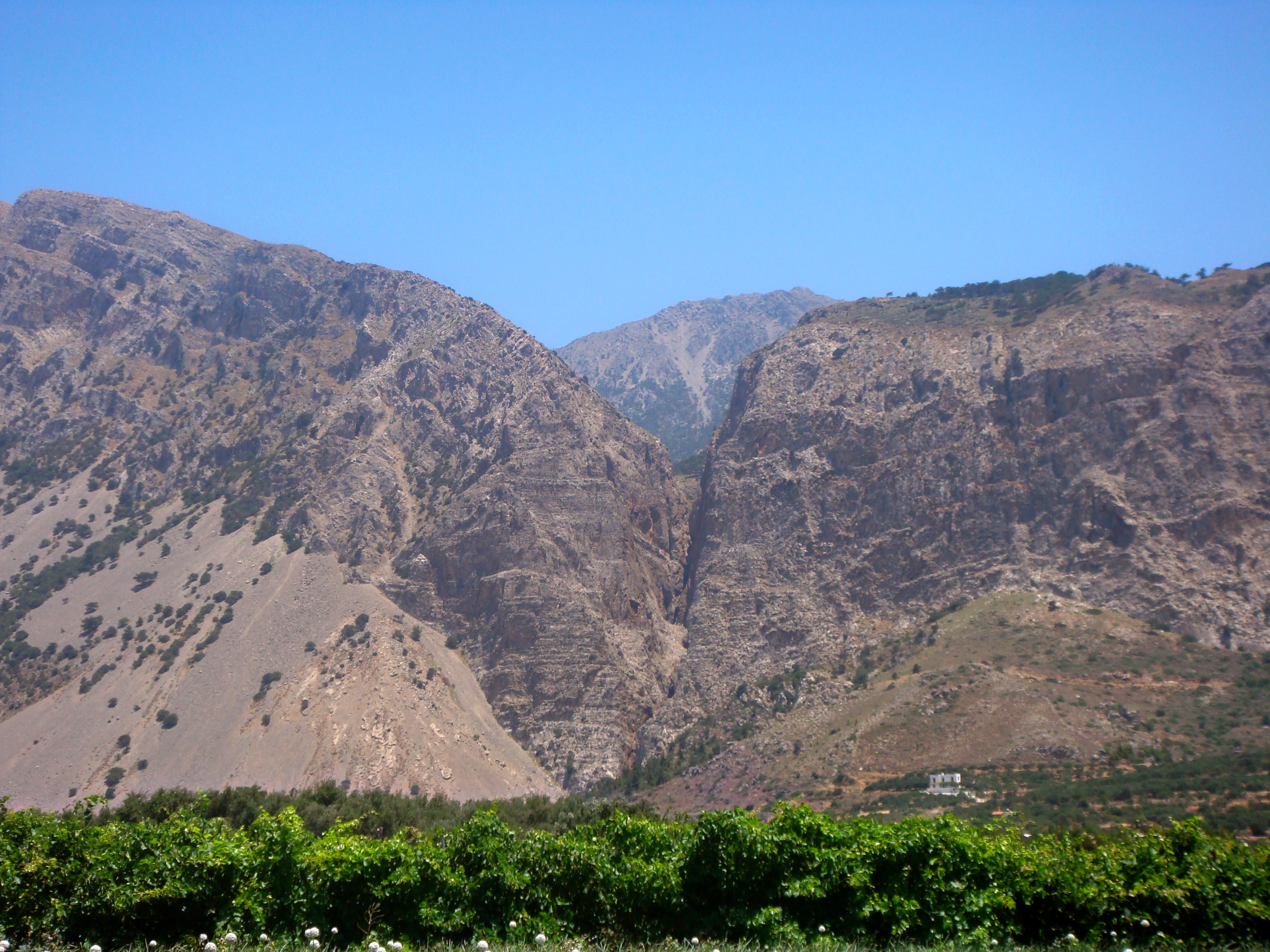
Ha Gorge

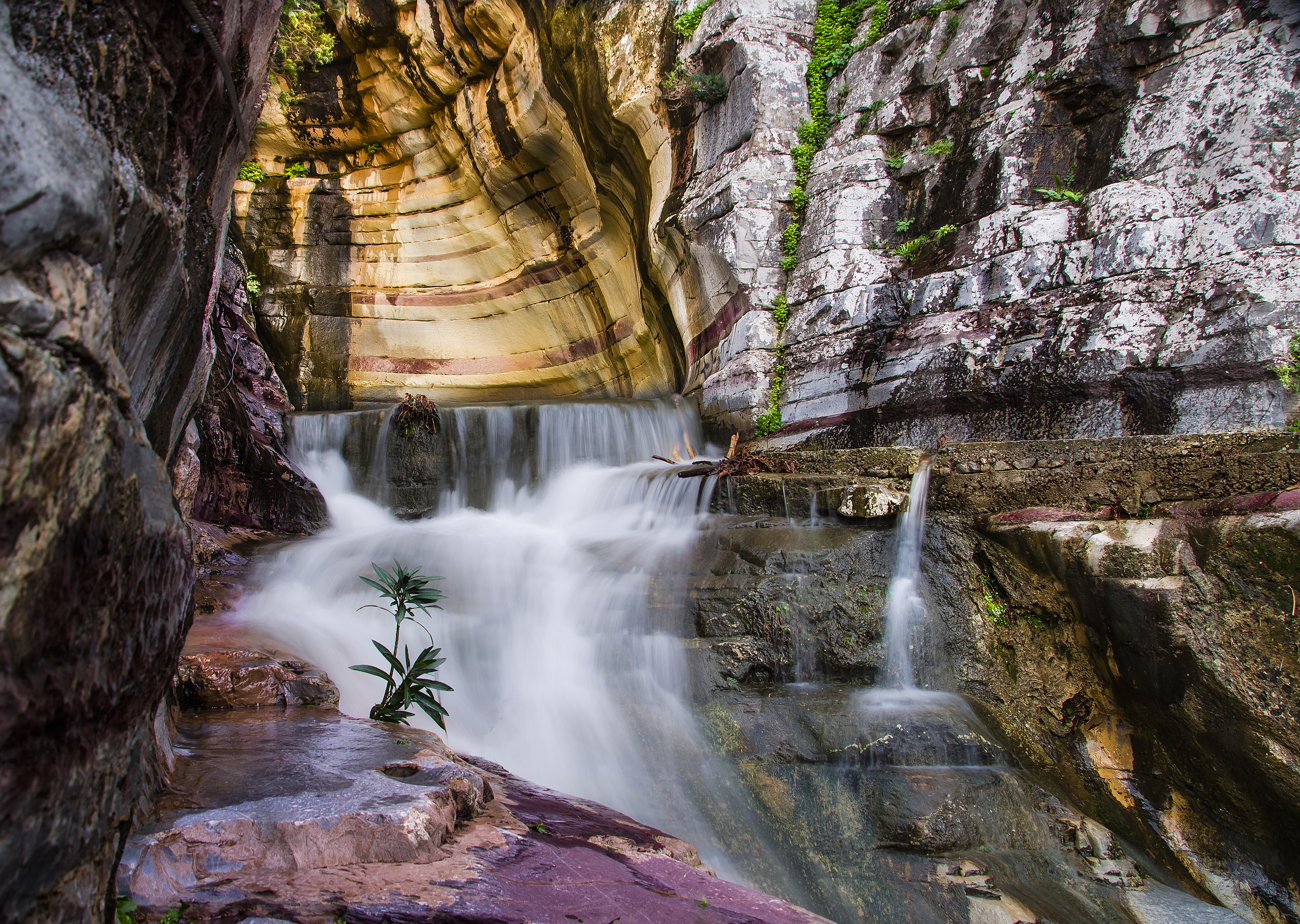
Detail of the exit of the gorge

The gorge is located on the north end of the Isthmus of Hierapetra. Access to the geological fault is very difficult. The road approach to the gorge is 110 kilometres (68 mi) along the national highway from Iraklio to Agios Nikolaos and then the approach leads through Ierapetra and the village of Episkopi. From this village, a diversion road over a distance of 10 kilometres (6.2 mi) leads to the Thripti, a location of a church. From this location access to the gorge is only by walking.

== Features ==
The gorge has an elevation of 370 metres (1,210 ft) at the entrance where the width is about 3 metres (9.8 ft). It is about 1.5 kilometres (0.93 mi) long, particularly narrow at several points and has rocky walls rising up to 300 metres (980 ft), in cascade form. The gorge splits "at right angles a fault-cliff which divides east Crete". The width of the gorge varies from 6–10 metres (20–33 ft); at some locations it is as narrow as 1.5 metres (4 ft 11 in). Its depth is about 1,000 metres (3,300 ft) and the fissure is said to be one of the largest in the world. It has a number of falls along its length out of which a fall of 250 m is the steepest.

The geological formations created by this wide fault exposes the rock-beds and their folds which are identical on both banks of the gorge. Geologically it is interpreted as a "r Tectonics" active normal fault, known as the Ierapetra active fault with a northeast–southwest orientation.

The stream emerging from the gorge is diverted to drive two watermills. Abseiling is conducted in the vicinity; the gorge has 26 abseils of varying length from 10–45 metres (33–148 ft).

=== Archeological excavations ===
Archeological excavations in the vicinity of Ha gorge have revealed Late Neolithic-Final Neolithic (4000 BC -3000BC) occupation on the Monastiraki Katalimata, which is precariously located at the edge of Ha Gorge. Monasteraki Halasmenos is nearby. Halasmenos, a Late Minoan IIIC site, lies on a hill near the end of the gorge's mouth, and with Kavousi and Vasiliki-Kephala, it forms a triad of important sites from this period. A number of ruins and artifacts have been unearthed on the northern bank of the Ha gorge, with some of the ruins perched on the individual narrow rock shelves near vertical face of the cliff. Apart from archaeologists, a few adventure seeking rock climbers are seen in the area, which otherwise is almost inaccessible.

== Wildlife ==
Smyrnium, a genus of flowering plants in the family Apiaceae, the umbellifers found in Crete is also found in the inaccessible Ha gorge; there are three species of this plant. The gorge is home to many migratory and endemic birds, mammals, reptiles and insects.

== Bibliography ==
- Baram, Uzi; Carroll, Lynda (11 April 2006). A Historical Archaeology of the Ottoman Empire: Breaking New Ground. Springer Science & Business Media. ISBN 978-0-306-47182-7.
- Fassoulas, Charalampos G. (2000). Field guide to the geology of Crete. Natural History Museum of Crete. ISBN 978-960-367-008-7.
- Fielding, John; Turland, Nick J.; Turland, Nicholas (2005). Flowers of Crete. Royal Botanic Gardens, Kew. ISBN 978-1-84246-079-5.
- Godfrey, Jonnie; Karslake, Elizabeth (2003). Eastern Crete. Sunflower Books (UK). ISBN 978-1-85691-197-9.
- Greece. Hypourgeio Politismou; Center, Onassis Cultural (2008). From the land of the labyrinth: Minoan Crete, 3000-1100 B.C. : essays. Published by the Alexander S. Onassis Public Benefit Foundation (USA). ISBN 978-0-9776598-2-1.
- Grove, Alfred Thomas; Rackham, Oliver (2003). The Nature of Mediterranean Europe: An Ecological History. Yale University Press. ISBN 978-0-300-10055-6.
- The Institute (2001). Bulletin of the Institute of Classical Studies of the University of London. The Institute.
- McEnroe, John C. (1 May 2010). Architecture of Minoan Crete: Constructing Identity in the Aegean Bronze Age. University of Texas Press. ISBN 978-0-292-77839-9.
- Rackham, Oliver; Moody, Jennifer (January 1996). The Making of the Cretan Landscape. Manchester University Press. ISBN 978-0-7190-3647-7.
- Schulte-Peevers, Andrea; Deliso, Chris; Hannigan, Des (1 May 2012). Lonely Planet Crete. Lonely Planet. ISBN 978-1-74321-027-7.
- Tsipopoulou, Metaxia (2001). "A New Late Minoan IIIC Shrine at Halamenos, East Crete" (PDF). In Laffineur, Robert; Hägg, Robin (eds.). Potnia: deities and religion in the Aegean Bronze Age. 8th International Aegean Conference/8e Rencontre égéenne internationale, Göteborg, Göteborg University, 12-15 April 2000. Université de Liège, Histoire de l'art et archéologie de la Grèce antique. pp. 99–100. Archived from the original on 31 December 2004.
