= Irish Institute of Hellenic Studies at Athens =

Archaeological institute operating in Athens, Greece

Coordinates: 37°59′26″N 23°44′06″E

The IIHSA logo combines images from Classical Greece and prehistoric Ireland

The Irish Institute of Hellenic Studies at Athens (IIHSA) (Irish: Institiúid Éireannach san Ataen don Léann Heilléanach; Greek: Ιρλανδικό Ινστιτούτο Ελληνικών Σπουδών στην Αθήνα) is one of the 19 foreign archaeological institutes operating in Athens, Greece.

== General information and mission ==
The IIHSA was officially founded in 1995 and has been fully operational since 2002. It aims to promote, coordinate, and assist Irish or Irish-based researchers who are active in Greece, to develop Irish-based archaeological projects in Greece, to raise the awareness and profile of Hellenic Studies in Ireland and to promote Irish culture in Greece.

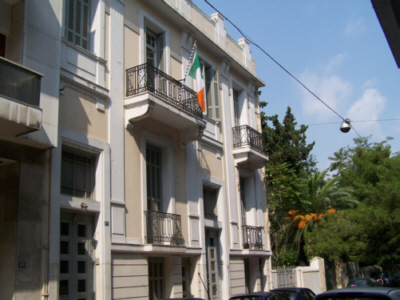
The IIHSA premises, in an Art Déco building in Exarcheia.

== Activities ==
Apart from its archaeological fieldwork (below), the IIHSA runs a lecture series, hosts occasional seminars and exhibitions, organises annual archaeological study tours for Irish students and operates a programme of bursaries enabling Irish students to undertake research in Greece. It also provides accommodation for Irish and international scholars active in Athens. Since 2007, the IIHSA organises annual conferences on changing (normally archaeological) topics. It has also been involved in Irish-themed cultural events outside Athens.

== Archaeological projects ==
Since 2003, the IIHSA has been conducting an archeological survey at Leivathos (Kefalonia); in 2007, it began an excavation at Priniatikos Pyrgos (East Crete).

== Bibliography ==
- E. Korka et al. (eds.): Foreign Archaeological Schools in Greece, 160 Years, Athens, Hellenic Ministry of Culture, 2006, p. 102-107.
