= Fantázia =

Slovak science fiction, fantasy, and horror magazine

- Cover of the first issue of Fantázia published July 1997
- Editor: Juraj Malíček
- Categories: Science fiction, Fantasy, Horror
- Frequency: Quarterly, originally Bimonthly
- First issue: July 1997
- Final issue: 2011
- Company: Ivan Aľakša -- Fantázia
- Country: Slovakia
- Language: Slovak
- Website: www.fantazia.sk/casopis
- ISSN: 1335-2601

Fantázia was a Slovak science fiction, fantasy and horror magazine. It was first published in July 1997. The magazine was started in Šaľa, Slovakia by Ivan Aľakša, who served as its editor until 2006, when he withdrew to concentrate on publishing duties and was replaced by Juraj Malíček.

Fantázia went on a hiatus in 2007 before being relaunched in 2008, with broader focus on various elements of popular culture in an attempt to win over a larger audience. The magazine ultimately folded in 2011, transforming into an online, primarily Facebook-centered community.

== Periodicity ==
Fantázia's original publishing frequency was bimonthly, this was however dropped in favour of quarterly periodicity by the year 2000. Since then, the magazine kept oscillating between the two, occasionally even dropping to three issues per year, as shown in the publishing history section below.

In 2007, it was announced that the magazine would be discontinued, as it had not, unlike in previous years, been awarded a government grant by the Ministry of Culture of the Slovak Republic. Only two issues, the lowest number since 1997, were published that year.

Fantázia was relaunched on July 15, 2008, with a new look, new logotype and broadened focus on various aspects of popular culture. The magazine once again folded in 2011, transforming into an online, Facebook-centered community.

== Publishing history ==
- two issues in 1997 (#0 to #1)
- six issues in 1998 (#2 to #7)
- five issues in 1999 (#8 to #12)
- four issues in 2000 (#13 to #16)
- four issues in 2001 (#17 to #20)
- three issues in 2002 (#21 to #23)
- five issues in 2003 (#24 to #28)
- four issues in 2004 (#29 to #32)
- three issues in 2005 (#33 to #35)
- three issues in 2006 (#36 to #38)
- two issues in 2007 (#39 to #40)
- four issues in 2008 (#41 to #44)
- four issues in 2009 (#45 to #48)
- five issues in 2010 (#49 to #53)
- one issue in 2011 (#54)

== Significance ==
Being the only Slovak magazine specializing in science fiction, fantasy and horror, Fantázia helped to introduce several new writers to Slovak (and, to certain extent, Czech) audiences in the late 1990s and the 2000s.

After the annual Krutohlav anthology which collected best short stories written by contenders for the Gustáv Reuss Award ceased its publication in 2004, Fantázia remained one of the few viable opportunities for aspiring writers to get their works published in Slovakia.

Among the authors popularized by the magazine are Juraj Červenák, Dušan Fabian (whose debut novel, Invocatio Elementalium, was serialized in the magazine in 2006–2007), Michal Jedinák, Zuska Minichová and Anton Stiffel, while former Gustáv Reuss Award winners Jozef Girovský, Štefan Huslica and Alexandra Pavelková have each had several stories published.

== Fantázia Award ==
Since 2003 Fantázia has held its own annual literary contest, originally called Raketa (Rocket), and later renamed to Cena Fantázie (Fantázia Award). The award gained importance especially after the discontinuation of the similarly conceived Gustáv Reuss Award and continues to exist even after the original magazine folded.

The contest is free to enter for authors of original, previously unpublished short stories written in Slovak and of up to 54,000 characters. A committee of five judges selects five of the submitted stories to be shortlisted for the award and published in the Fantázia magazine. The winner is subsequently determined by readers' vote.

=== A list of Fantázia Award winners ===
- Juraj Červenák in 2003
- Alexandra Pavelková in 2004
- Scarlett Rauschgoldová in 2005
- Monika Michalovová in 2006
- Lucia Droppová in 2007
- Lívia Hlavačková in 2008
- Lucia Droppová in 2009
- Tomáš Straňák in 2010
- Ivan Čipkár in 2011

== See also ==
- Science fiction magazine
- Fantasy fiction magazine
- Horror fiction magazine
