= Vasiliki ware =

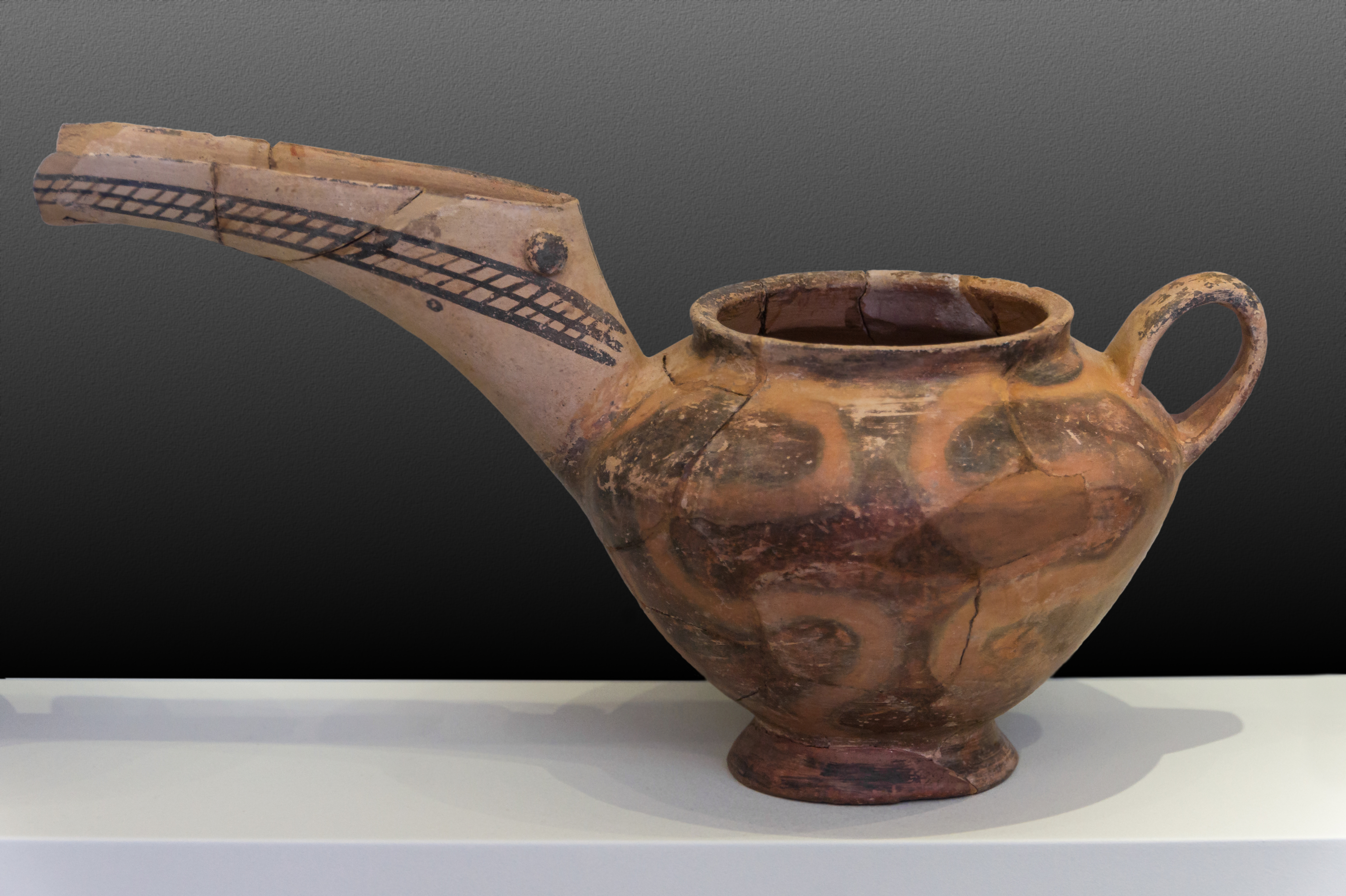
Long-neck Vasiliki ware "teapot", with characteristic mottled decoration.

Vasiliki wares are a distinctive type of Minoan pottery produced in Crete during the Minoan period, named for the finds around the town of Vasiliki, Lasithi, although it was produced at other sites too. The vases include a reddish-brown wash applied unevenly to mimic stone vessels. The mottling was produced by uneven firing of the slip-covered pot, with the hottest areas turning dark. Considering that the mottling was controlled into a pattern, touching with hot coals was probably used to produce it. There is also a style painted in a creamy white over the reddish-brown wash applied all over the body.

The first examples of Vasiliki ware are to be found in East Crete during EM IIA period, but it is in the next period, EM IIB, that it becomes the dominant form among the fine wares throughout eastern and southern Crete. Dating varies between scholars, but the Early Minoan II period is generally thought to run between around 2600–2000 BC.

The typical long-spouted pots, with a relatively small top mouth, are often called "teapots" by archaeologists; another common shape is called the "egg-cup".

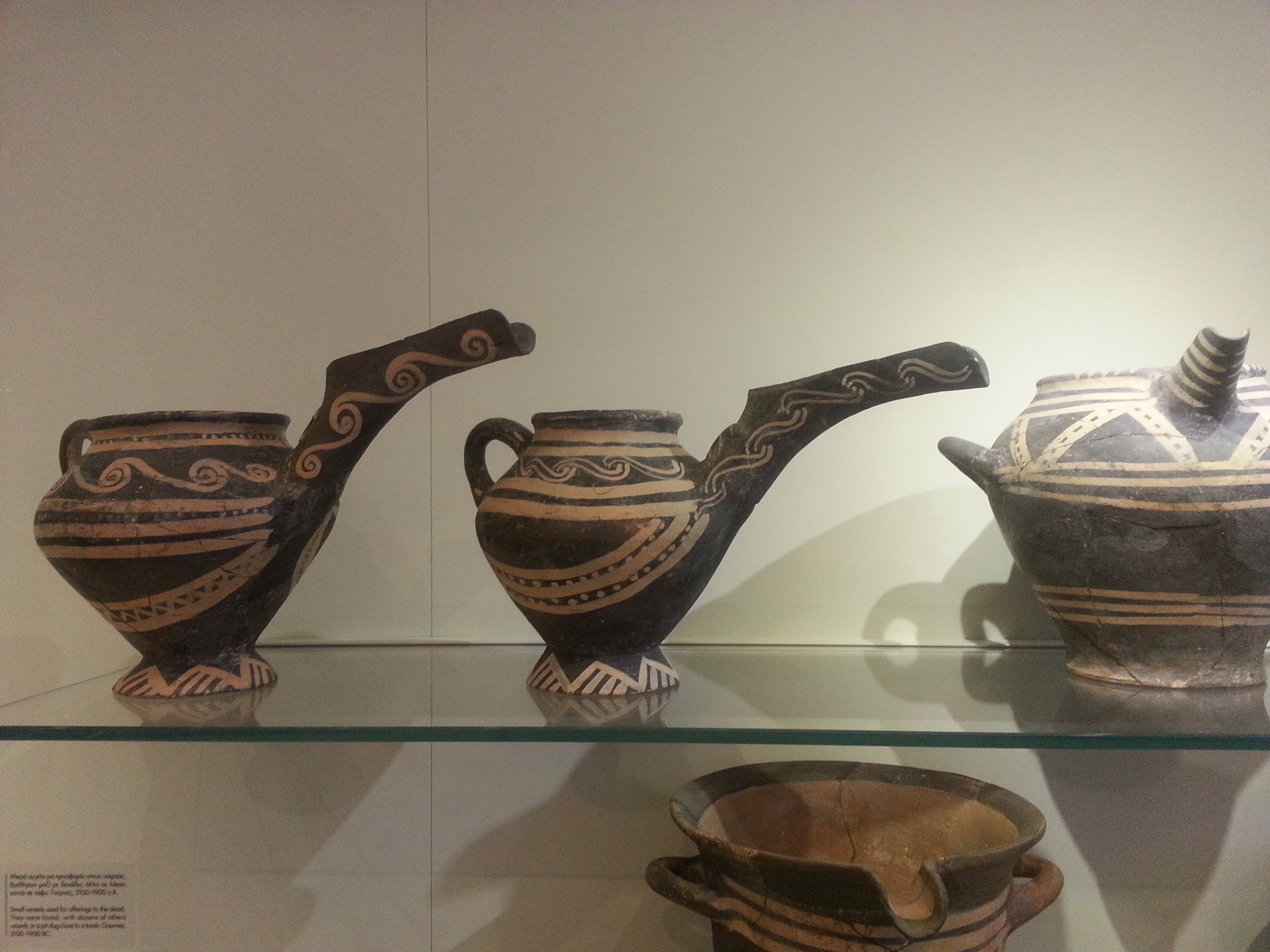
White style Vasiliki ware, AMH

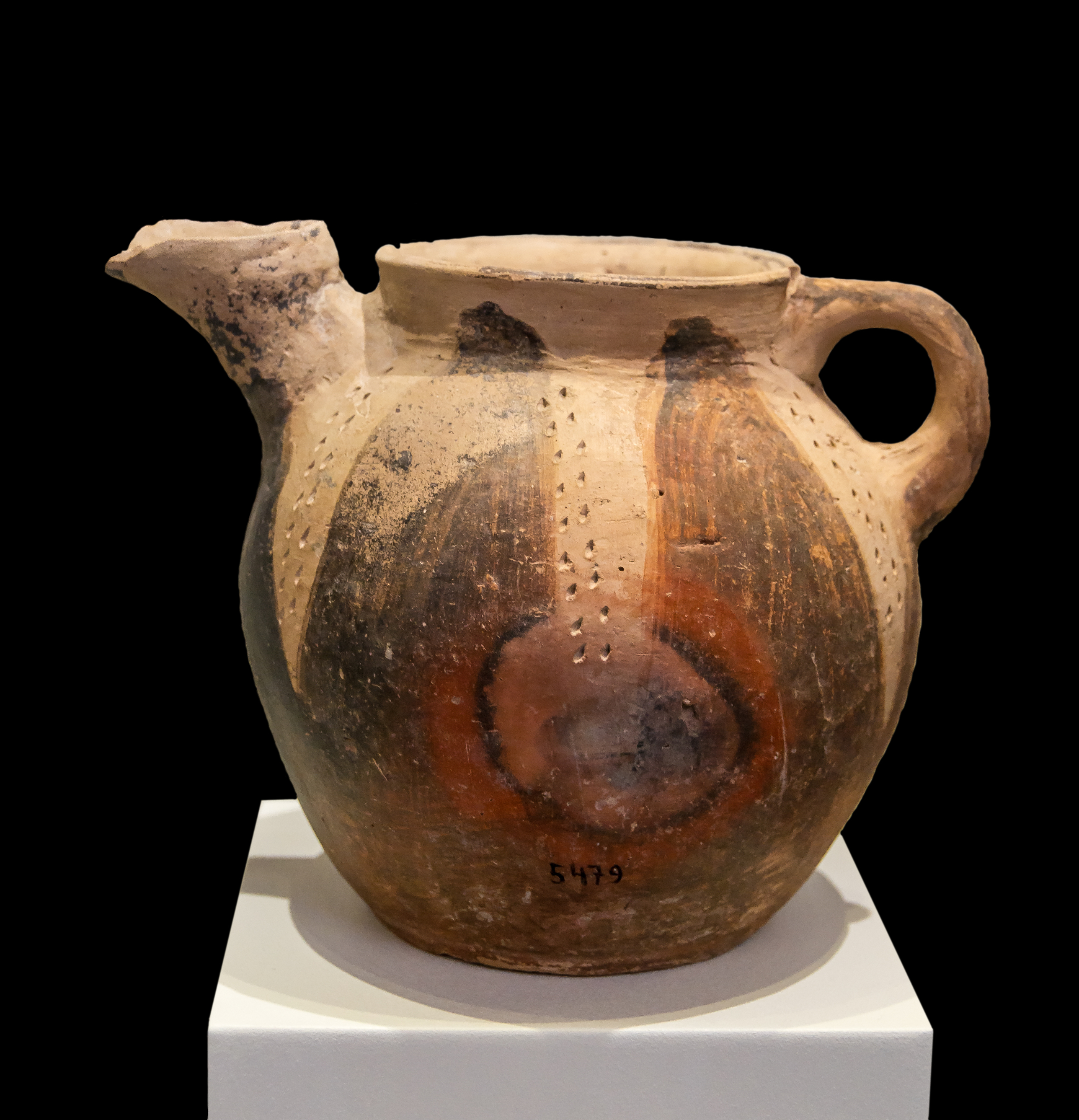
Another style of "teapot", Vasiliki, 2400–2200 BC, AMH

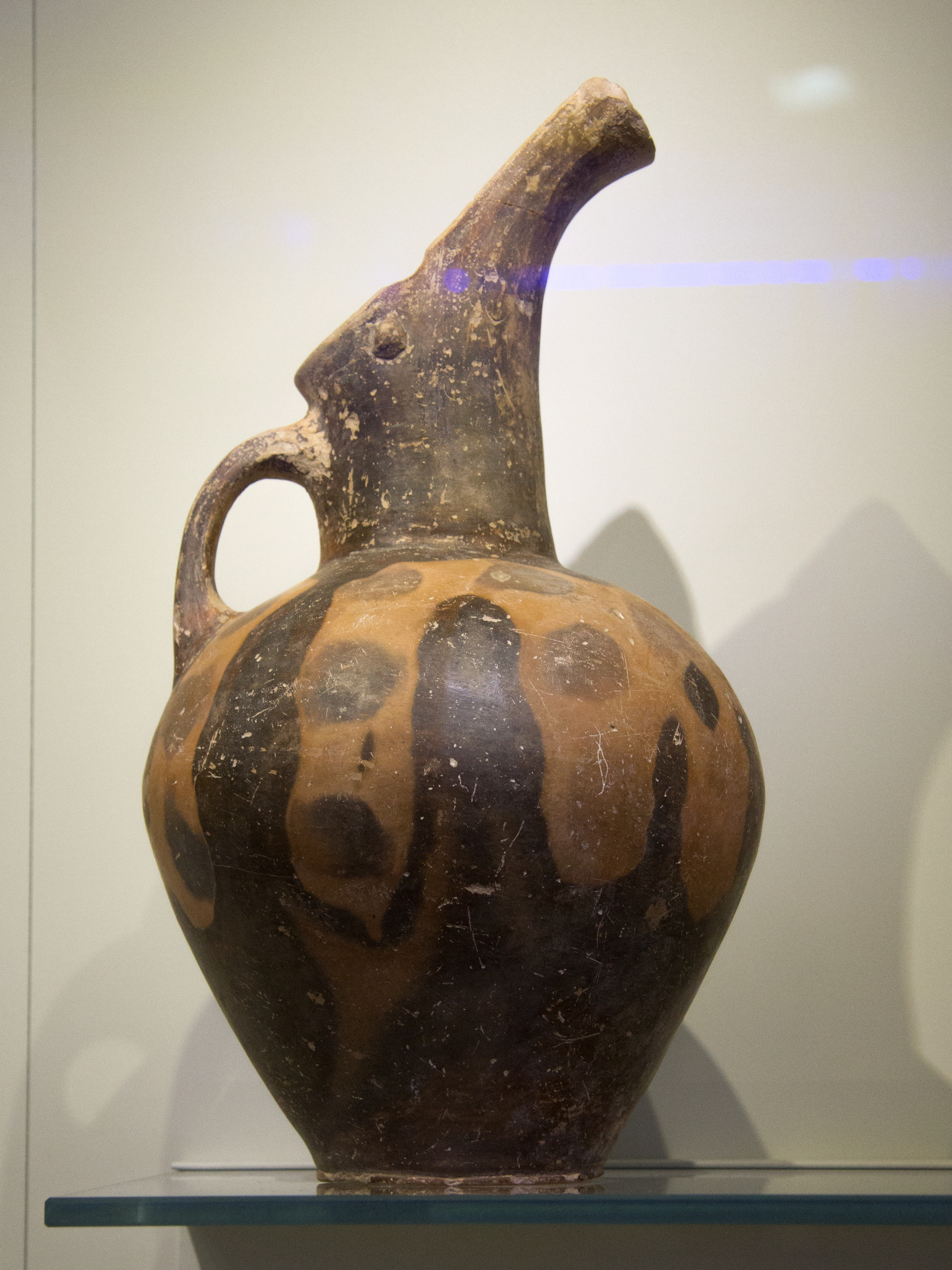
Vasiliki ware, jug, 2400–2200 BC

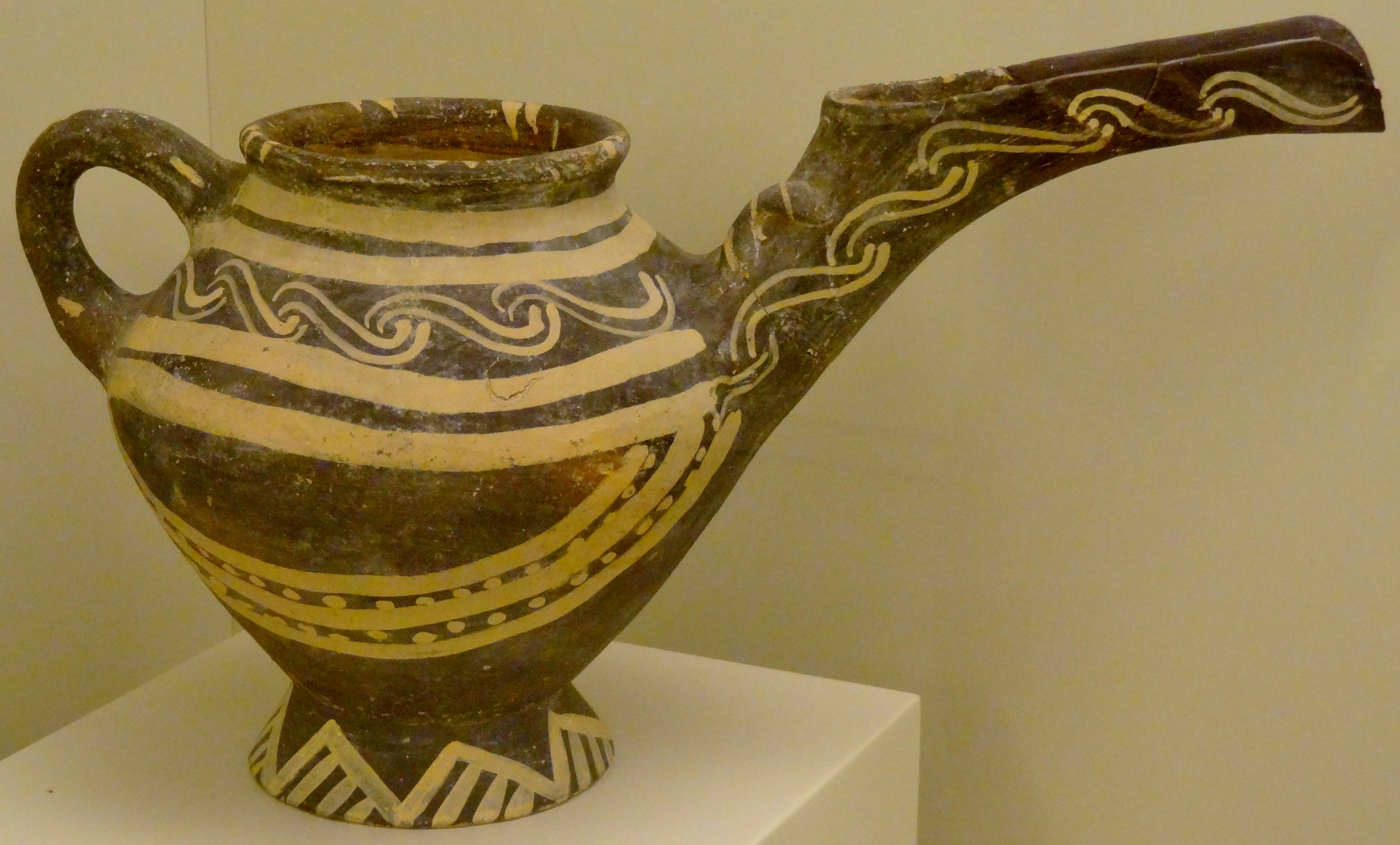
Teapot in the white style, 2300–2000 BC, AMH

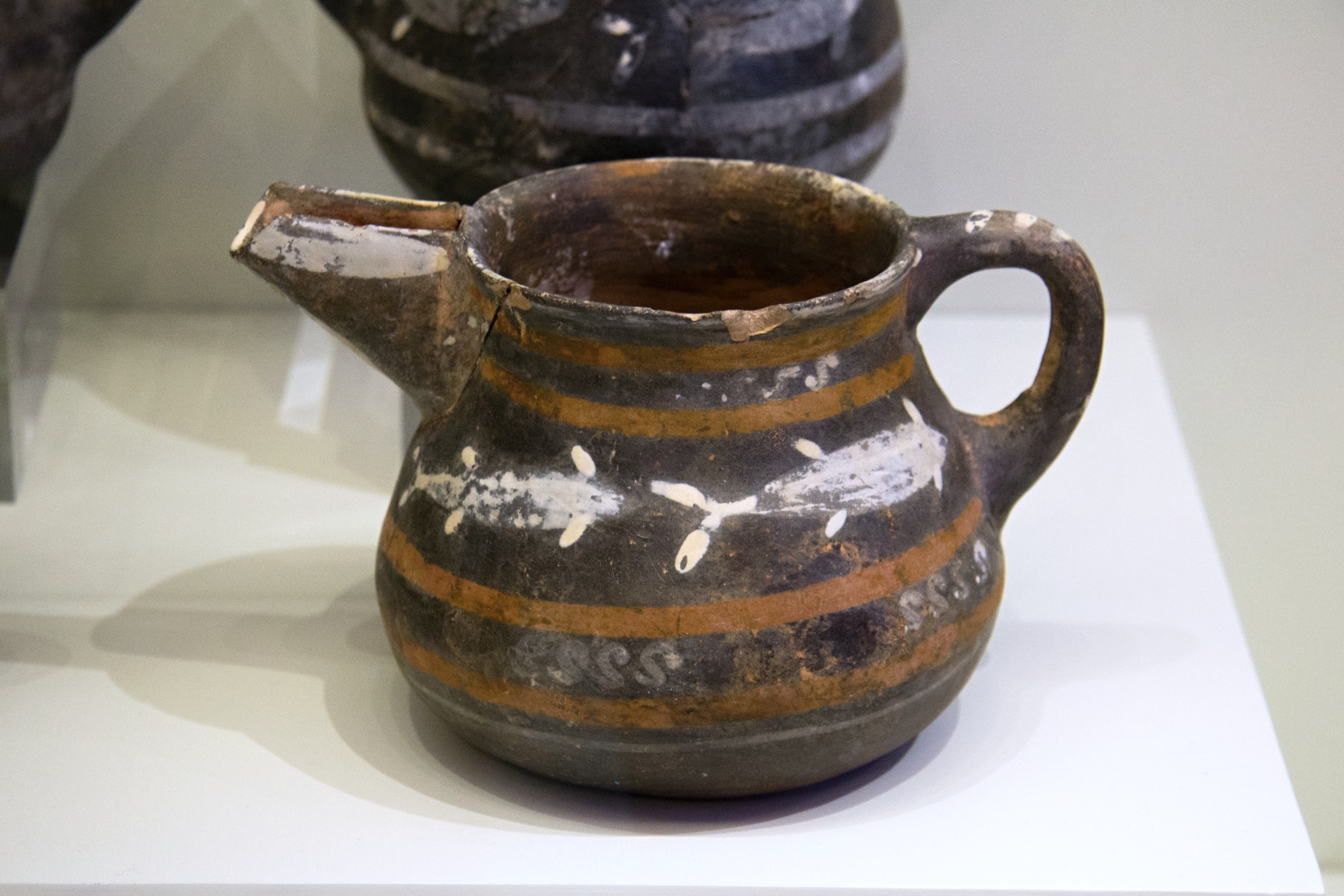
White style jug, 2300–1900 BC

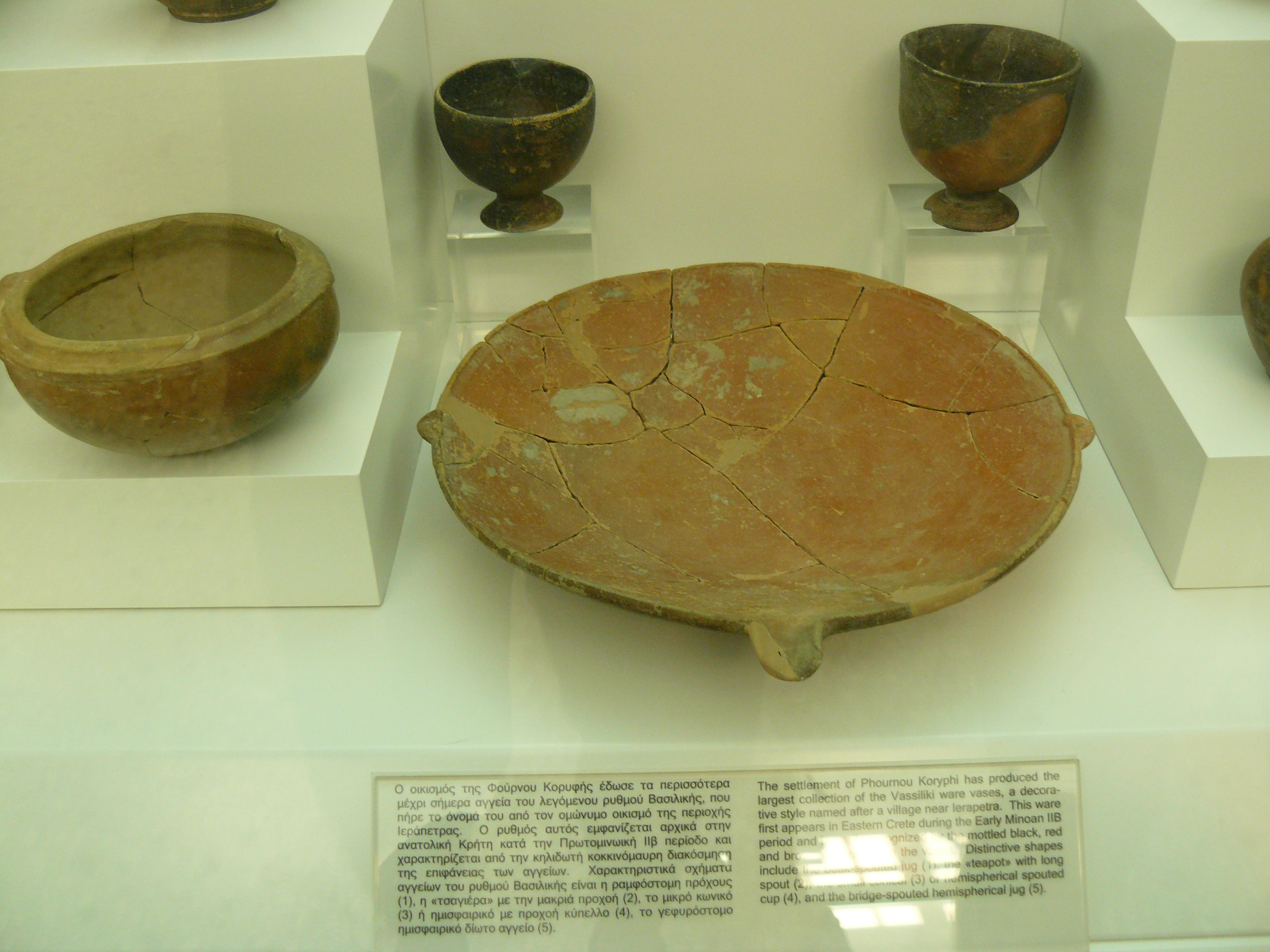
Other shapes; two "egg-cups" at rear
