= Istron =

Coordinates: 35°07′40″N 25°43′52″E

Istron (Ancient Greek: Ἴστρων) was a town of ancient Crete. Istron is mentioned in a list of Cretan cities cited in a decree of Knossos from about 259-233 BCE, as well as in the list of Cretan cities that signed an alliance with Eumenes II of Pergamon in the year 183 BCE.

The site of Istron is located near modern Priniatikos Pyrgos.
