= Vasiliki, Lasithi =

Coordinates: 35°04′55″N 25°48′40″E

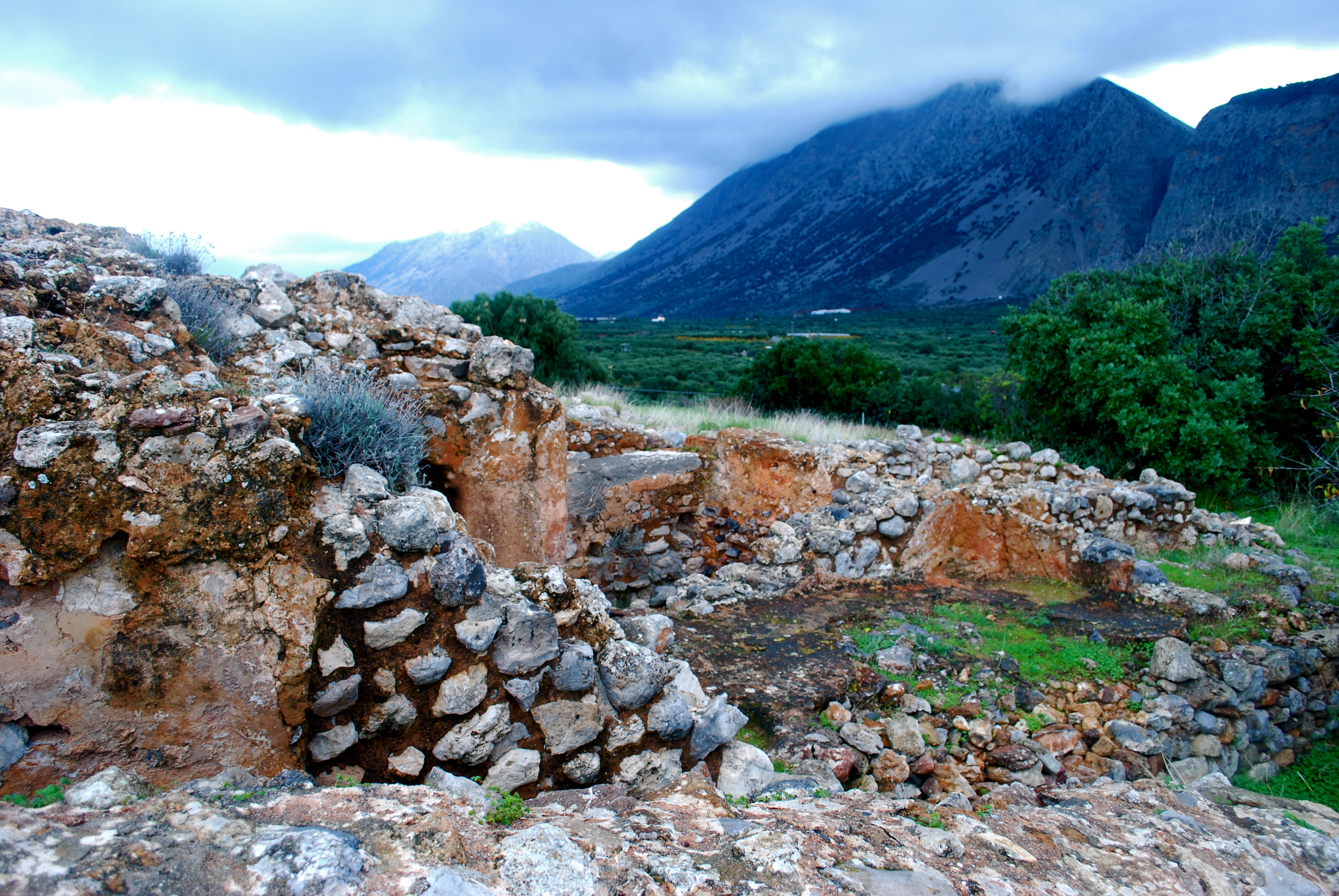
Archaeological site of Vasiliki, Crete

Vasiliki is the name of a village in the municipality of Ierapetra, in the prefecture of Lasithi, on Crete, and the name of the nearby Minoan archeological site. The site took its name from the village.

== Geography ==
Vasiliki lies on a small hill in the north of the Ierapetra isthmus. It is located about 2 km inland from the north coast of Crete and the Mirabello Bay. The nearby archaeological site of Priniatikos Pyrgos is about 7 km to the north-west.

The exit of the impressive Ha Gorge is located nearby.

== Archaeology ==
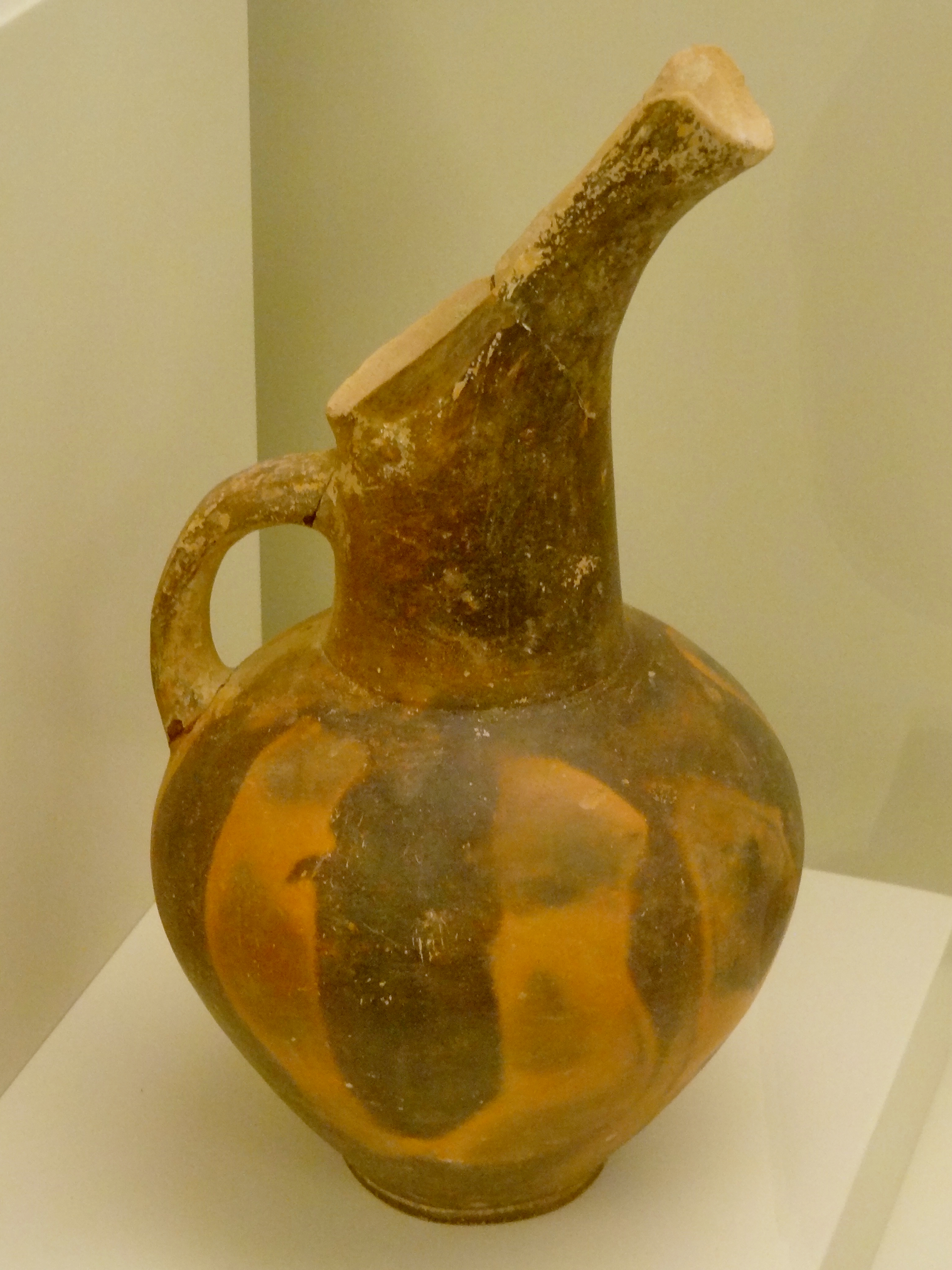
Vasiliki style vessel, Pre-palatial, 2500 BC. Heraklion Archaeological Museum

Vasiliki was first excavated 1903-1906 by American archaeologist R. B. Seager. Nicolas Platon continued excavations in 1953. In 1970, A. A. Zois began meticulous work that lasted until 1982, and returned to the site again in 1990 to continue the work.

The Minoan village was in use from EMIIA to LMIA. The first structures were constructed during EM IIA period. These buildings were destroyed and new buildings went up during EM IIB.

From about 2500 BC onwards, the culture of Vasiliki resembled art elements as other Cretan sites such as Knossos and Trapeza based upon pottery finds. A nearby tomb from LMIII was once discovered, but the location has not been rediscovered.

== Vasiliki ware ==
The site includes houses, many Vasiliki-ware pottery finds and a paved courtyard.

The distinctive pottery found at this site and named Vasiliki Ware is not unique to Vasiliki. It was also produced at several other sites and widely distributed elsewhere.

The first examples of Vasiliki Ware are to be found in East Crete during EM IIA period, but it is in the next period, EM IIB, that it becomes the dominant form among the fine wares throughout eastern and southern Crete.

There's another important archaeological site nearby, Priniatikos Pyrgos, roughly contemporary with Vasiliki. It contains many examples of Vasiliki ware.
